= Spanish Colonial Revival architecture =

Architectural style

Spanish Revival architecture
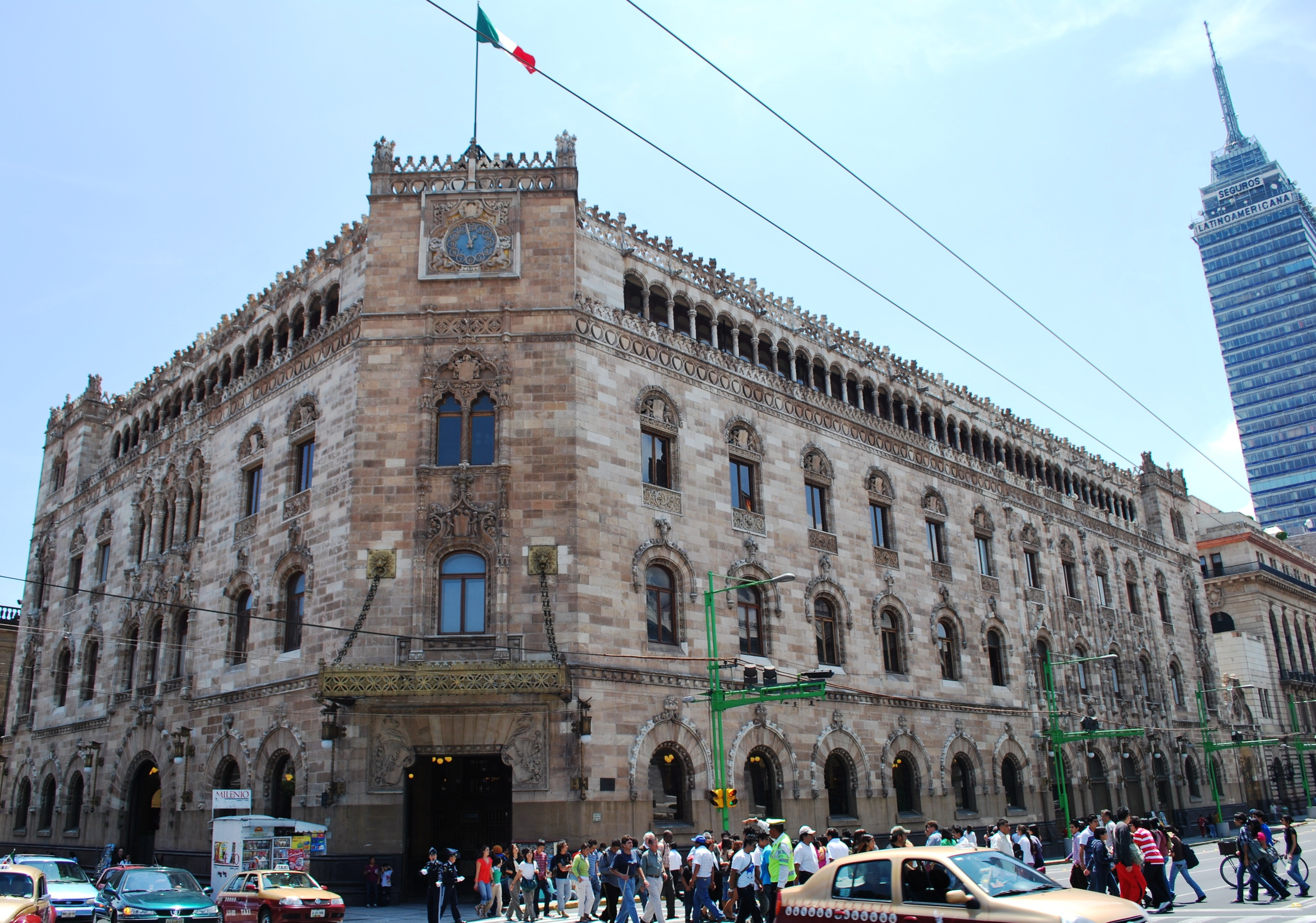
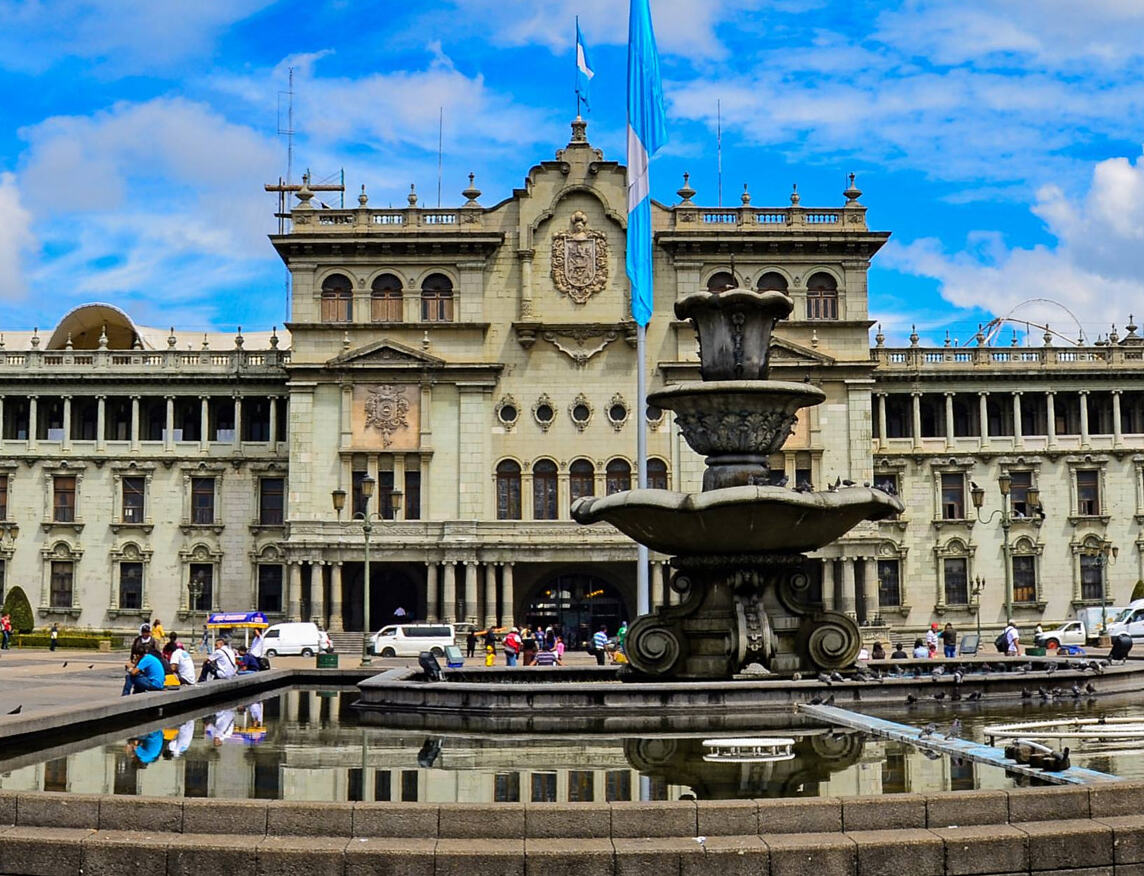
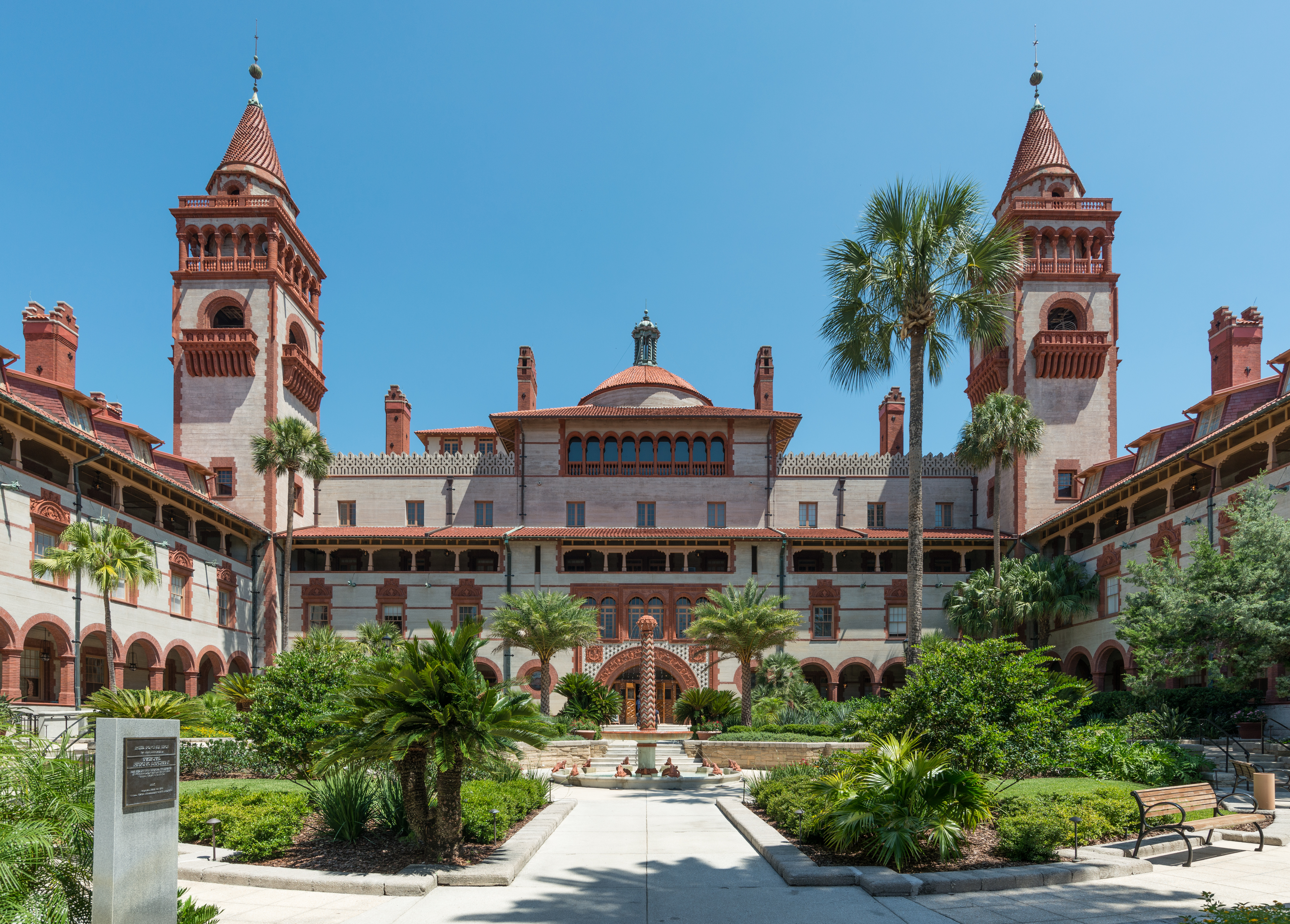
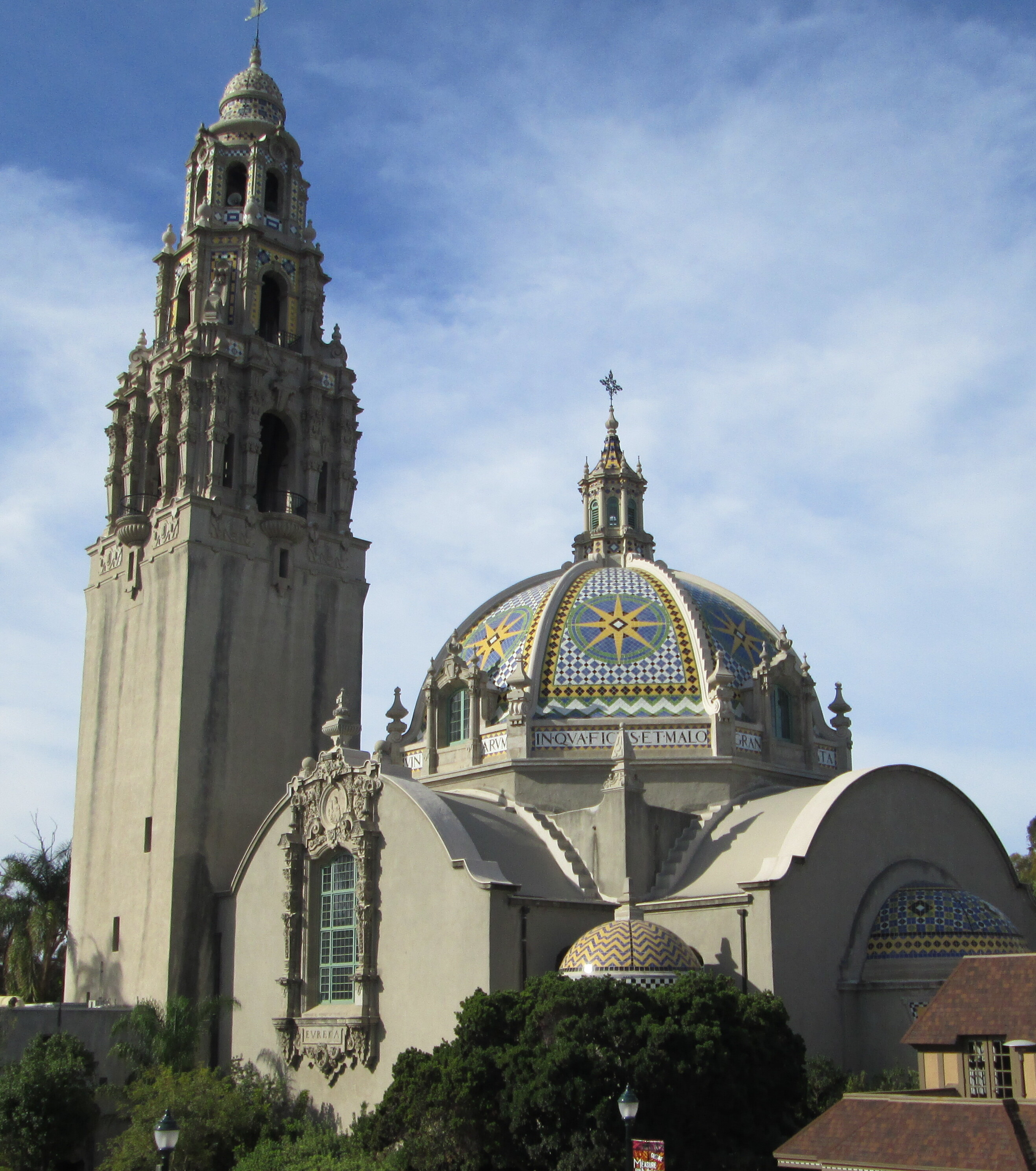
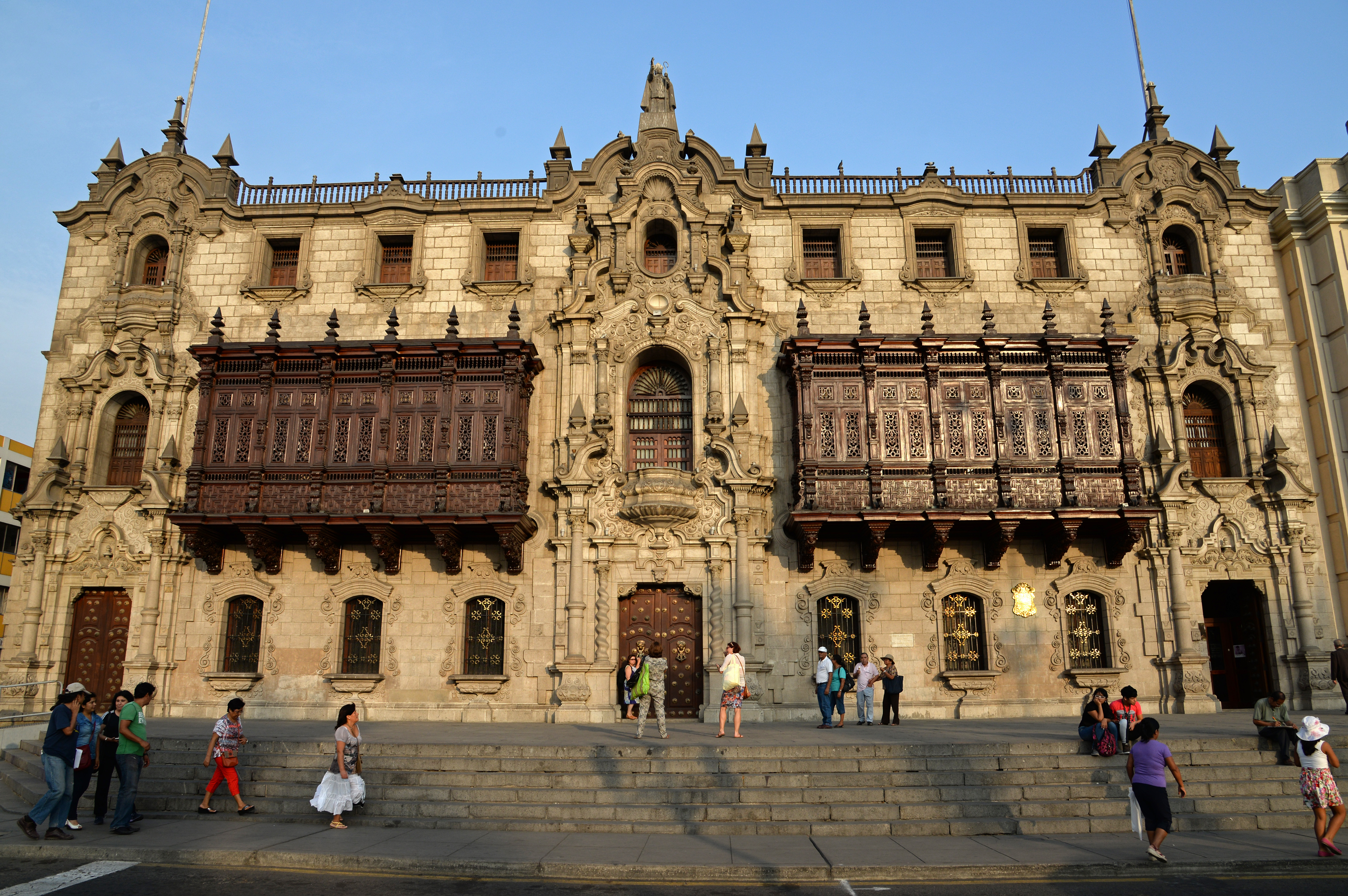
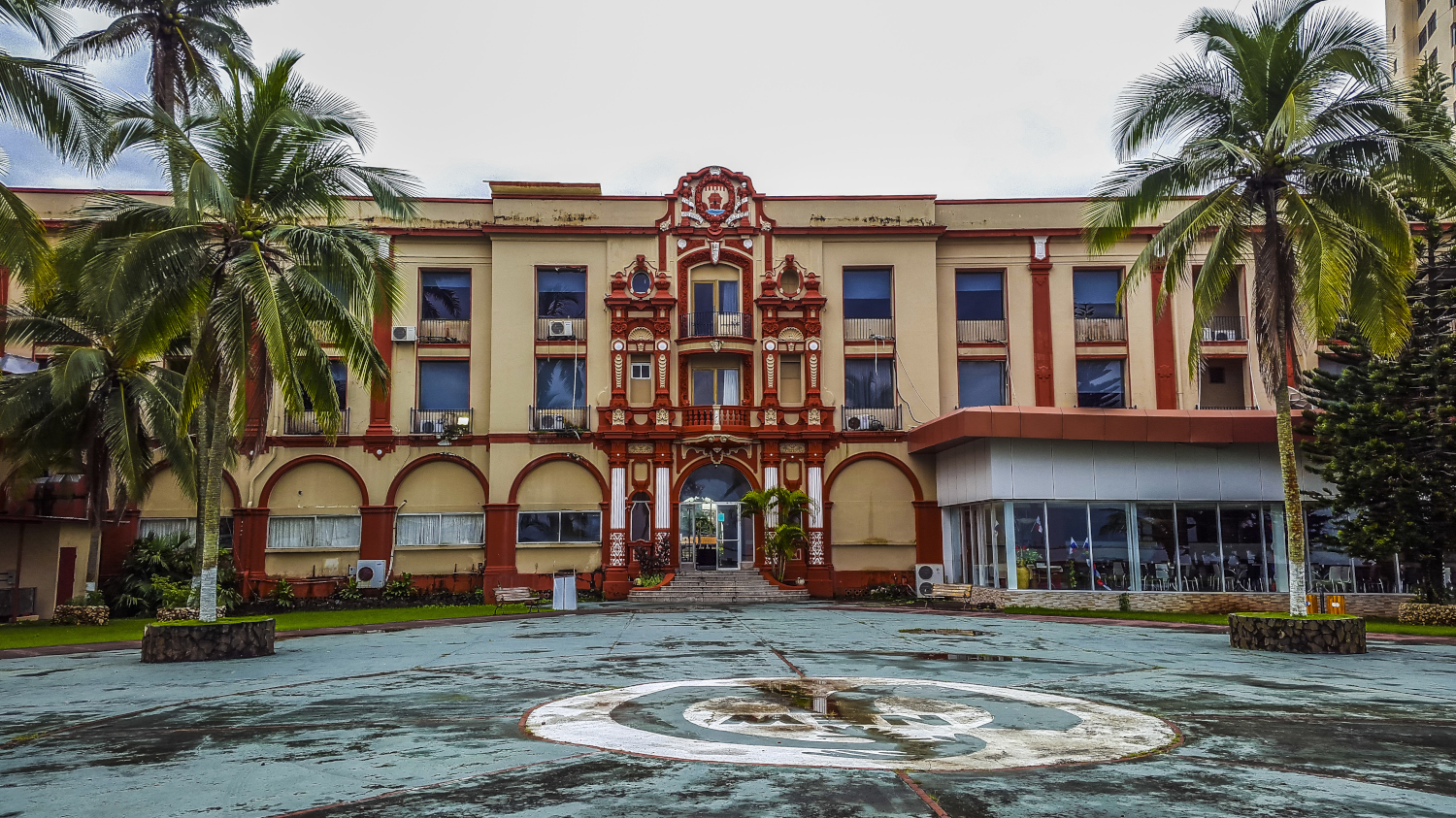
- Palacio de Correos; Mexico City, Mexico (1907) National Palace, Guatemala City, Guatemala (1943) Ponce de Leon Hotel; St. Augustine, Florida (1887) California Tower; San Diego, California (1915) Archbishop's Palace; Lima, Peru (1924) Hotel Washington; Cristóbal, Colón, Panama (1924)
- Years active: Late 19th century–Present
- Location: Primarily Hispanic America, the United States, the Philippines
- Influences: Spanish architecture (Spanish Gothic, Plateresque, Spanish Renaissance, Spanish Baroque, Neo-Mudéjar), Spanish colonial architecture (Churrigueresque, Earthquake Baroque, Monterey Colonial), Mexican architecture (Mexican Baroque), Peruvian architecture (Andean Baroque)
- Influenced: Mediterranean Revival architecture, Territorial Revival architecture, Colonial Californiano, Monterey Revival architecture, Mission Revival architecture, California Churrigueresque, Pueblo Revival architecture,

Spanish Colonial Revival architecture (Spanish: Arquitectura neocolonial española), also known simply as Spanish Revival, or labelled as Mediterranean Revival, is a term used to encompass a number of revivalist architectural styles based in both Spanish colonial architecture and Spanish architecture in general. These styles flourished throughout the Americas, especially in former Spanish colonies, from California to Argentina.

In the United States, the earliest use of this style was in Florida, Texas, and California, where it is sometimes known as the Early California Style.. St. Augustine, Florida was founded on September 8, 1565, by Spanish admiral Pedro Menéndez de Avilés, Florida's first governor. The city had served as the capital of Florida for over 250 years when Spain ceded Florida to the United States in 1819. By the late 1880s, St. Augustine was being developed by Henry M. Flagler as a winter resort for wealthy northern families. He built two grand hotels in the Spanish Revival/Mediterranean Revival styles: the Ponce de Leon Hotel (Carrère and Hastings, 1882) and the Alcazar Hotel (Carrère and Hastings, 1887). These influenced the development of the Spanish Colonial Revival style. A few years later, at the Panama–California Exposition of 1915 in San Diego, highlighting the work of architect Bertram Goodhue, Spanish Colonial Revival was given further national exposure. Embraced principally in Florida, Texas, and California, the Spanish Colonial Revival movement enjoyed its greatest popularity between 1915 and 1931.

In Mexico, the Spanish Colonial Revival in architecture was tied to the nationalist movement in the arts encouraged by the post–Mexican Revolution government. The Mexican style was primarily influenced by the Baroque architecture of central New Spain, in contrast to the U.S. style which was primarily influenced by the northern missions of New Spain. Subsequently, the U.S. interpretation saw popularity in Mexico and was locally termed colonial californiano.

Modern-day tract home design in Southern California and Florida largely descends from the early movement. The iconic terracotta shingles and stucco walls have been standard design of new construction in these regions from the 1970s to present.

== Development of style ==
=== Mediterranean Revival ===
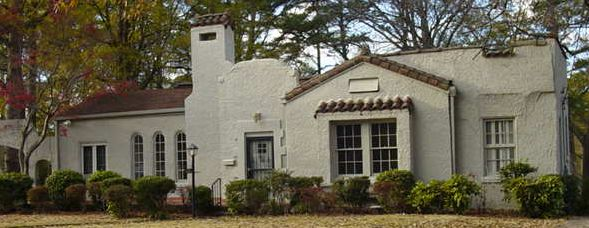
Spanish Colonial Revival style in contemporary residence

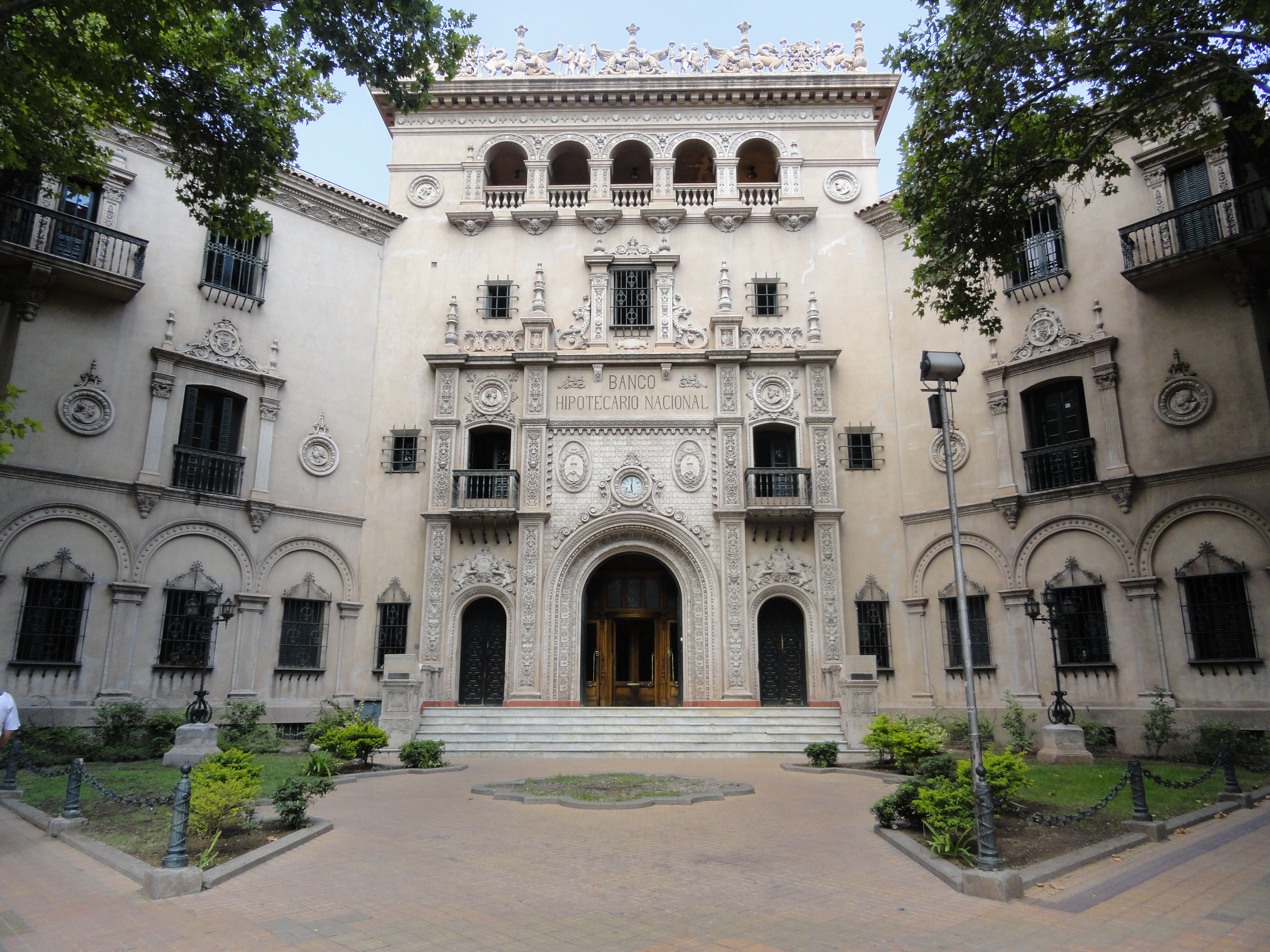
Secretary of Culture of Mendoza, Argentina (1929)

The antecedents of the Spanish Colonial Revival Style in the United States can be traced to the Mediterranean Revival architectural style. In St. Augustine, Florida, a former Spanish colony, a winter playground was developing for wealthy people from northern cities in the United States. Three architects from New York City John Carrère and Thomas Hastings of Carrère and Hastings and Bostonian Franklin W. Smith, designed grand, elaborately detailed hotels in the Mediterranean Revival and Spanish Revival styles in the 1880s. With the construction of the Ponce de Leon Hotel (designed by Carrère and Hastings, 1882), the Alcazar Hotel (Carrère and Hastings, 1887), and the Casa Monica Hotel (later the Hotel Cordova) built by Franklin W. Smith in 1888, Spanish-influenced architecture spread to several other parts of Florida. These three hotels were influenced not only by the centuries-old buildings remaining from the period Spanish rule in St. Augustine but also by The Old City House, constructed in 1873 and still standing, an excellent example of early Spanish Colonial Revival architecture.

=== Mission Revival ===
The possibilities of the Spanish Colonial Revival Style were brought to the attention of architects attending late 19th and early 20th centuries international expositions. For example, California's Mission Revival style Pavilion in white stucco at the World's Columbian Exposition of 1893 in Chicago, and the Mission Inn, along with the Electric Tower of the Pan-American Exposition in Buffalo in 1900 introduced the potential of Spanish Colonial Revival. They also integrated porticoes, pediments and colonnades influenced by Beaux Arts classicism as well.

=== Florida ===
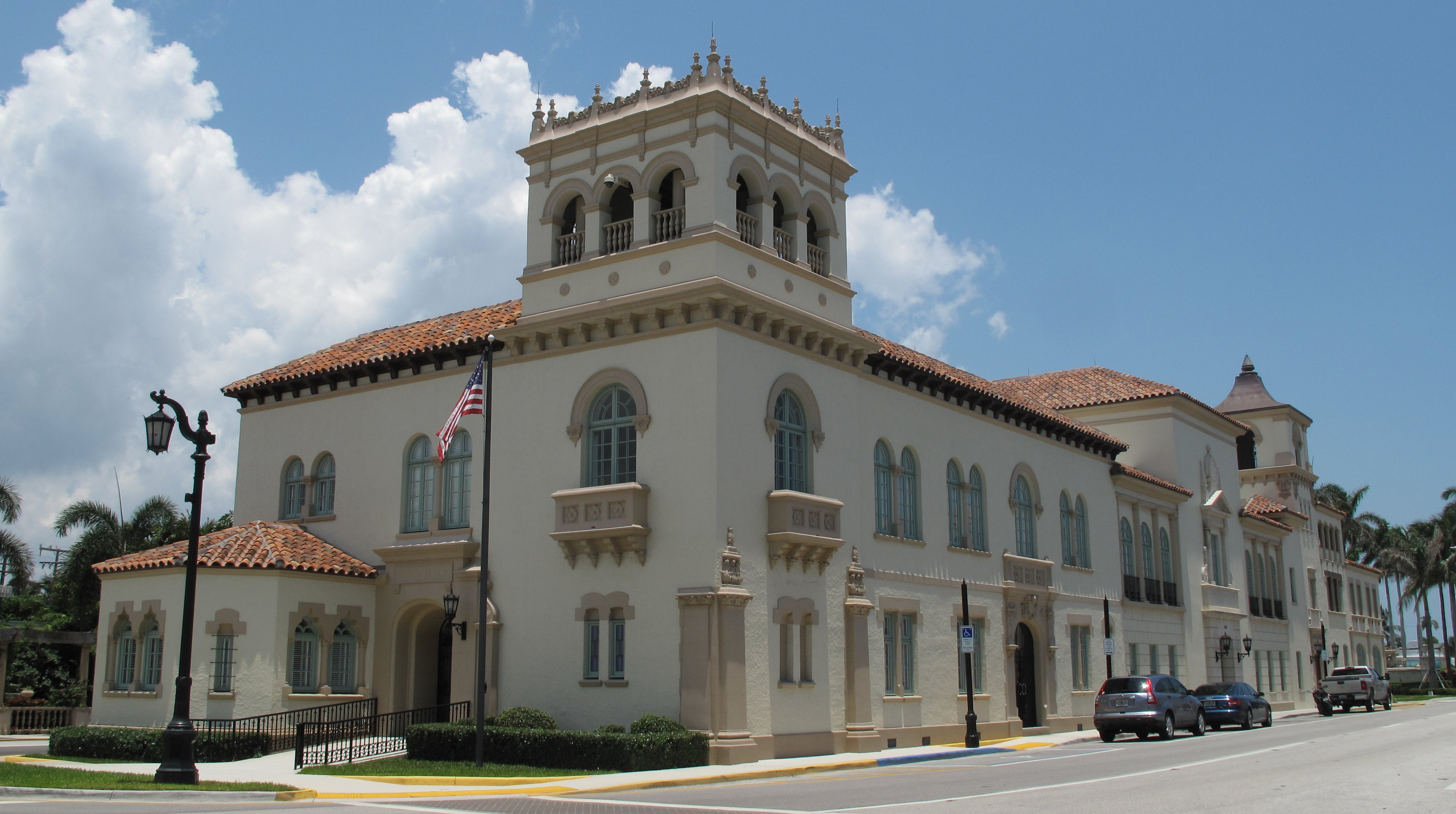
Palm Beach Town Hall in Palm Beach, Florida (1925)

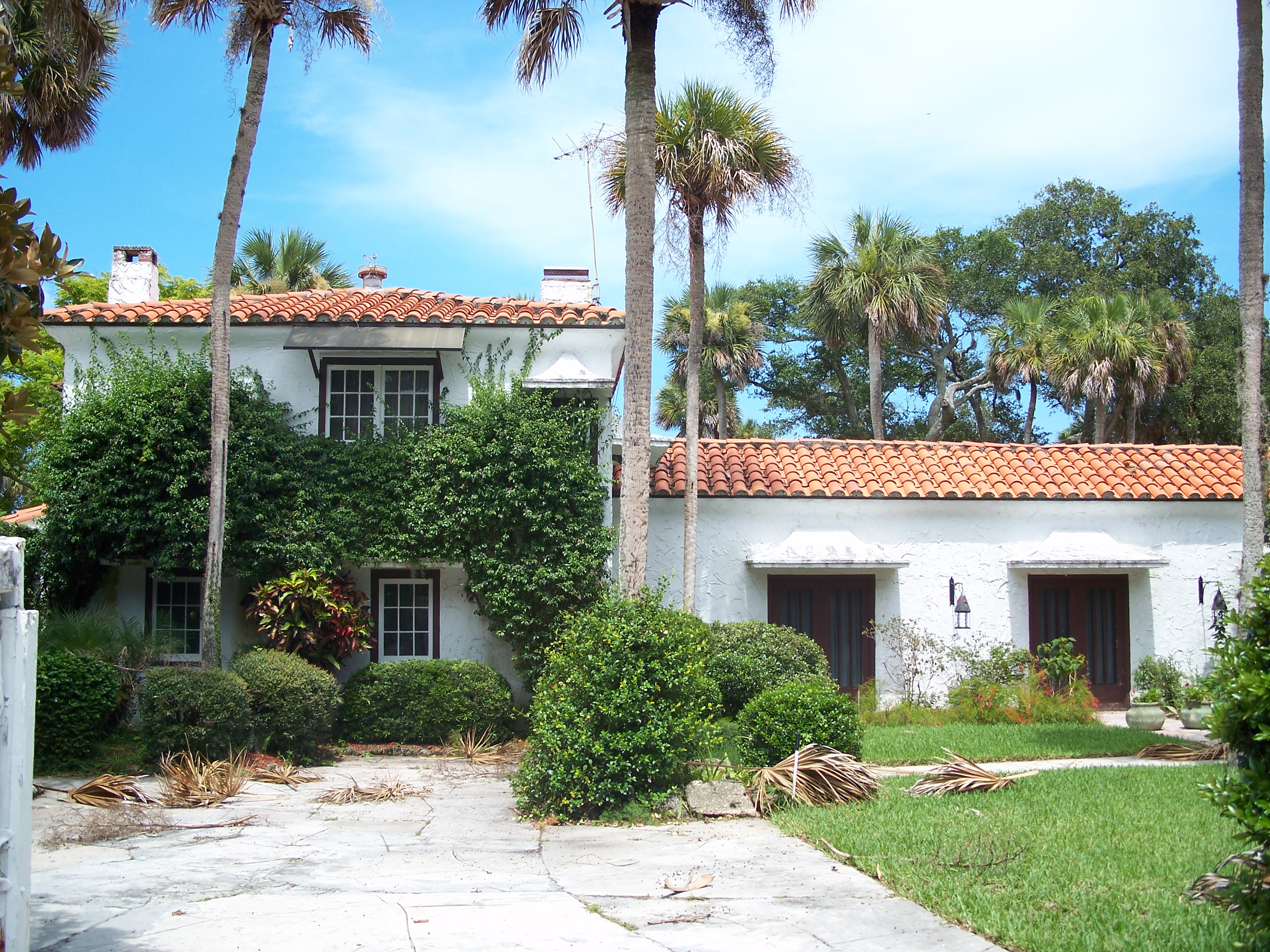
El Real Retiro in New Smyrna Beach, Florida (1923)

By the early years of the 1910s, Florida was major center for Spanish Colonial Revival style in the United States. Frederick H. Trimble's Farmer's Bank in Vero Beach, completed in 1914, is a fully mature early example of the style. The city of St. Cloud, Florida, espoused the style both for homes and commercial structures and has a fine collection of subtle stucco buildings reminiscent of colonial Mexico. Many of these were designed by architectural partners Ida Annah Ryan and Isabel Roberts.

One of the most significant examples of the emerging popularity of Spanish Colonial Revival in the United States at the time was the architecture of Coral Gables, Florida. A planned city established in the 1920s, the city's architecture is almost entirely Mediterranean Revival style, mandated in the original plan. The city was developed by George E. Merrick, a real estate developer from Pennsylvania, during the Florida land boom of the 1920s. The Coral Gables Congregational Church, donated by Merrick, and the Catholic Church of the Little Flower, were classic examples of the Spanish Renaissance style. Early in the city's planning and development, Merrick shared his vision for Coral Gables as "a most extraordinary opportunity for the building of 'Castles in Spain'. Merrick's success in executing this vision for the city would catch the attention of Spain's King, Alfonso XIII, who awarded Merrick the Order of Isabella the Catholic for his support of Spanish culture in Coral Gables.

Several other cities in southern Florida showcased the Spanish Revival of the time, including Palm Beach. The Palm Beach Town Hall, built in 1925 by Harvey and Clarke, with renovations later made by several notable architects.

=== California ===
The major location of design and construction in the Spanish Colonial Revival style was California, especially in the coastal cities. In 1915, the San Diego Panama–California Exposition, with architects Bertram Goodhue and Carleton Winslow Sr., popularized the style in the state and nation. It is best exemplified in the California Quadrangle, built as the grand entrance to that Exposition. In the early 1920s, architect Lilian Jeannette Rice designed the style in the development of the town of Rancho Santa Fe in San Diego County.

The city of Santa Barbara adopted the style to give it a unified Spanish character after widespread destruction in the 1925 Santa Barbara earthquake. The County Courthouse, designed by William Mooser III, and the Arlington Theatre, designed by Edwards and Plunkett, are prime examples. George Washington Smith designed many residences in Santa Barbara, including Casa del Herrero and Jackling House, along with businesses Lobero Theatre and the Santa Barbara News-Press.

Real estate developer Ole Hanson favored the Spanish Colonial Revival style in his founding and development of San Clemente, California in 1928. The Pasadena City Hall by John Bakewell, Jr. and Arthur Brown, Jr., the Sonoma City Hall, and the Beverly Hills City Hall by Harry G. Koerner and William J. Gage are other notable civic examples in California. Between 1922 and 1931, architect Robert H. Spurgeon constructed 32 Spanish colonial revival houses in Riverside, and many of them have been preserved.

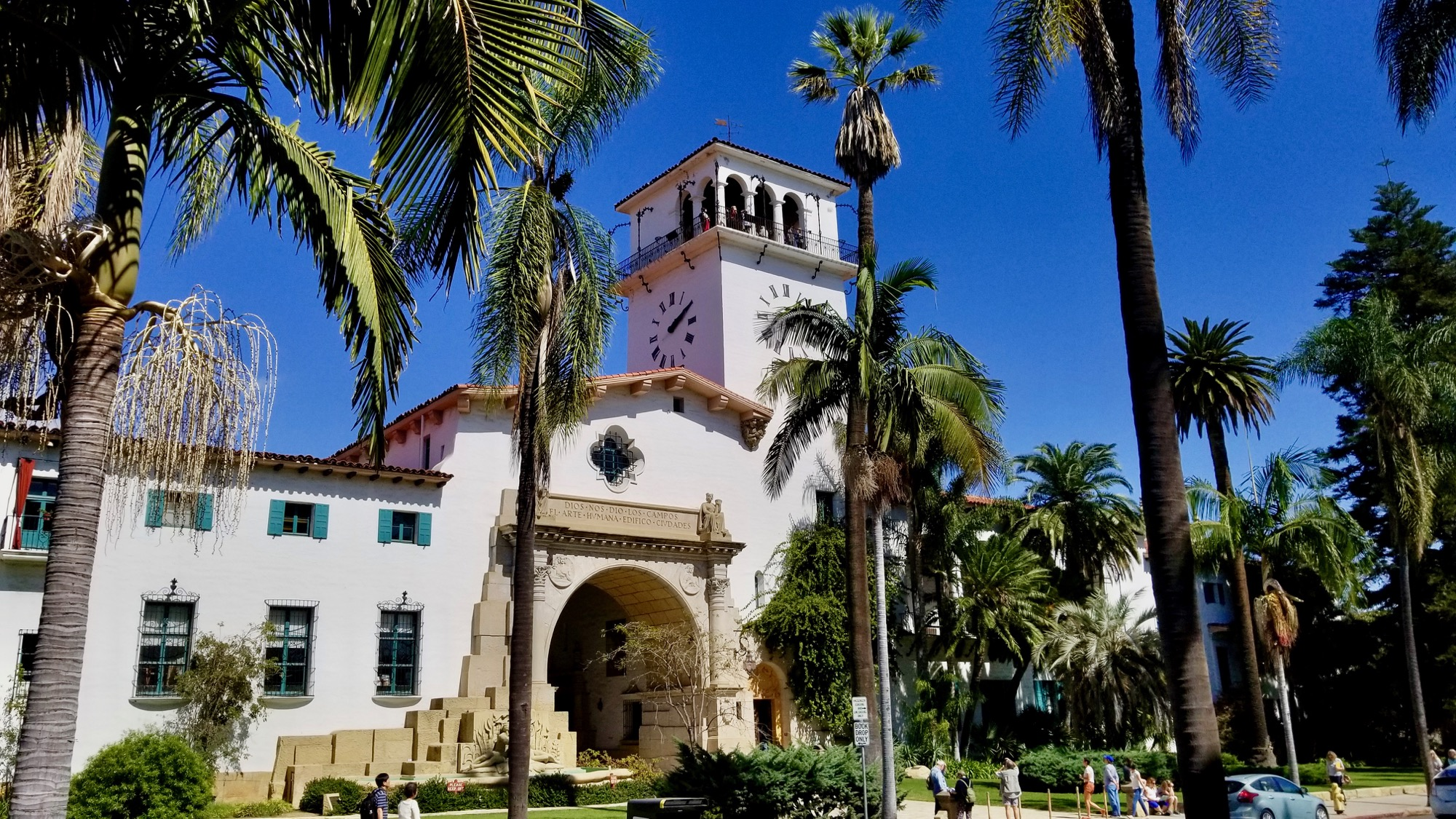
Santa Barbara County Courthouse in Santa Barbara, California (1926)

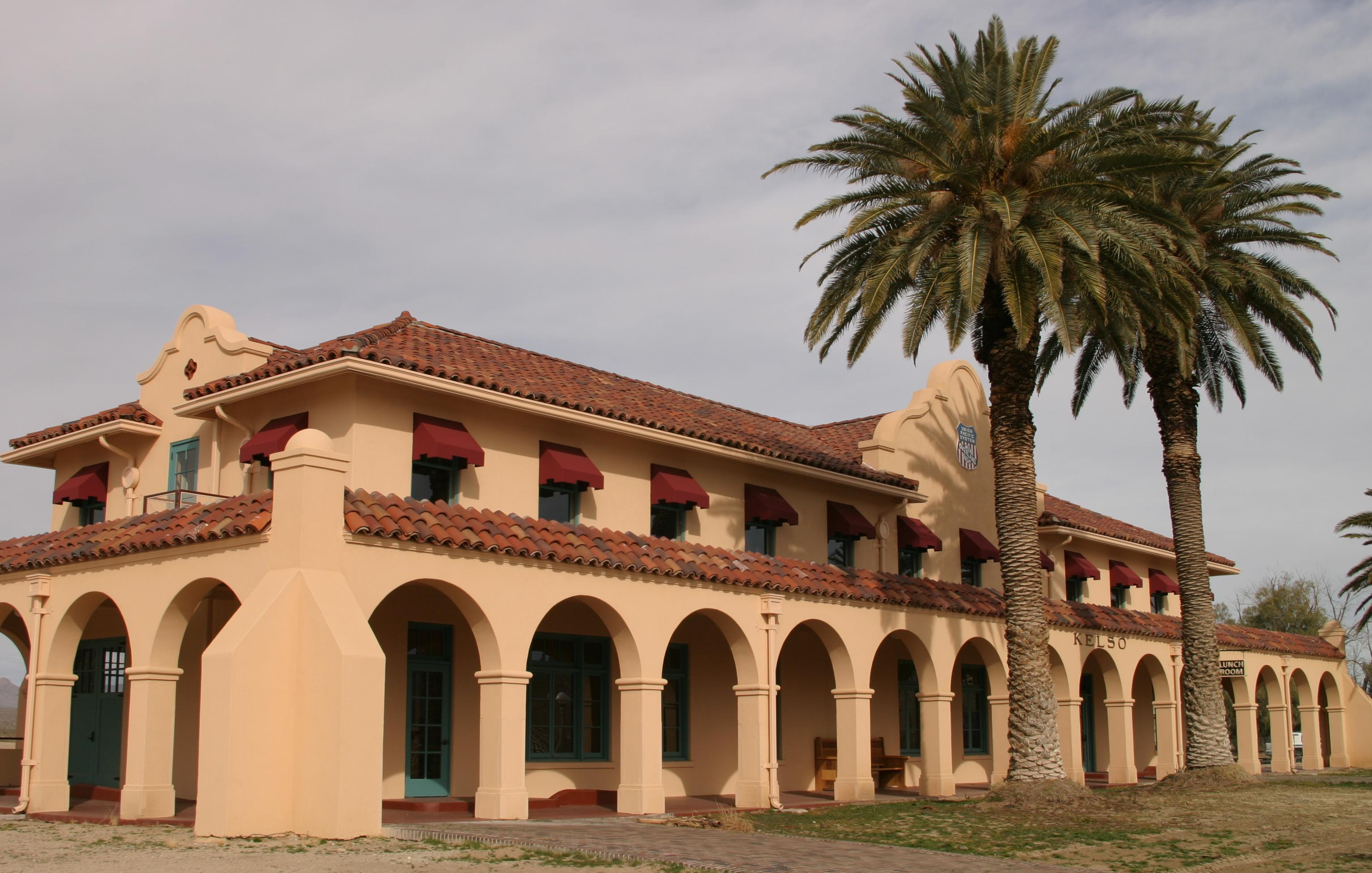
Kelso Hotel and Depot in the Mojave Desert, Southern California (1923)

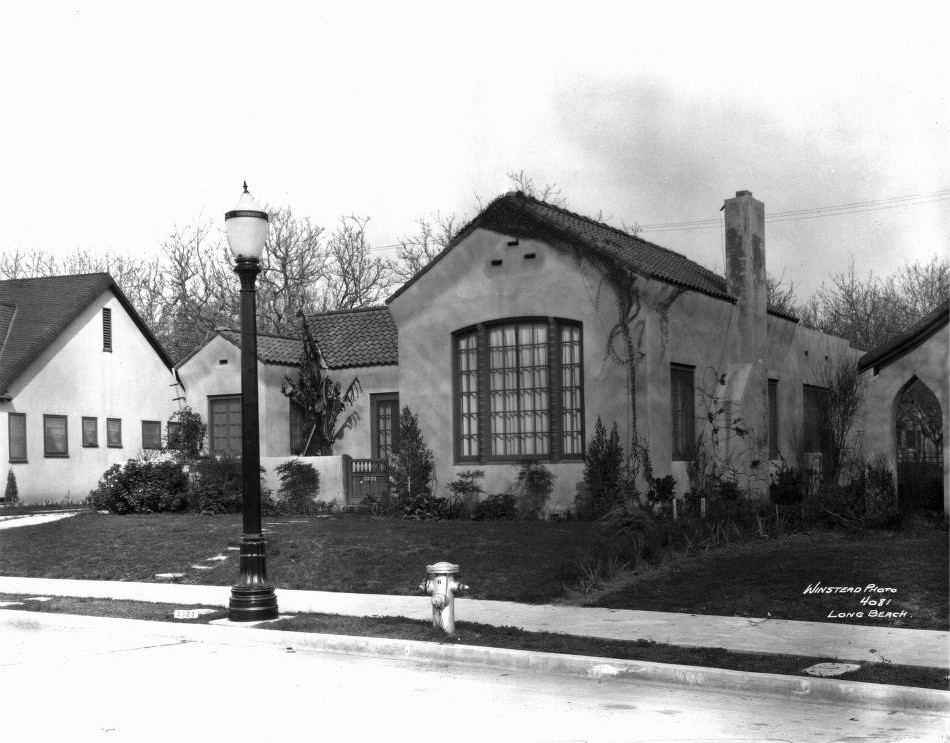
Spanish Colonial Revival house in California Heights, Long Beach, California, photographed in 1927

=== Texas ===
Spanish Colonial Revival architecture in Texas, especially in places like San Antonio, blends Spanish architectural styles with local influences. It features elements like low-pitched tile roofs, stucco walls, and arched entries, reflecting both the region's history and its suitability for the warm climate. This style was popular in the early 20th century and continues to be a distinctive feature of Texas architecture.

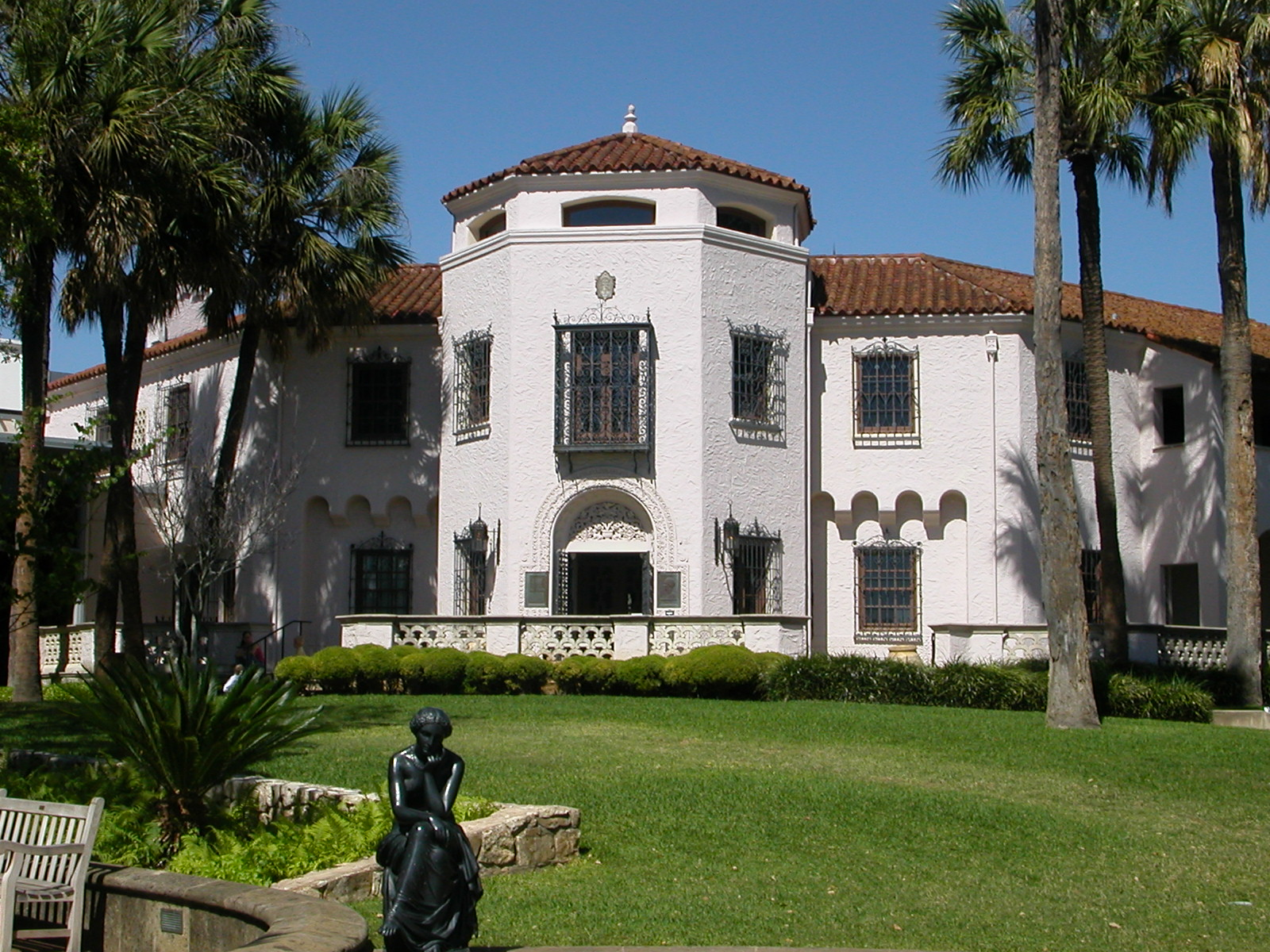
The McNay Art Museum in San Antonio, Texas

The McNay Art Museum, founded in 1950, is the first modern art museum in Texas. The museum was created by Mrs. McNay's original bequest of most of her fortune, her art collection and her 24-room Spanish Colonial Revival-style mansion that sits on 23 acres (93,000 m^{2}) that are landscaped with fountains, broad lawns and a Japanese-inspired garden and fishpond. The museum focuses primarily on 19th and 20th century European and American art by such artists as Paul Cézanne, Pablo Picasso, Paul Gauguin, Henri Matisse, Georgia O'Keeffe, Diego Rivera, Mary Cassatt, and Edward Hopper. The collection today consists of over 14,000 objects of contemporary art and sculpture. The museum also is home to the Tobin Collection of Theater Arts, and a research library with over 30,000 volumes.

=== Mexico ===
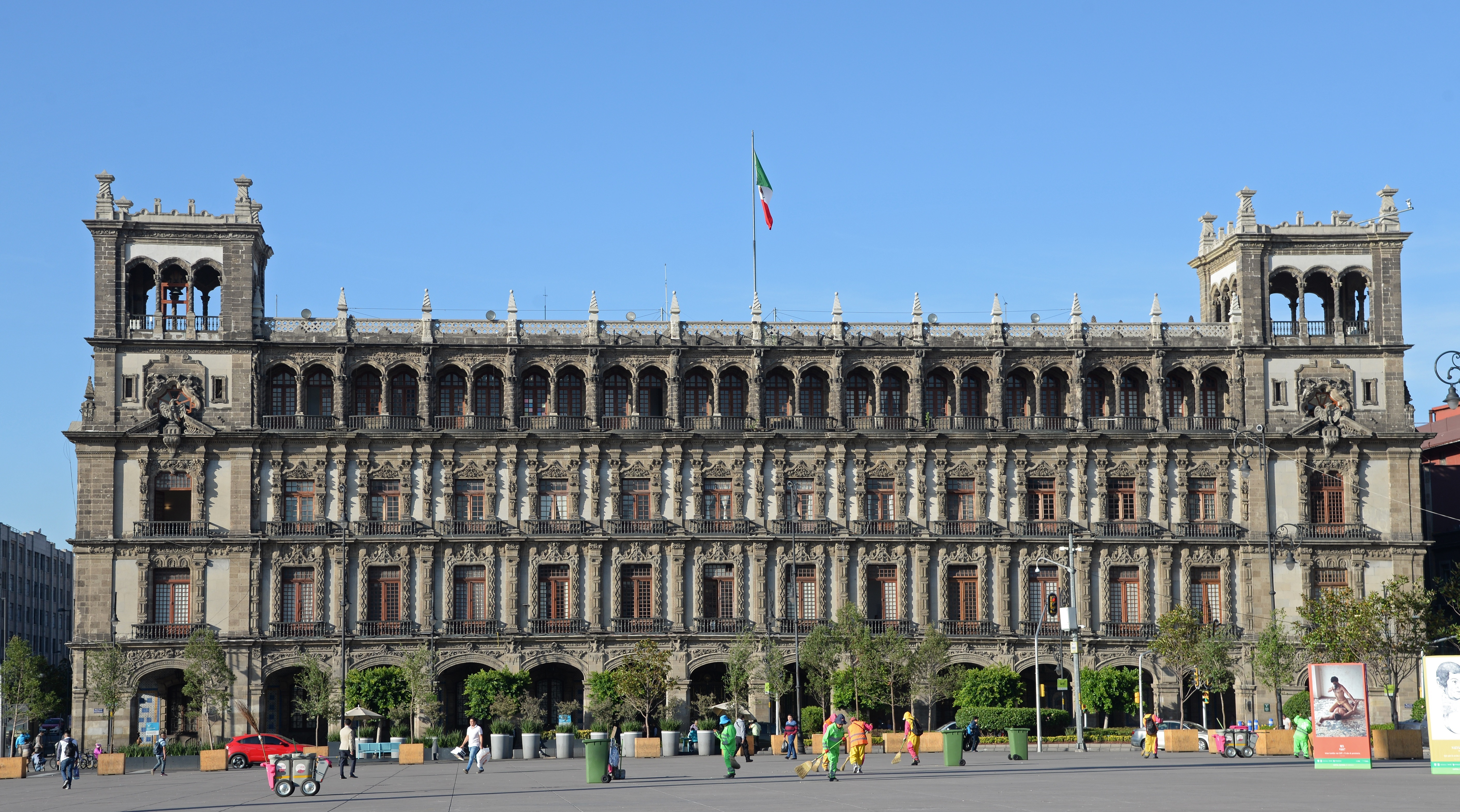
The neocolonial companion building (1940s) to the colonial Mexico City palace of the ayuntamiento

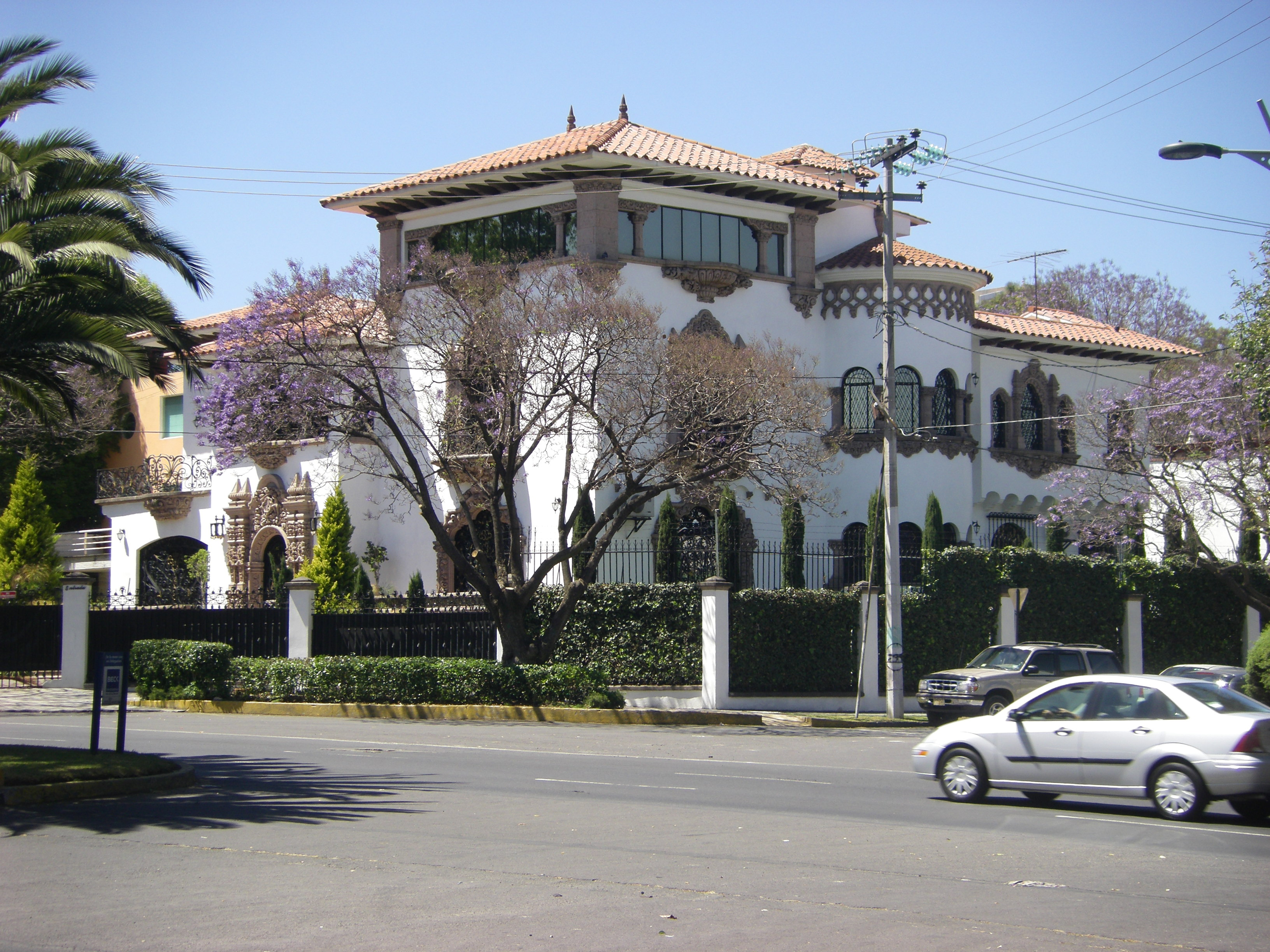
INBA-catalogued house built in the colonial californiano style in Lomas de Chapultepec in Mexico City (1930s)

The Spanish Colonial Revival of Mexico has a distinct origin from the style developed in the United States. Following the Mexican Revolution, there was a wave of nationalism that emphasized national culture, including in architecture. The neocolonial style arose as a response to European eclecticism (favored during the Porfiriato). The 1915 book La patria y la arquitectura nacional by architect Federico E. Mariscal (es) was influential in advocating viceregal architecture as integral to national identity. During the government of President Venustiano Carranza (serving 1917 to 1920), tax exemptions were offered to those that built houses in a colonial style. In the early 1920s there was a surge of houses built with Plateresque elements; such as grotesques, pinnacles and mixtilinear arches (es).

Secretary of Education José Vasconcelos (who shaped the cultural philosophy of the post-Revolution government) was an active promoter of neocolonial architecture. Traditional materials such as tezontle, cantera and Talavera tiles were incorporated into neocolonial buildings.

The colonial-era National Palace was significantly altered between 1926 and 1929: the addition of a third floor and changes to the facade. The modifications were done in a manner corresponding to the original style. Similarly, the colonial Mexico City government building was remodeled in the 1920s and a neocolonial companion building was built in the 1940s.

==== Colonial californiano ====
The style, as developed in the United States, came full circle to its geographic point of inspiration as in the late 1930s, single-family houses were built in Mexico City's then-new upscale neighborhoods in what is known in Mexico as colonial californiano (Californian Colonial). That is, a Mexican reinterpretation of the California interpretation of Spanish Colonial Revival. Many houses of this style can still be seen in the Colonia Nápoles, Condesa, Polanco and Lomas de Chapultepec areas of Mexico City. The Pasaje Polanco shopping court is an example of the style's application in commercial architecture.

=== Australia ===
Influential Australian architects such as Emil Sodersten and Professor Leslie Wilkinson brought back styles from Italy and Spain in the early 20th century convinced that Mediterranean styles would be well-suited for the Australian climate and lifestyle. Mediterranean style became popular in places like Sydney suburbs Manly and Bondi in the 1920s and 1930s. One variant, known as Spanish Mission or Hollywood Spanish, became popular as Australians saw films of and read in magazines about the glamorous mansions in that style that Hollywood movie stars had. Spanish mission houses began to appear in the wealthier suburbs, the most famous being Boomerang, at Elizabeth Bay. The Plaza Theatre in Sydney is a celebrated cinema in the style.

=== China ===
In the 1930s, numerous houses in Spanish Revival style were built in Shanghai, particularly in the former French Concession. Although Shanghai was not culturally linked to the Spanish-speaking world, these buildings were probably inspired by Hollywood movies, which were highly influential in the city at the time. Local architectural magazines of the period like The Chinese Architect and The Builder regularly printed detailed examples of the style for local builders to copy and implement.

=== Spanish East Indies ===
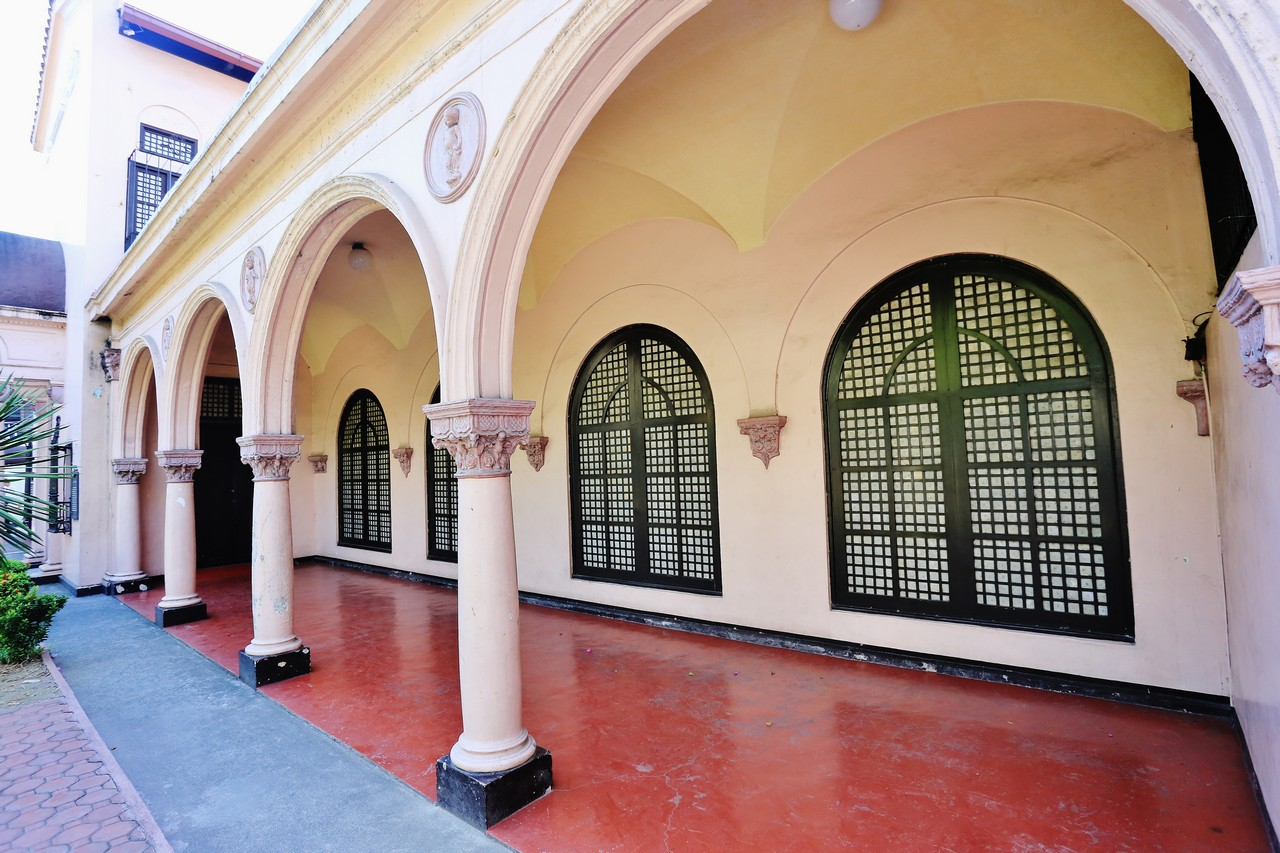
Gota de Leche Building in Manila, Philippines (1915)

After being Invaded, and for the most part being administered as a territory under the jurisdiction of the kingdom of New Spain (Mexico), the Philippines and Mariana islands received Iberian and Latin-American influences in its architecture. By the time the United States occupied the Philippines, the Mission-style and Spanish Colonial Revival architecture also arrived, with inspirations from California. American architects further developed this style in the Philippines, modernizing the buildings with American amenities.

The best example of the Spanish Colonial Revival architecture and California mission style is the famed Manila Hotel designed by William E. Parsons and built in 1909. Other examples exist throughout the country such as Gota de Leche, Paco Market, and thousands more, especially in the churches and cathedrals throughout the country.

== Design elements ==
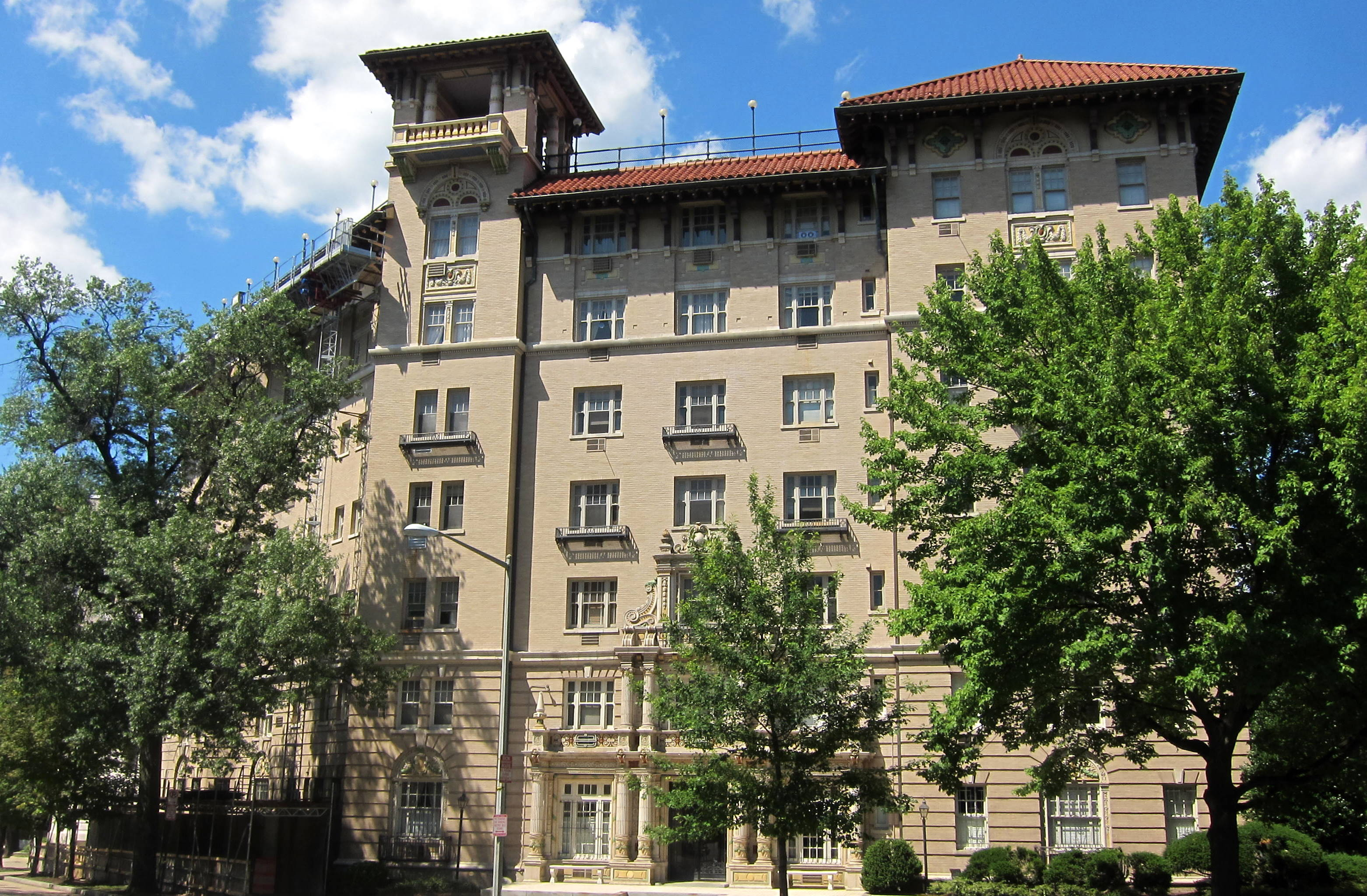
The Woodward Condominium in Washington, D.C. (1910)

Spanish Colonial Revival architecture shares some elements with the earlier Mission Revival style derived from the architecture of the California missions, and Pueblo Revival style from the traditional Puebloan peoples in New Mexico. Both precedents were popularized in the Western United States by Fred Harvey and his Atchison, Topeka and Santa Fe Railway Depots and Hotels. The Spanish Colonial Revival style is also influenced by the American Craftsman style and Arts and Crafts Movement.

Spanish Colonial Revival architecture is characterized by a combination of detail from several eras of Spanish Baroque, Spanish Colonial, Moorish Revival and Mexican Churrigueresque architecture. The style is marked by the prodigious use of smooth plaster (stucco) wall and chimney finishes, low-pitched clay tile, shed, or flat roofs, and terracotta or cast concrete ornaments. Other characteristics typically include small porches or balconies, Roman or semi-circular arcades and fenestration, wood casement or tall, double–hung windows, canvas awnings, and decorative iron trim.

Structural form:

- Rectangular, courtyard, or L-plan.
- Horizontal massing.
- Predominantly one-story.
- Interior or exterior courtyards.
- Asymmetrical shape with cross-gables and side wings.

== Notable architects ==
One of the most accomplished architects of the style was George Washington Smith who practiced during the 1920s in Santa Barbara, California. His own residences El Hogar (1916, a.k.a. Casa Dracaena) and Casa del Greco (1920) brought him commissions from local society in Montecito and Santa Barbara. An example landmark house he designed is the Steedman estate Casa del Herrero in Montecito, now a registered National Historic Landmark and restored historic house—landscape museum. Other examples are the Jackling House and Lobero Theatre also in California.

=== In California ===
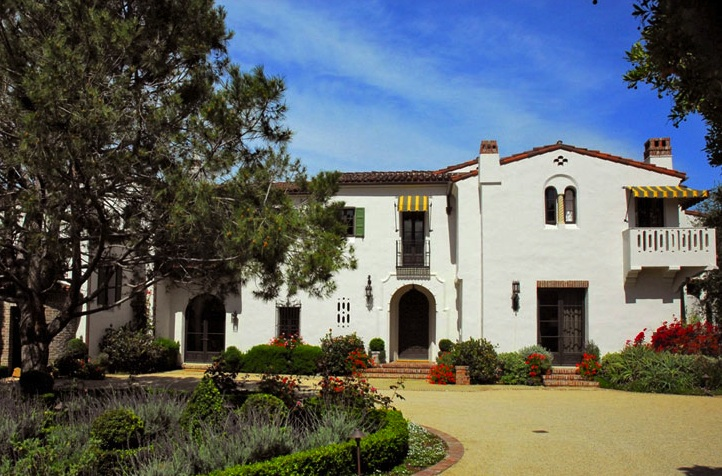
El Sueño, designed by Kevin A. Clark

Bertram Goodhue and Carleton Winslow initiated the style as the dominant historical regional style in California; they also influenced Hawaiian architecture in the 1920s. Notable in Californian architecture were the following architects:

- John Byers, AIA
- Birge Clark, FAIA
- Edwards and Plunkett
- Elmer Grey, AIA
- Sumner P. Hunt, AIA
- Reginald Johnson, FAIA
- William Templeton Johnson, FAIA
- Julia Morgan, AIA (AIA Gold Medalist)
- Wallace Neff, FAIA
- Lionel Pries
- Richard Requa
- Lilian Jeannette Rice, AIA
- Lutah Maria Riggs, FAIA
- Clarence J. Smale
- George Washington Smith
- Robert H. Spurgeon Jr.
- Paul Revere Williams, FAIA (AIA Gold Medalist)

Currently:

- Kevin A. Clark
- Marc Appleton, AIA
- Michael Burch, FAIA
- Thomas Bollay, AIA

=== In Florida ===
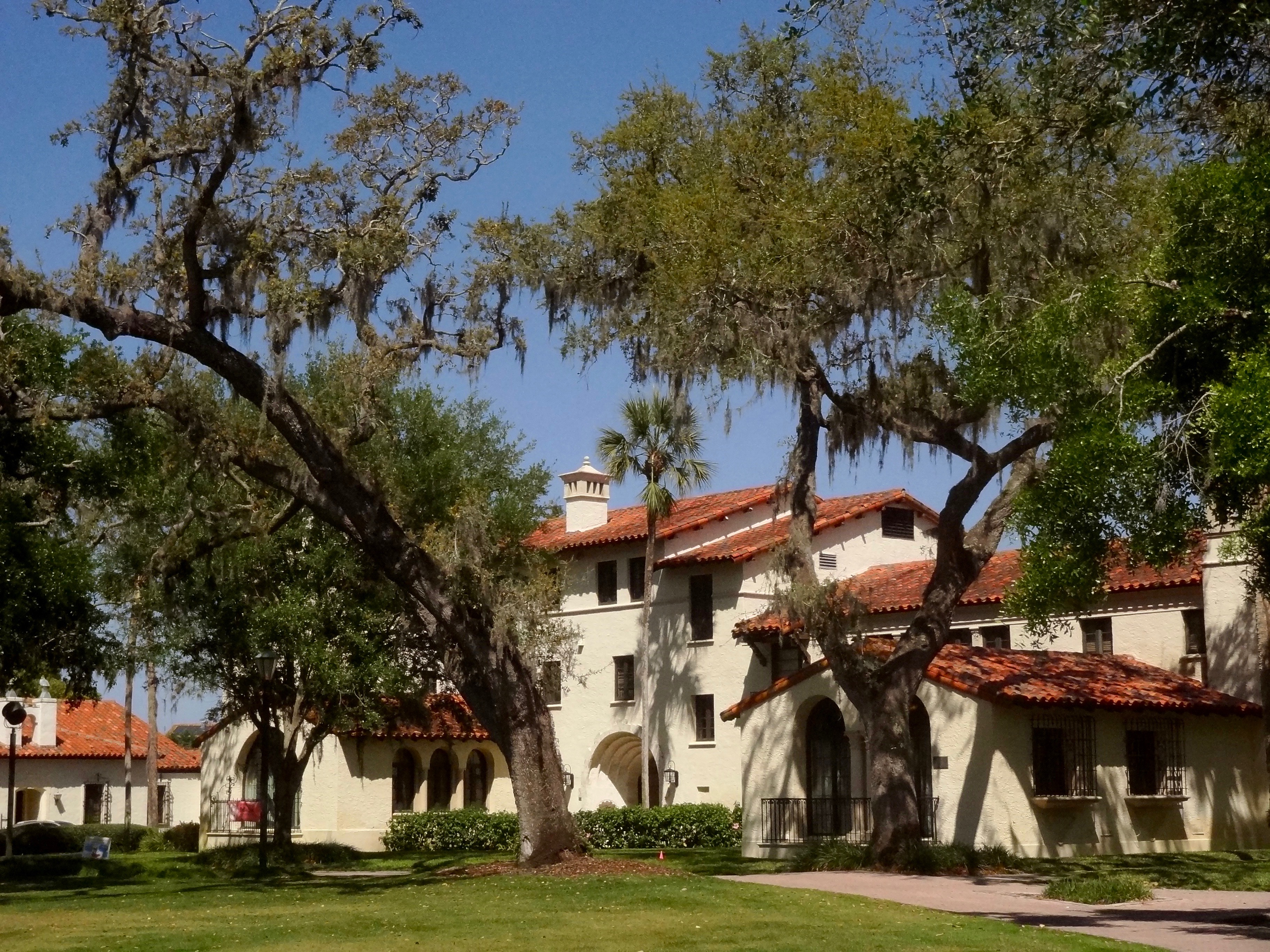
Rollins College in Winter Park, Florida

In Florida notable architects include:

- John Elliot
- Maurice Fatio, AIA
- Harry Griffin, AIA
- Richard Kiehnel, AIA of Kiehnel and Elliott
- Ryan and Roberts
- Addison Mizner
- Wallace Neff, FAIA
- Harvey and Clarke
- Albert Pierce
- James Gamble Rogers II, FAIA
- Schultze & Weaver
- Robert Weed, FAIA
- Marion Wyeth, FAIA

=== In Hawaii ===
- Louis Davis
- G. Robert Miller, AIA
- Bertram Goodhue FAIA's junior partner, Hardie Phillip, FAIA

== List of example structures ==
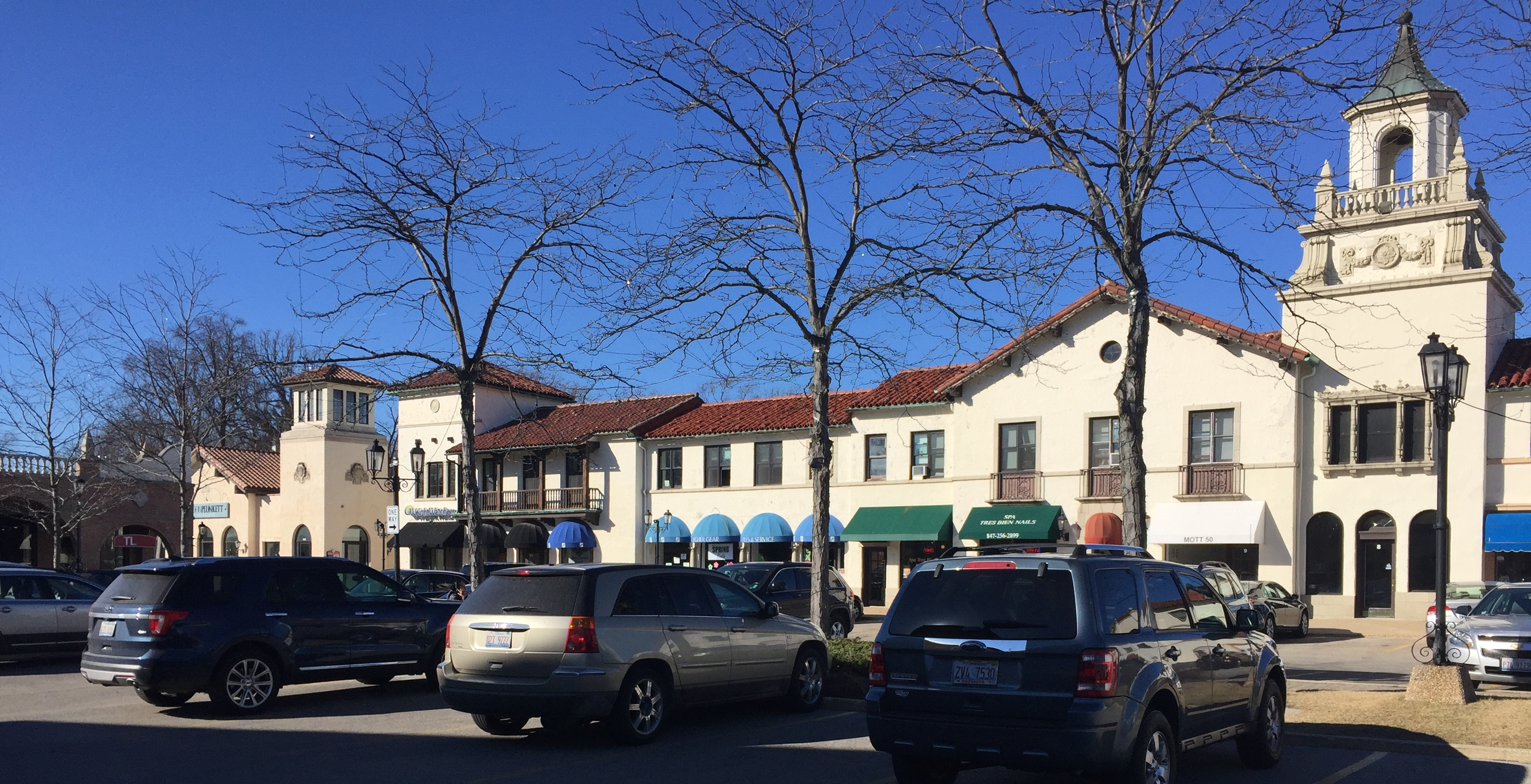
Plaza del Lago, Wilmette, Illinois (1920s)

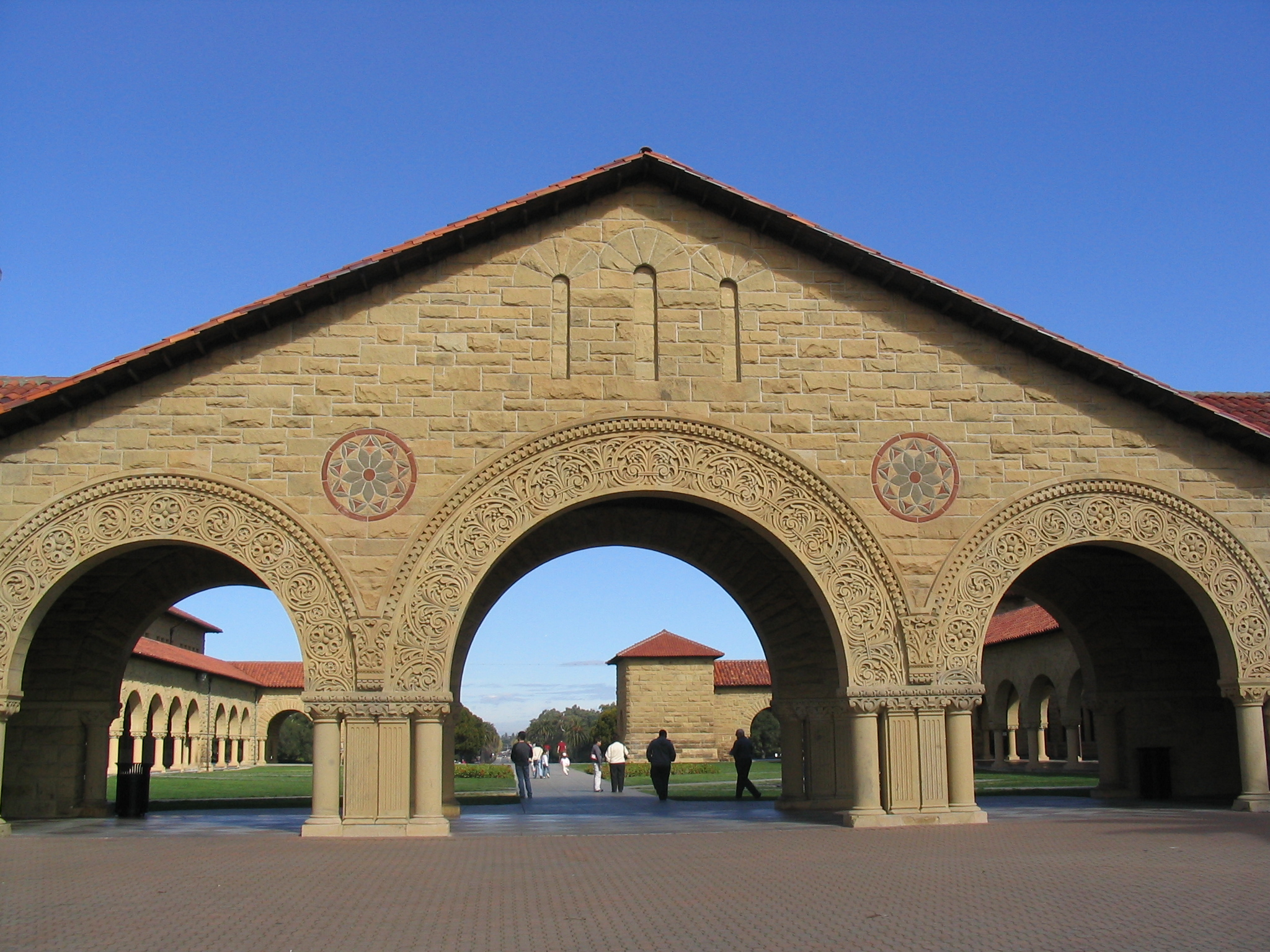
Stanford University's main quad

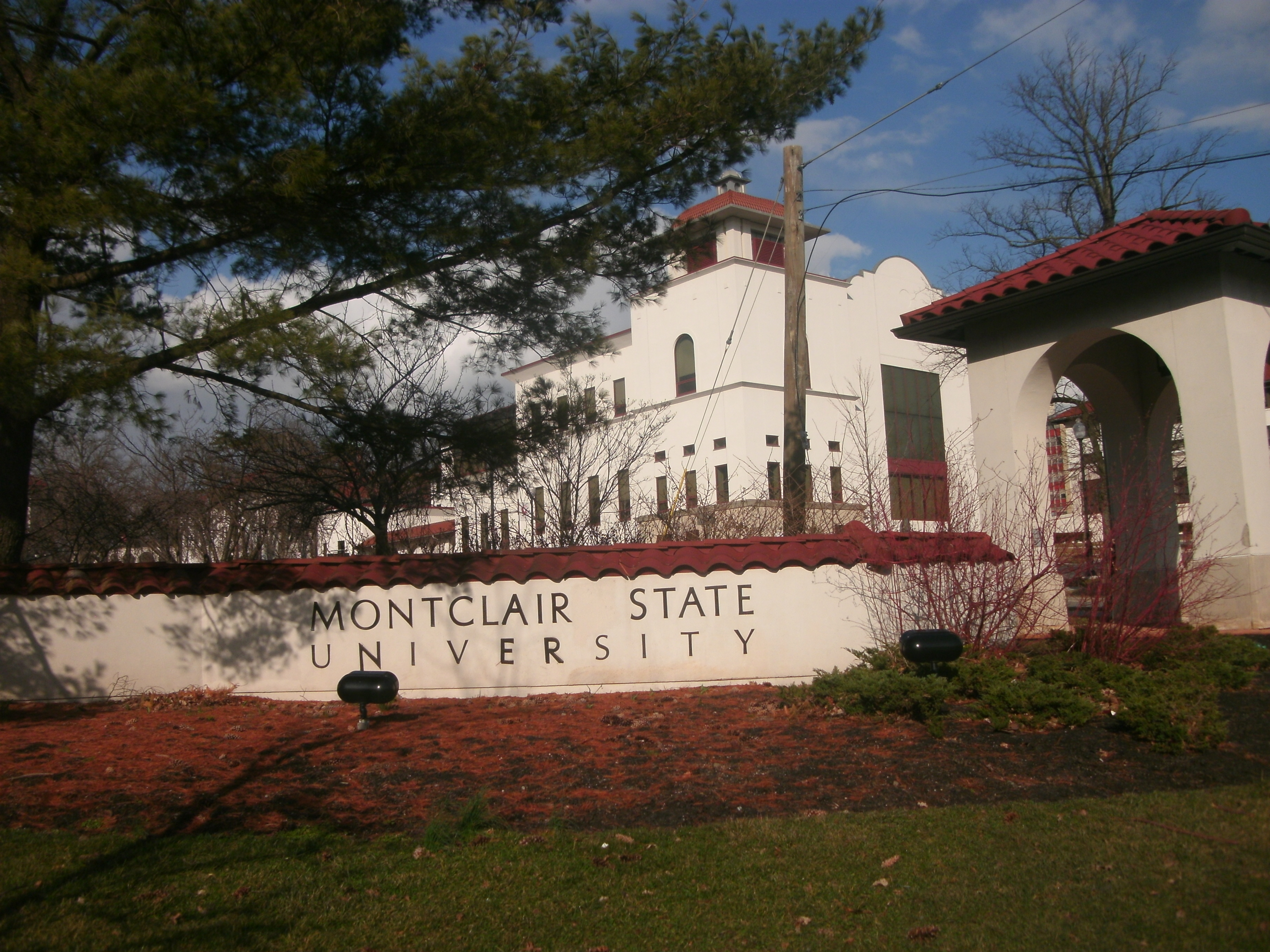
Main entrance to Montclair State University in Montclair, New Jersey

- California Quadrangle and El Prado, Balboa Park, San Diego, California: by Bertram Goodhue, for the Panama–California Exposition (1915-15).
- Freedom Tower (Spanish: Torre de la Libertad) in Miami, Florida, was designed by Schultze and Weaver and originally served as the headquarters for The Miami News, completed in 1925.
- Casa del Herrero, Montecito, California, architects George Washington Smith and Lutah Maria Riggs, 1926.
- Several buildings at Montclair State University in Montclair, New Jersey, the first being College Hall, constructed in 1908.
- The current Museo de Arte Hispanoamericano Isaac Fernández Blanco or Noel Palace, designed by Martín Noel in Buenos Aires, Argentina, 1920–1924.
- The Main Quad and many buildings in the campus of Stanford University, designed by Frederick Law Olmsted, 1886–1891.
- "Casa Dracaena" (a.k.a. El Hogar or Heberton House), George Washington Smith residence #1, 1916.
- Glendale Southern Pacific Railroad Depot, by Maurice Couchot & Kenneth MacDonald, Jr. in Glendale, California, opened 1923.
- Brophy College Chapel, by John R. Kibbey of Lescher & Mahoney, in Phoenix, Arizona, serves as the main chapel for Brophy College Preparatory, a Jesuit high school, built in 1928.
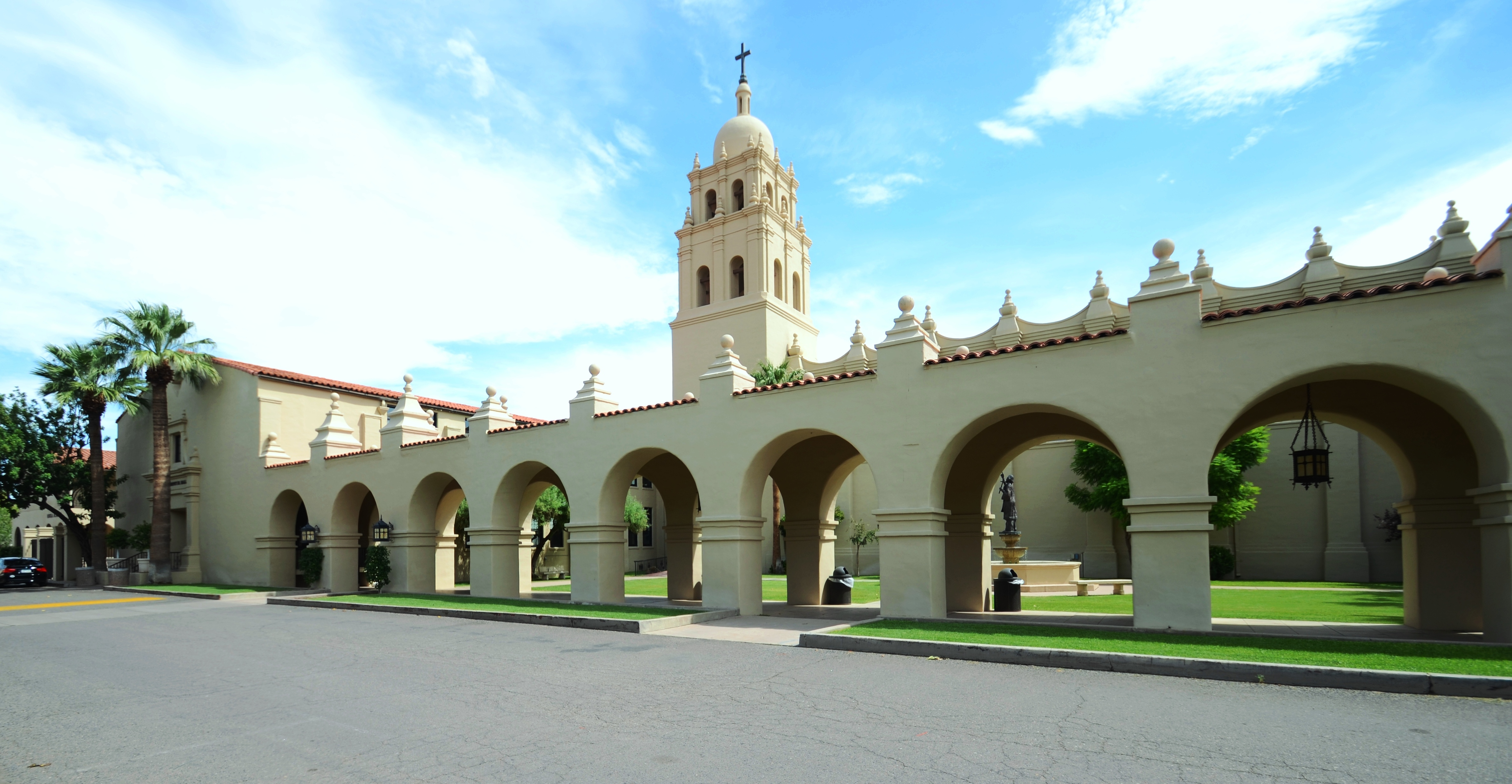
  Brophy College Chapel at Brophy College Preparatory in Phoenix, Arizona
- Santa Barbara County Courthouse, by William Mooser III, in Santa Barbara, California, completed 1929.
- George Fearn House in Mobile, Alabama, completed 1904.
- Farmer's Bank in Vero Beach, Florida, completed in 1914.
- Adamson House, "Taj Mahal of Tile" by Stiles O. Clements, in Malibu, California, completed 1930.
- Alice Lynch Residence in Los Angeles, California, completed in 1922.
- Marine Corps Recruit Depot, San Diego, California, 1917–1930.
- Naval Training Center, San Diego, California, completed 1923 (Buildings 1–26, and Officer's Quarters "A"-"D"). An expansion of recruit facilities in the same design language was completed in 1932 with the construction of the barracks at Camp Lawrence (Buildings 27-30). The final buildings built in the original Spanish Colonial Revival style were completed in 1942 with the opening of Camp Luce, including new Administration, classroom, library, and recreation buildings.
- Quapaw Baths building in Bathhouse Row, Hot Springs, Arkansas, completed in 1922.
- Coral Gables Congregational Church in Coral Gables, Florida, was designed by the architect Richard Kiehnel of Kiehnel and Elliott in 1923.
- Holy Trinity Episcopal Church in West Palm Beach, Florida, was designed by L. Phillips Clarke of Harvey and Clarke, completed 1924.
- C.E. Toberman Estate, by Russell & Alspagh, in Hollywood, California, completed 1924.
- Palm Beach Town Hall in Palm Beach, Florida, by Harvey and Clarke, completed 1925.
- "Casa de las Campañas" in Hancock Park district, Los Angeles, California, completed in 1928.
- Frank H. Upham House in Altadena, California, completed 1928.
- Azalea Court Apartments in Mobile, Alabama, completed in 1928.
- "La Casa Nueva", Workman and Temple Family Estate, in City of Industry, California, completed 1927.
- Castillo Serrallés in Ponce, Puerto Rico, completed in the 1930s.
- William S. Hart "La Loma de los Vientos" Ranch, arch. Arthur R. Kelly, Newhall, California, completed in the early 1920s.
- Gaylord Suites in San Francisco, California, completed in 1928.
- Randolph Air Force Base (various structures) near San Antonio, Texas, designed in 1929.
- Hollywood, Homewood, Alabama, a 1926 residential development in Homewood, Alabama.
- El Capitan Theatre, Hollywood, built in 1928.
- "Death Valley Ranch", "Scotty's Castle", a landmark in Death Valley National Park, which was begun in 1922 and had construction on the original design continue sporadically as late as 1943.
- Scripps College, by Gordon Kaufmann and Sumner Hunt, in Claremont, California, women's college and campus established in 1926 by Ellen Browning Scripps.
- Annie Russell Theatre, located on the premises of Rollins College in Winter Park, Florida was named after the English-born actress Annie Russell and was designed by Richard Kiehnel of Kiehnel and Elliott, constructed in 1931.
- Hamilton Air Force Base, in San Francisco Bay Area near Novato, California, completed in 1934.
- Pima County Courthouse in Tucson, Arizona, designed by Roy Place.
- Benedictine Monastery in Tucson, Arizona, also designed by Roy Place. http://www.tucsonmonastery.com/
- Louis P. and Clara K. Best Residence and Auto House, Clausen & Clausen, Davenport, Iowa, constructed in 1909.
- Pasadena City Hall, by Bakewell and Brown, in Pasadena, California, completed 1927.
- Hortonville Community Hall, by Robert Messmer, in Hortonville, Wisconsin, built in 1912.
- Thomas Jefferson Hotel in Birmingham, Alabama, opened in 1929.
- Adler Hotel in Sharon Springs, New York, built in 1928.
- El Reno Municipal Swimming Pool Bath House in El Reno, Oklahoma, completed in 1935.
- Plaza del Lago in Wilmette, Illinois, completed in 1928 by Henry Gage
- Camarillo State Hospital in Camarillo, California, first phase completed in 1936 by State Architect Howard Spencer Hazen, built to completion in 1957. With the hospital's closure in 1997, the site has been redeveloped into California State University Channel Islands (opened in 2002), with all the new college buildings retaining the Spanish Colonial Revival architecture and Mission Revival architecture, except the John Spoor Broome Library—the only modern-style building on campus.
- Antiga Estação Transmissora da Rádio Farroupilha (former Farroupilha Radio Broadcast Station), an example from Porto Alegre, city in far southern Brazil, opened in 1952, closed in 1986.

== Gallery ==
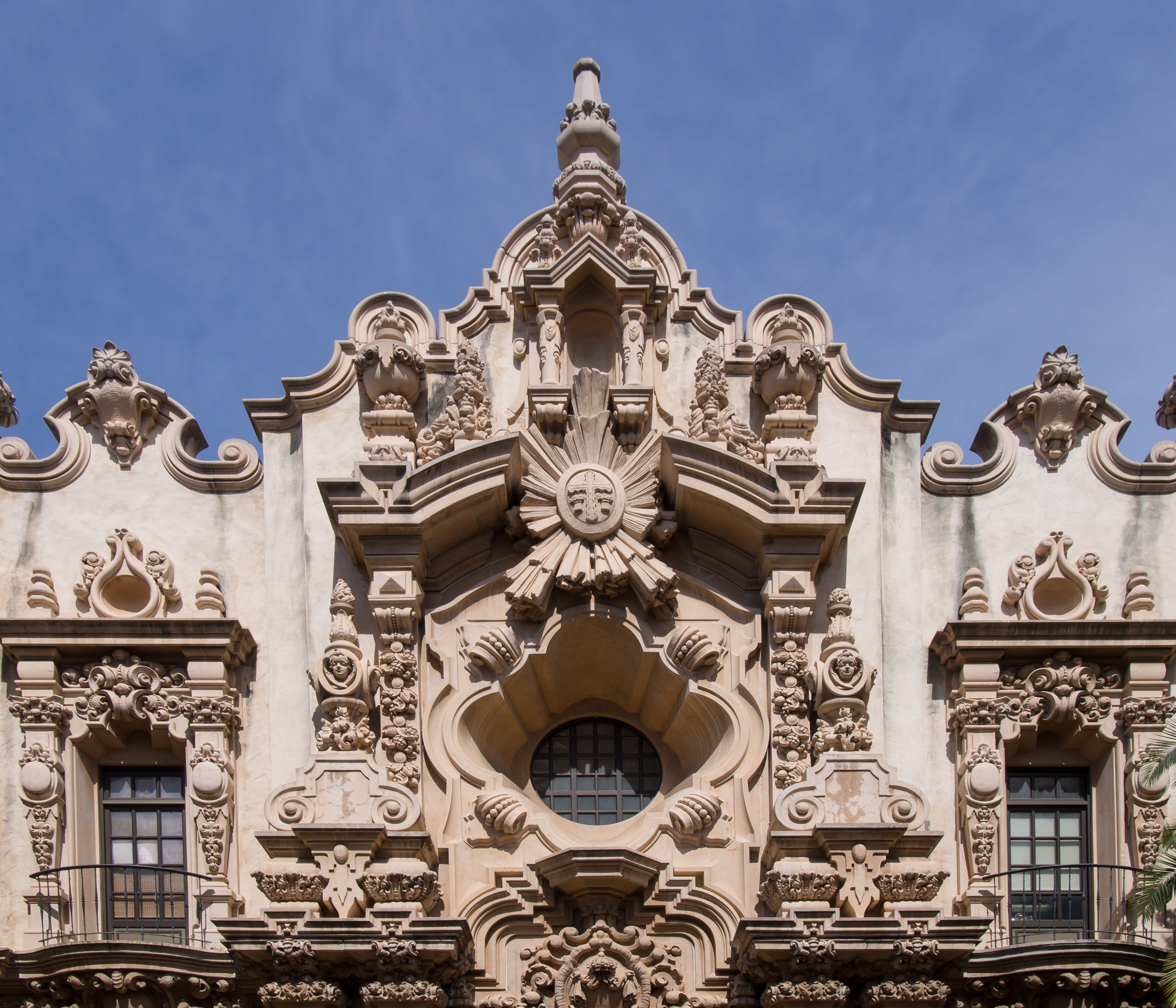
Casa del Prado Theatre & Balboa Park, San Diego, California (1915)

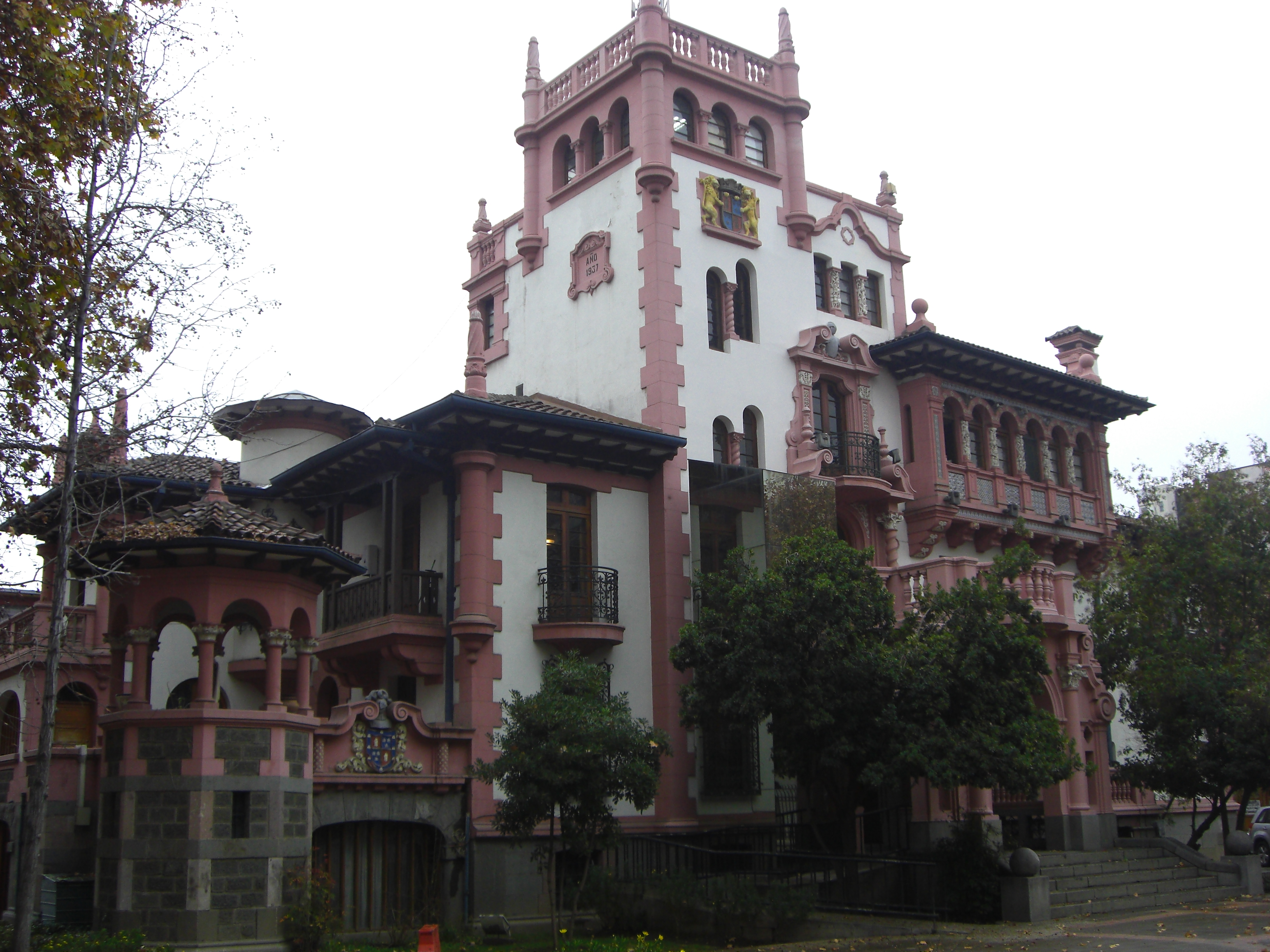
Vásquez Palace, in Macul, Chile (1931)

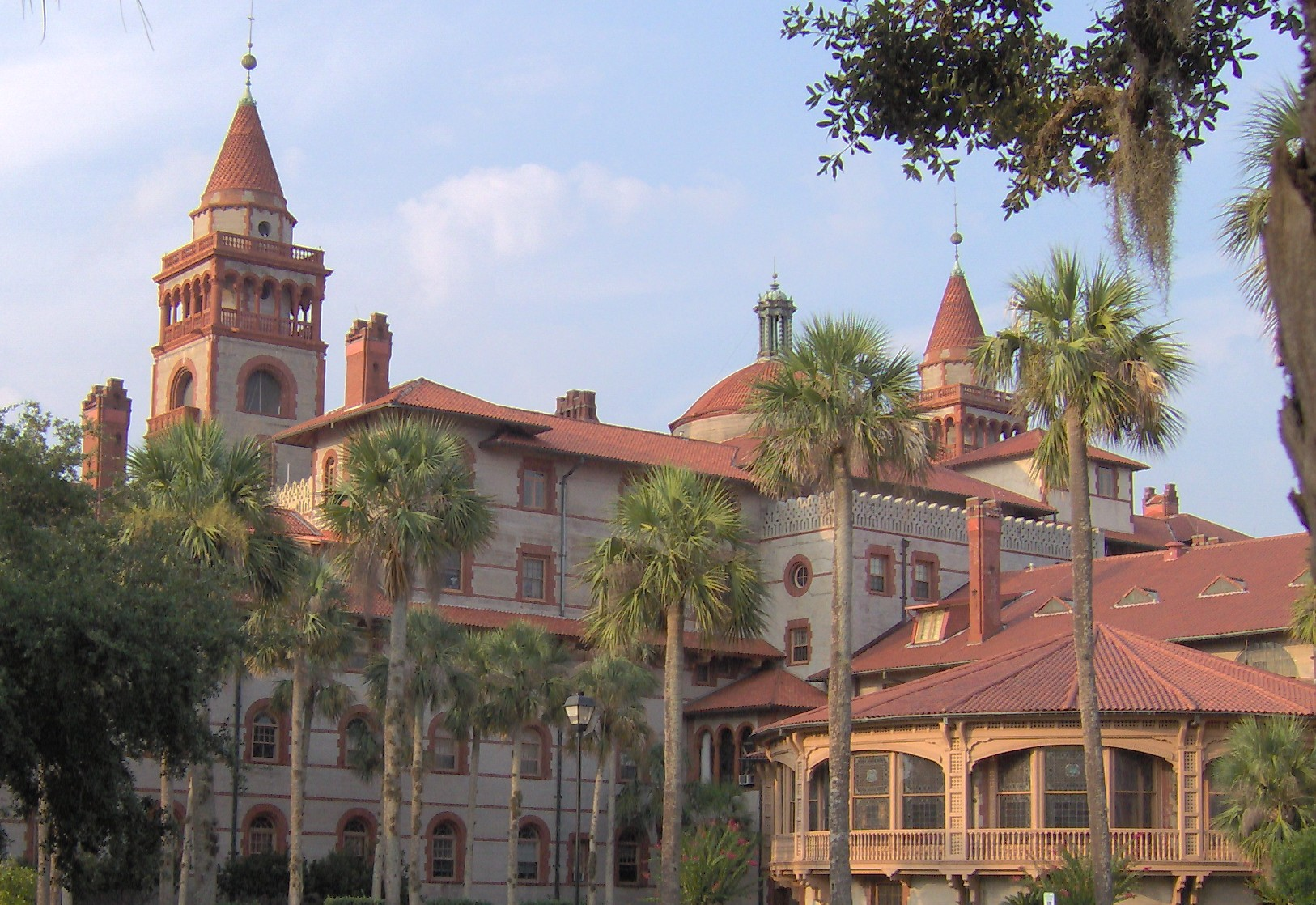
Once the luxurious Ponce de Leon Hotel (1888), since 1968 it has served as the centerpiece of the campus of Flagler College in St. Augustine, Florida.

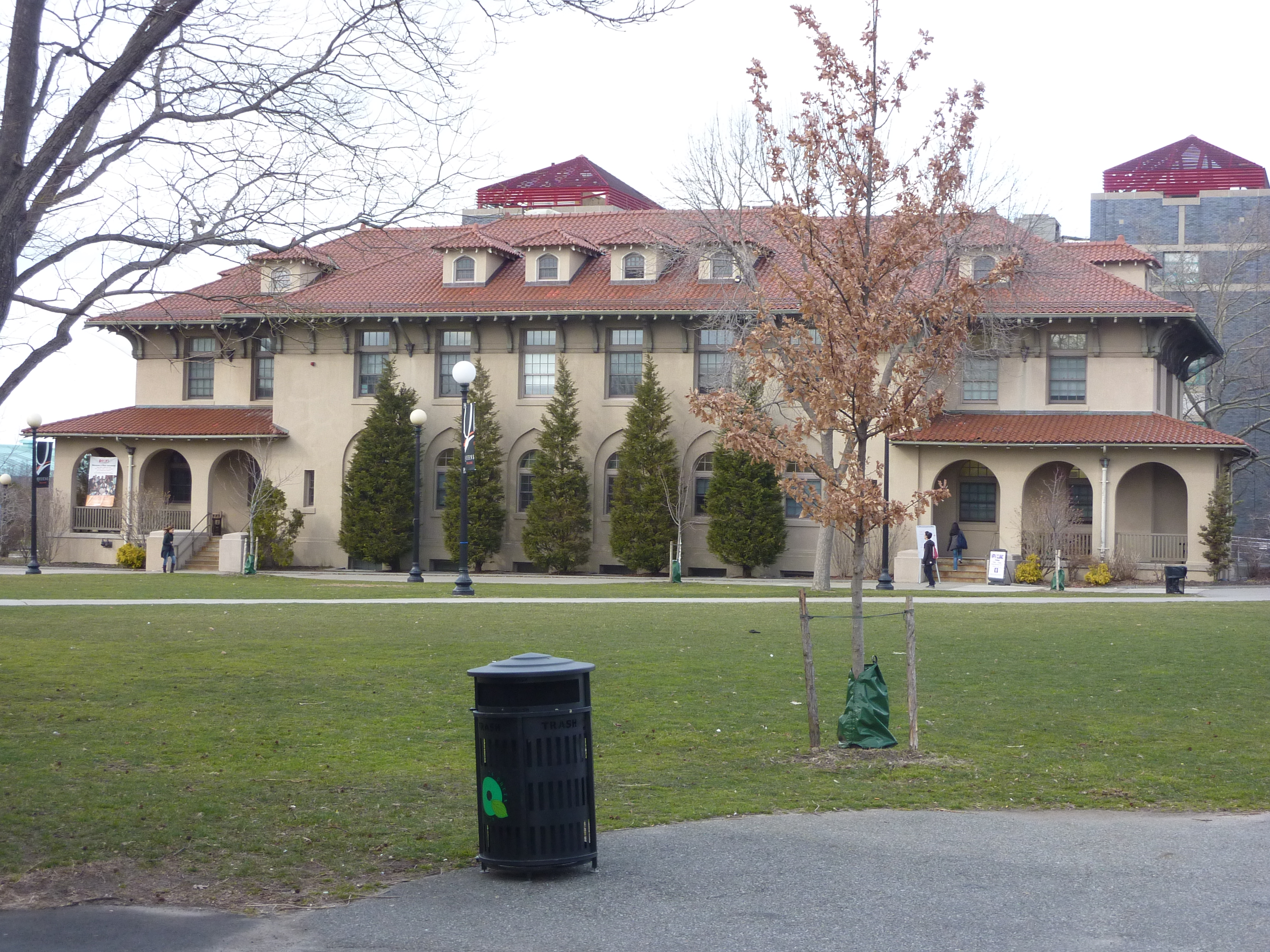
Queens College in New York City still uses many of its original Spanish-style buildings, which were built in the early 20th century.

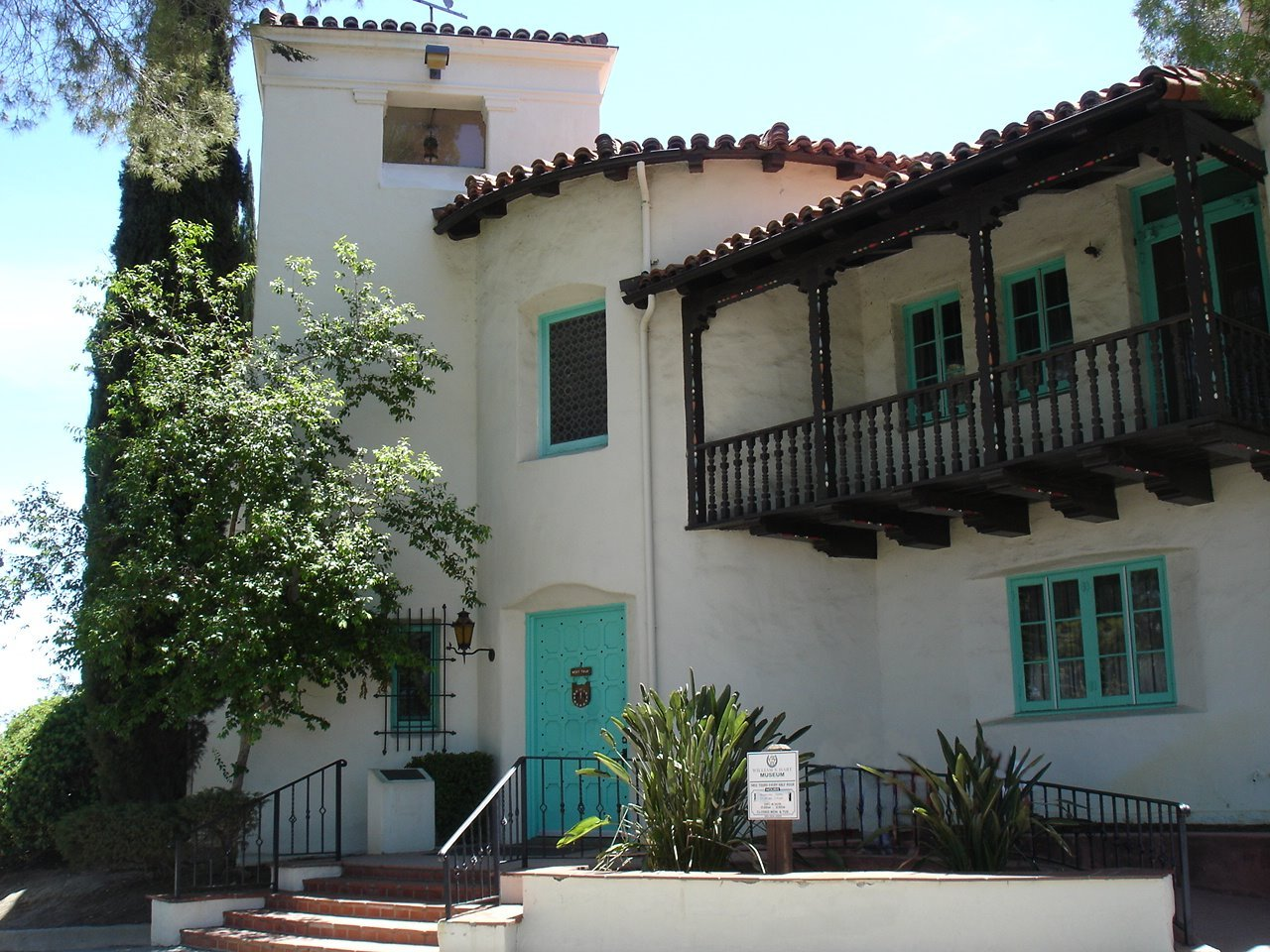
William S. Hart's La Loma de los Vientos, a 22-room house atop a prominent hill in Newhall, California, designed by architect Arthur R. Kelly and built between 1924 and 1928

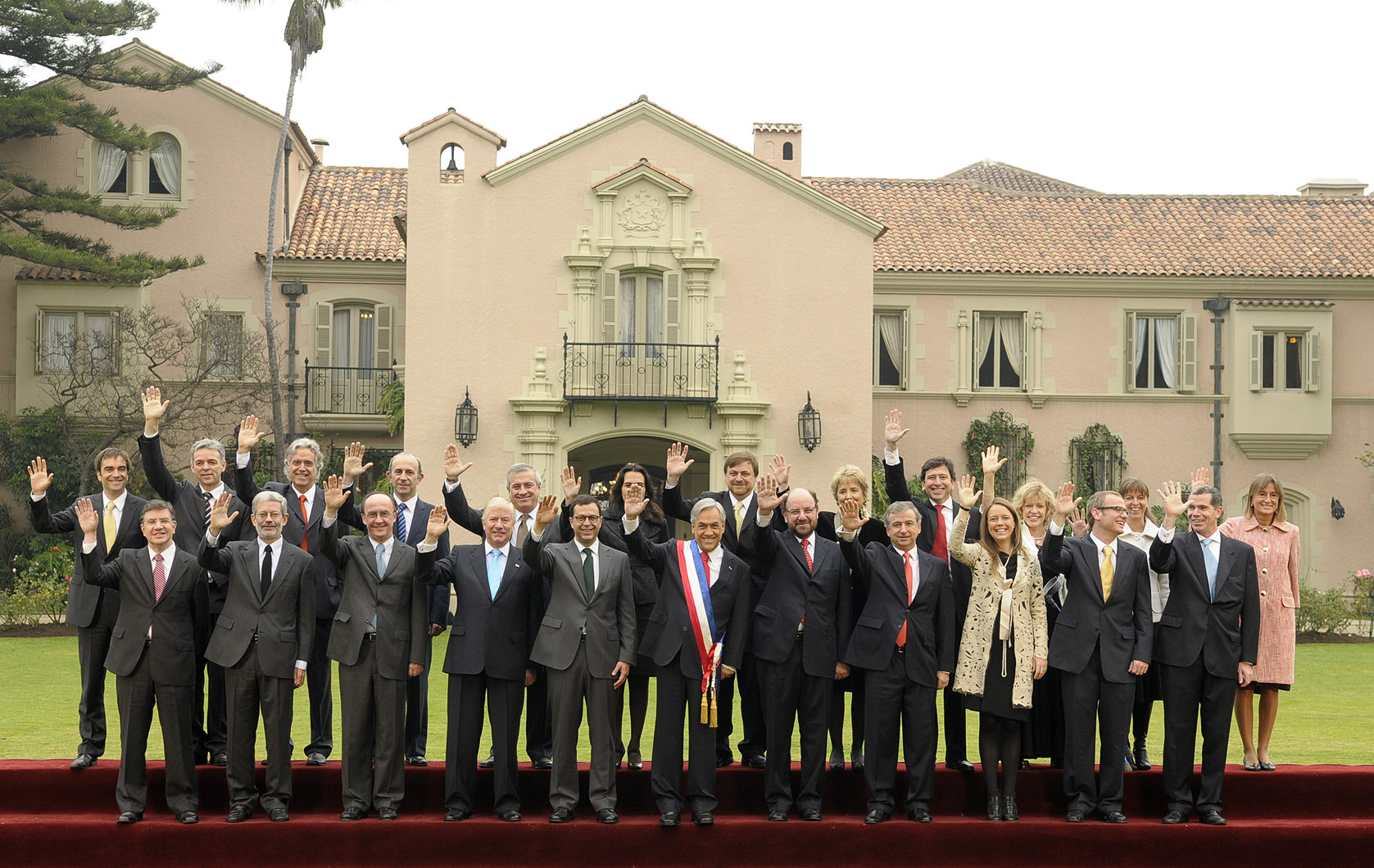
Presidential Palace in Cerro Castillo, Viña del Mar, Chile (1930)

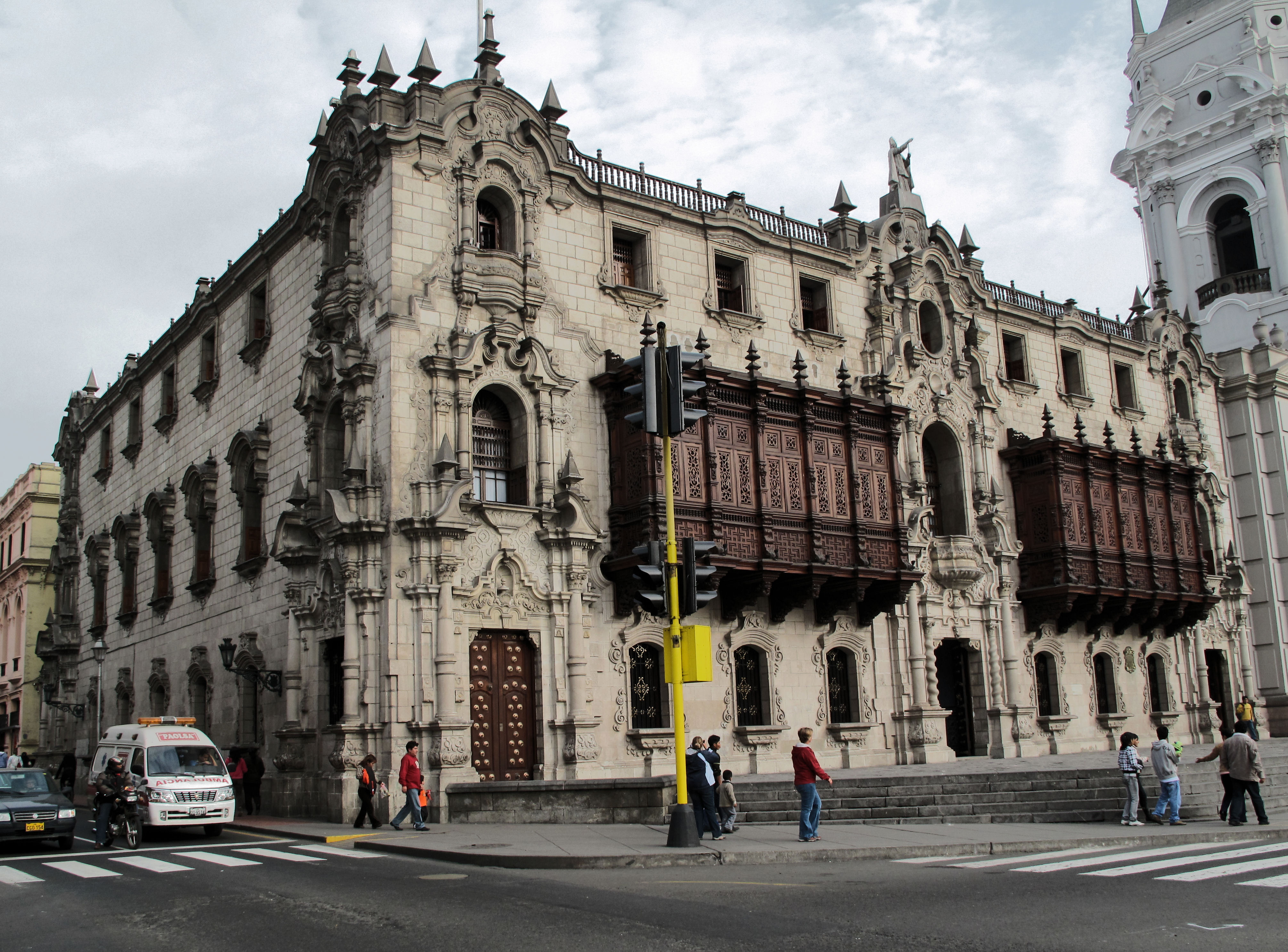
Archbishop's Palace of Lima, Lima, Peru (1924), which incorporates traditional limeño balconies

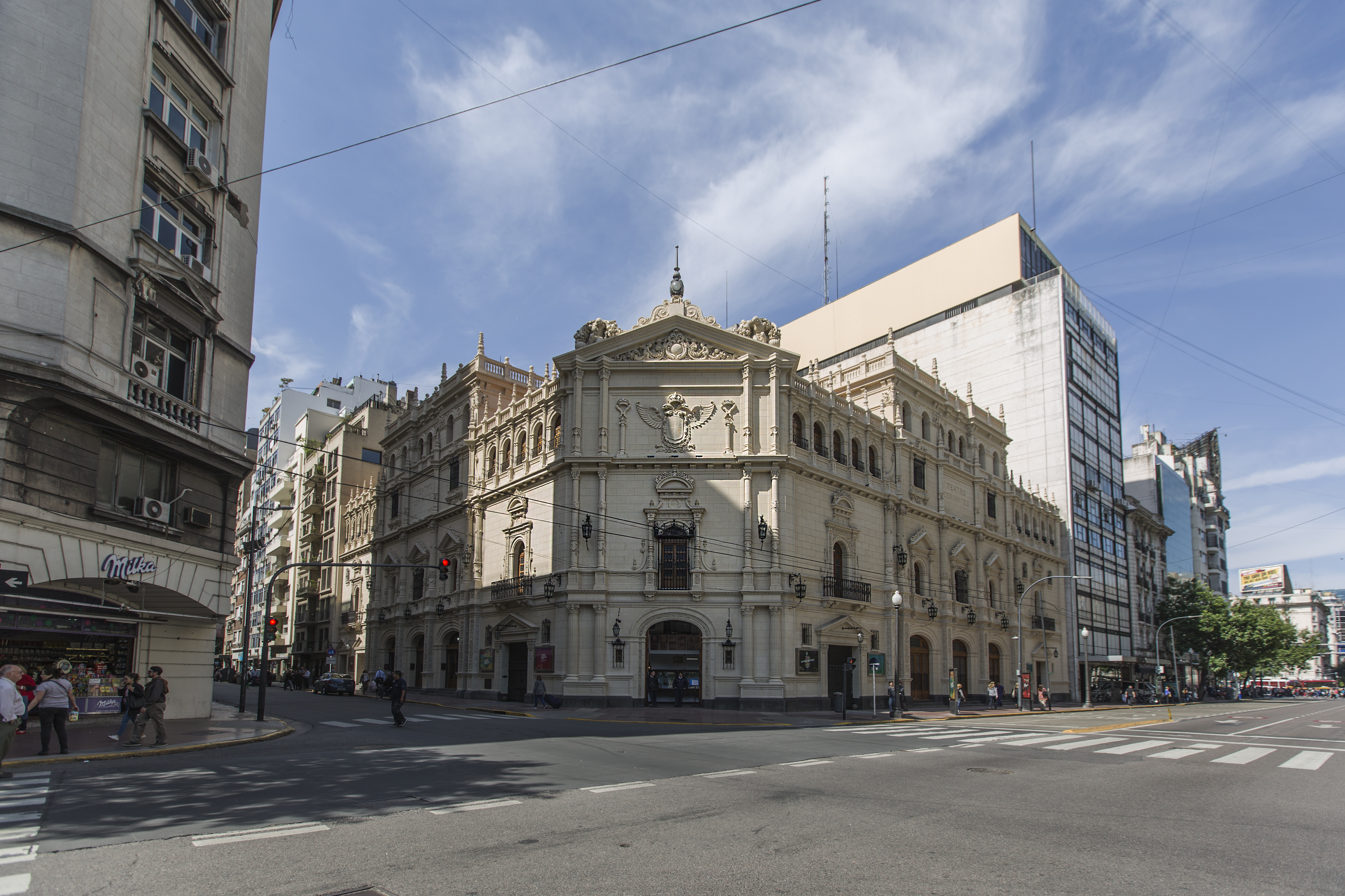
Cervantes National Theatre in Buenos Aires, Argentina

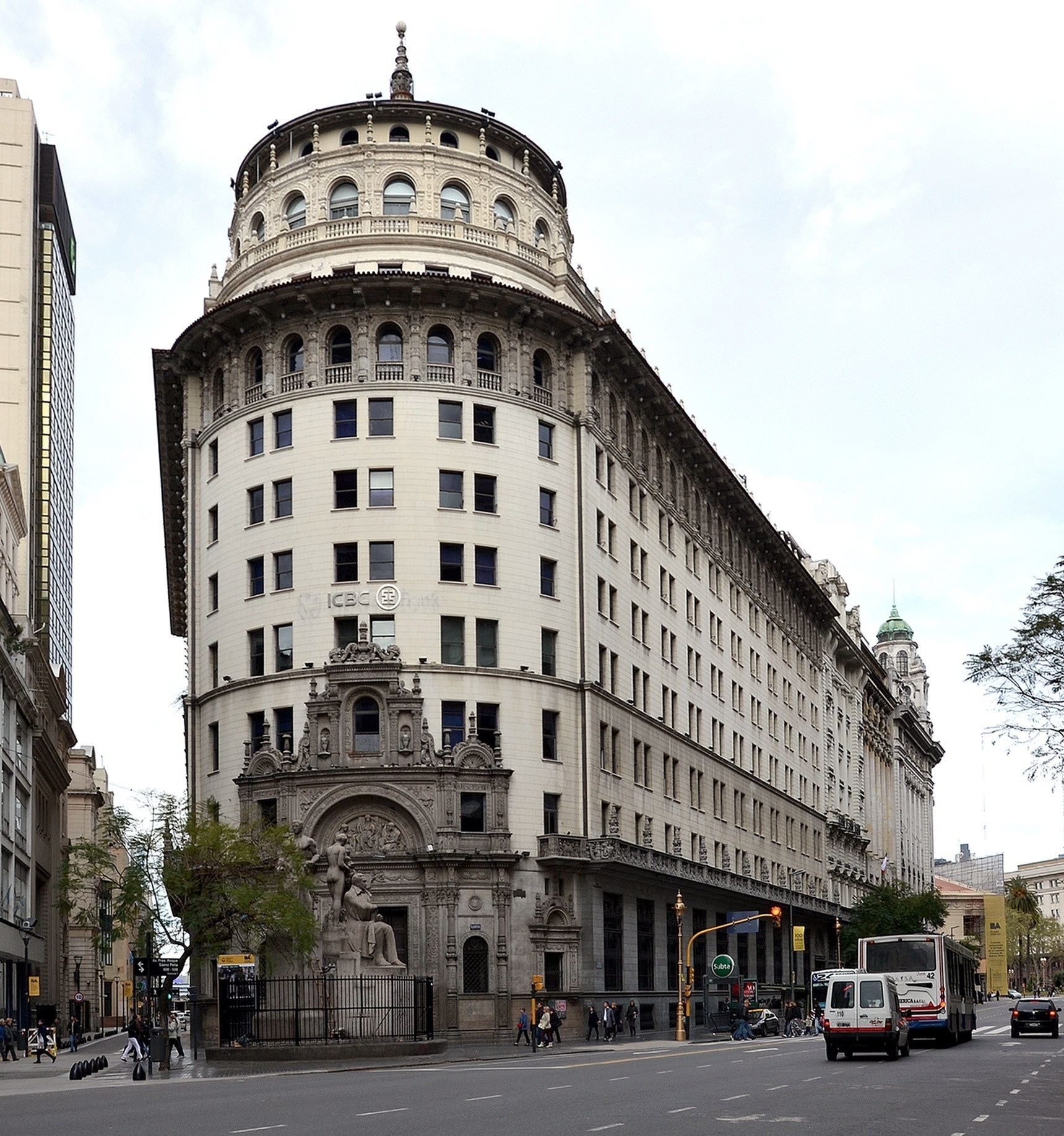
First National Bank of Boston Building in Buenos Aires, Argentina

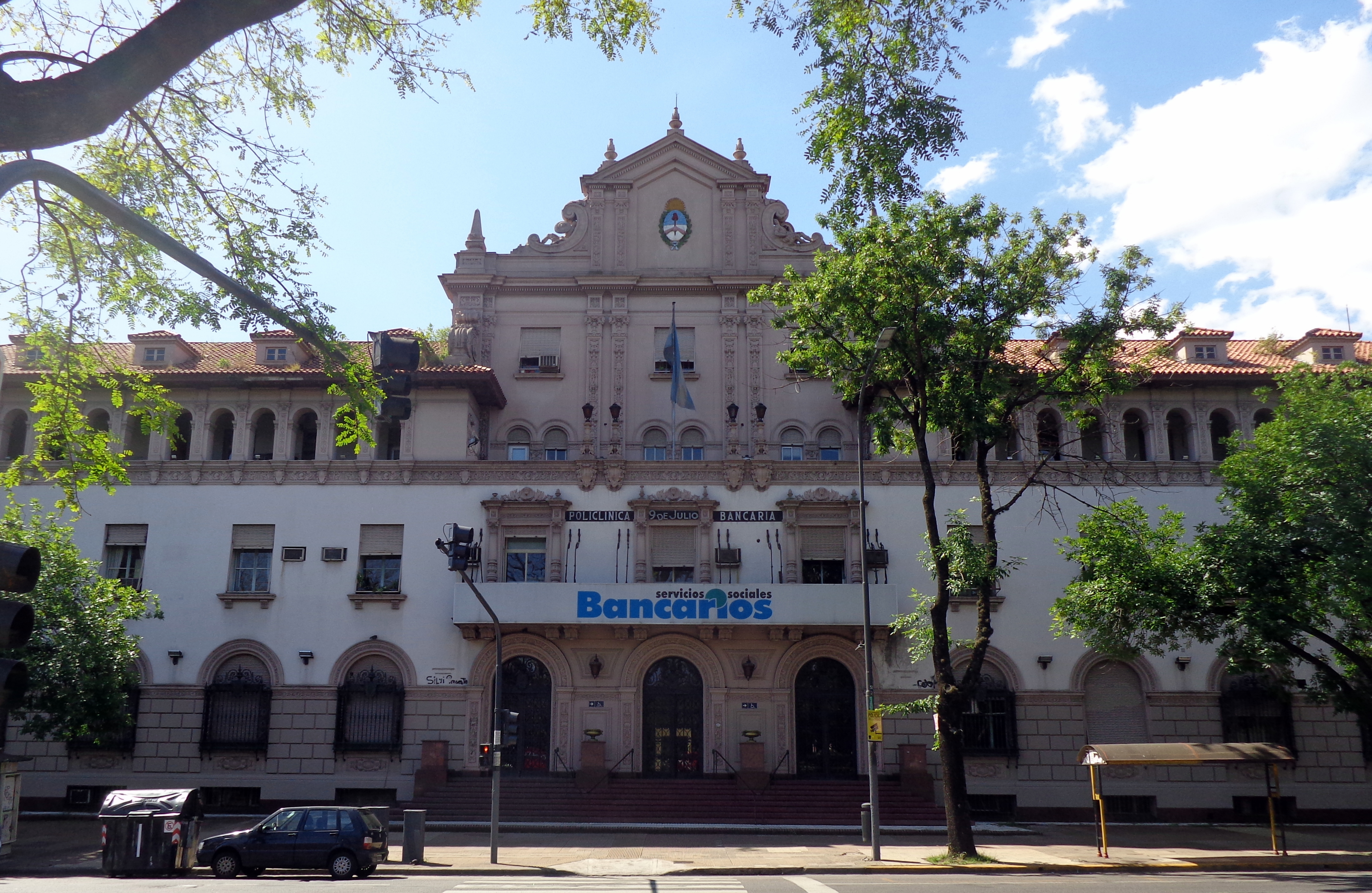
Banking Polyclinic in Buenos Aires, Argentina

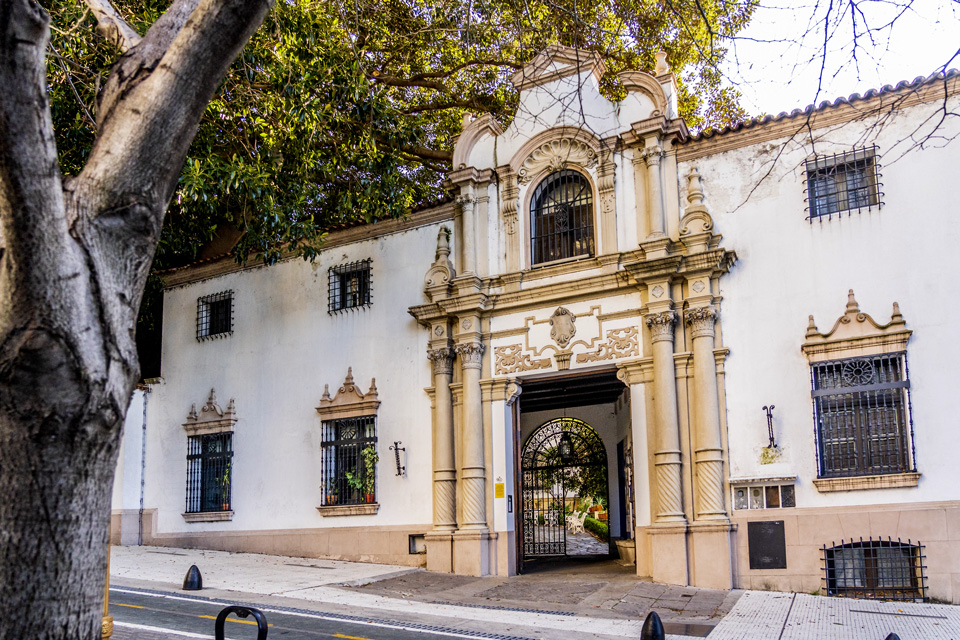
Museo de Arte Hispanoamericano Isaac Fernández Blanco in Buenos Aires, Argentina

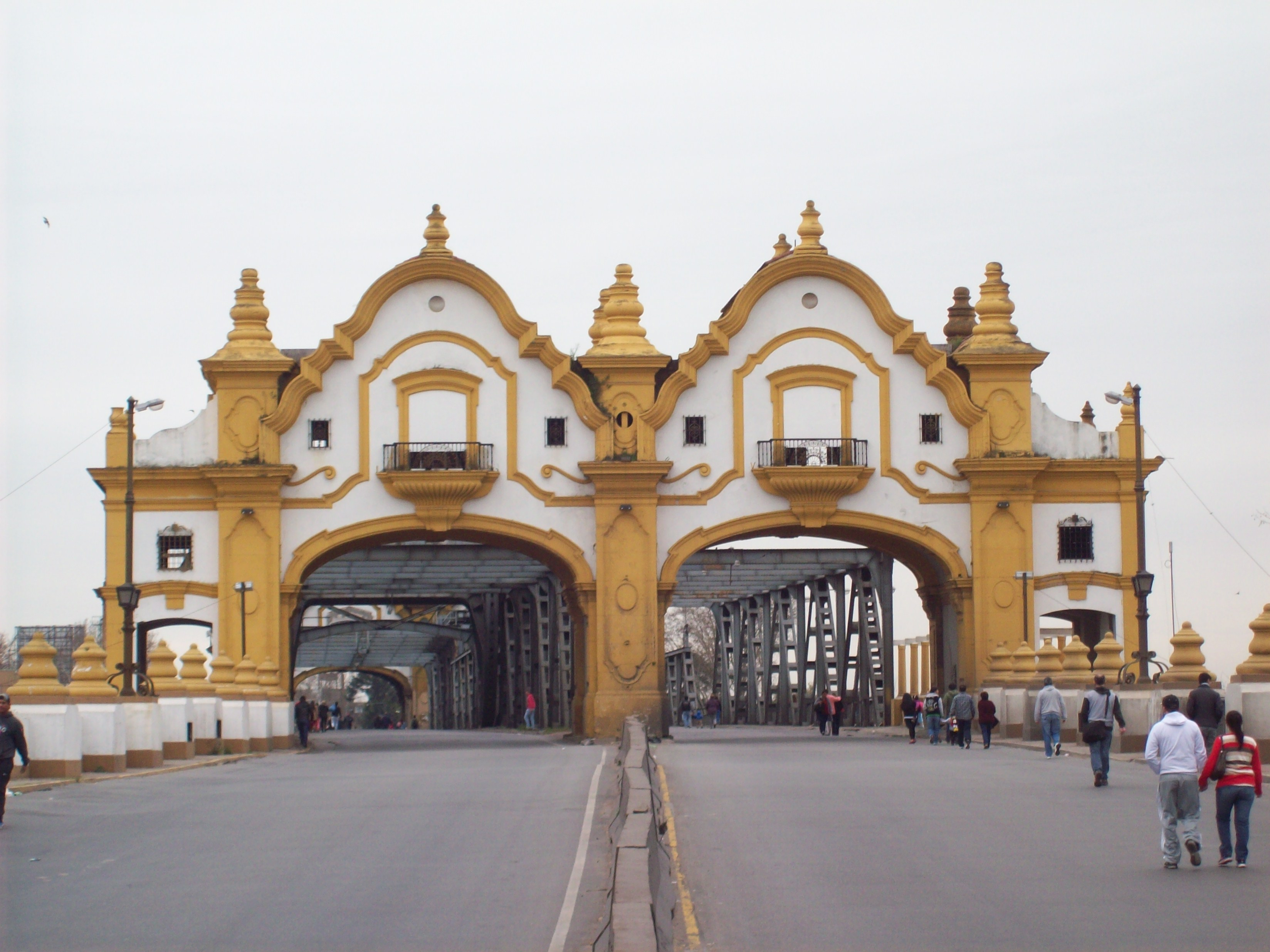
Valentín Alsina Bridge in Greater Buenos Aires, Argentina

== See also ==
- Mediterranean Revival Style architecture
- Mission Revival Style architecture
- Mar del Plata style - eclectic vernacular architecture from Argentina featuring some Spanish Colonial characteristics
- Revivalism (architecture)
- Ibero-American Exposition of 1929 - several pavilions erected for this event fall under the style
- Category: Spanish Revival architecture
- Spanish Revival architects
- Spanish Colonial Revival architects
- Spanish Colonial Revival architecture in California
