= Michael Burch =

American architect (born 1953)

Michael Bauman Burch
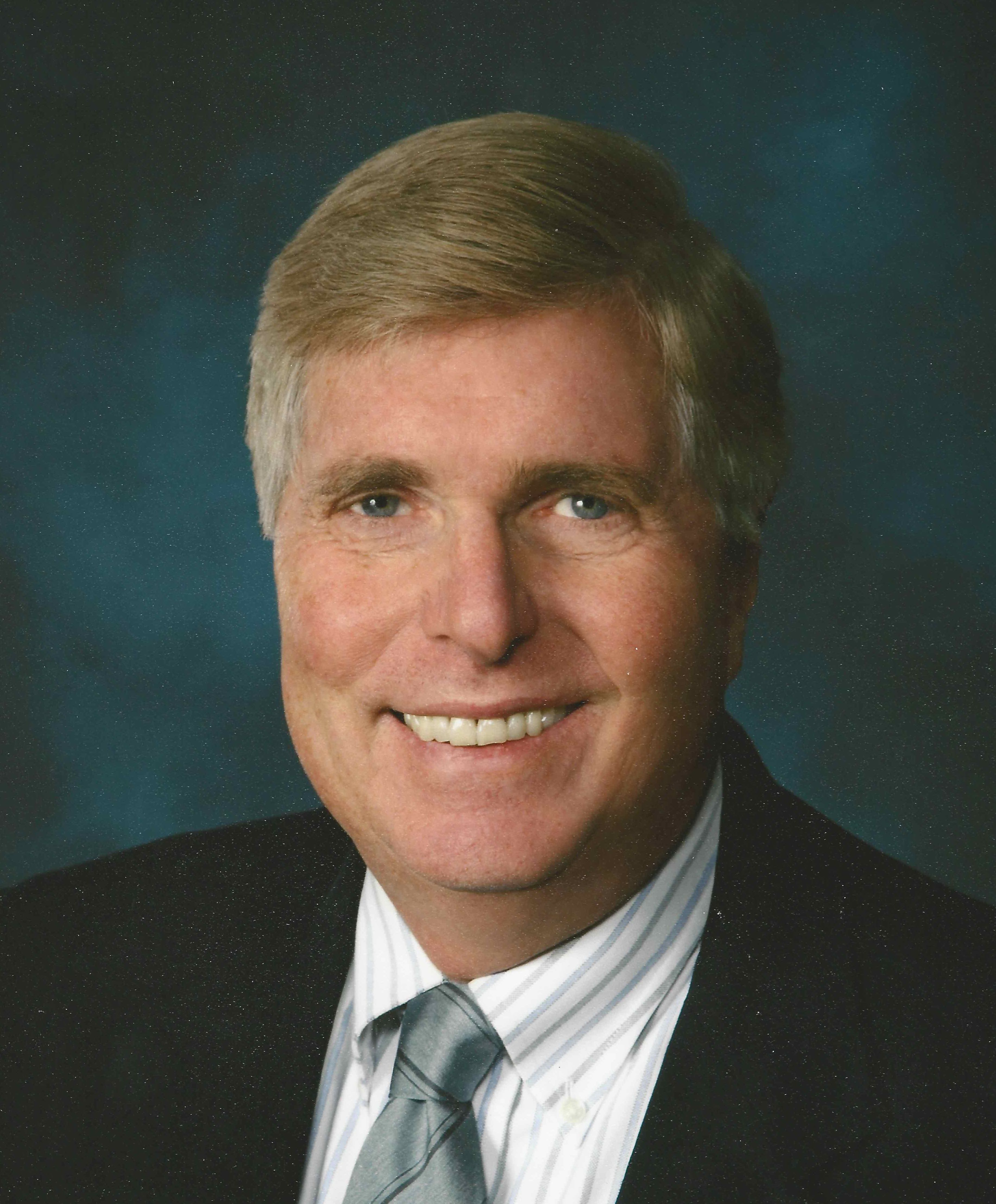
- Michael Burch
- Born: March 4, 1953 (age 73); Pasadena, California, USA
- Education: Yale University; University of California Berkeley
- Occupation: Architect
- Spouse: Diane Wilk
- Website: michaelburcharchitects.com

Michael Bauman Burch (March 4, 1953 Pasadena, California) is a Southern California-based architect. He is a Fellow of the American Institute of Architects (FAIA). A fourth generation Southern Californian, Burch was raised in Pasadena, CA, and educated at the University of California, Berkeley and the Yale School of Architecture. He has taught at the University of Southern California. Burch founded his firm, Michael Burch Architects, in 1986. He was the original co-curator of an exhibition for the Getty Institute's Pacific Standard Time on the Spanish Colonial/Mediterranean Revival style. Burch's work has appeared in 20 books on the style, including the cover of "the definitive statement on the subject". He was invited to present the work of his firm at the Venice Biennale of Architecture in 2012, 2014, 2016, 2018 and 2020, as well as at Moscow's Schusev Architecture Museum in 2020. He has been described as "the greatest living practitioner of the Spanish Colonial/Mediterranean Revival style". In addition to numerous American Institute of Architects awards, his firm has received three Palladio Awards, the sole national award for traditional architecture.

== Bibliography ==
A selection of books in which Michael Burch's work appears:

- Ranches: Home on the Range in California (2016)
- Signature Homes (2016)
- Adobe Structures of the Coachella Valley (2015)
- Dreaming Small (2013)
- The California Casa (2012)
- Classic Homes of Los Angeles (2010)
- Ranches of the American West (2009)
- Legendary Estates of Beverly Hills (2008)
- Dream Homes of Los Angeles (2008)
- California Romantica (2007)
- Experimental Architecture in Los Angeles (1992)

== Selected projects ==
- Alta Canyada, La Cañada Flintridge, CA
- French Ranch, Hidden Valley, CA
- Carolwood, Holmby Hills, CA
- Hot Springs Road, Montecito, CA,
- Las Fuentes, La Cañada Flintridge, CA
- Casa de Paz, Fresno, CA
- El Oasis, Indian Wells, CA
- Enigma Villa, Cape Town, South Africa
- Cutler Insurance, Redlands, CA
- Jonathan Martin Headquarters (demolished), Los Angeles, CA
