= Hartley Building =

- U.S. National Register of Historic Places
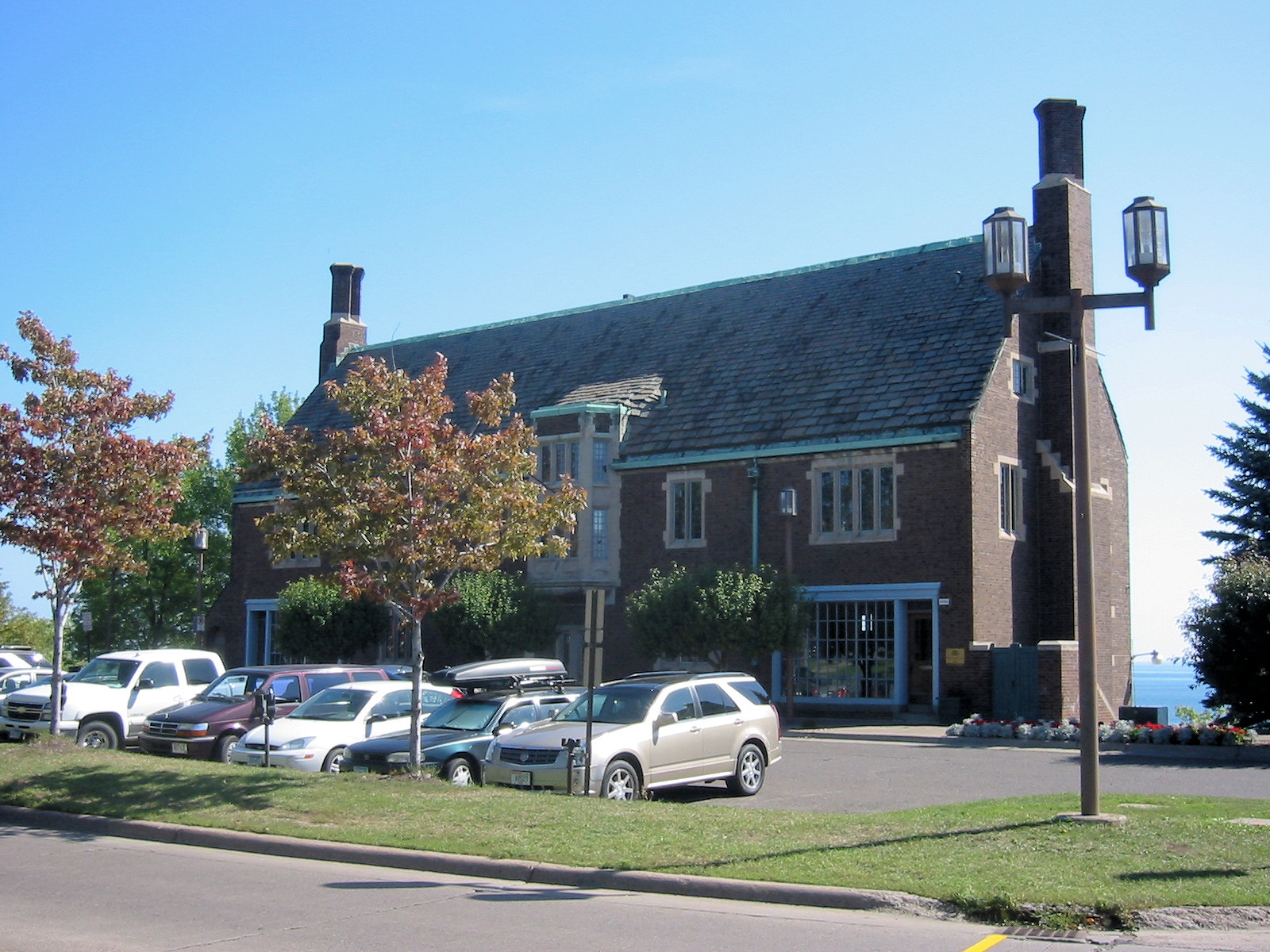
- The Hartley Building from the west

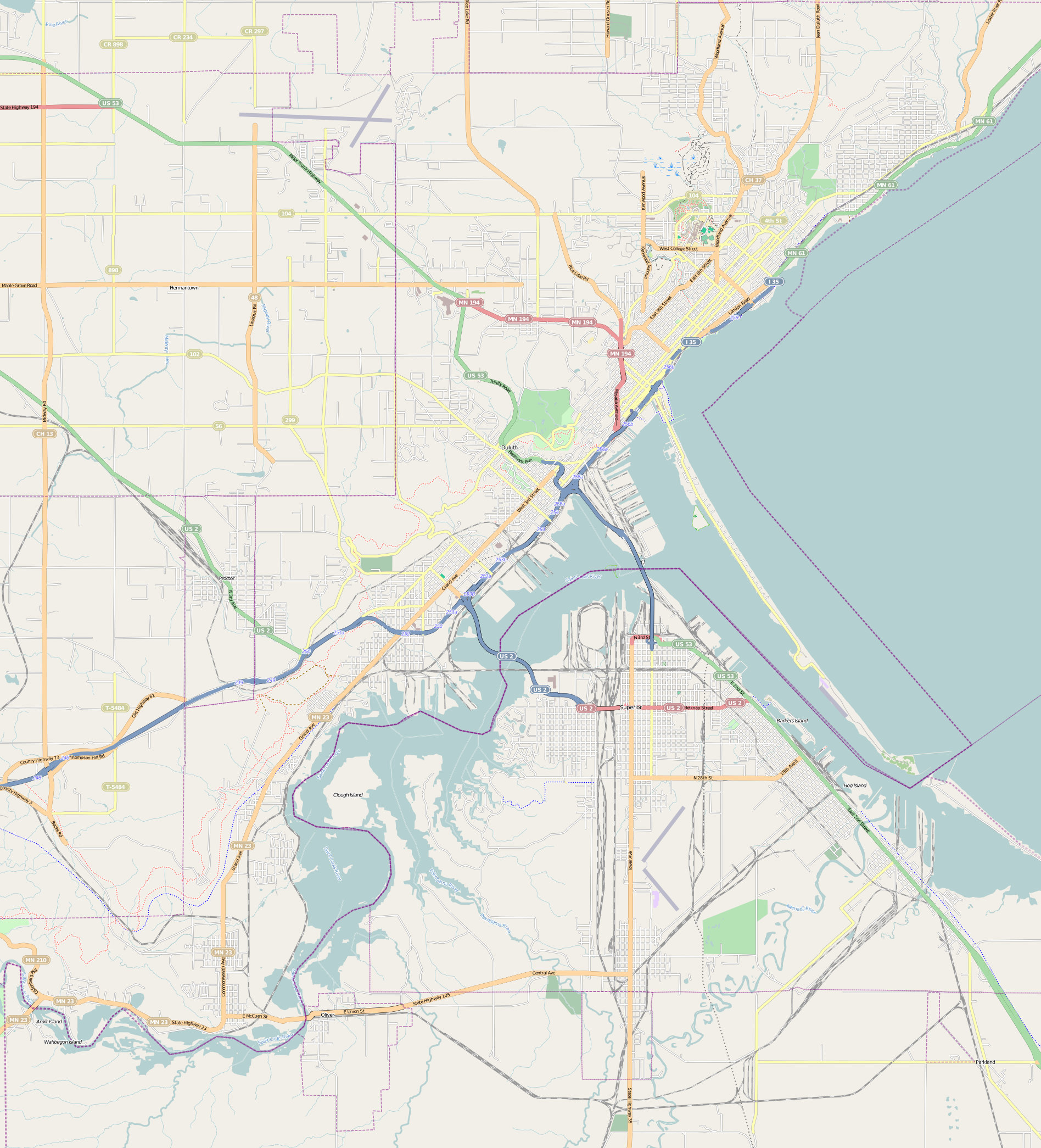
- Location within Duluth Location within Minnesota Location within the United States
- Location: 740 E. Superior Street, Duluth, Minnesota
- Coordinates: 46°47′39.3″N 92°5′18″W
- Area: Less than one acre
- Built: 1914
- Built by: John F. Fredin
- Architect: Bertram Goodhue
- Architectural style: Tudor Revival
- NRHP reference No.: 89002127
- Added to NRHP: December 15, 1989

The Hartley Building is a historic office building in Duluth, Minnesota, United States. It was designed by architect Bertram Goodhue of New York City and built in 1914. The Hartley Building was listed on the National Register of Historic Places in 1989 for having local significance in the theme of architecture. It was nominated for its exemplary Tudor Revival architecture and its status as one of four local buildings designed by Goodhue, the only nationally recognized architect to produce multiple commissions in early Duluth.

Goodhue's other Duluth works are the Kitchi Gammi Club (1912), St. Paul's Episcopal Church (1912), and the Cavour Hartley House (1915).

== See also ==
- National Register of Historic Places listings in St. Louis County, Minnesota
