= St. Mark's Episcopal Church (Mt. Kisco, New York) =

Historic church in New York, United States

- U.S. National Register of Historic Places
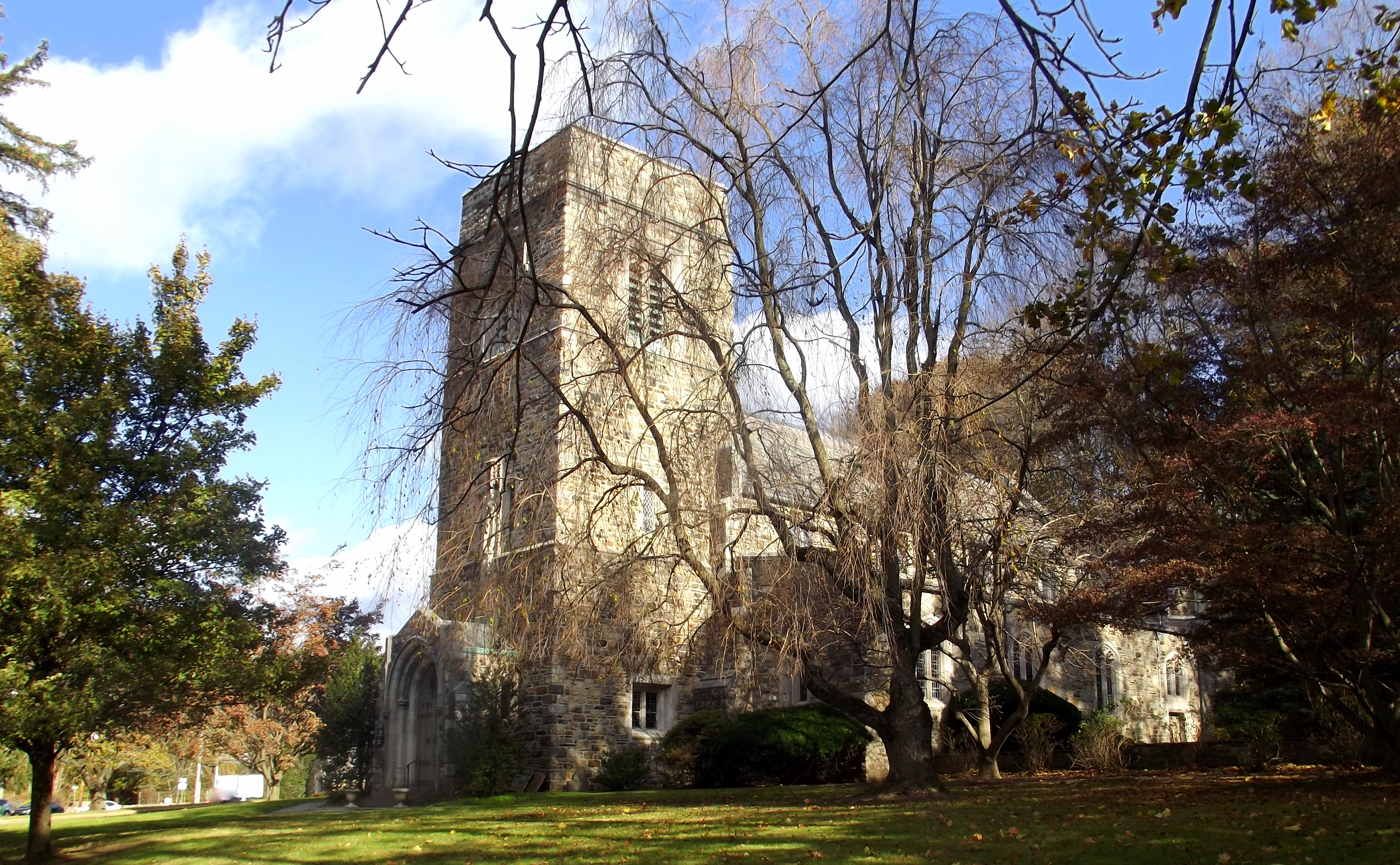
- St. Mark's Episcopal Church

- Location within New York Location within the United States
- Location: Jct. of N. Bedford Rd. and E. Main St., Mt. Kisco, New York
- Coordinates: 41°12′26″N 73°43′35″W
- Area: 2.5 acres (1.0 ha)
- Built: 1913
- Architect: Bertram Grosvenor Goodhue
- Architectural style: Late Gothic Revival
- NRHP reference No.: 91001725
- Added to NRHP: November 21, 1991

St. Mark's Episcopal Church is a historic Episcopal church at the junction of N. Bedford Rd. and E. Main Street in Mt. Kisco, Westchester County, New York. The church reported 215 members in 2015 and 86 members in 2023; no membership statistics were reported nationally in 2024 parochial reports. Plate and pledge income reported for the congregation in 2024 was $240,067. Average Sunday attendance (ASA) in 2024 was 44 persons, down from a reported 102 in 2017.

The church building was designed by architect Bertram Goodhue in 1907 and built from 1909 to 1913 in the late Gothic Revival style. The church was expanded in 1927–1928. It is a two-story building constructed of square cut local granite and schist. It has carved limestone trim and copings and a statue of St. Mark by Lee Lawrie. Its intersecting gable roof is covered by green and purple slate shingles. A tower was added in 1919–1920. Connected to the church is a contributing parish hall.

The church has an organ built by Aeolian-Skinner Organ Company. Three stained glass windows were executed by the Tiffany Studio.

The building was added to the National Register of Historic Places in 1991.

== See also ==
- National Register of Historic Places listings in northern Westchester County, New York
