= Lihiwai =

Historic house in Hawaii, United States

- U.S. National Register of Historic Places
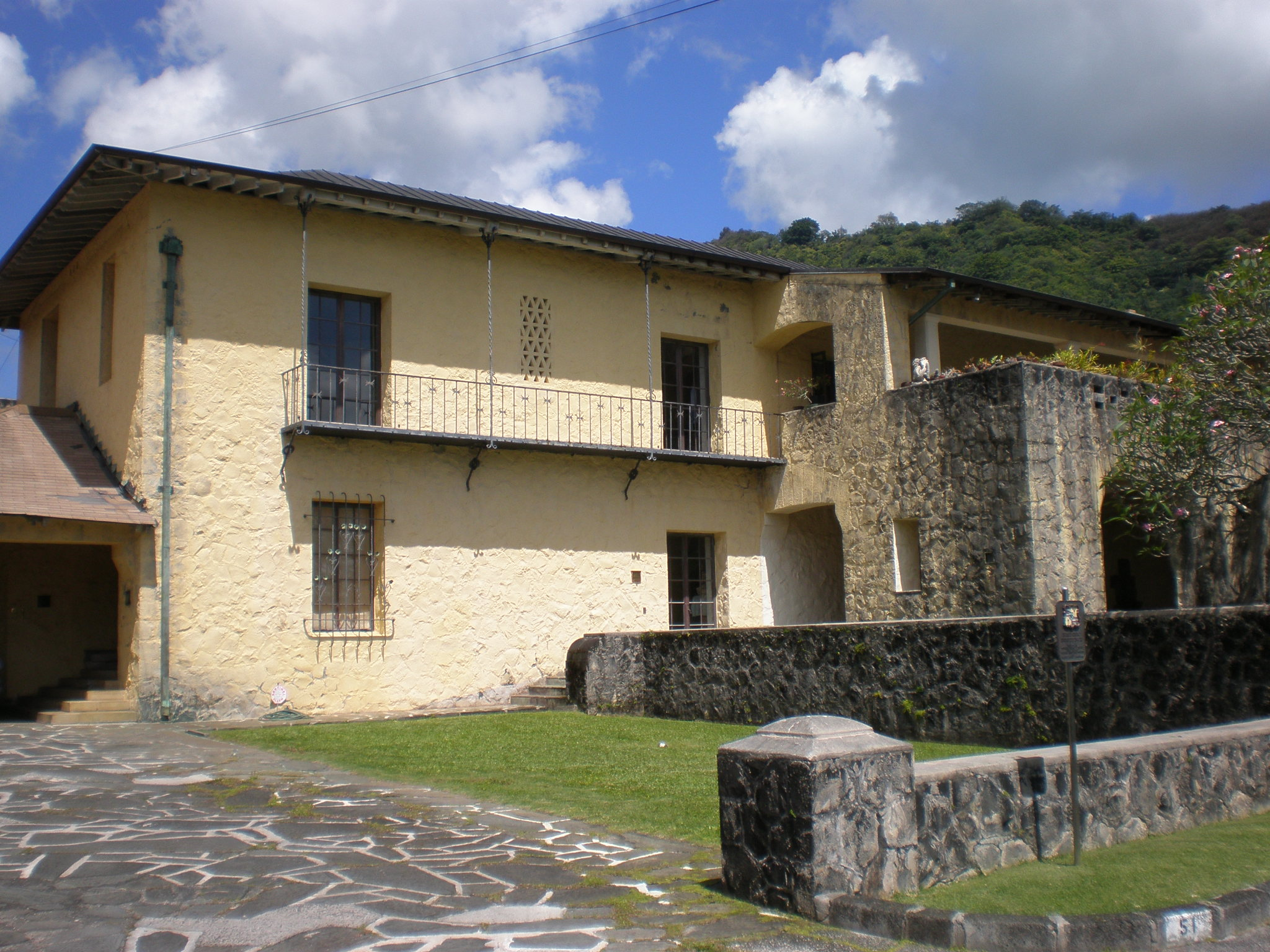
- Front corner of 51 Kepola Pl.

- Location within Hawaii
- Location: 51 Kepola Pl. (original), and 41C Kepola Pl. (increase), Honolulu, Hawaii
- Coordinates: 21°20′29″N 157°49′54″W
- Built: 1927-29
- Architect: Hardie Phillip, Bertram Goodhue
- Architectural style: Spanish Mission Revival (original); Mediterranean Revival (increase)
- NRHP reference No.: 82002501 (original) and 87000793 (increase)
- Added to NRHP: July 26, 1982 (original); June 05, 1987 (increase)

Lihiwai was the residence of Territorial Governor George R. Carter in Honolulu, Hawaii. It was designed by the architects Bertram Grosvenor Goodhue and Hardie Phillip, built in 1927–29, listed on the National Register of Historic Places in 1982, and its boundaries increased in 1987. Goodhue came to Honolulu from New York City to design not just this home, but also the Honolulu Museum of Art on the site of the former home of Anna Rice Cooke. The buildings are in the Mission Revival and Mediterranean Revival styles so popular in the Western states during the 1920s.

Governor Carter's wife, Eastman Kodak heiress Helen Strong Carter, appears to have had some influence on the design, because the ladies' powder room is much larger than the men's smoking room. The house's 40 rooms include servants' quarters, which can be distinguished by their lower, 9-foot (2.7 m) ceilings, compared with 11-foot (3.4 m) ceilings elsewhere, as well as small rooms for arranging flowers and storing luggage. The basement and upper floors are connected by elevator, grand staircase, and servants' staircase. The 45 servants included 10 who worked inside the house and 35 who tended the 10-acre (40,000 m^{2}) grounds.

The Carters occupied the house in 1930, but the governor died in 1933, and Mrs. Carter died in 1946. During World War II, she left the house in the care of relatives who opened it to military personnel for R&R. The house was sold after she died, and most of the lower grounds were subdivided into house lots.

== Gallery ==
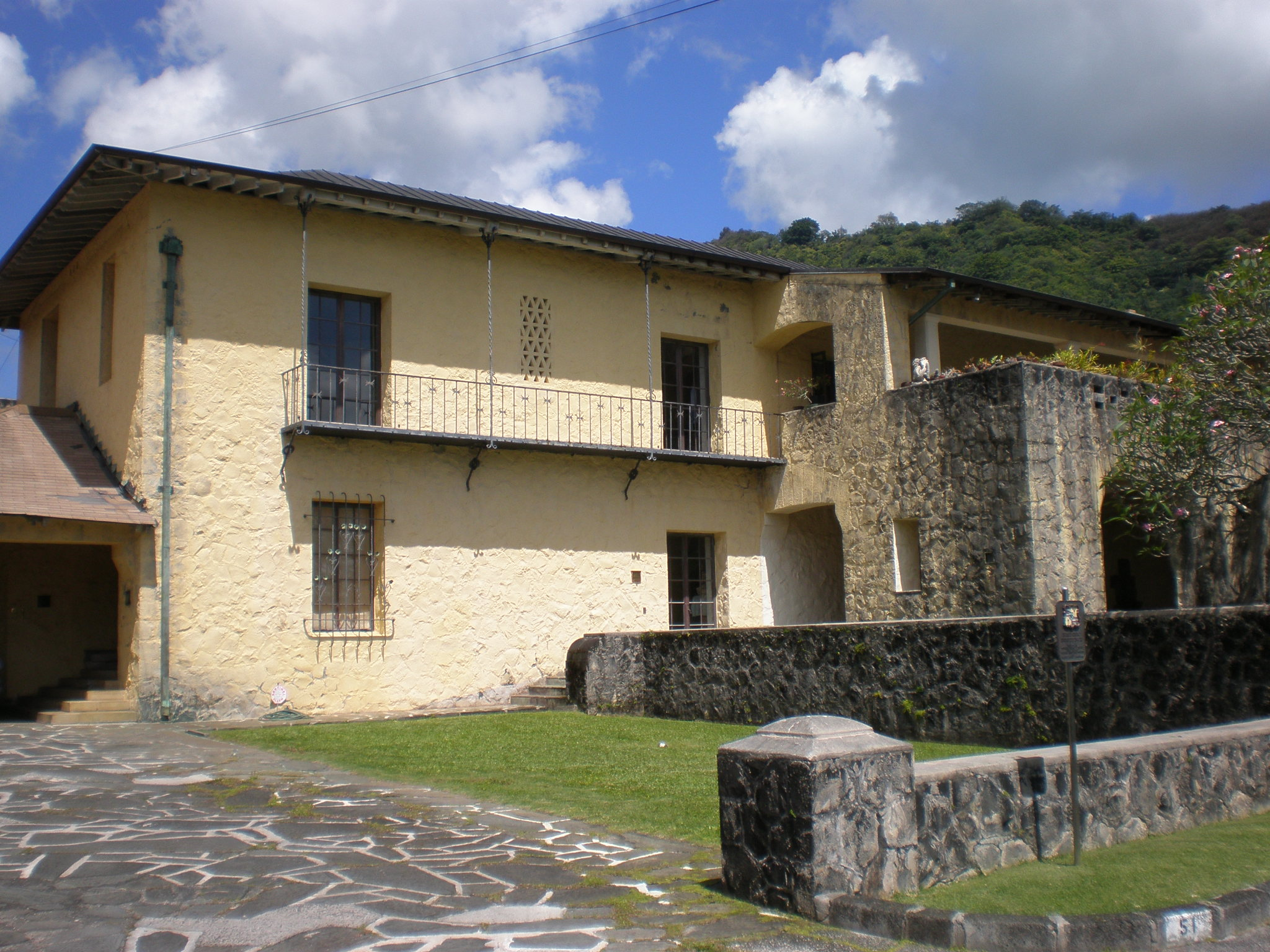
Front corner

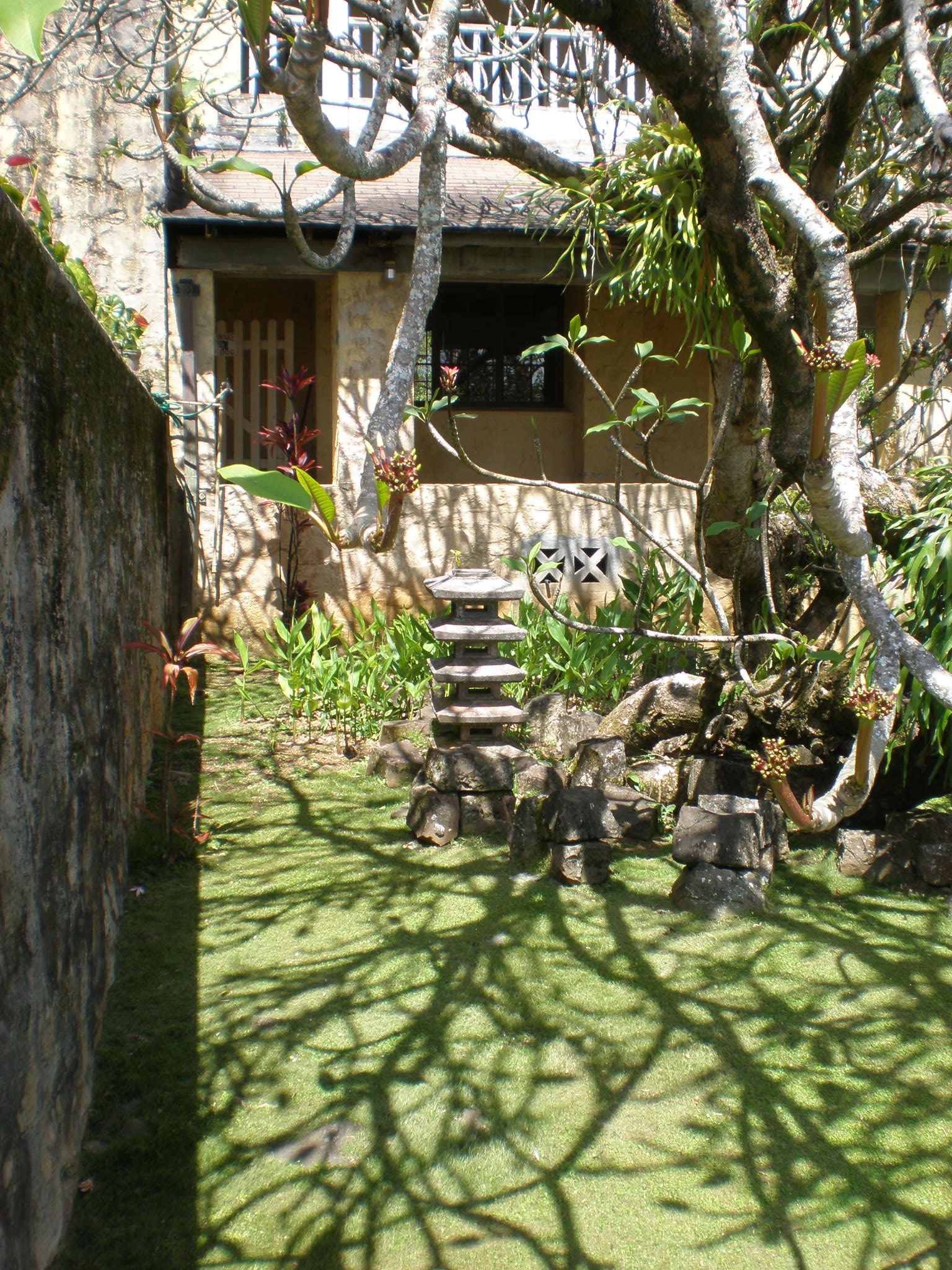
Front garden

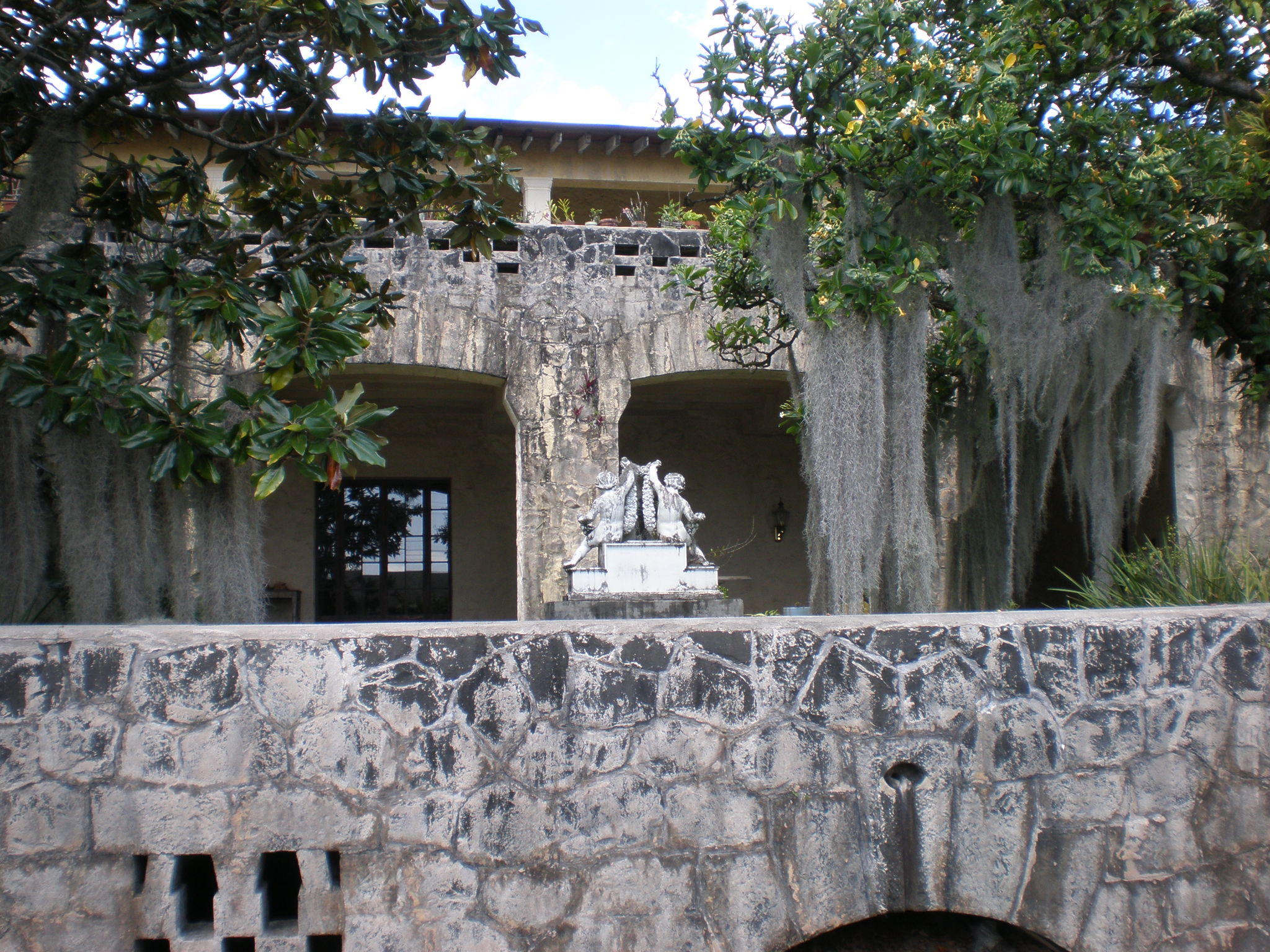
Front wall & balcony

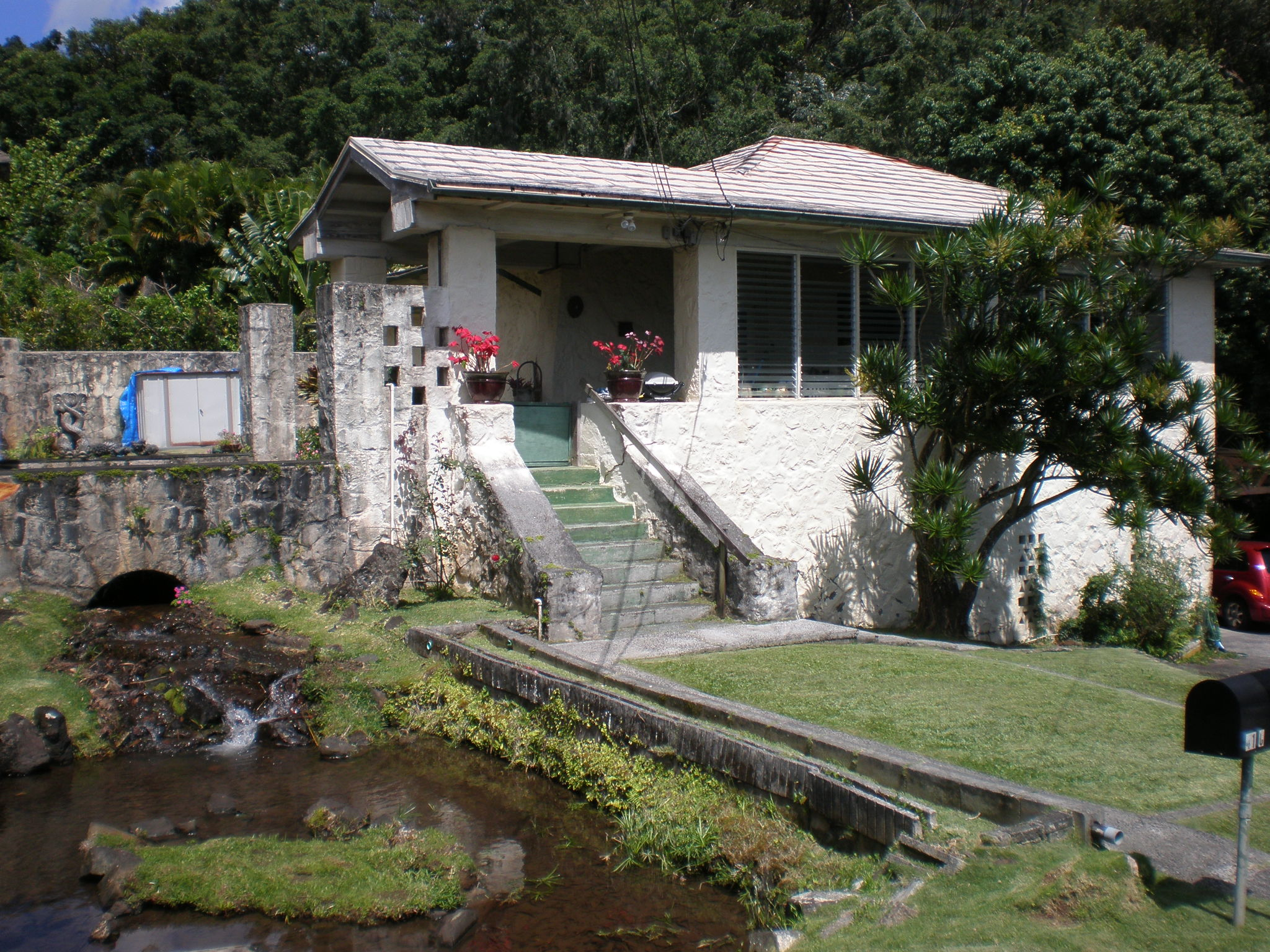
Guesthouse

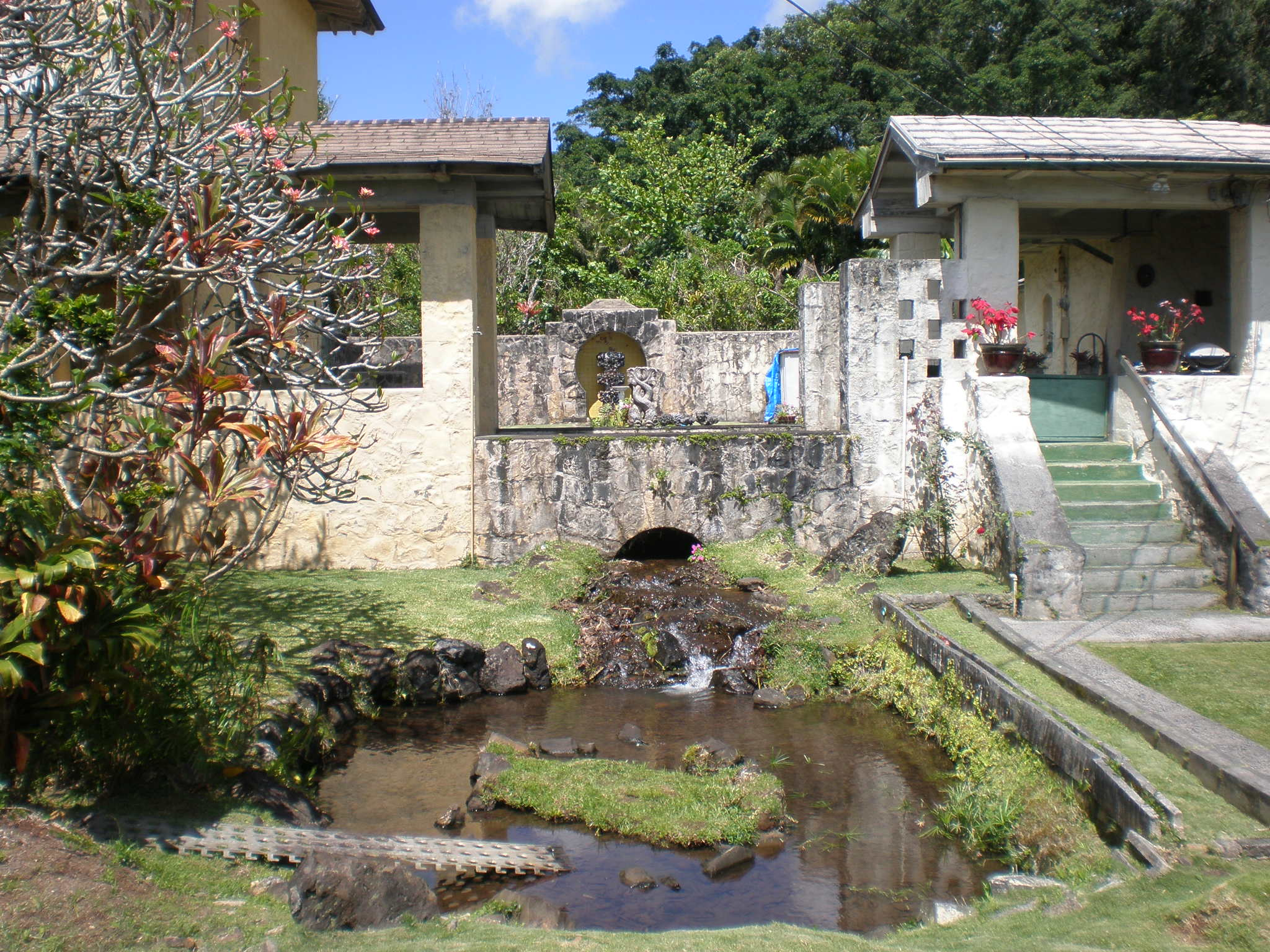
Rear fountain & pond

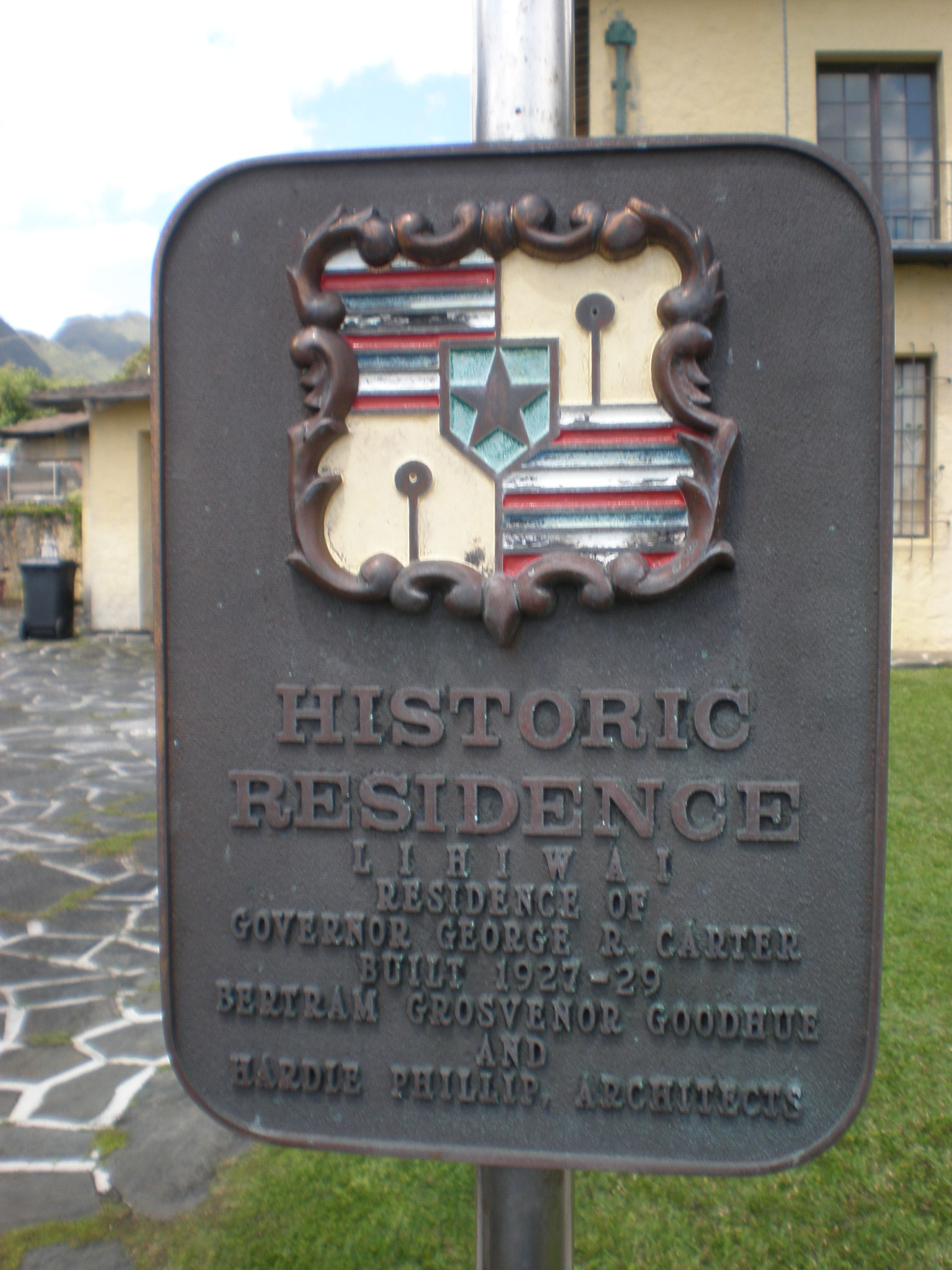
Historic Residence marker
