= Sergey Grishin (businessman) =

Businessperson (1966–2023)

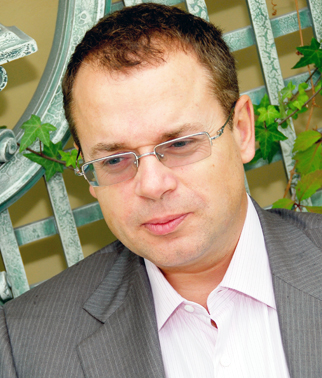
- Born: 21 June 1966
- Died: 6 March 2023 (aged 56); Moscow, Russia
- Education: Moscow Institute of Electronics Technics
- Occupations: Developer, engineer, and President and Chairman of RosEvro Group

Sergey Grishin (Russian: Сергей Гришин; 21 June 1966 – 6 March 2023) was a Russian-American billionaire, engineer and developer, who was the president and chairman of RosEvro Group. Grishin co-owned the Rosevrobank (aka The Laundromat) and had claimed that he 'practically brought the Russian banking system to collapse' in the 1990s after the Soviet Union collapsed by committing 'the largest bank fraud scheme ever', orchestrating an estimated $60 billion heist from the Russian Central Bank.

== Biography ==
After receiving his degree in Physics, Grishin began his career as an entrepreneur in 1987 by baking cookies and hot dogs in his Moscow apartment and selling them. This was the start of a small business in the retail food industry. Grishin was the chairman of Rosevrobank when it was at the centre of the Russian Laundromat scandal. He later became founding partner of the RosEvro Group, a large consortium of businesses which include National Logistic Company (NLK), the largest Russian logistic company, which was sold to a well known international logistics company in 2008.

In 2011, Grishin recruited Dovi Frances to manage investments at SG, a financial advisory company he controlled.

In 2019 he moved from Santa Barbara to Los Angeles.

Grishin acquired two mansions in Montecito: In 2008 the mansion named ″El Fureidis″, which prominently featured in the 1983 film "Scarface", and in 2009 the seven-acre site ″Chateau of Riven Rock″ for $25.3 million. Grishin sold his stake in Rosevrobank in November 2018.

In June 2020 Grishin sold his mansion ″Chateau of Riven Rock″ to Prince Harry and his wife Meghan Markle for $14.65 million.

Grishin died in Moscow on 6 March 2023, at the age of 56.

He owned 421 Media, a California-based social media company focused on producing viral Instagram content.
