= Bertram Goodhue =

American architect (1869–1924)

Bertram Grosvenor Goodhue
- Born: April 28, 1869; Pomfret, Connecticut, U.S.
- Died: April 23, 1924 (aged 54); New York City, U.S.
- Education: New Haven Collegiate and Commercial Institute
- Occupation: Architect
- Parent(s): Charles Wells Goodhue, Helen Grosvenor (Eldredge) Goodhue
- Practice: Cram, Wentworth & Goodhue; Cram, Goodhue & Ferguson

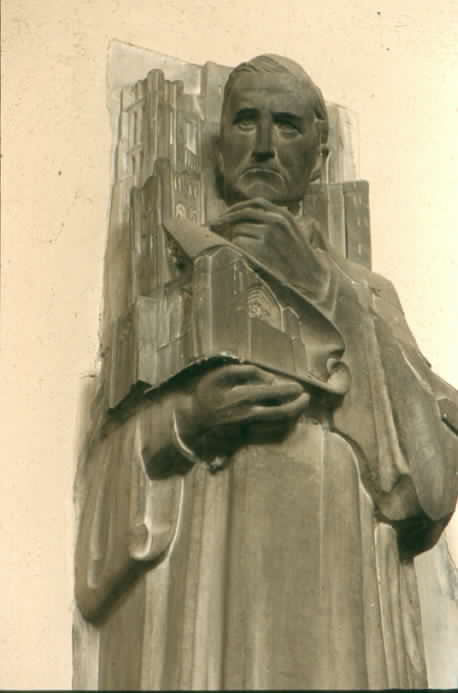
Goodhue by Lee Lawrie, holding the Rockefeller Chapel, Chicago, Illinois

Bertram Grosvenor Goodhue (April 28, 1869 – April 23, 1924) was an American architect celebrated for his work in Gothic Revival and Spanish Colonial Revival design. He also designed notable typefaces, including Cheltenham and Merrymount for the Merrymount Press. Later in life, Goodhue freed his architectural style with works like El Fureidis in Montecito, California, one of three estates he designed.

== Early career ==
Goodhue was born in Pomfret, Connecticut, to Charles Wells Goodhue and his second wife, Helen Grosvenor (Eldredge) Goodhue. Due to financial constraints, he was educated at home by his mother until, at age 11 years, he was sent to Russell's Collegiate and Commercial Institute. Finances prevented him from attending university. In lieu of formal training, in 1884 he moved to Manhattan, New York City, to apprentice at the architectural firm of Renwick, Aspinwall & Russell (one of its principals, James Renwick Jr., was the architect of Grace Church and St. Patrick's Cathedral, both in New York City). Goodhue's apprenticeship ended in 1891 when he won a design competition for St. Matthew's in Dallas.

== Cram and Goodhue ==
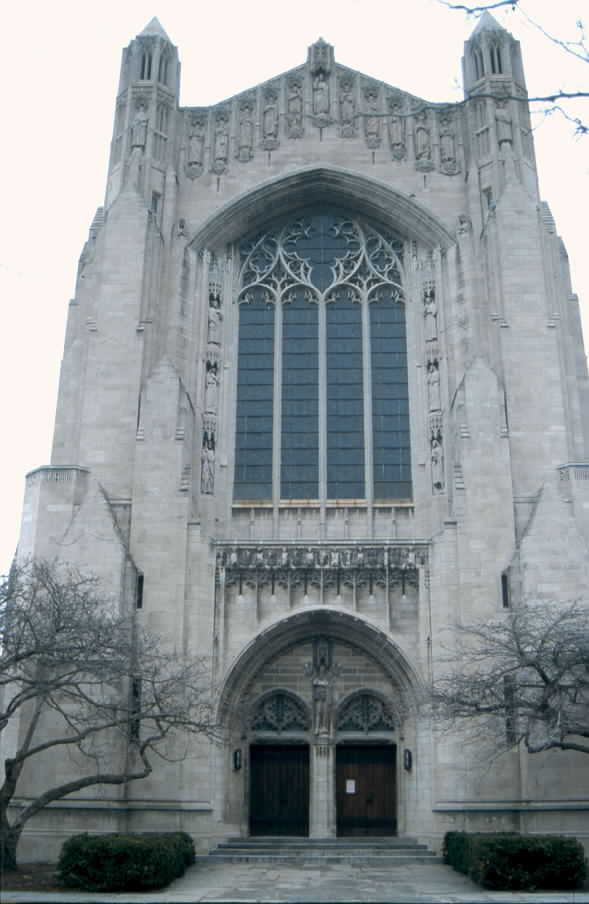
Rockefeller Chapel, University of Chicago

After completing his apprenticeship, Goodhue moved to Boston, Massachusetts, where he was befriended by a group of young, artistic intellectuals involved in the founding of the Society of Arts and Crafts – Boston in 1897. This circle included Charles Eliot Norton of Harvard University and Ernest Fenollosa of the Boston Museum of Fine Arts. It was also through this group that Goodhue met Ralph Adams Cram, who would be his business partner for almost 25 years. Cram and Goodhue were members of several societies, including the "Pewter Mugs" and the "Visionists". In 1892–1893 they published a quarterly art magazine called The Knight Errant. The multitalented Goodhue was also a student of book design and type design. In 1896, he created the Cheltenham typeface for use by a New York printer, Cheltenham Press. This typeface came to be used as the headline type for The New York Times.

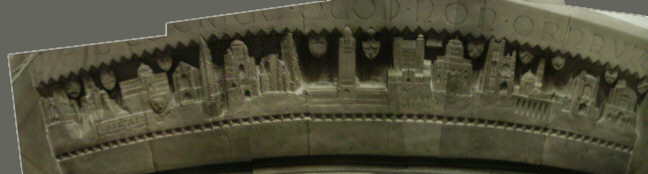
Frieze above Goodhue's tomb, Church of the Intercession, New York City

In 1891, Cram and Goodhue formed the architectural firm of Cram, Wentworth & Goodhue, renamed Cram, Goodhue & Ferguson in 1898. The firm was a leader in Neo-Gothic architecture, with significant commissions from ecclesiastical, academic, and institutional clients. The Gothic Revival Saint Thomas Church was designed by them and completed in 1913 on Manhattan's Fifth Avenue in New York City. In 1904, Goodhue built a townhouse at 106 East 74th Street, pushing the front to the building line and redesigning it in a mix of Gothic and Tudor styles. In 1915, Goodhue accepted membership to what is known now as the American Academy of Arts and Letters. In 1917, Goodhue was elected into the National Academy of Design as an Associate member, and became a full Academician in 1923.

== Independent practice ==
=== Early projects ===
When Goodhue left to begin his own practice in 1914, Cram had already created his dreamed-of Gothic Revival commission at the Cathedral of St. John the Divine in New York City, and continued to work in the Gothic style mode for the rest of his career.

Goodhue departed into a series of radically different stylistic experiments over his independent career. His first was the Byzantine Revival style for St. Bartholomew's Episcopal Church on New York City's Park Avenue, built on a new platform just above the Grand Central Terminal railyards.

=== Spanish Colonial Revival projects ===
In California, in 1915, Bertram Goodhue re-interpreted masterful Spanish Baroque and Spanish Colonial architecture complete with the latter's traditional Churrigueresque detailing into what became known as the Spanish Colonial Revival Style of architecture. This was for the significant commission of the El Prado Quadrangle's layout and buildings at the major 1915 Panama–California Exposition, located in San Diego's Balboa Park. He was the lead architect, taking over from Irving Gill, with Carleton Winslow Sr. and Lloyd Wright assisting. The Panama–California Exposition's style was seen by many and widely published, becoming extremely influential in California and the Southern and Southwestern United States. It led to California's assimilation of Spanish Colonial Revival Style architecture as its dominant historical regional style, which continues to this day. The singular style for the rebuilding of Santa Barbara after its 1925 destruction by a major earthquake was drawn from the local Mission Revival and Goodhue's Panama–California Exposition Spanish Colonial Revival style trends. Examples of influential private Californian commissions, both extant registered landmarks now, are his 1906 J. Waldron Gillespie Estate, El Fureidis; and 1915 Dater – Wright Ludington Estate, Dias Felices — Val Verde in Montecito. Goodhue and Gillespie had done a six-month research and acquisitions tour together through Egypt, Persia, and the Arabian Peninsula before collaborating on the classic Persian gardens layout and Roman and Spanish Colonial Revival residence at El Fureidis. Goodhue's Spanish Colonial Revival style work went on to dominate the Hawaiian architecture of public buildings and estate residences during the 1920s building boom in the Territory of Hawaii.

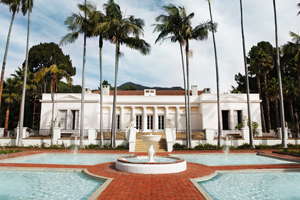
El Fureidis Estate in Montecito, California.

=== Later projects ===
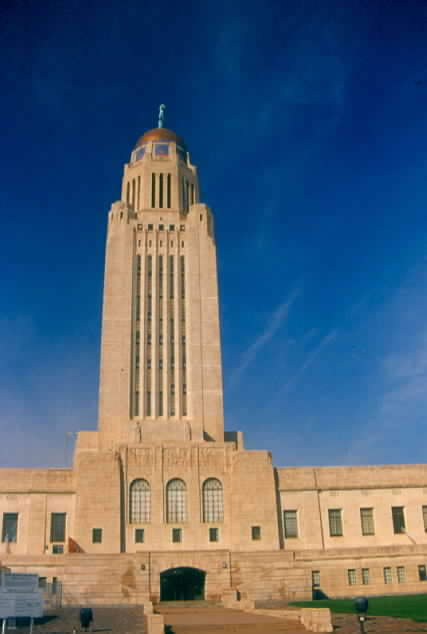
State Capitol, Lincoln, Nebraska

Later Goodhue's architectural creations became freed of architectural detail and more Romanesque in form, although he remained dedicated to the integration of sculpture, mosaic work, and color in his surface architectural details. Towards the end of his career, he arrived at a highly personal style, a synthesis of simplified form and a generalized archaic quality, and those innovations paved the way for others to transition to modern architectural idioms. This style is seen in his last major projects: the 1926 Mediterranean revival and Egyptian revival Los Angeles Public Library; the Nebraska State Capitol; and in his 1922 entry for the Chicago Tribune Tower competition.

== Influence ==
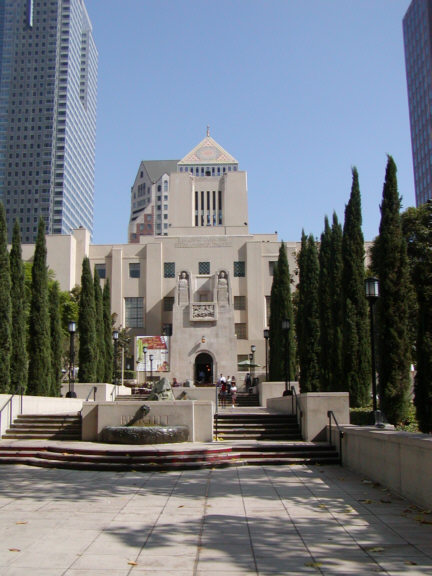
Los Angeles Central Library

Goodhue died in 1924 in New York City. He was interred within a wall vault in the north (left-hand) transept of his Church of the Intercession, at his request in the building he considered his finest. Architectural sculptor Lee Lawrie created a Gothic styled tomb for him there, featuring Goodhue recumbent, crowned by a carved halo of some of his buildings. He received the AIA Gold Medal in 1925.

=== Collaboration ===
Throughout his career, Goodhue relied on frequent collaborations with several significant artists and artisans. These included architectural sculptor Lee Lawrie, and mosaicist and muralist Hildreth Meiere. Their work is central to the aesthetic power and social messages implicit in Goodhue's best work. Lee Lawrie worked with Cram and Goodhue on: the Chapel at West Point, the Church of St. Vincent Ferrer, St. Bartholomew's, and the reredos at the Church of St. Thomas. Lawrie worked after 1914 with Goodhue's independent practice on: the Los Angeles Public Library, the Nebraska State Capitol, the Rockefeller Chapel at the University of Chicago, the National Academy of Sciences Building in Washington, D.C., and the Christ Church Cranbrook completed after Goodhue's death at the Cranbrook Schools in Bloomfield Hills, Michigan. Edward Ardolino was a frequent collaborating sculptor.

After Goodhue's unexpected death in 1924, many of his designs and projects were brought to completion by architect Carleton Winslow Sr. in California, the successor firm of Mayers Murray & Phillip in New York, and other former associates. Goodhue's offices had employed before they established their own independent practices and reputations, designers and architects such as Raymond Hood, Carleton Winslow Sr., Clarence Stein, and Wallace Harrison. Thematic consultant Hartley Burr Alexander, Lee Lawrie, and Hildreth Meiere reassembled in the 1930s for the Rockefeller Center project collaboration with Raymond Hood.

=== Legacy ===
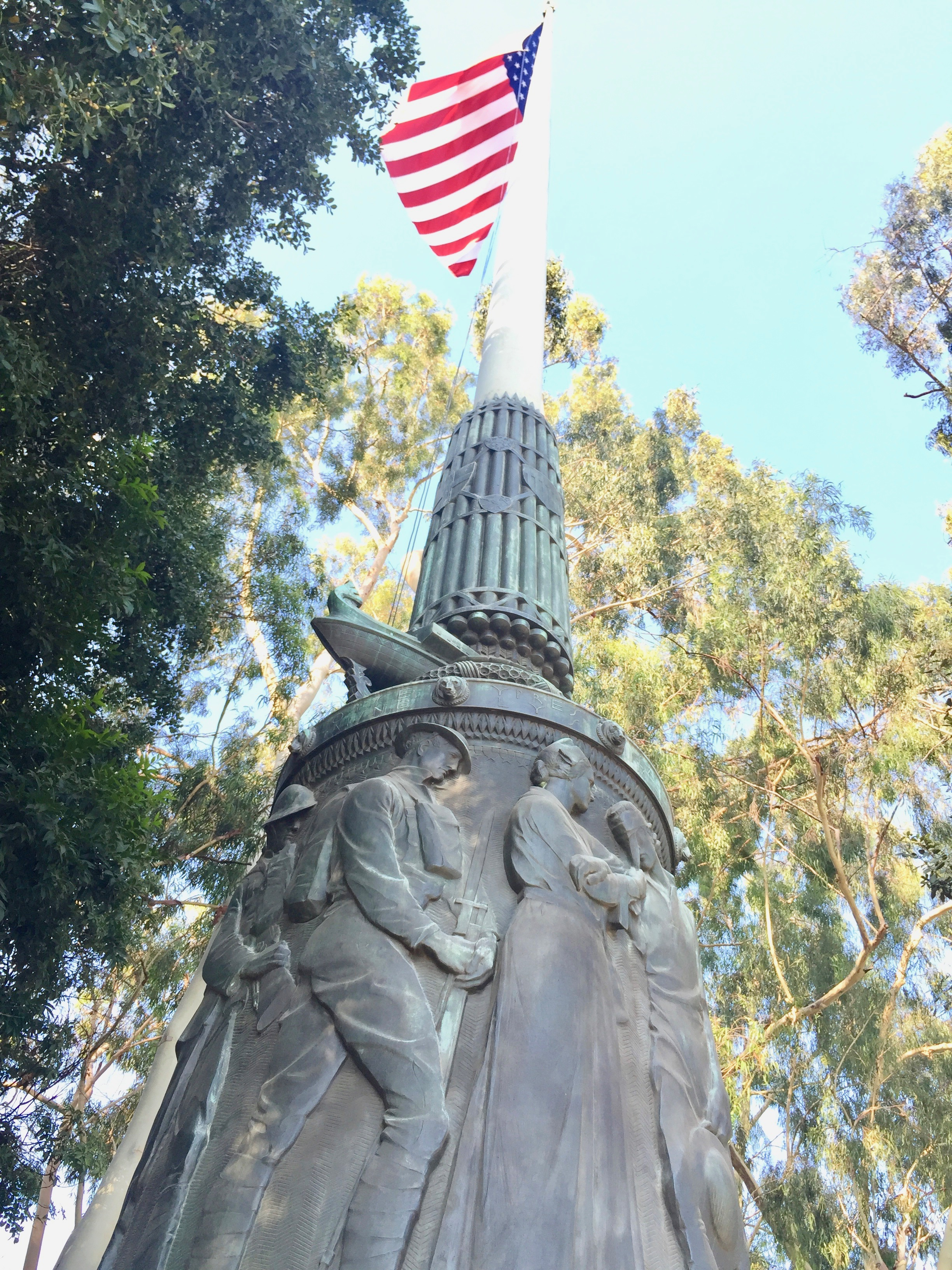
Flagpole designed by Bertram Goodhue in memory of Pasadena, California residents' lives lost in WWI. Monument dedicated in 1927.

In a dissertation on American regional architecture in California and Hawaii, Goodhue is credited with creating a distinctive interpretation of Spanish Colonial architecture into the Spanish Colonial Revival Style as a dominant Californian regional vernacular. He also directly influenced the dominance of the Spanish Colonial Revival style in major public and private architecture of 1920s Hawaii.

Along with Paul Cret and others, Goodhue is sometimes credited with being part of popularizing the art deco style in America, as in his design for the Nebraska State Capitol building, by which some may retroactively classify him as an early American Modernist. However, his dedication to the integration of art and architecture was contrary to the spirit of Modernism design, and at least partly accounts for the academic and critical neglect of his work.

A significant archive of Goodhue's correspondence, architectural drawings, and professional papers is held by the Avery Architectural and Fine Arts Library at Columbia University in New York City.

James Perry Wilson, an architect and painter responsible for many of the Natural History dioramas at the American Museum of Natural History, was employed by Bertram Goodhue Associates before transitioning to museum work.

== Projects ==
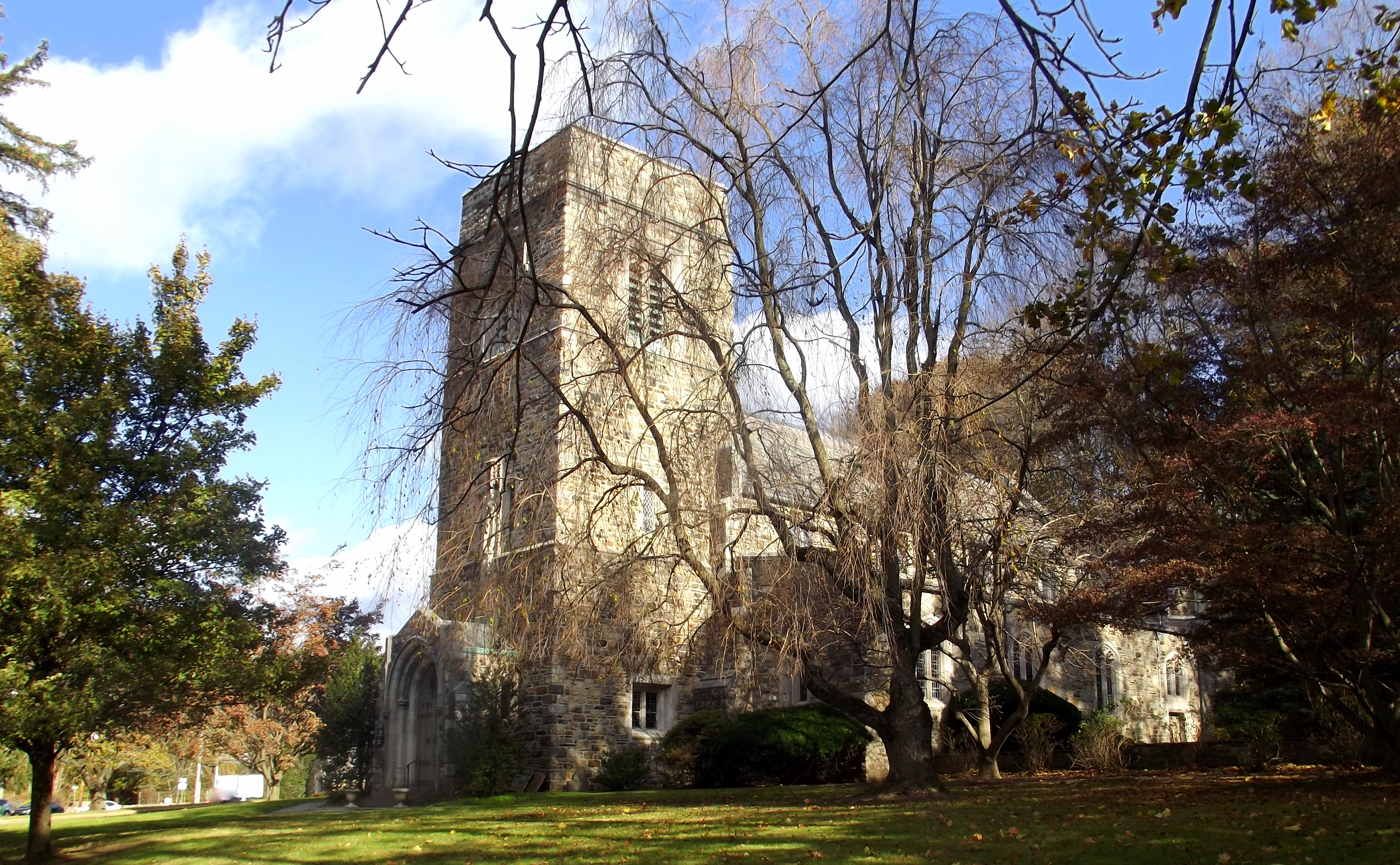
Saint Mark's Episcopal Church

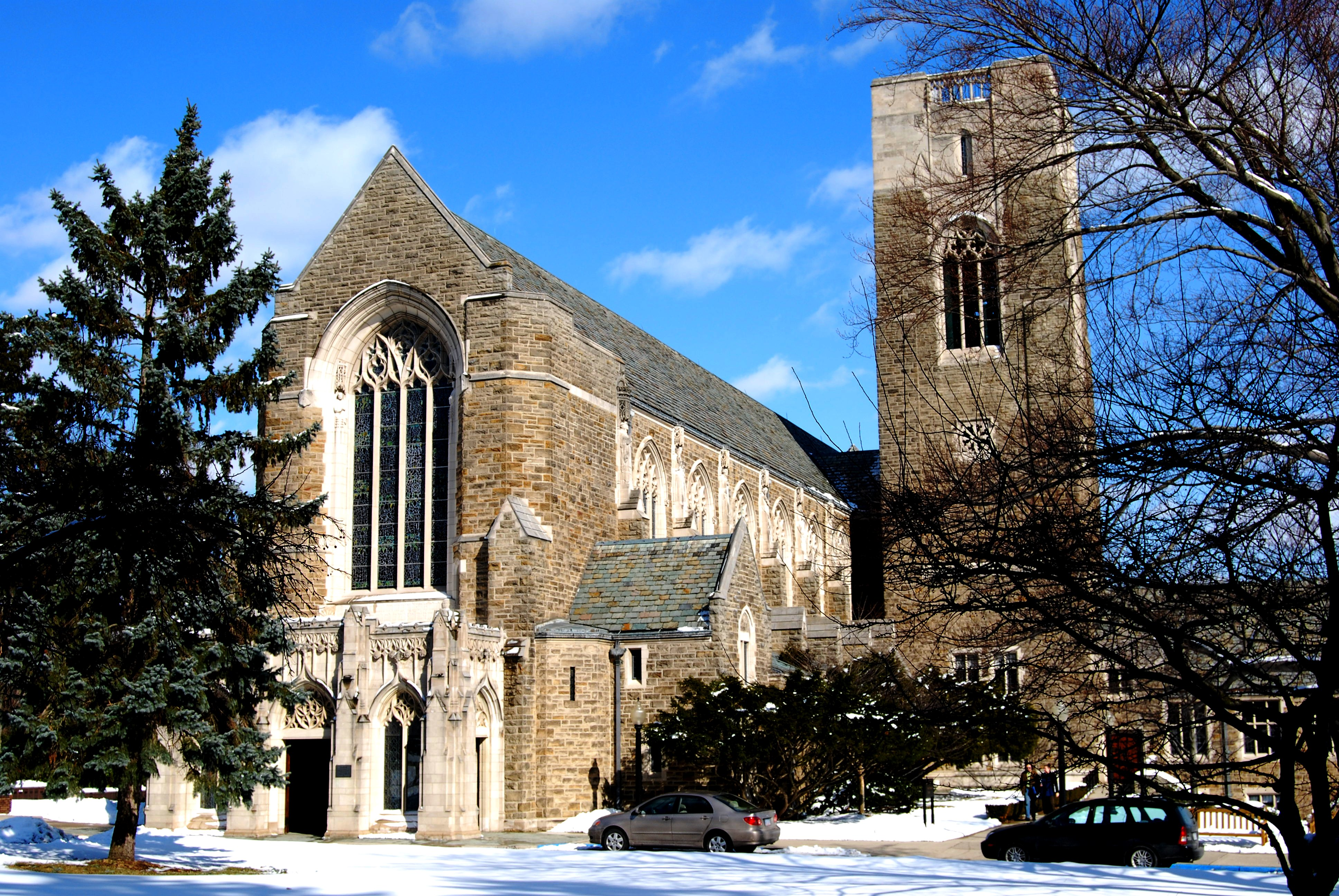
Christ Church Cranbrook, Bloomfield Hills, Michigan

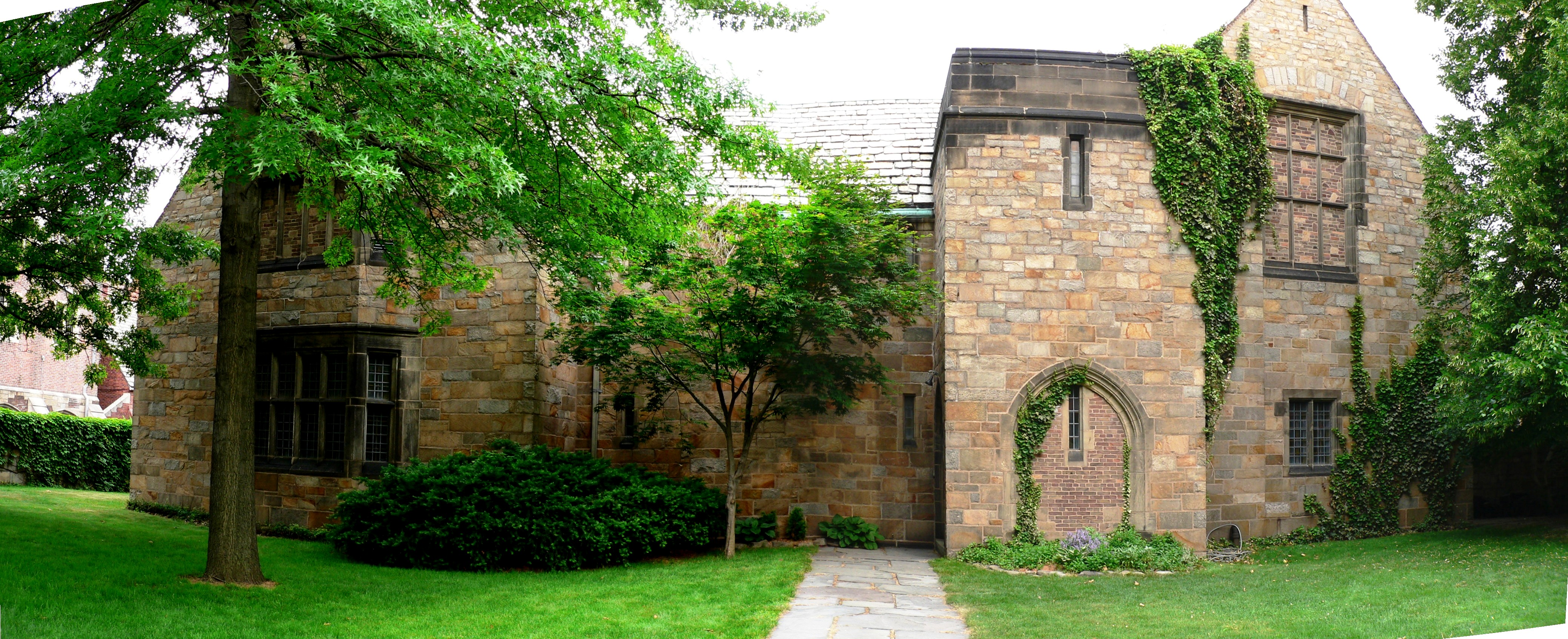
Yale College Wolf's Head Senior Society's "New Hall', designed c. 1924

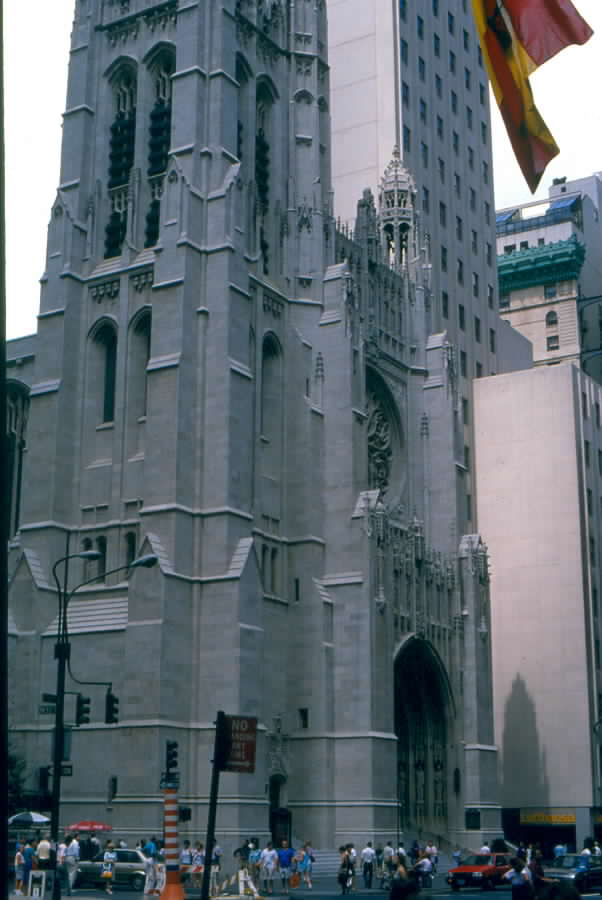
Saint Thomas Church, New York City, New York

- All Saints' Church, Ashmont, Massachusetts, 1892
- Church of the Advent (Boston) (1875–1888 by Sturgis & Brigham), Lady Chapel Interior, 1894 (as Cram & Goodhue)
- Saint-Barnabas Church, North Hatley, Quebec (1893-1894)
- Public Library, Nashua, New Hampshire, 1902
- Grace Church Chapel, Chicago, Illinois, 1904
- The Chapel and the original campus of the United States Military Academy, West Point, New York, 1906
- El Fureidis in Montecito, California, 1906
- Saint Thomas Church in New York City, 1906
- St. James' Episcopal Church in South Pasadena, 1907
- First Baptist Church, Pittsburgh, Pennsylvania, 1909
- St. John's Episcopal Church in West Hartford, Connecticut, 1909
- Kitchi Gammi Club, Duluth, Minnesota, 1912
- St. Paul's Episcopal Church, Duluth, Minnesota, 1912
- Church of the Intercession, New York, 1913
- St. Bartholomew's Church, New York City, 1913
- Hotel Washington, Colón, Panama, 1913
- Saint Mark's Episcopal Church, Mount Kisco, New York, 1913
- Trinity Episcopal Church, Asheville, North Carolina, 1913 (Note: Said to be similar to Louisville, Kentucky's Church of Our Merciful Saviour, possibly also designed by Goodhue.)
- Ford Hall, Rutgers University, 1914
- Hartley Building, Duluth, Minnesota, 1914
- Virginia Military Institute, Lexington, Virginia, 1914
- Cavour Hartley House, Duluth, Minnesota, 1915
- El Prado Quadrangle, the Fine Arts Gallery and the California Building (now the Museum of Us), all part of the Panama–California Exposition in Balboa Park, San Diego, California, 1915
- Rockefeller Chapel, University of Chicago, Chicago, Illinois, commissioned 1918, built 1925–1928
- The town plan and several buildings for the "Million Dollar Ghost Town", Tyrone, New Mexico
- Grolier Club Library, New York City, 1917
- St. Vincent Ferrer, New York City, 1920
- Oahu College and Kamehameha Schools, Honolulu, Hawaii, 1915–1920
- First Congregational Church (Montclair, New Jersey)
- Marine Corps Recruit Depot San Diego, San Diego, California, 1921
- Sanctuary of St. Mary's-in-Tuxedo Episcopal Church, Tuxedo Park, New York, 1922.
- The American Cathedral of the Holy Trinity, Paris, France, War Memorial and Cloister Wall, 1922-1923.
- Los Angeles Central Library, Downtown Los Angeles, California, 1924
- Nebraska State Capitol, Lincoln, Nebraska, 1924
- National Academy of Sciences Building, Washington, D.C., 1924
- Master Plan, the Physics Building, Dabney Hall, and other campus buildings for the California Institute of Technology (Caltech), Pasadena, California, 1924
- Fraternity House of the Rensselaer Society of Engineers, Troy, New York, 1922–1924
- Trinity English Lutheran Church, West End Historic District, Fort Wayne, Indiana, 1924
- Oriental Institute, University of Chicago, Chicago, Illinois, commissioned 1919, completed in 1931 by the successor firm of Mayers Murray & Phillip.
- Honolulu Museum of Art, Honolulu, Hawaii, commissioned 1922, completed 1927 by Hardie Phillip.
- Christ Church Cranbrook, Bloomfield Hills, Michigan, 1925–1928.
- Memorial Flagpole or Goodhue Flagpole, Pasadena, California, 1927
- Lihiwai (residence of the governor of the Territory of Hawaii), Honolulu, Hawaii, 1927–1929 (completed by Hardie Phillip).
- C. Brewer Building, Honolulu, Hawaii, completed 1931 by Hardie Phillip.
- House of Philip W. Henry, Linden Circle, Briarcliff Manor, New York
- Wolf's Head Society "New Hall", Yale University, New Haven, Connecticut, designed c. 1924, built posthumously
