= Church of Our Merciful Saviour (Louisville, Kentucky) =

Historic church in Kentucky, United States

- U.S. National Register of Historic Places
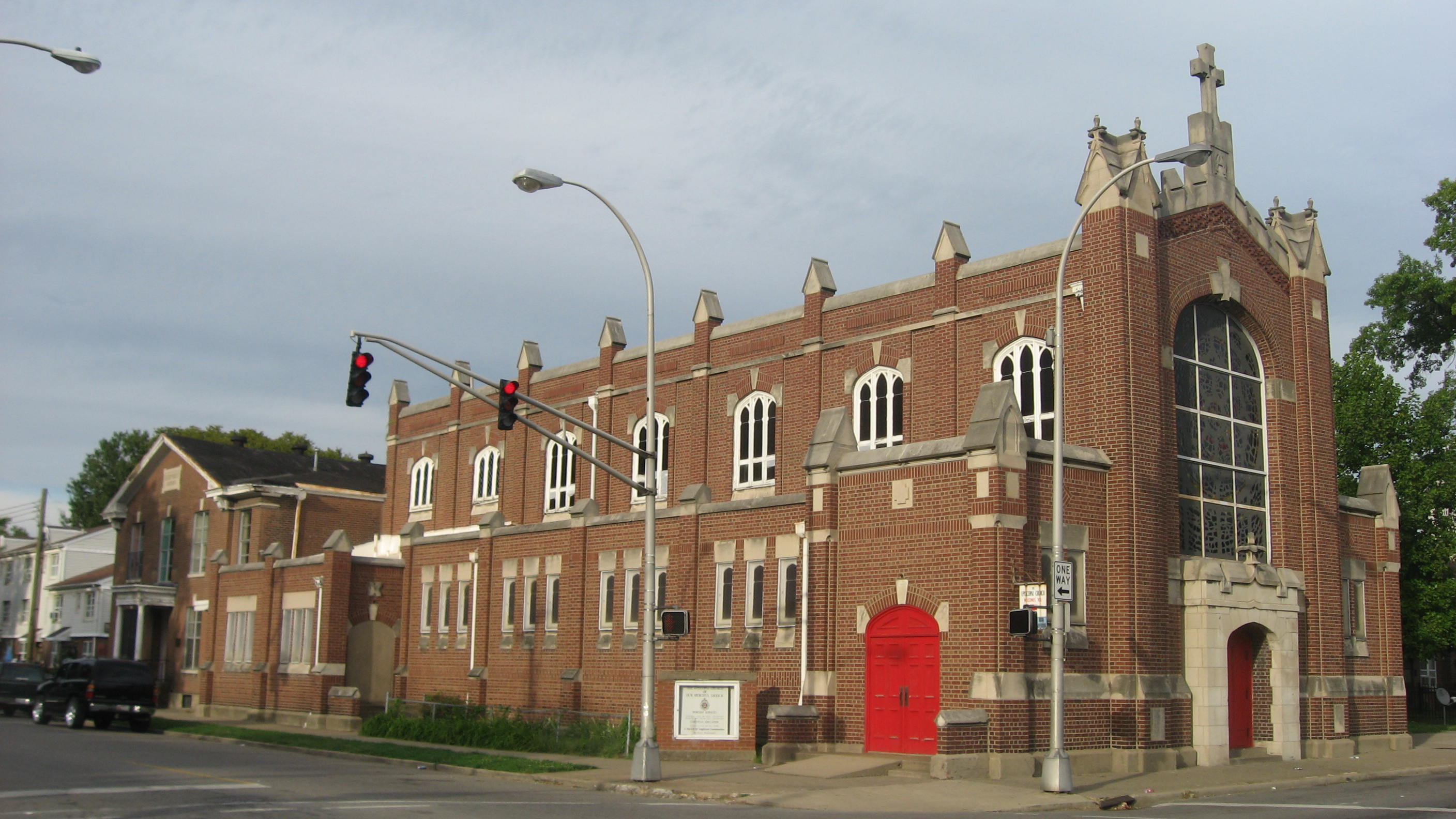
- Front and western side at sunset

- Location within Kentucky Location within the United States
- Location: 473 S. 11th St., Louisville, Kentucky
- Coordinates: 38°15′10″N 85°47′29″W
- Area: less than one acre
- Built: 1912
- Architectural style: Late Gothic Revival
- MPS: West Louisville MRA
- NRHP reference No.: 83002648
- Added to NRHP: September 08, 1983

The Church of Our Merciful Saviour in Louisville, Kentucky was established in 1891. The church is located at 473 South 11th Street in Louisville's near west end. This historic church was built in the Late Gothic Revival style and was placed on the National Register of Historic Places in 1983. Today the church is active member parish of the Episcopal Diocese of Kentucky and serves mostly the African American community.

The congregation took the name Church of Our Merciful Saviour in 1873. After an 1890-built building was destroyed in a fire in 1912, the present church was built. The building's design is tentatively attributed to Bertram Goodhue and has been asserted to be similar to his Trinity Episcopal Church in Asheville, North Carolina.

The church was sponsor of the first Boy Scout Troop for Negro boys in the United States in 1916.
