= El Fureidis =

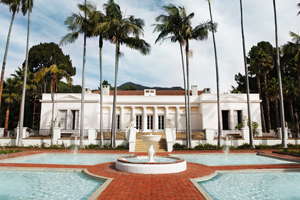
- Looking at El Fureidis from the gardens (Tai Kerbs)

- Location within California
- Alternative names: Gillespie Palace, James Waldron Gillespie Estate

General information
- Location: Montecito, California, United States, 631 Para Grande Lane
- Coordinates: 34°26′25″N 119°38′48″W
- Construction started: 1906

Technical details
- Size: 10 acres
- Floor area: More than 10,000 sq ft (930 m^{2})

Design and construction
- Architect: Bertram Grosvenor Goodhue

El Fureidis (Arabic for "Little Paradise") is a 10,000-square-foot (930 m^{2}) historic estate built in 1906 on 10 acres (4.0 ha) in Montecito, California. Originally called the James Waldron Gillespie Estate or Gillespie Palace after its original owner, the Spanish Baroque & Neo-Mudéjar architecture is one of only five houses designed by the American architect Bertram Grosvenor Goodhue.

The estate appeared in numerous hand-colored picture post cards from Santa Barbara during the 1900s–1950s highlighting Montecito's estates, the classical Persian gardens and Goodhue's unique architecture.

== Movie location ==
El Fureidis is most famous for being the source of rare palm trees now found in Disneyland's Adventureland and Jungle Cruise ride. It was also used in the main outside location shots for Tony Montana's Coral Gables mansion in the 1983 film Scarface.

The El Fureidis estate was last on the market in 2006 for $37,500,000. It has been reported that Sergey Grishin the "Scarface Oligarch" was the former owner from 2019 until his death in March 2023. Although this is not confirmed, other sources say the house was originally bought by Pradeep Yohanne Gupta, CEO of IQ Holdings in 2015.

As of 2025, it remains a private residence.
