= Mayers Murray & Phillip =

Mayers, Murray & Phillip was an architecture firm in New York City and the successor firm to Goodhue Associates, after Bertram Goodhue's unexpected death in 1924. The principals were Francis L.S. Mayers, Oscar Harold Murray, and Hardie Phillip.

== Overview ==
For the first few years after Goodhue's death, the firm was focused on executing Goodhue's unfinished projects and designs, which included eleven buildings on the Caltech campus alone. Buildings credited to the firm reflect Goodhue's characteristic massing and incorporation of ornament by longtime collaborators. Of the three architects, Hardie Phillip is solely credited with completing the Honolulu Museum of Art.

For the 1929 Church of the Heavenly Rest at 90th Street and Fifth Avenue in New York City, the firm completed a steel-frame, simplified Neo-Gothic limestone structure on land sold by the Carnegie family. The church features integrated architectural sculpture by Lee Lawrie in the form of Moses and John the Baptist emerging from the stonework, although most of the sculptural program was never executed.

The design of the 1931 Oriental Institute on the grounds of the University of Chicago partly reflects the Egyptian Revival craze of the 1920s on a particularly appropriate building. A bas-relief above the door by sculptor Ulric Ellerhusen and designed by Institute director James Henry Breasted, depicts various symbolic icons and hieroglyphics, figures including Herodotus and Julius Caesar, and includes an image of Goodhue's Nebraska State Capitol. Goodhue's own Rockefeller Chapel is nearby.

U.S. Secretary of the Interior Harold Ickes later hired the firm to design the Navajo Nation Council Chamber, the reservation's center of government, in Window Rock, Arizona. The 1935 building combines indigenous materials with Navajo architectural heritage. It remains in use and is a National Historic Landmark.

For the 1939 World's Fair, Mayers, Murray & Phillip designed the Medicine and Public Health Building with interior murals by Hildreth Meiere, and three large allegorical sculptures to represent American virtues: Humility (the Devil and Texan folklore figure Strap Buckner), Efficiency (Paul Bunyan), and Benevolence (Johnny Appleseed).

A surviving portion of Mayers, Murray & Phillip's archive, including architectural drawings and photographs, is held by the Avery Architectural and Fine Arts Library at Columbia University.
