= Kitchi Gammi Club =

- U.S. National Register of Historic Places
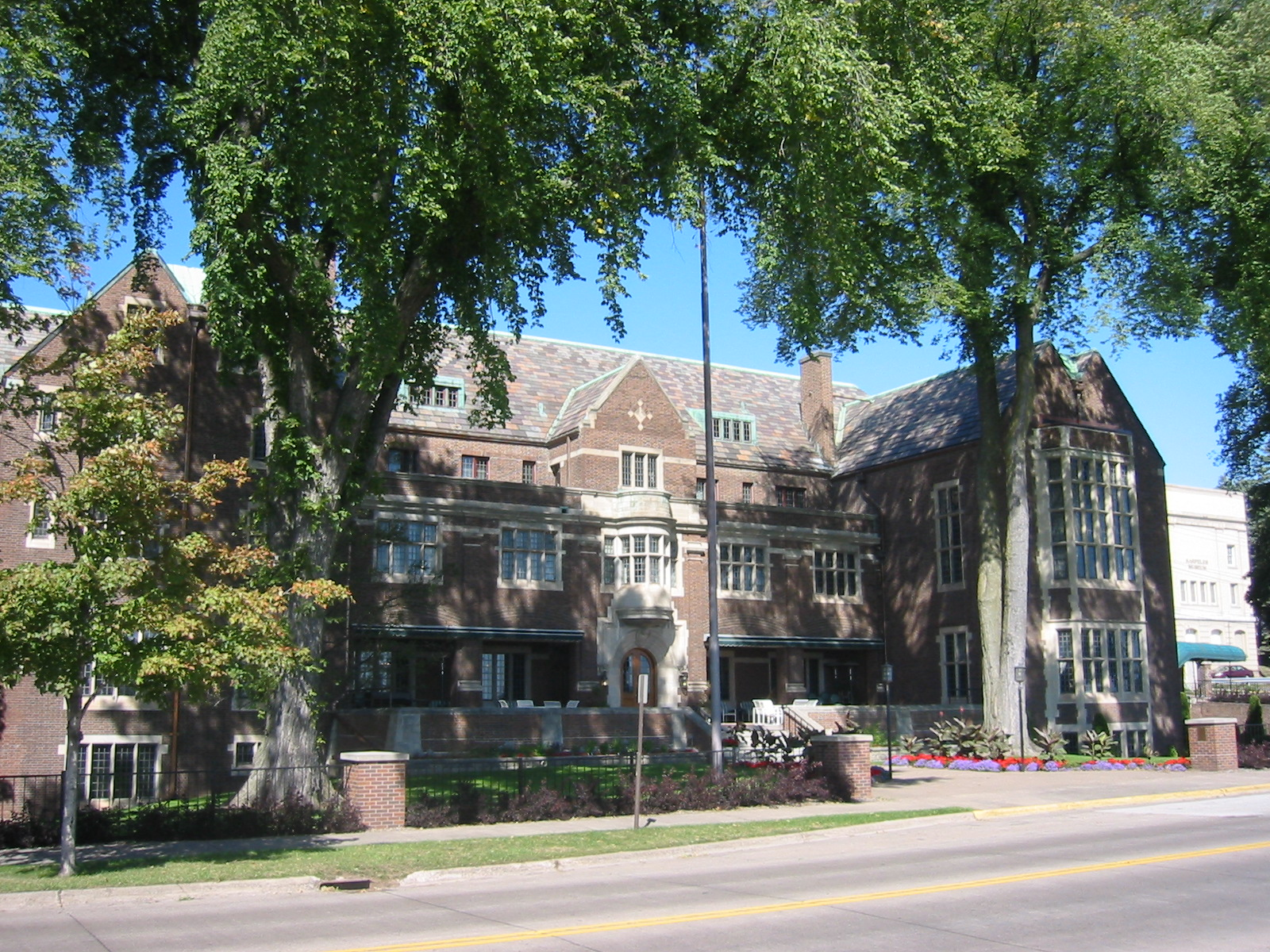
- The Kitchi Gammi Club viewed from the south

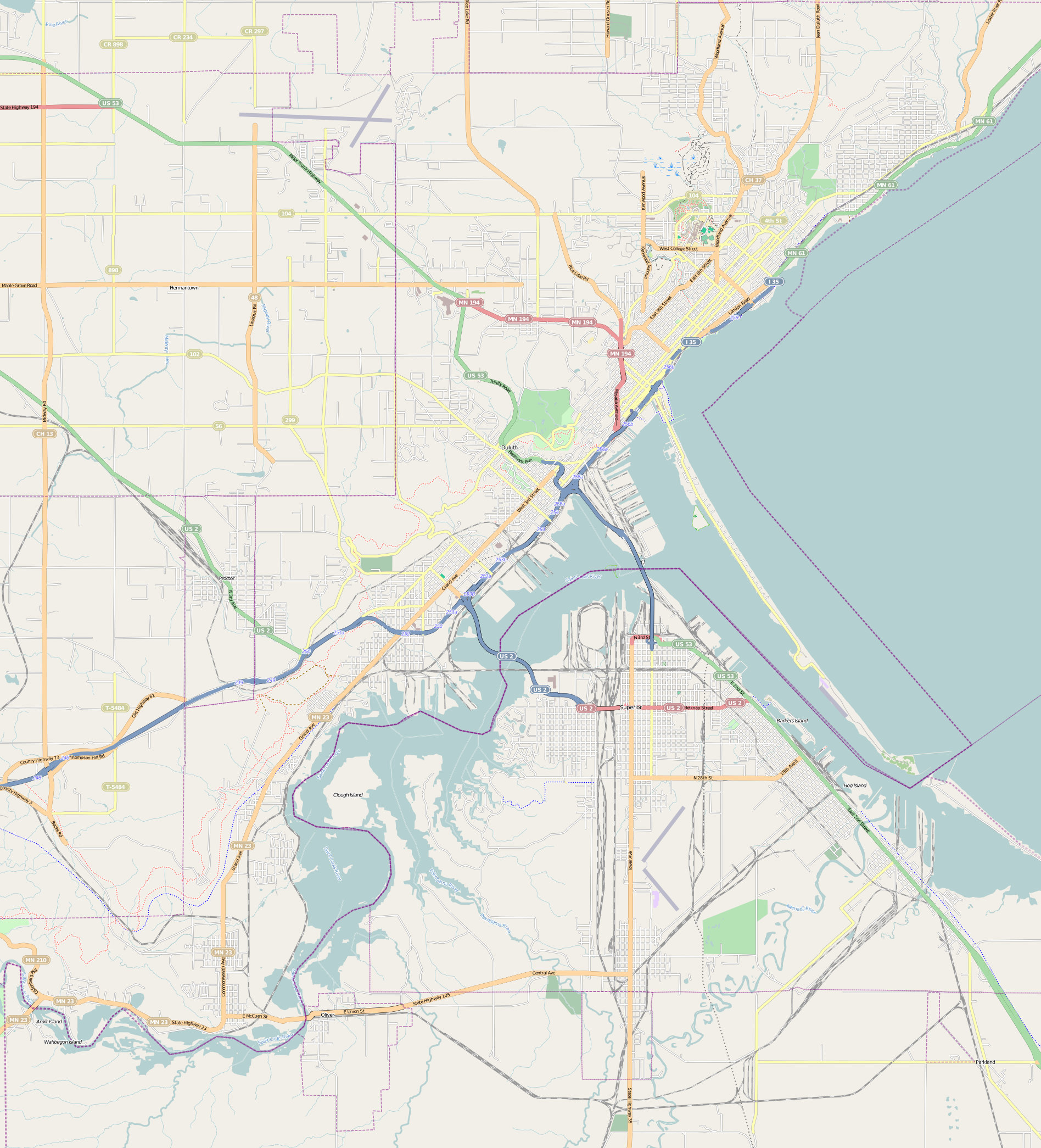
- Location within Duluth Location within Minnesota Location within the United States
- Location: 831 E. Superior Street, Duluth, Minnesota
- Coordinates: 46°47′43.5″N 92°5′16″W
- Area: 1 acre (0.40 ha)
- Built: 1912–13
- Architect: Cram, Goodhue and Ferguson
- Architectural style: Georgian/Gothic Revival
- NRHP reference No.: 75002090
- Added to NRHP: April 16, 1975

The Kitchi Gammi Club is the oldest incorporated club in the U.S. state of Minnesota, founded in 1883. Its historic clubhouse in Duluth, Minnesota, was built from 1912 to 1913. In 1975 the clubhouse was listed on the National Register of Historic Places for its state-level significance in the theme of architecture. It was nominated for its fine Georgian/Gothic Revival design by Bertram Goodhue and its superlative craftsmanship.

== See also ==
- List of gentlemen's clubs in the United States
- National Register of Historic Places listings in St. Louis County, Minnesota
