= Jackling =

Jackling is a surname which may refer to:

People

- Daniel C. Jackling (1869–1956), American mining and metallurgical engineer
- Sir Roger Jackling (diplomat) (1913–1986), British ambassador
- Sir Roger Jackling (civil servant) (born 1943), British civil servant
- Tom Jackling (c.1750–1797), English bare-knuckle boxer, ring name Tom Johnson

Other

- Jackling House, California
