= George Fox Steedman =

American businessman and inventor (1871–1940)

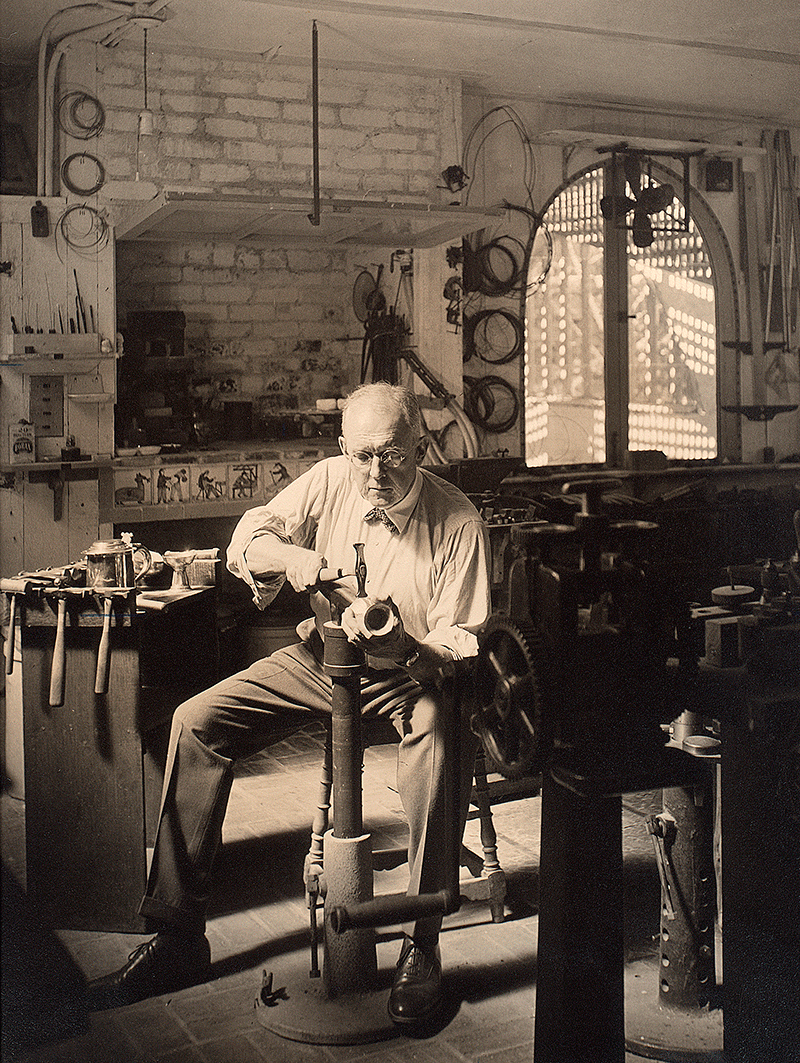
- Born: January 5, 1871; St. Louis, Missouri, U.S.
- Died: April 28, 1940 (aged 69); Montecito, California, U.S.
- Education: Harvard University
- Occupation: Industrialist
- Employer: Curtis Manufacturing Company
- Spouse: Carrie Robb Howard
- Children: Katherine Steedman, Medora Steedman

George Fox Steedman (January 5, 1871 – April 28, 1940) was an American industrialist and inventor. He was the president of Curtis Manufacturing Co., a foundry and machine shop. He built Casa del Herrero, a National Historic Landmark in California.

== Early life ==
Steedman was born on January 5, 1871, in St. Louis, Missouri. His parents were Medora "Dora" Harrison and Dr. Isaiah George Washington Steedman. His father was a doctor who also had business interests, including the foundry and manufacturing firm Curtis Company. Steedman was the middle of three brothers.

Steedman attended the Manual Training School, followed by Washington University in St. Louis. He graduated magna cum laude from Harvard University in 1892. While at Harvard, he was a member of Delta Kappa Epsilon (aka The Dickey Club).

== Career ==
Steedman operated the Curtis Company with his two brothers. The company made saws, air compressors, pneumatic equipment, and saws. Steedman studied machinery, becoming knowledgeable about the design and production. He received more than forty patents for his inventions.

In 1903, Steedman became president of the Curtis Manufacturing Company. The company made a fortune by securing contracts with the American and British governments during World War I. Steedman was diagnosed with a serious heart condition and shifted his focus from the business. He retired from Curtis Manufacturing Co. on Armistice Day, 1918.

== Philanthropy ==
In 1926, George Fox Steedman and his sister-in-law, Virginia Clark Weddell, endowed the James Harrison Steedman Traveling Fellowship in Architecture at Washington University with $30,000 in memory of his late brother.

Steedman donated a collection of 600 architectural and allied arts books to the St. Louis Public Library in 1928. He amassed the book collection during a trip to Europe with Louis LeBeaume, a friend and architect. He gave $25,000 so that the public library could construct an addition to house the George Fox Stedman Architectural Collection and also provided $10,000 fund to add to the collection.

== Personal life ==
Steedman married Carrie Robb Howard of St. Louis on June 27, 1903 Christ Church Cathedral. They had two daughters, Katherine and Medora. They lived at 34 Westmoreland Place in St. Louis.

In 1922, Steedman purchased eleven acres in Montecito, California. He discovered the area earlier that year when visiting his brother James who was receiving treatment for diabetes at the Sansum Medical Clinic. In 1925, George Washington Smith designed a summer home, Casa del Herrero (House of the Blacksmith), for the property. The Steedmans moved into the house on the day of the 1925 Santa Barbara earthquake. The house was decorated with antiques, tapestries, and tiles that Steedman shopped for in Spain in 1923. It had elaborate gardens designed by Ralph Stevens and Lockwood de Forest. In 1930, the Steedmans made it their permanent residence.

Steedman took up silversmithing, training with leading silversmith George Gebelein in Boston in 1927. Steedman worked with architect Floyd Brewster to design a workshop on the Casa del Herrero estate in 1930. In his retirement, he used the workshop for metalsmithing, silversmithing, and photography.

Steedman died on April 28, 1940, at his home in Montecito at the age of 69. Carrie Steedman continued to live in Casa del Herrero until she died in 1962. Casa del Herreo listed on the National Register of Historic Places and is a National Historic Landmark.
