= Roger Jackling =

Roger Jackling may refer to:

- Sir Roger Jackling (civil servant) (born 1943), British civil servant
- Sir Roger Jackling (diplomat) (1913–1986), his father, British diplomat
