= Lutah Maria Riggs =

American architect

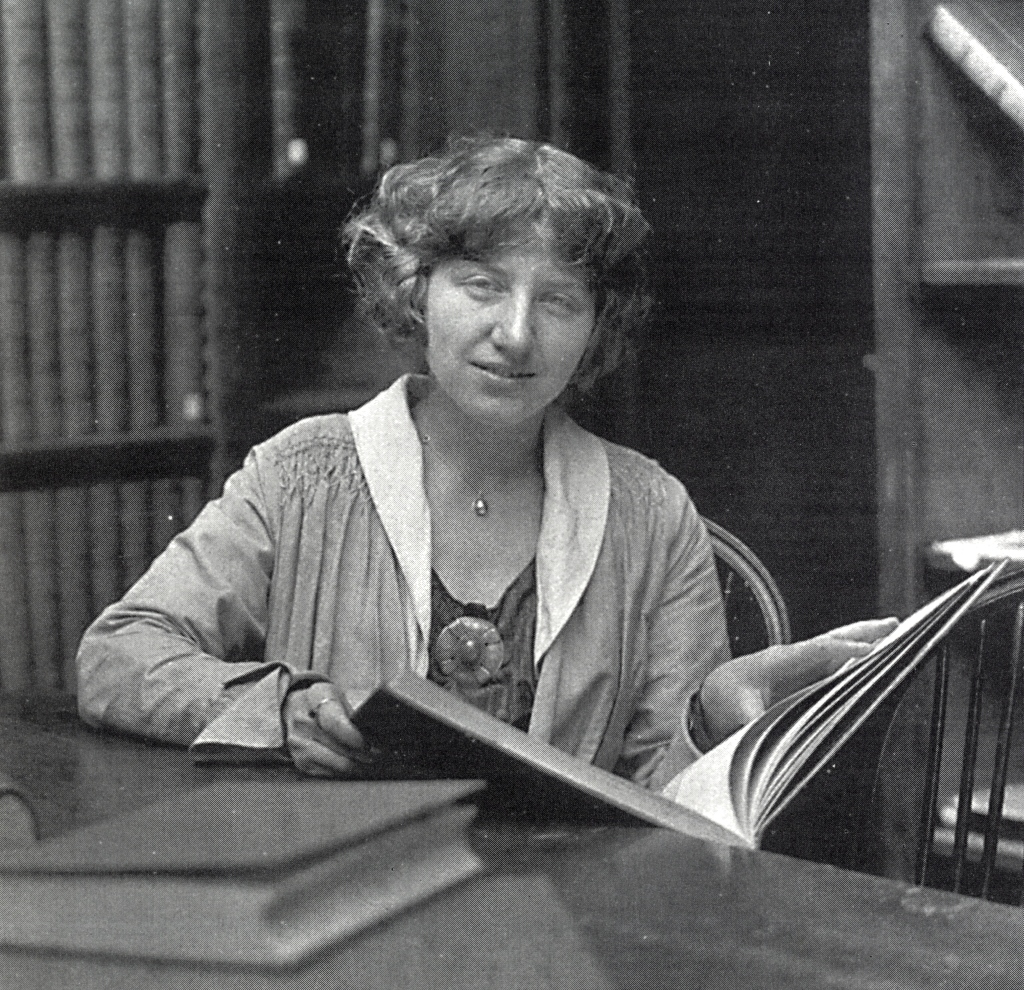
- Born: October 31, 1896; Toledo, Ohio, U.S.
- Died: March 8, 1984 (aged 87); Montecito, California, U.S.
- Education: University of California, Berkeley
- Occupation: Architect

Lutah Maria Riggs FAIA (October 31, 1896 – March 8, 1984) was an American architect who worked for several decades in Santa Barbara, California. Born in Toledo, Ohio, she moved with her mother to Santa Barbara after high school, where she returned after receiving a BA in architecture from the University of California, Berkeley. From 1921 to 1930, she worked as a draftswoman for George Washington Smith, and she continued to work as an architect in Santa Barbara until 1980, focusing primarily on residential work. She was the first licensed female architect in Santa Barbara, and the first woman in California to be named a Fellow of the American Institute of Architects.

== Early life and education ==
Lutah Maria Riggs was born in 1896 in Toledo, Ohio, the only child of a physician and a homemaker. Her father died when she was a child. She graduated from Manual Training High School in Indianapolis, Indiana in 1914. Later that same year, Riggs and her mother moved to Santa Barbara to join her stepfather.

Riggs completed her initial undergraduate studies at Santa Barbara City College, from which she received a certificate in 1917. She then won a scholarship to attend the University of California at Berkeley, from which she received her B.A. in architecture in 1919. Riggs completed graduate coursework at Berkeley in 1920, but moved back to Santa Barbara before finishing her graduate degree to be closer to her ailing mother.

== Career ==
Riggs began her architectural career in 1920, working in Susanville as a draftswoman and designer for architect Ralph D. Taylor. After working for Taylor for a few months, she moved to Santa Barbara and worked as a draftswoman for the noted Spanish Revival architect George Washington Smith. Smith and his wife were so taken by Riggs that she became somewhat of a surrogate daughter to the couple. She travelled with the Smith family on their architectural study trips to Mexico in 1922, and Europe in 1924. Also in 1924, Riggs was made partner in the firm, and given the title of chief draftswoman. Riggs eventually became extremely influential in much of the firm's design work, and in some cases was fully responsible for the design of commissions. She contributed significantly to the designs for some of Smith's most well-known buildings, including the Lobero Theatre, El Paseo historical complex, and Casa del Herrero.

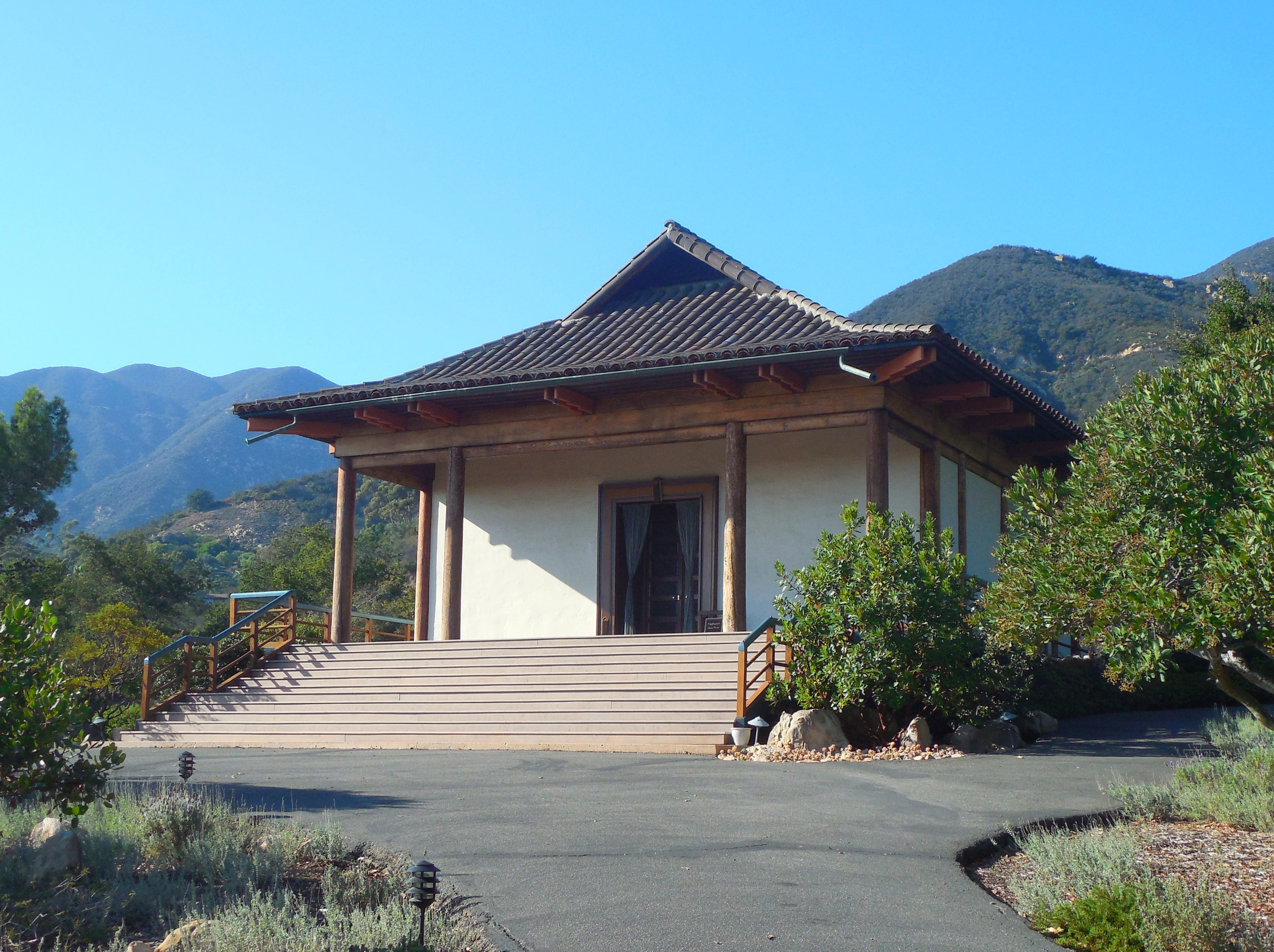
Santa Barbara Vedanta Temple in Montecito, California

In 1928, Riggs obtained her architectural license. She continued to work for George Washington Smith through 1930, when Smith had a sudden heart attack and died. After a short stint working in partnership with colleagues, in 1931 Riggs started her own firm, which she ran until 1942. During these years Riggs completed a fair amount of residential work for wealthy clients in the Santa Barbara/Montecito area, as well as some commercial/institutional work, such as the Blaksley Library at the Santa Barbara Botanic Garden (1942). She also designed modest residences for the Rolling Hills development on the Palos Verdes peninsula south of Los Angeles. During World War II, Riggs worked briefly as a set designer on MGM and Warner Brothers films.

In 1946 Riggs began a partnership with Arvin Shaw, continuing to focus on residential work, though in a more modernist style, as seen in her design for the Alice Erving house in Montecito (1951). The Erving house is well known for its unique siting that maintains privacy while opening up to expansive views of the surrounding mountains, as well as for its floor-to-ceiling windows and vaulted ceilings. In 1951, she left the partnership to work on her own, continuing to do residential as well as some commercial work. One of her most famous buildings from this era is her design for the Santa Barbara Vedanta Temple (1956), noted for its reflection of early South Indian wooden temple architecture.

In addition to running her practice, Riggs was active in her local AIA chapter, and served on the California Architects' Board as both a member and a commissioner. In 1960, she was named a Fellow of the American Institute of Architects for "excellence in design and service to the profession". In 1967, the Los Angeles Times named her "Woman of the Year", the first architect to be chosen for this honor. Riggs continued to practice architecture through 1980, and died in Montecito, California, in 1984. The Architectural Foundation of Santa Barbara has funded a yearly scholarship in Riggs' name, to be given to architectural students, with special consideration for women.

== Works ==
Name	City	US State/Country	Completed	Other Information	Image
Alexander, Harold B. medical building	Santa Barbara	California	1952		
Alexander, Taylor house	Rolling Hills	California	1939		
Allen, Harry B. house Sea Cliff Cove	Santa Barbara	California	1930		
Allen, Harry B. house Sea Cliff Cove	Cape May	New Jersey	1968		
Ames, Richard McCurdy house remodel and additions	Santa Barbara	California	1955		
Andrews, William H. house San Ysidro Lane	Santa Barbara	California	1930		
Armand, Jean Ravenel crematorium chapel plaque	Santa Barbara	California	1930		
Bacon, G. Norman house and guest cottage remodel Hope Ranch Park	Santa Barbara	California	1954		
Bank of America exterior design	Santa Barbara	California	1966		
Barron, Harry shopping complex	Hollywood	California			
Berkey, Peter III house ( 3505 Padaro Lane )	Carpinteria	California	1961		
Bogeaus, Benedict E. house remodel	Beverly Hills	California	1946		
Bradley, William house and barn 3550 Calzado Ave.	Santa Ynez	California	1974		
Brooks, Lenore house Williamsburg Lane	Rolling Hills	California	1939		
Brooksbank, Percy A. house Folded Hills Ranch	Gaviota	California	1946		
Burke, Margaret house remodel/apartment	Palm Springs	California	1939		
Busby, Dr. and Mrs. William house	Summerland	California	1963		
California State Highway Commission U.S. 101 Freeway Widening Plan	Santa Barbara	California	1954-58		
Campbell, Mrs. Charles house	Santa Ynez	California	1963		
Carpenter, Charles M. house	Bel Air	California	1948		
Cate School library	Carpinteria	California	1964		
Chace, Russell house 47227 W. Eldorado Dr.	Palm Desert	California	1964		
Chadwick Seaside School house	Rolling Hills	California	1939		
Cheney, Charles house addition	Fisher's Island	New York	1931		
Church of Jesus Christ of the Latter Day Saints church remodel	San Pedro	California	1940		
Clark, Mrs. Alfred house	San Francisco	California	1955		
Collier, Mrs. Gertrude A. stained glass window for crematorium Santa Barbara Cemetery	Santa Barbara	California	1930		
Colville, Miss Frances house 6865 Del Playa Dr.	Isla Vista	California	1957		
Comparte, Al J. guest house and house remodel 1369 Bobolink Pl.	Los Angeles	California	1946		
Cooper, William H. house La Vina Ranco	Lompoc	California	1936		
Crocker, Templeton house	Pebble Beach	California	1930		
Cypress Point Golf Club house	Pebble Beach	California	1928-1930		
