= Kenneth Macdonald (civil servant) =

British civil servant (1930–2025)

Sir Kenneth Carmichael Macdonald, KCB (25 July 1930 – 24 February 2025) was a British civil servant and businessman.

== Life and career ==
Educated at Hutchesons' Grammar School and the University of Glasgow, he served in the Royal Air Force for two years before entering the civil service in 1954 as an official in the Air Ministry. After three years at HM Treasury, he was moved to the Ministry of Defence (MoD) in 1965. Promoted to deputy secretary in 1980, he served as the MoD's Second Permanent Secretary from 1988 to 1990.

He was then chairman of Raytheon (Europe) Ltd from 1991 to 1994 and of Raytheon Systems Ltd from 1991 to 2000.

Macdonald died on 24 February 2025, at the age of 94.

Government offices
Preceded by Sir John Blelloch	Second Permanent Secretary of the Ministry of Defence; 1988–1990	Succeeded by Sir Moray Stewart
