= Daniel C. Jackling =

Mining engineer (1869–1956)

- Daniel C. Jackling
- Born: August 14, 1869
- Died: March 13, 1956 (aged 86)
- Engineering career
- Projects: exploitation of low-grade porphyry copper
- Awards: Distinguished Service Medal (1919); John Fritz Medal (1933)

Daniel Cowan Jackling (August 14, 1869 – March 13, 1956), was an American mining and metallurgical engineer who pioneered the exploitation of low-grade porphyry copper ores at the Bingham Canyon Mine, Utah.

He was widely known as "Colonel Jackling", having gained this rank in the Utah National Guard.

== Biography ==
=== Early life ===
Born in Hudson Township, Bates County, Missouri, near Appleton City, Jackling was an orphan at the age of two. Raised for a while by an aunt, Jackling eventually had to pass from family to family but finished eighth grade by the age of sixteen and then enrolled in the Normal School at Warrensburg, Missouri.

Starting in 1889, Daniel Jackling was educated in the mining and metallurgy disciplines at the Missouri School of Mines in Rolla, Missouri, now known as Missouri University of Science and Technology, eventually earning a BS degree. From 1891 until 1893 he taught chemistry and metallurgy as an assistant professor.

=== Career ===
Jackling worked at the Cripple Creek & Victor Gold Mine from 1893 until 1895, first as a miner, then as a millman and metallurgist. Starting in 1896, Jackling worked for Joseph Raphael De Lamar in Mercur, Utah where he developed a cyanide process for extracting gold ore.

Jackling followed up at the Missouri School of Mines with a degree in metallurgical engineering in 1900, then worked a gold mine in Republic, Washington. In 1902, he managed Charles MacNeill's and Spencer Penrose's zinc-pigment plant in Canon City, Colorado and their gold mill at Colorado City, Colorado.

In the mid-1890s, Jackling, Hartwig Cohen and mining engineer Robert C. Gemmell made a detailed examination of the Bingham Canyon, Utah, copper property, most of which was owned by Enos Andrew Wall. Jackling and Gemmell "liked the prospect." On June 4, 1903, Jackling organized the Utah Copper Company to put his plan into action. Investors included Charles L. Tutt, Sr., Charles MacNeill, Spencer Penrose, Boies Penrose, Tal Penrose, and Dr. R.A.F. Penrose. Jackling was named general manager.

In 1904, Jackling recommended open pit mining, using steam shovels to load railroad cars. The mine proved to be profitable, and became the "showplace for railroad-pit operations" of low-grade copper deposits. By 1912, Bingham Canyon Mine and the nearby ASARCO smelting operations were "the largest industrial mining complex in the world."

In 1905, Jackling "pushed development" of the Veteran Mine outside Ruth, Nevada, eventually becoming president of Nevada Consolidated Copper Corporation. Utah Copper Company, eventually the Western Mines Division of Kennecott Copper Corporation, acquired Ray Consolidated Copper Mines in Arizona and Chino Copper Company in New Mexico through Jackling's promotion. He was the central figure in the Porphyry group of copper properties, holding executive positions in them. Early in the 20th century, he was reported to have an income of $1,000,000 a year from his copper interests alone.

In 1912 Jackling became president of Utah Power and Light Company. Also in 1912, Jackling formed the Alaska Gold Mines Company, which operated the Alaska-Gastineau Mine, at the time "the largest in the world."

He also held executive positions in railway and smelting companies, was a director of the Chase National Bank and Sinclair Oil Corporation, and was in charge of all the Western holdings of Kennecott Mining. After he retired in 1942, he continued only as chairman of the board of the Mesabi Iron Company.

His collected papers were given to the Stanford University Library.

=== Personal life ===
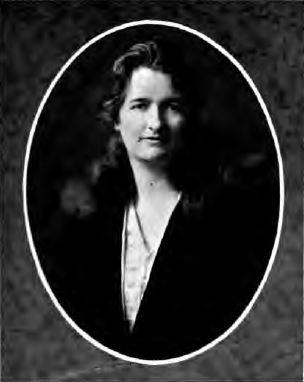
Virginia Jolliffe, the second Mrs. Daniel C. Jackling

Jackling's first wife, a schoolteacher, died in 1914. He married his second wife, Virginia Jolliffe, on April 5, 1915 or, according to the Stanford University Libraries, in 1919. His obituary in the New York Times noted that she survived him.

Jackling was a high spender and traveled widely in his private railroad car and in his steam yacht Cyprus. When he retired in 1942, he moved his headquarters from Salt Lake City to San Francisco, where he had the whole penthouse floor of the St. Francis Hotel remodeled for his use by Elsie de Wolfe. He was a member of the city's Pacific Union, Bohemian, and Press Clubs, and owned an estate on the San Francisco peninsula at Woodside, where he died in 1956.

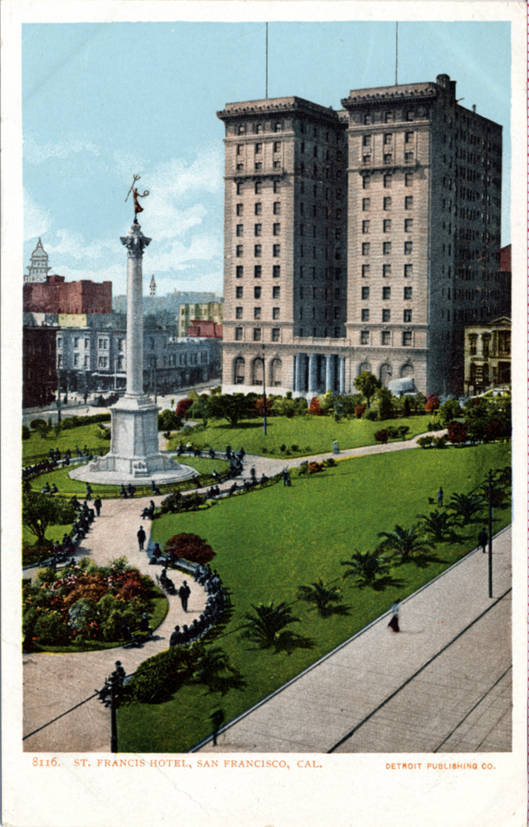
The St. Francis Hotel

=== Awards and recognition ===
Jackling was honored with numerous professional awards, including the Washington Award from the Western Society of Engineers for "pioneering in large-scale mining and treatment of low-grade copper ores, releasing vast resources from formerly worthless deposits." Jackling received the Distinguished Service Medal from President Woodrow Wilson in 1919 for directing the U.S. government explosives plants, like the one at Nitro, West Virginia, during World War I.

He was given honorary degrees by the Universities of California, Southern California, and Utah.

The Daniel C. Jackling Award, established in 1953, is presented annually by the Society for Mining, Metallurgy, and Exploration (SME) for "significant contributions to technical progress in mining, geology, and geophysics".

A statue of Jackling was placed in the rotunda of the Utah State Capitol in 1954.

The outdoor football stadium on the campus of Jackling's alma mater, now the Missouri University of Science and Technology, was named Jackling Field from its opening in 1967 until it was renamed Allgood–Bailey Stadium in 2000. The field itself retains Jackling's name. An original Jackling Field hosted football games elsewhere on the campus from 1915 to 1966; Jackling contributed $5000 for its construction.

== The Jackling House ==
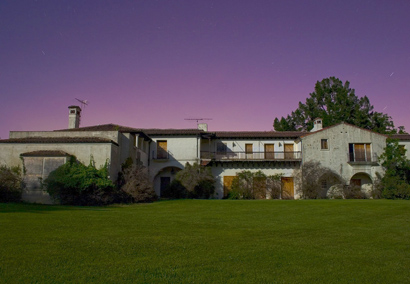
The Jackling House

The Jackling House at Woodside, California, was built for Jackling in 1925, designed in the Spanish Colonial Revival Style by the architect George Washington Smith.

In 1984, Steve Jobs purchased the 17,000 sq ft (1,600 m^{2}) property and lived in it for ten years. After that, he rented it out for a time, and in 2000, he stopped maintaining it. In 2004, Jobs stirred Woodside preservationist controversy by applying for a permit to tear the historic landmark down to build a smaller house. A judge ruled against demolition in early 2006. Jobs appealed the decision. In April 2007, the California State Supreme Court refused to hear the Jobs appeal, which meant he could not raze the house. Nonetheless, Jobs won approval to demolish the Jackling House from the Woodside Town Council on May 13, 2009.

The architectural-historical preservationists group Uphold Our Heritage challenged the town council's approval though it was upheld by a San Mateo County Superior Court judge in March 2010. On April 29, 2010, Uphold Our Heritage appealed the county judge's ruling. The town manager and the preservation group's attorney differed over whether the appeal put an "automatic stay" on the issuance of a demolition permit.

The house was demolished in February 2011.

== See also ==
- Copper extraction
- Kennecott Utah Copper Corporation
