= Caruso's =

Restaurant in Montecito, California, U.S.

- Interactive map of Caruso's

Restaurant information
- Established: March 2019; 7 years ago
- Owner: Rick J. Caruso
- Head chef: Massimo Falsini
- Chef: Shibani Mone
- Pastry chef: Vincent Donatelli
- Food type: Italian
- Rating: (Michelin Guide)
- Location: 1759 S. Jameson Lane (inside the Rosewood Miramar Beach Hotel), Montecito, Santa Barbara, California, 93108, United States
- Coordinates: 34°25′11″N 119°37′41.5″W
- Seating capacity: 85
- Reservations: Recommended
- Website: www.rosewoodhotels.com/en/miramar-beach-montecito/dining/carusos

Caruso's is a beachside Italian restaurant in Montecito, California, United States. The restaurant is located inside the Rosewood Miramar Beach Resort.

== Reception ==
The restaurant serves Coastal California Cuisine with an Italian cuisine, leaning and has received a Michelin star and Michelin Green Star for sustainable Gastronomy in 2022 and 2023.

== See also ==
- List of Italian restaurants
- List of Michelin-starred restaurants in California
