= Robert M. Colleary =

American comedy writer and producer (1929-2012)

Robert M. Colleary (1929 – January 8, 2012) was a Peabody and Emmy Award-winning comedy writer and producer who was best known for his writing for more than two decades for Captain Kangaroo. He also wrote forM*A*S*H and Barney Miller, and was a producer for Benson and It's a Living.

Colleary grew up in Montclair, New Jersey and attended the American Academy of Dramatic Arts, after which he served in the United States Army. In California, he found work flashing cue cards on the Hopalong Cassidy show and soon started writing for the program. He was hired as head writer for the Captain Kangaroo television show and spent 20 years there as head writer, which won two Peabody Awards during his tenure. He later wrote episodes of television shows, winning an Emmy Award for his work on Barney Miller.

A resident of Montecito, California, he died on January 8, 2012, at Santa Barbara Cottage Hospital in Santa Barbara, California.
