= Casa del Herrero =

Historic house in California, United States

- U.S. National Register of Historic Places
- U.S. National Historic Landmark

- Location within California
- Location: 1387 E. Valley Rd., Montecito, California
- Coordinates: 34°26′10.4″N 119°38′13.54″W
- Area: 10.9 acres (4.4 ha)
- Built: 1925
- Architectural style: Colonial Revival, Mediterranean Revival, Spanish Colonial Revival
- NRHP reference No.: 87000002

Significant dates
- Added to NRHP: January 29, 1987
- Designated NHL: January 16, 2009

Casa del Herrero (also known as the Steedman Estate) is a historic house museum and botanical garden located in Montecito near Santa Barbara, California. It was designed by George Washington Smith, and is considered one of the finest examples of Spanish Colonial Revival architecture in the United States. It is listed on the National Register of Historic Places, and was designated as a National Historic Landmark on January 16, 2009. As of 2026, the entire 11-acre (4.5 ha) site is owned and operated as a historic house museum and botanical garden by the 501(c)(3) non-profit organization, Casa del Herrero. The Casa del Herrero organization's mission is to restore and preserve the house and grounds for the benefit of the visiting public.

== History ==
Casa del Herrero (Spanish for "House of the Blacksmith") was designed for George Fox Steedman and his wife, who were moved west from St. Louis, by architect George Washington Smith. The residence was completed in 1925, and the Steedmans moved into it the same day as the Santa Barbara earthquake. Steedman – an industrialist, engineer, and amateur architect – assembled a team of architects, landscape architects, antiquarians, and horticulturists to produce the Casa del Herrero estate – an example of Spanish Colonial Revival architecture. Steedman participated in every detail of the property's buildings, furnishings, and gardens. In the 1930s, architect Lutah Maria Riggs designed the octagonal library addition.

Steedman died in 1940, and his widow continued to live there until her death in 1962. Their daughter Medora Bass then lived at the Casa until her death in 1987. The organization that now operates the estate was created in 1993 by her son.

== Tours and garden access ==
Docent-led tours of the Casa del Herrero house, gardens and blacksmith workshop are available by reservation only. The Casa del Herrero organization offers tours on Wednesdays and Saturdays, by reservation only. Private tours are available through special arrangement. The garden spaces are available for commercial and non-commercial photo shoots. The address is 1387 East Valley Road, Montecito, CA 93108.

== Gallery ==
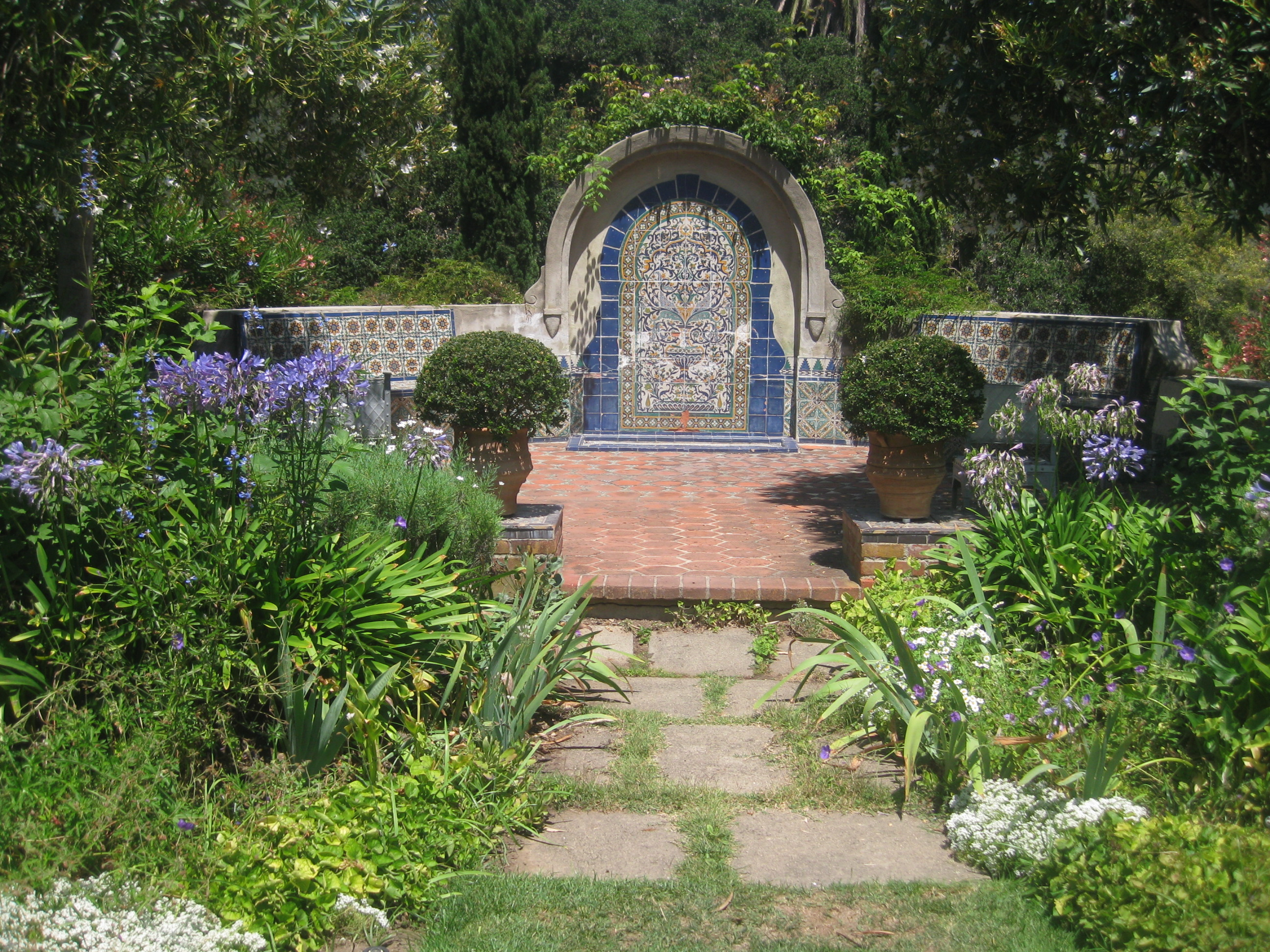

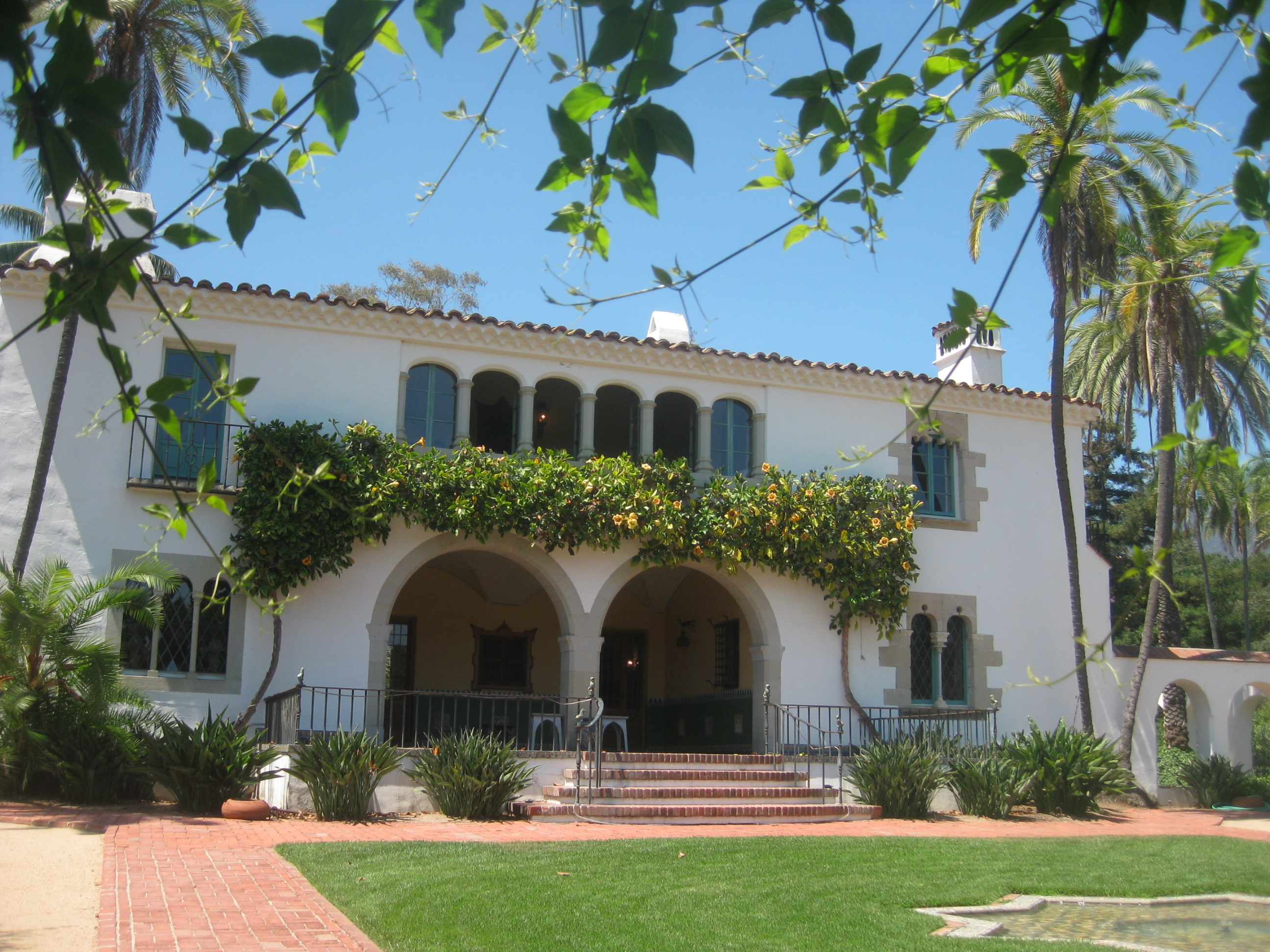

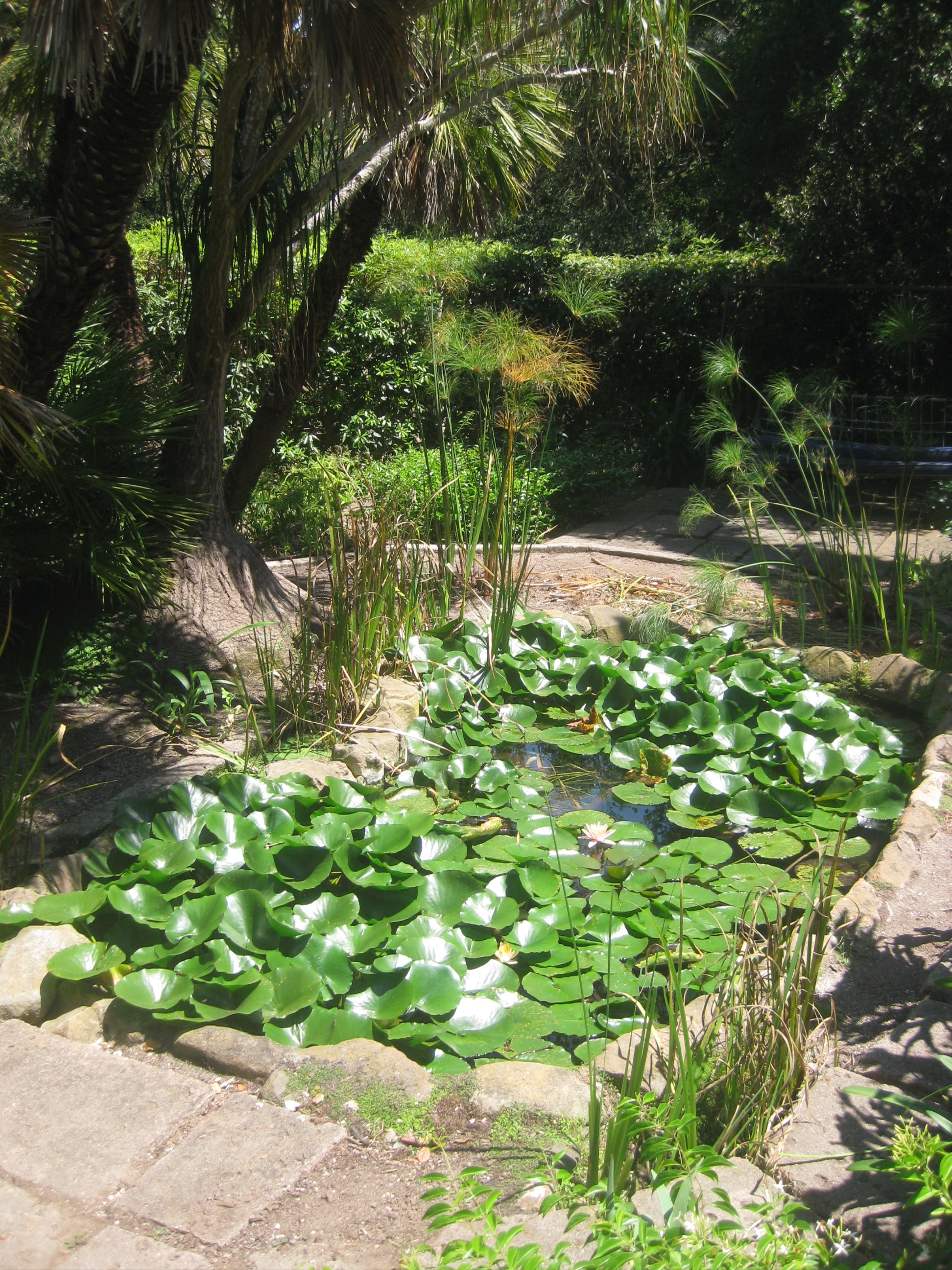

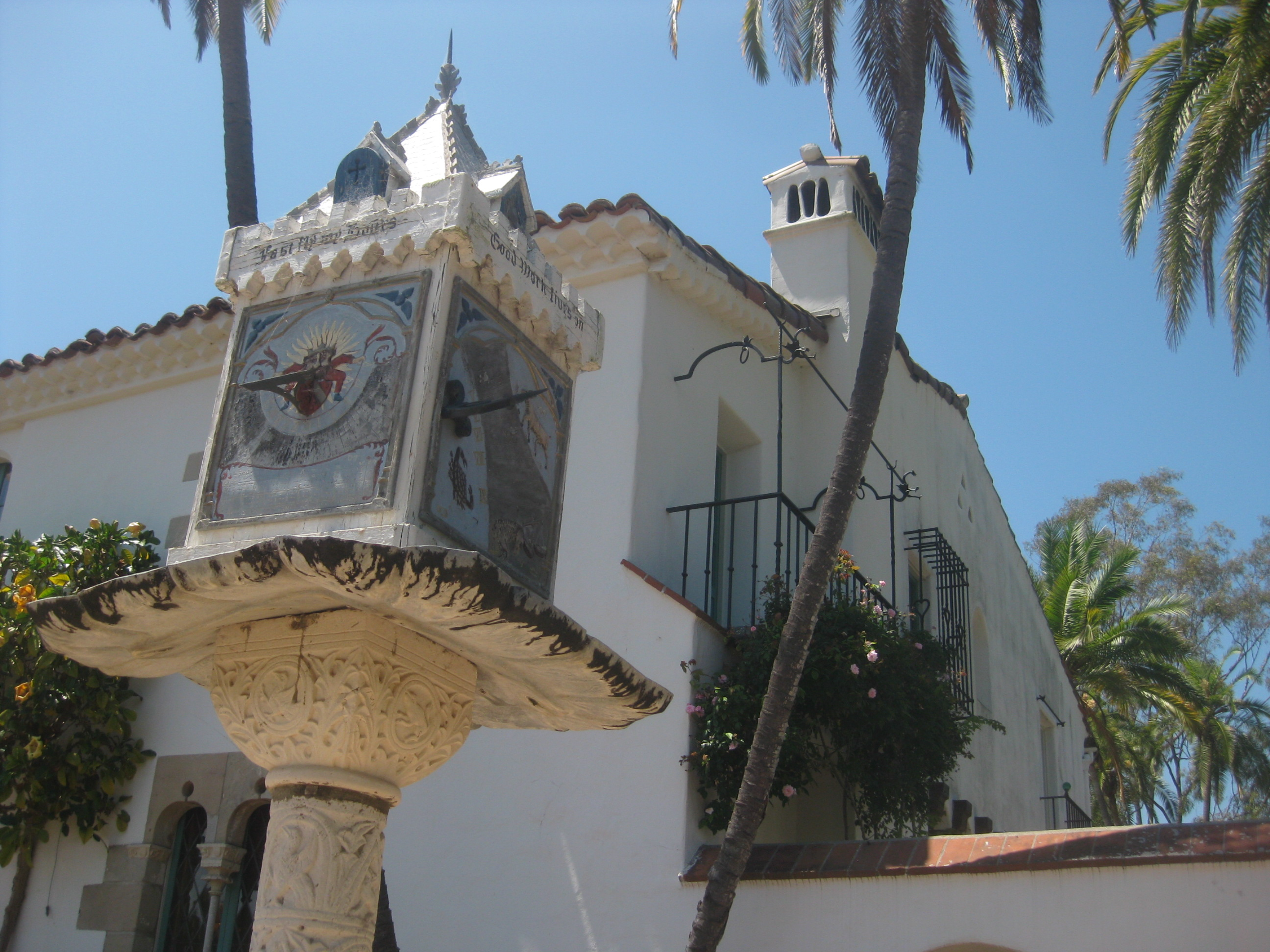

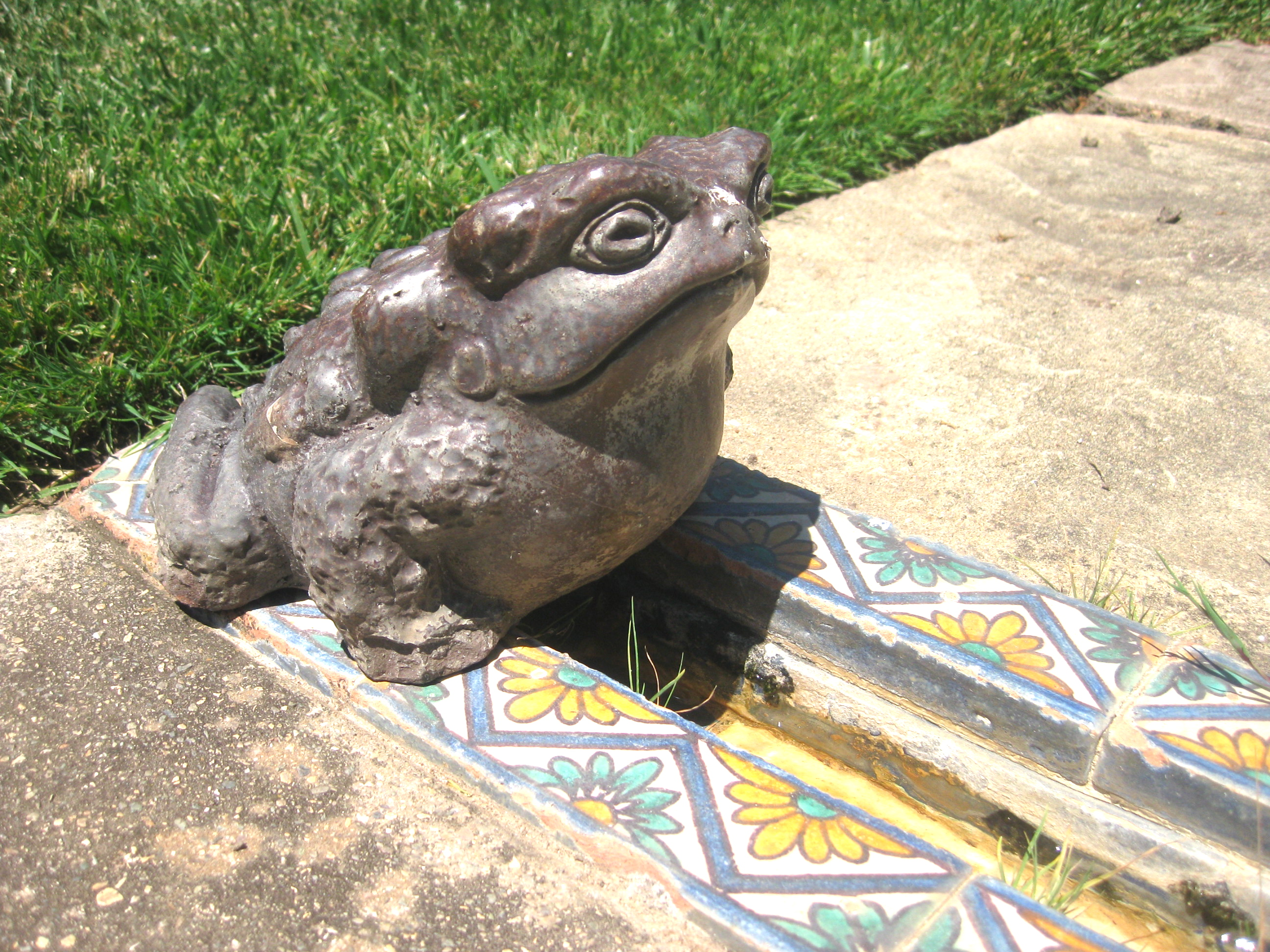

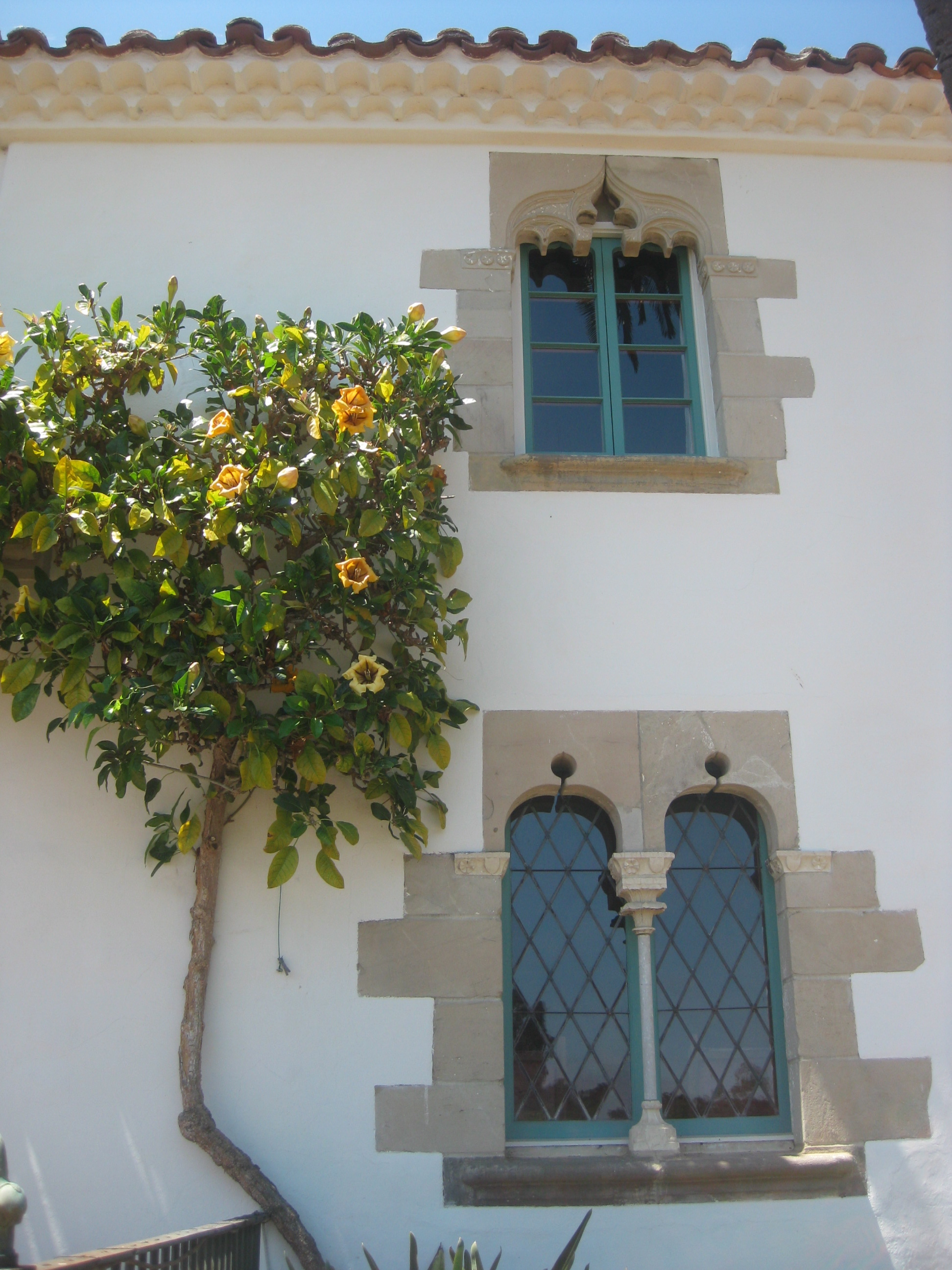

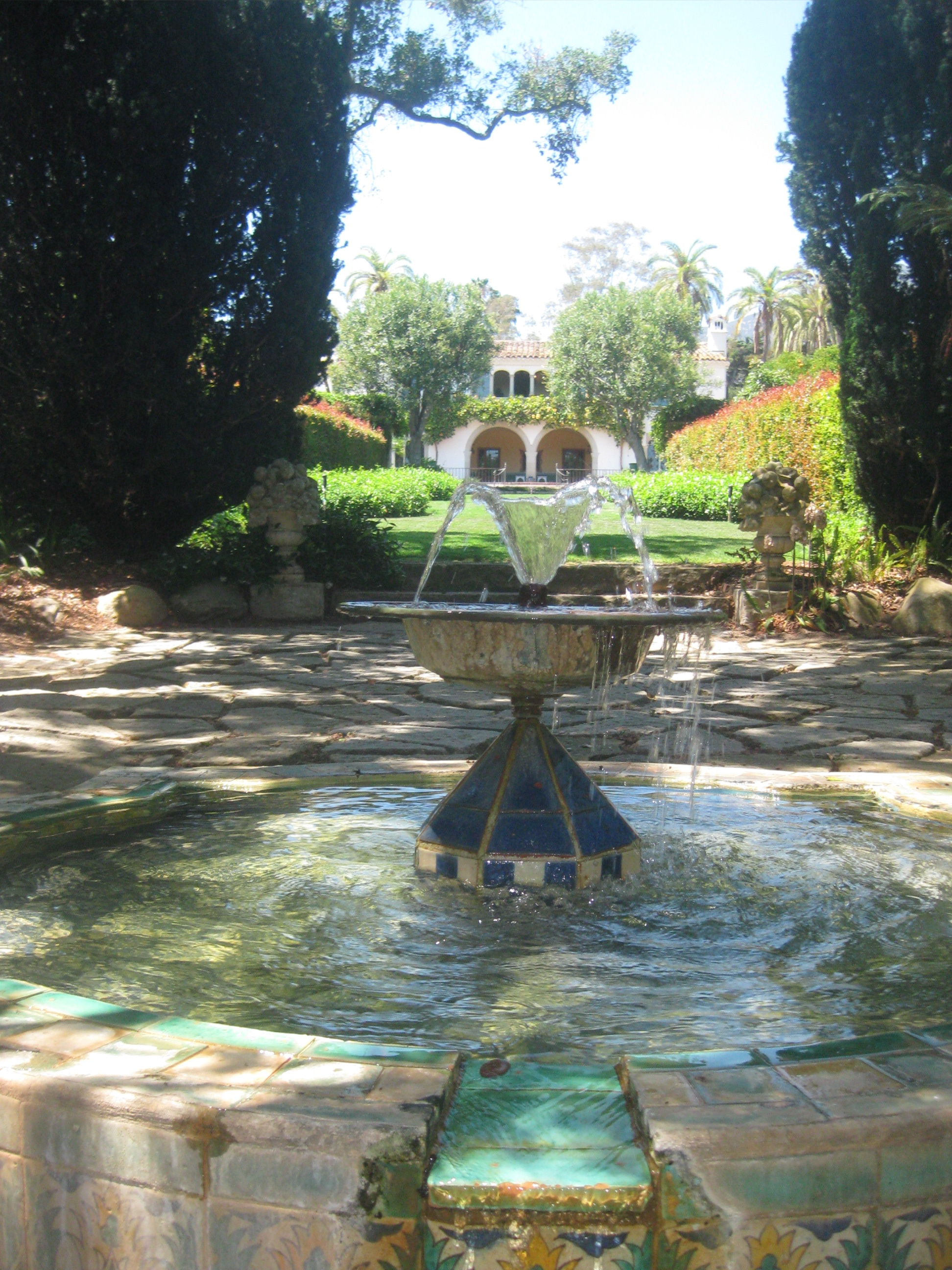

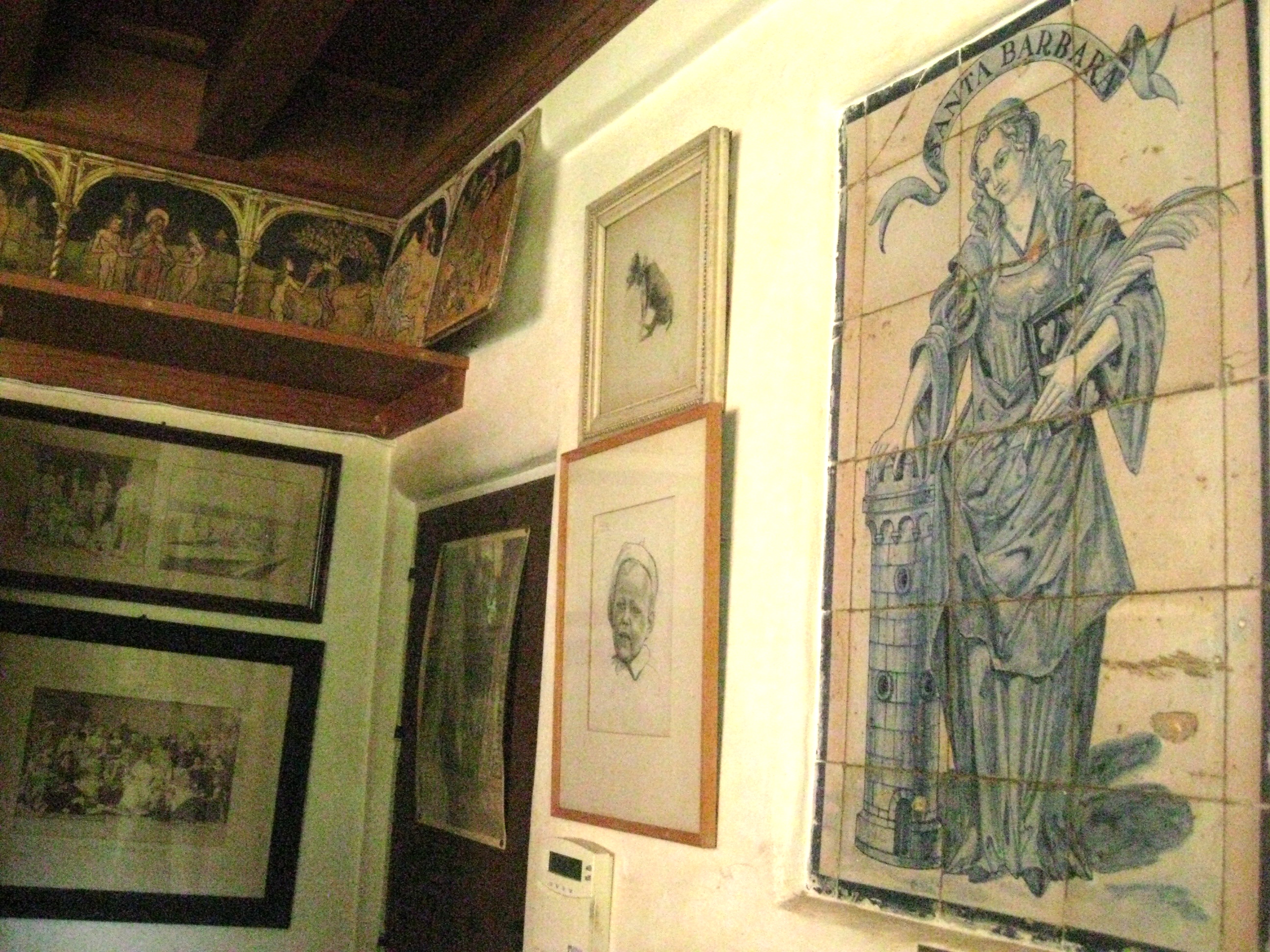

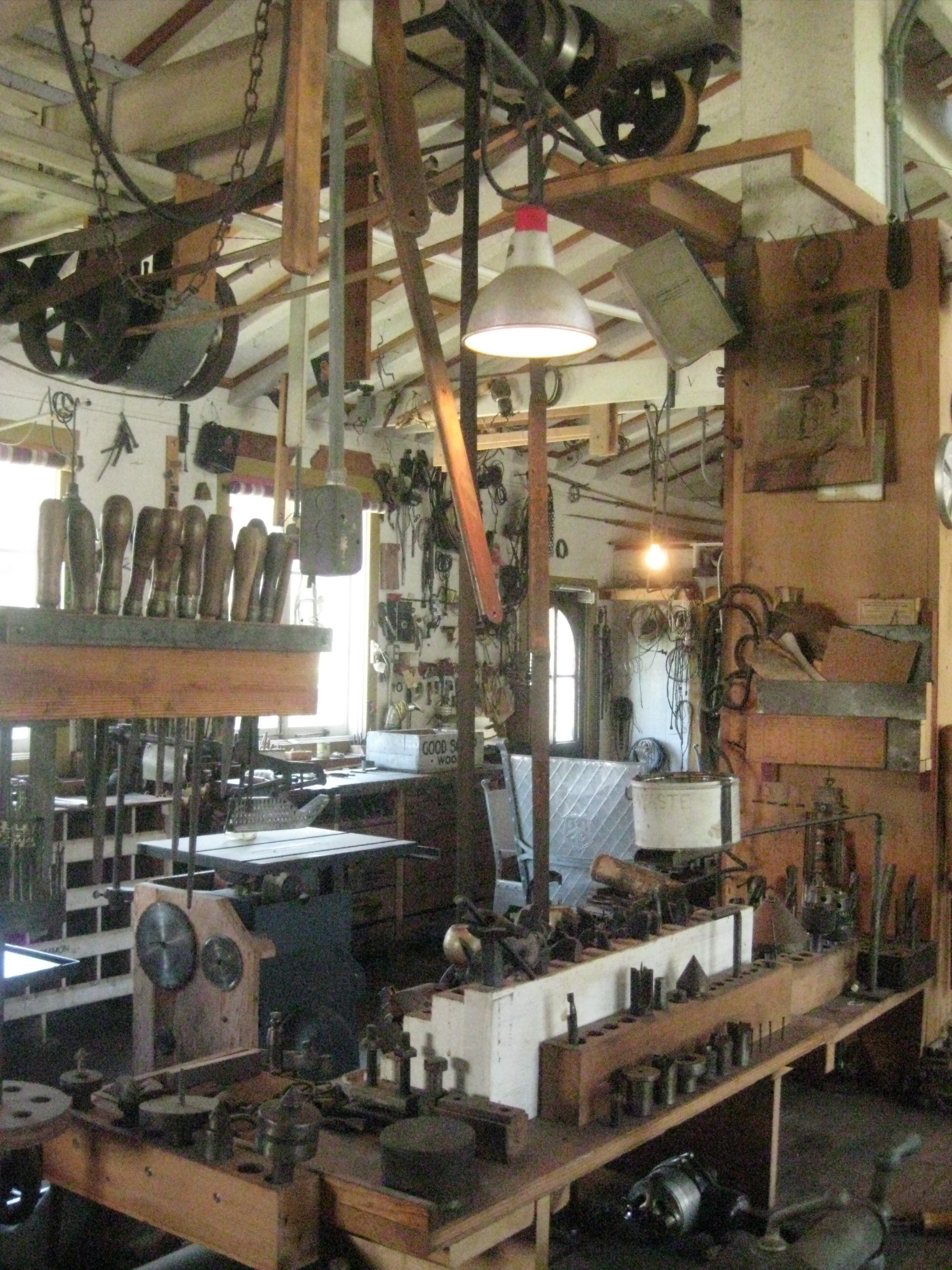

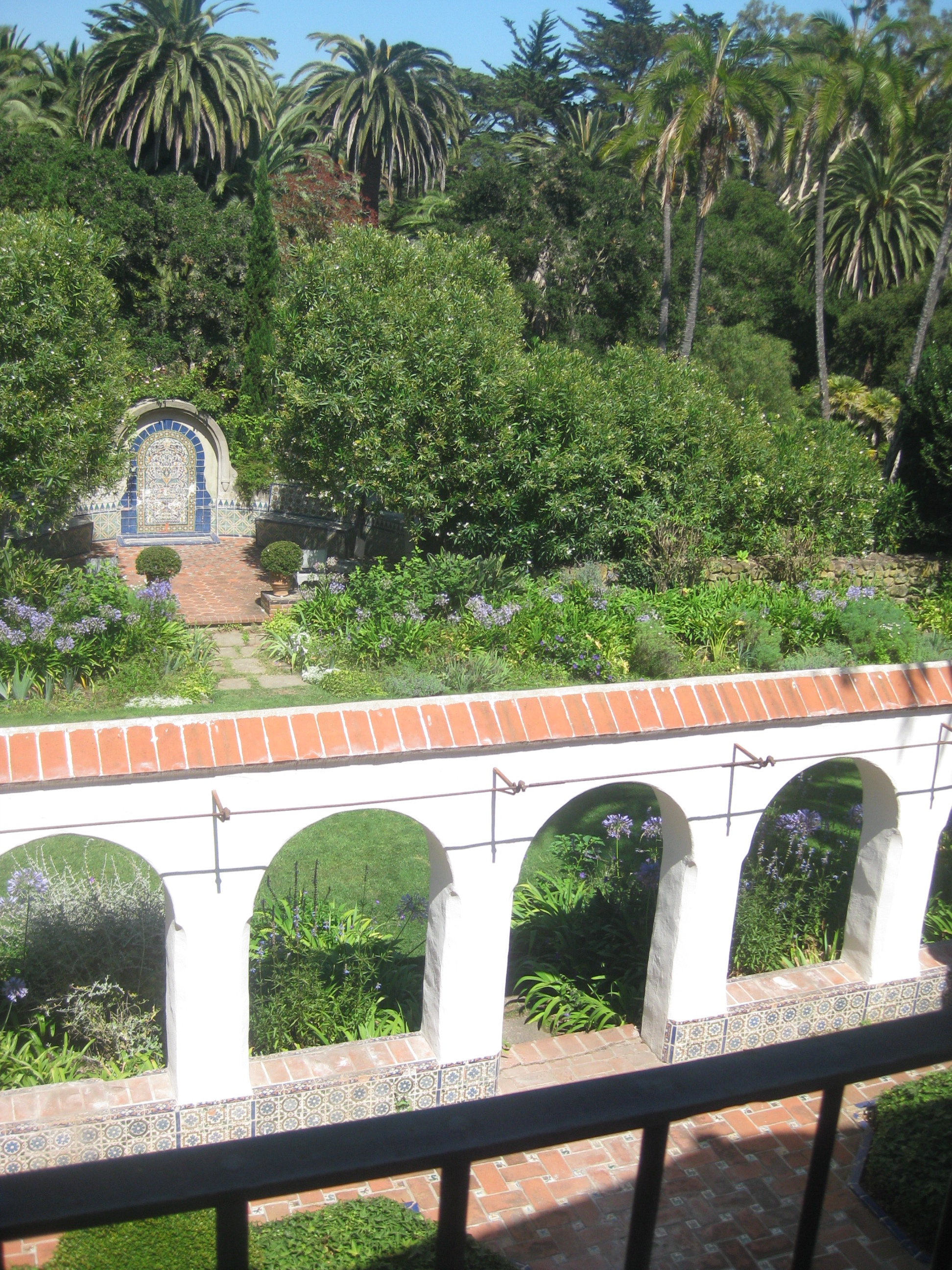

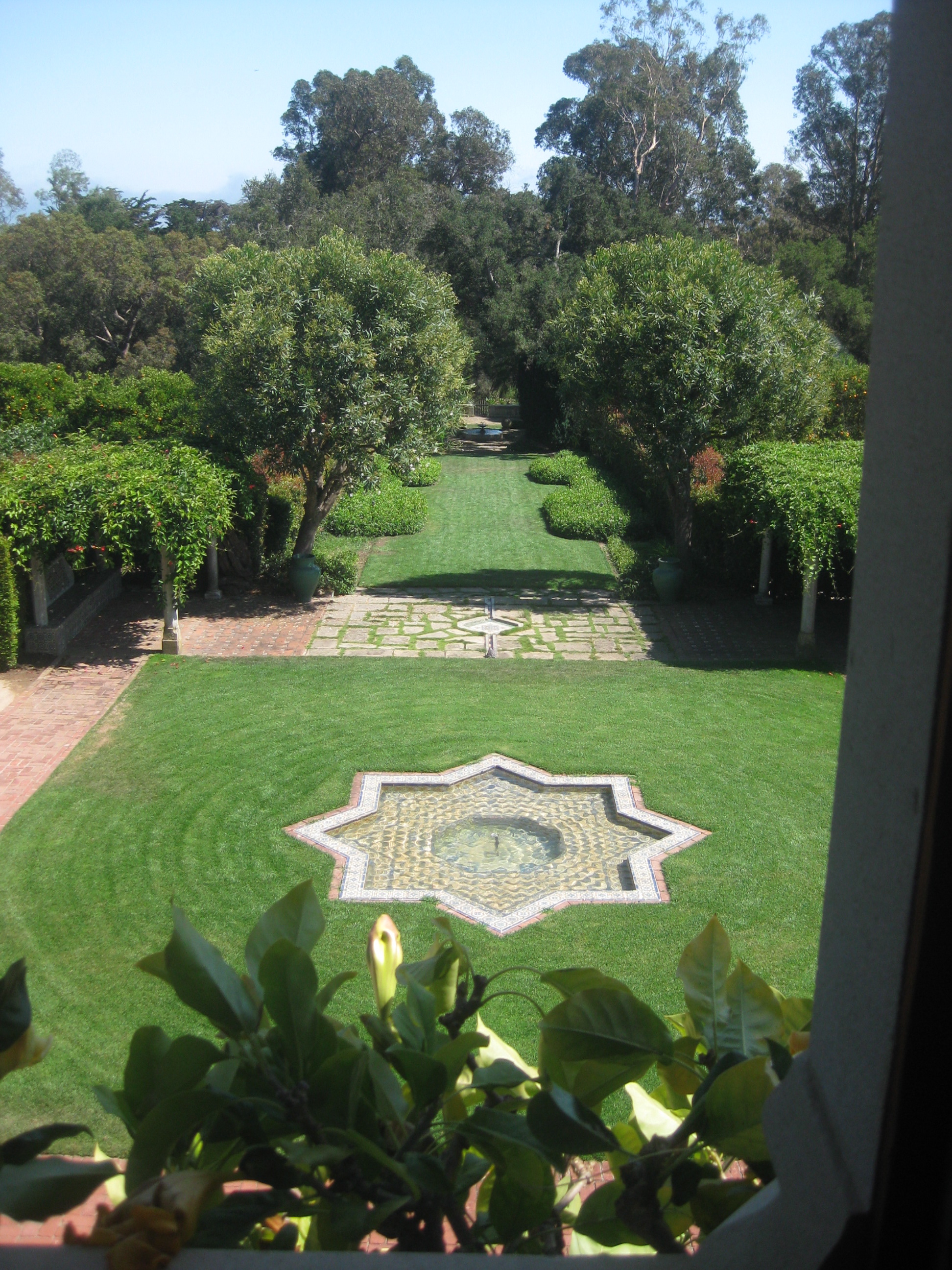

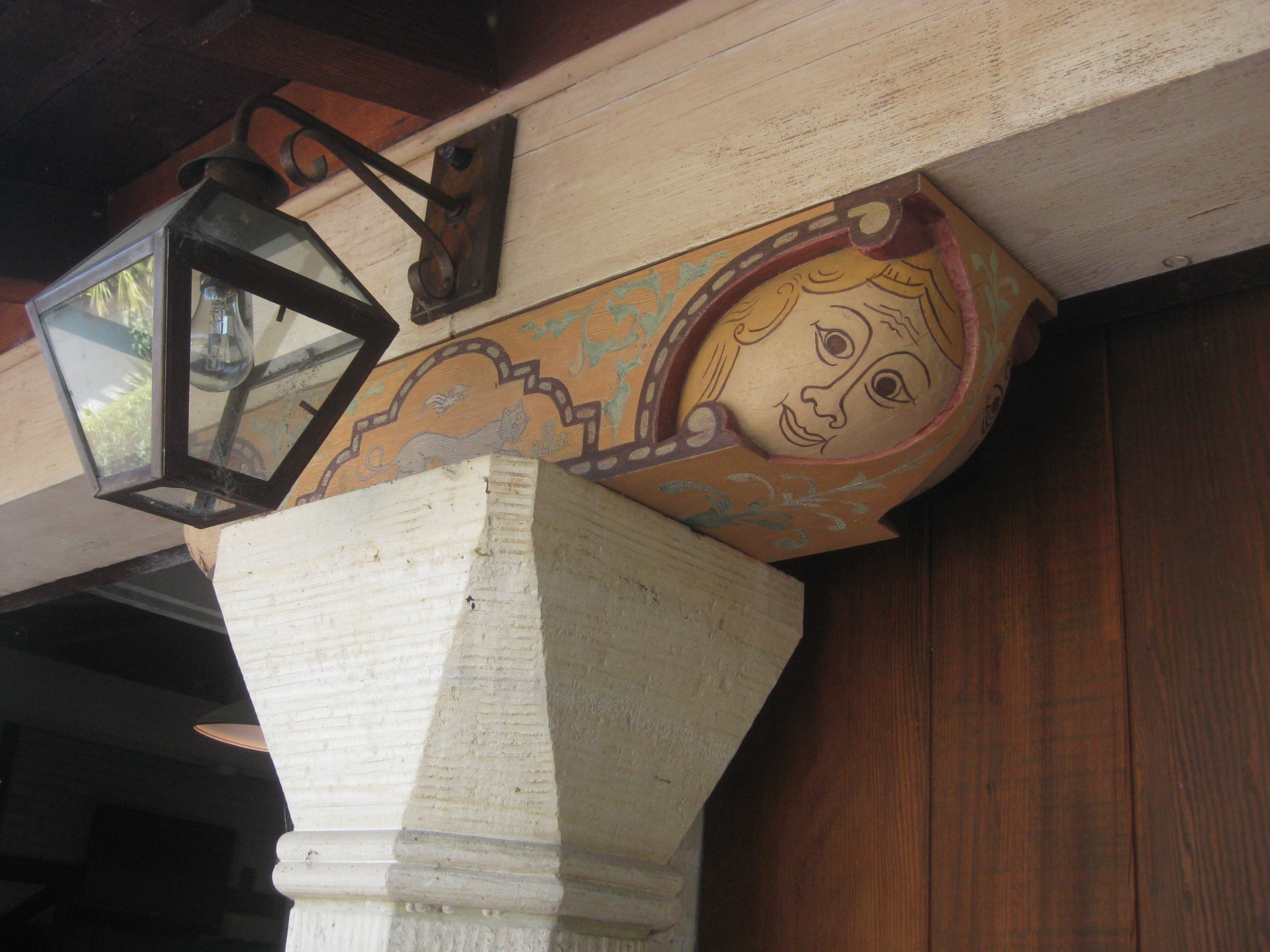

== See also ==
- History of Santa Barbara, California
- Mediterranean Revival architecture
- Spanish Colonial architecture
- Bellosguardo Foundation, another Santa Barbara mansion
