= Jackling House =

Mansion in California, US

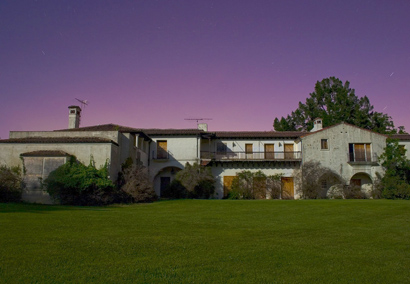
- c. 2007, with boards over its windows and doors

General information
- Status: Demolished
- Architectural style: Spanish Colonial Revival
- Location: Woodside, California, United States
- Coordinates: 37.416502°N 122.258434°W
- Named for: Daniel C. Jackling
- Opened: 1925
- Demolished: February 2011
- Owner: Steve Jobs (1984–2011)

Dimensions
- Other dimensions: 17,250 square feet (1,603 m^{2})

Technical details
- Floor count: 2
- Grounds: 6 acres (2.4 ha)

Other information
- Number of rooms: 30

The Jackling House was a mansion in Woodside, California, designed and built for copper mining magnate Daniel Cowan Jackling and his family by noted California architect George Washington Smith in 1925.

Though it was considered a historic home, it was demolished in 2011 by its last owner, Steve Jobs. Its demolition followed a protracted court battle during which Jobs stated his intentions to build a smaller, contemporary-styled home on the site, though he died before any plans could be realized.

== History ==
The Jackling House designer, George Washington Smith, was the foremost creator and proponent of the Spanish Colonial Revival architectural style that became popular in the U.S. and remains so, especially in California and the Southwest. Based in Montecito, Smith helped create Santa Barbara's unified city planning and architectural aesthetic and many significant residences in the area in the 1920s.

Daniel Jackling was a copper mining baron, and the estate represented his aesthetic values, wealth, and family needs. It contained a built in residence pipe organ, originally constructed by the Aeolian Company and later enlarged by George Kilgen and Sons. George Washington Smith integrated the 17,000 sq ft (1,600 m^{2}) residence and landscaped gardens with a large traditional courtyard, open-air balconies, and many indoor-outdoor sightline and access connections. Details about the house and its contents when Jackling lived there, including the organ, are in his collected papers in the Stanford University Library.

After Jackling's wife Virginia died in 1957, the home was sold in 1958 and its surrounding land – nearly 194 acres (79 ha) – was subdivided. The house had three other owners before its last one bought the property, which had a list price of $3.5 million, in 1984.

== Preservation issues ==
=== Background ===
In 1984, Steve Jobs purchased the Jackling House and estate, and resided there for a decade before growing to hate the building's complicated layout and unusual interior design. Jobs then leased out the property until 2000, when he stopped maintaining the house, allowing exposure to the weather to degrade it. In 2004, Jobs received demolition permission from the town of Woodside in order to build a smaller house in a more contemporary style, offering to allow the house to be moved to another property.

Local preservationists created a new group, Uphold Our Heritage (UOH), dedicated to saving the historic residence. They sued the town and Jobs, claiming that both had ignored provisions of California law which prohibit cultural landmarks from being destroyed if there are reasonable, feasible ways to preserve them. They also contended that the initial environmental impact report did not demonstrate that preserving the house would cost more than replacing it. "In addition, the town failed to demonstrate that demolishing the mansion would provide an 'overriding benefit' to the public, as required by state law", the group's attorney Doug Carstens said. "The issue before you is not to preserve and rehabilitate a work of marginal importance; it is to assure the protection and survival of a work of great significance", said the California Department of Parks and Recreation's State Historical Resources Commission chairperson Anthea Hartig, PhD.

=== Interim decisions ===
In January 2006, Superior Court Judge Marie Weiner agreed with "Uphold Our Heritage" and held that Jobs could not tear the house down. Jobs appealed to the State Court of Appeals, and in January 2007, that Court unanimously confirmed the lower court ruling. Jobs' attorney asked for an appeal but in April 2007, the Supreme Court of California refused to hear it.

In 2008, Jobs submitted a renewed permit application with updated estimates. The Woodside Town Council granted the permit a year later, in May 2009, with the condition that Jobs must allow the house to be disassembled and moved elsewhere. In February 2010, Magalli and Jason Yoho offered to move the mansion to their five-acre lot in Woodside. Magalli Yoho reported in March that the house resembled a Spanish Colonial Revival mansion she lived in as a child in Ica, Peru. She said, "This house is just a good house for our family." Woodside resident Richard Pivnicka, who had restored other historic properties, also offered to receive the home. At least some offers to move the building required Jobs to contribute financially to the cost of move, and ultimately none were agreed upon.

On March 8, 2010, Superior Court Judge Marie Weiner upheld the Woodside Town Council's 2009 decision that allowed Jobs to tear down his house. If an appeal was not filed before Jobs obtained a demolition permit, then demolition could proceed. The demolition permit process typically took "the better part of a couple of months", according to Woodside Town Manager Susan George.

On April 29, 2010, "Uphold Our Heritage" appealed the March court decision. The appeal put an "automatic stay" on the issuance of demolition permits. The group hoped that the house could be relocated and restored.

== Demolition and legacy ==
Later in 2010, Judge Weiner upheld the council's decision to allow the house to be demolished.

The pipe organ was removed in January 2011, and the entire residence was demolished the next month. Nothing was built on the site, and Jobs died later that year on October 5, 2011, of pancreatic cancer. Laurene Powell Jobs proposed a new building for the site in 2016.

The Woodside History Museum has an exhibit of furniture, maps, photographs, etc. from the Jackling House.

The town of Woodside collected 150 items from the home before it was destroyed. As of October 2018, the items were reportedly appraised at over $30,000. At a meeting that month, the town council approved a plan to offer the items – including a silver-plated teaspoon, a chandelier, wall sconces, door handles, a flagpole, and a 1920s thermostat and toilet – in sequence to the town first, and then to the owners of another Smith-designed home next door. After that, the items would be offered to the museum of the University of California, Santa Barbara, which has additional Smith designs nearby. Remaining items would then be made available to the public via silent auction before being "sent to salvage".
