= Ian Andrews (civil servant) =

British civil servant (born 1953)

Sir Ian Charles Franklin Andrews, CBE, TD (born 26 November 1953) is a British public administrator and retired civil servant.

Born on 26 November 1953, Andrews attended the University of Bristol before entered HM Civil Service in 1975 as an official in the Ministry of Defence (MoD). For his work in the MoD he was appointed a Commander of the Order of the British Empire (CBE) in the 1992 Birthday Honours. He left the MoD to serve as managing director of Facilities for the Department for Environment and Rural Affairs from 1995 to 1997. He was then Chief Executive of the Defence Estates Agency from 1998 to 2002 and returned to the MoD as Second Permanent Secretary in 2002, serving until 2008. He was knighted in the 2007 New Year Honours. From 2009 to 2013, he was the non-executive chairman of the Serious Organised Crime Agency, and from 2013 to 2018 he was a non-executive director of NHS Digital.

Government offices
| Preceded by Sir Roger Jackling | Second Permanent Secretary of the Ministry of Defence; 2002–2008 | Succeeded by Dame Ursula Brennan |
