= Moray Stewart =

British civil servant (1938–2023)

Sir James Moray Stewart, KCB (21 June 1938 – 30 December 2023) was a British civil servant.

== Biography ==
James Moray Stewart was born on 21 June 1938. He was educated at the University of Keele, and entered the civil service in 1962 as an official in the Air Ministry. Stewart served there and in its successor, the Ministry of Defence, where he was promoted to deputy secretary in 1986 and then Second Permanent Secretary in 1990, serving until 1996.

Stewart died on 30 December 2023, at the age of 85.

Government offices
Preceded by Sir Kenneth Macdonald	Second Permanent Secretary of the Ministry of Defence; 1990–1996	Succeeded by Sir Roger Jackling
