= Roger Jackling (diplomat) =

British diplomat (1913–1986)

Sir Roger William Jackling GCMG (10 May 1913 in Hythe, Kent, England – 23 November 1986 in London) was a British diplomat who was ambassador to West Germany 1968–72.

== Career ==
Roger William Jackling was born on 10 May 1913 in Hythe, Kent. He was educated at Felsted School and London University (Diploma in Public Administration). He joined the Diplomatic Service in 1939 as acting vice-consul in the British consulate in New York City. He was posted as Commercial Secretary at Quito, Ecuador, in 1942 but returned to the US in 1943, this time to the embassy at Washington, D.C. where he remained until 1947 when he was transferred to the Foreign Office in London. In 1950 he served in the Cabinet secretariat for the government of Prime Minister Clement Attlee. In 1951 he was transferred to The Hague as commercial counsellor, then in 1953 to West Germany as economic and financial adviser to the UK High Commissioner at Bonn. In May 1955 the Federal Republic of Germany was declared "fully sovereign", the High Commissioner Sir Frederick Hoyer Millar became the Ambassador, and Jackling was promoted to Economic Minister.

Jackling was posted as Counsellor at the British Embassy in Washington 1957–59, then to the Foreign Office as Assistant Under-Secretary 1959–63, then as deputy permanent UK representative to the United Nations 1963–67, with the personal rank of Ambassador from 1965 when he acted as President of the Security Council. After serving as Deputy Under-Secretary at the Foreign Office 1967–68 he returned to Bonn as Ambassador 1968–72, during which he conducted lengthy negotiations with the other allied powers, resulting in the Four Power Agreement on Berlin in September 1971. He led the UK delegation to the United Nations Conference on the Law of the Sea (UNCLOS III) from its inception in 1973 until he retired in 1976.

== Family ==
In 1938 Roger Jackling married Joan Tustin, a Canadian-born actress and journalist. They had two sons, one of which, Sir Roger Jackling, became a distinguished civil servant.

== Honours ==
Roger Jackling was appointed CMG in the New Year Honours of 1955, knighted KCMG in 1965 and promoted to GCMG on his retirement in 1976.

== Offices held ==
Diplomatic posts
Preceded by Sir Frank Roberts	Ambassador Extraordinary and Plenipotentiary at Bonn; 1968–1972	Succeeded by Sir Nicholas Henderson
