= Montecito, California =

Town in California

- Unincorporated area Census designated place
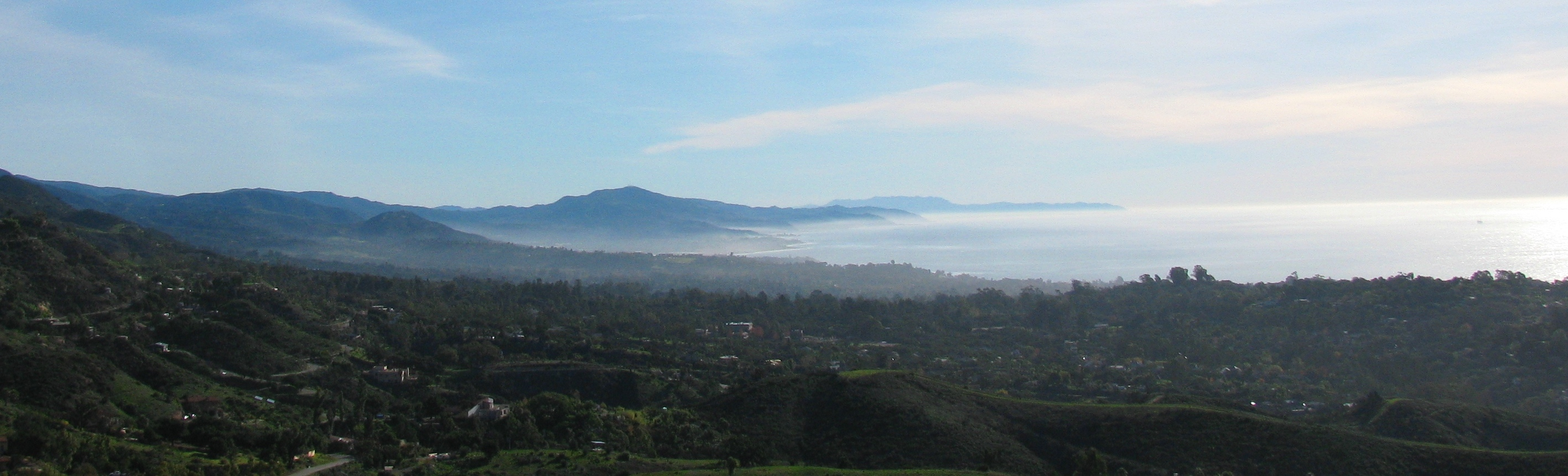
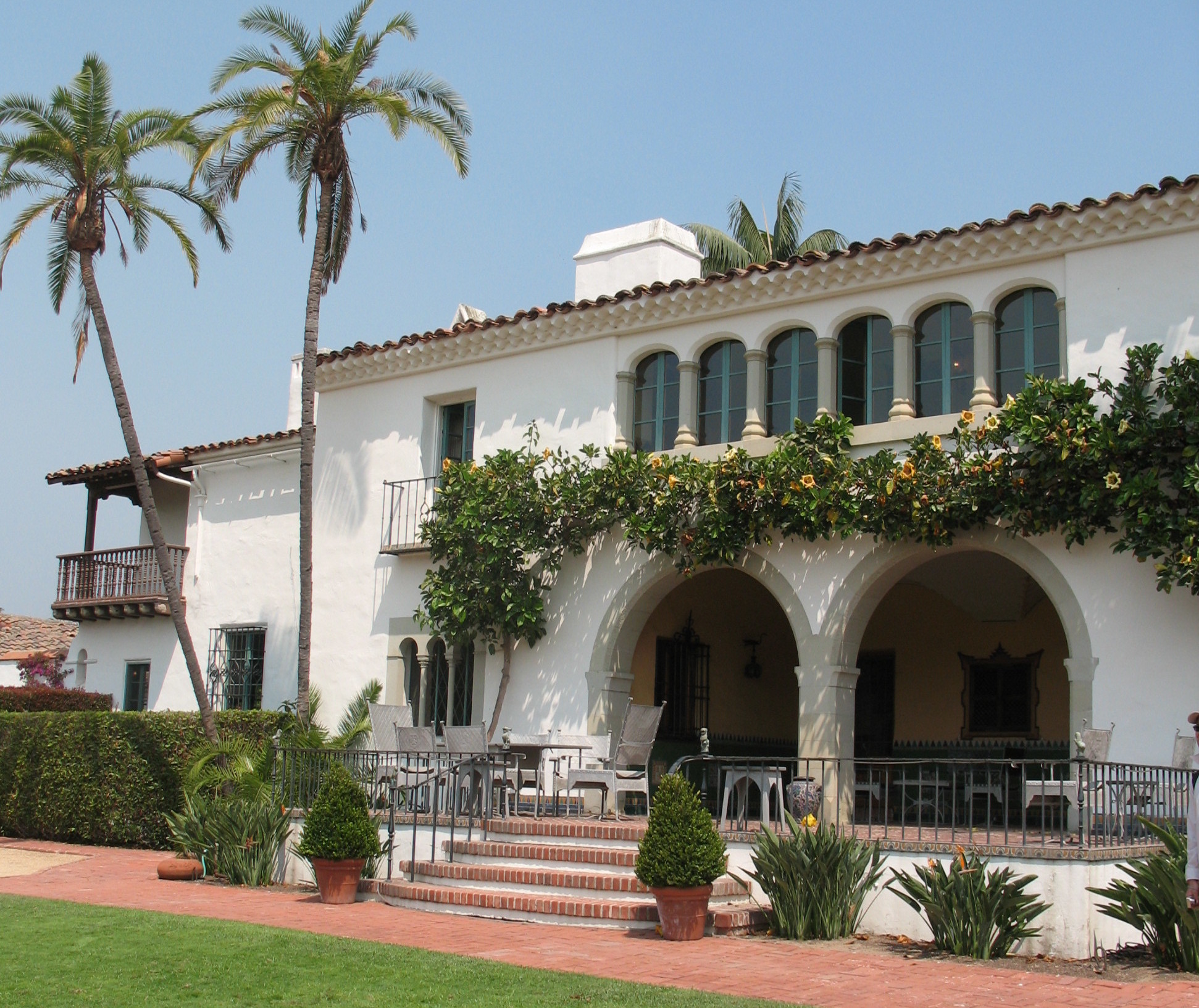
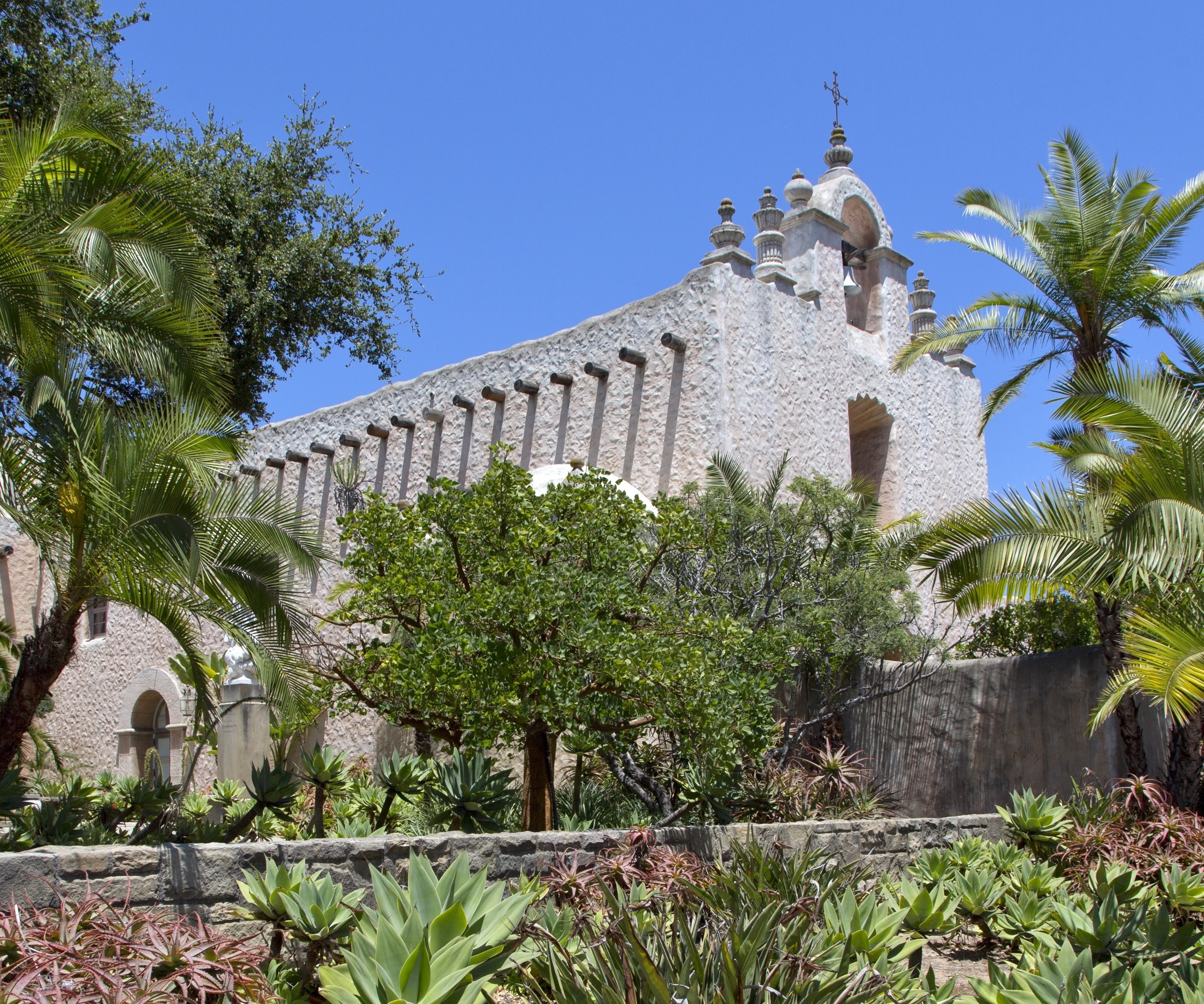
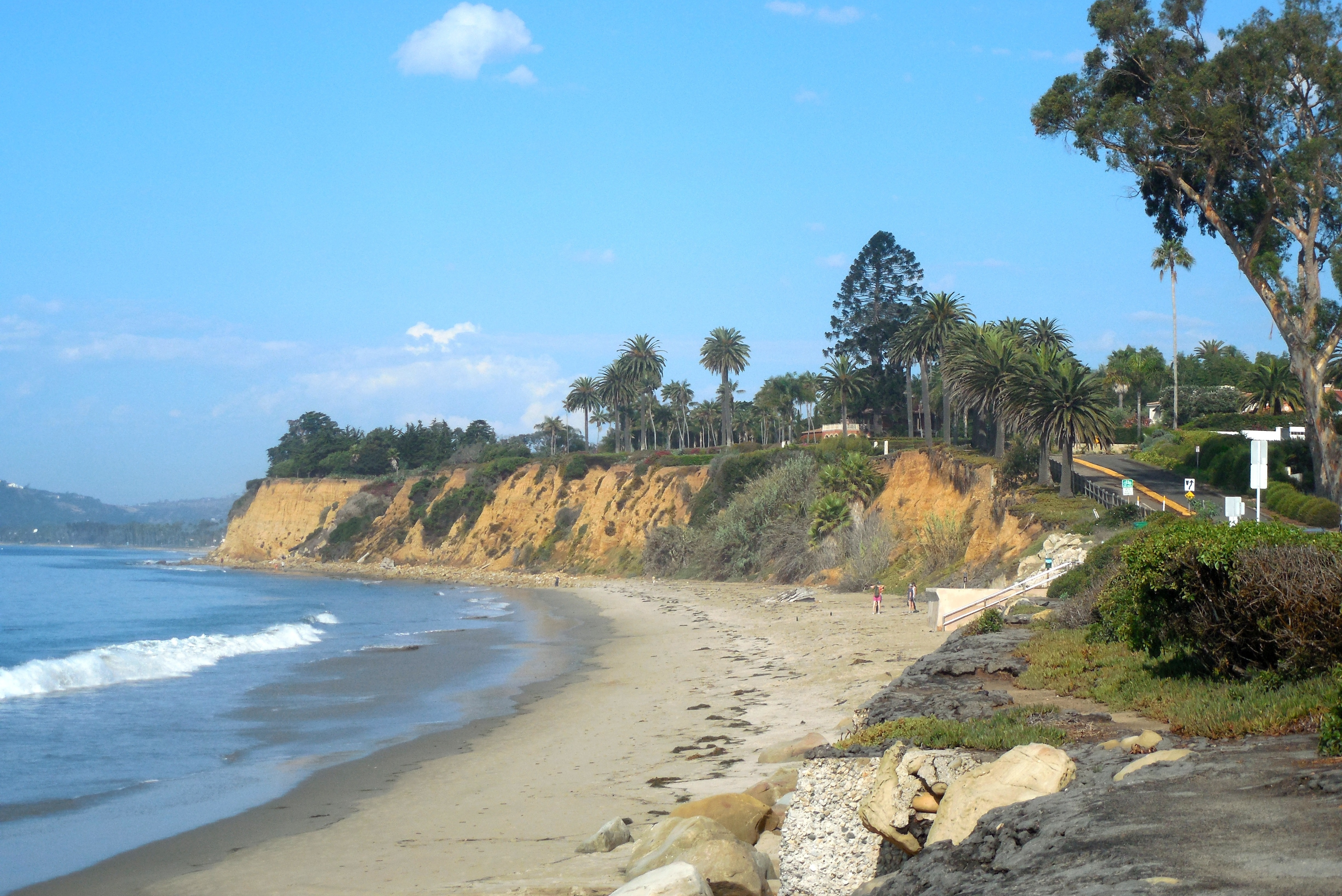
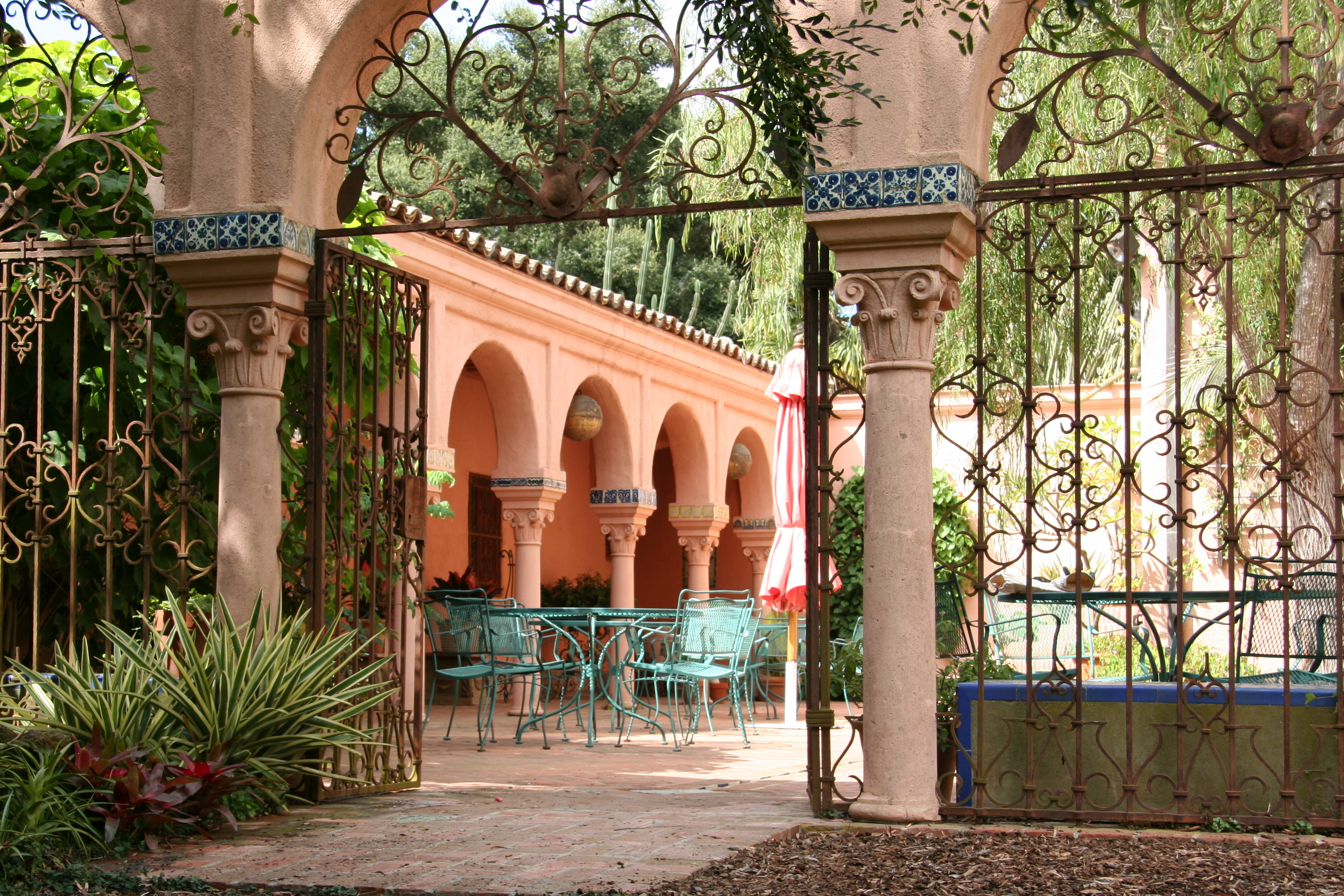
- Clockwise: view of Montecito and the Pacific Ocean from the Santa Ynez Mountains; Our Lady of Mount Carmel Church; Lotusland; Butterfly Beach; Casa del Herrero

- Location in Santa Barbara County and the state of California

- Location in the United States Montecito, California (California) Montecito, California (the United States)
- Coordinates: 34°26′N 119°38′W
- Country: United States
- State: California
- County: Santa Barbara

Government
  - State senator: Monique Limón (D)
  - Assembly Member: Gregg Hart (D)
  - U. S. rep.: Salud Carbajal (D)

Area
  - Total: 17.16 sq mi (44.44 km^{2})
  - Land: 9.18 sq mi (23.77 km^{2})
  - Water: 7.98 sq mi (20.68 km^{2}) 46.52%
- Elevation: 180 ft (55 m)

Population (April 1, 2020)
  - Total: 8,638
  - Density: 941/sq mi (363.4/km^{2})
- Time zone: UTC−8 (Pacific)
  - Summer (DST): UTC−7 (PDT)
- ZIP Codes: 93108, 93150
- Area code: 805 and 820
- FIPS code: 06-48844
- GNIS feature IDs: 1661052, 2408861

Montecito (archaic use of Spanish for woodland or countryside) is an unincorporated town in Santa Barbara County, California, United States. Located in Southern California, Montecito sits between the Santa Ynez Mountains and the Pacific Ocean. Montecito is best known for its concentration of prominent and wealthy residents. In 2024, the median home price was $7.5 million. For statistical purposes, the United States Census Bureau has defined Montecito as a census-designated place (CDP). The population as of 2022 is approximately 8,638 residents.

== History ==
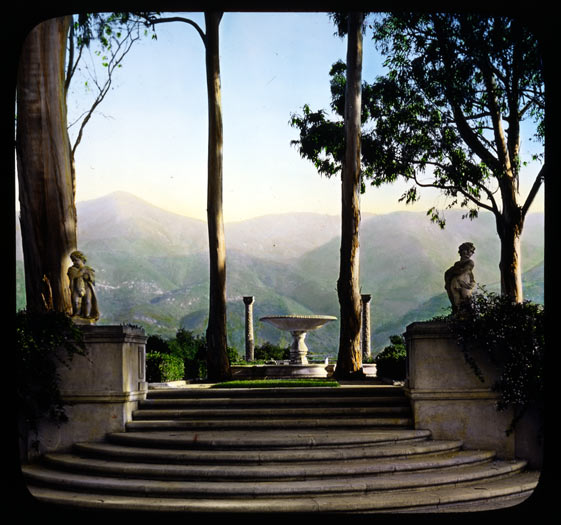
The gardens at Arcady, a Mission Revival estate built in 1905 for industrialist George Owen Knapp

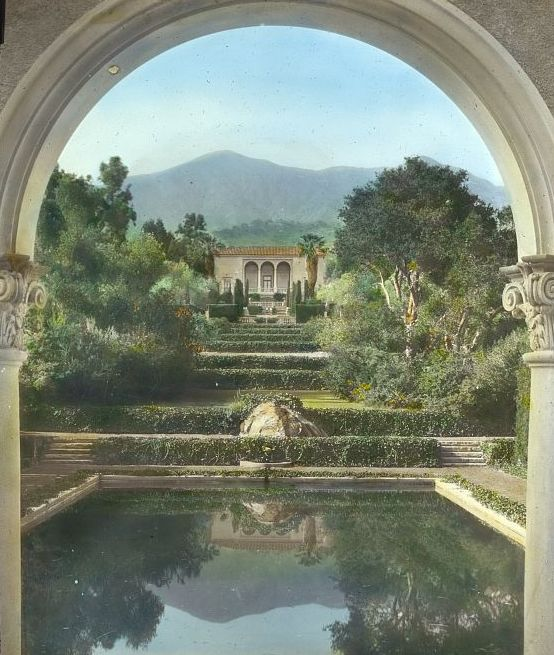
Las Tejas, a Spanish Revival estate built in 1917 by architect Francis W. Wilson for banker Oakleigh Thorne

The site of present-day Montecito, along with the entire south coast of Santa Barbara County, was inhabited for over 10,000 years by the Chumash Indians. The Spanish arrived in the 18th century but left the region largely unsettled while they built the Presidio and Mission Santa Barbara farther west.

In the middle of the 19th century, the area was known as a haven for bandits and highway robbers, who hid in the oak groves and canyons, preying on traffic on the coastal route between the towns that developed around the missions. By the end of the 1860s, the bandit gangs were gone, and Italian settlers arrived. Finding an area reminiscent of Italy, they built farms and gardens similar to those they had left behind.

Around the end of the 19th century, wealthy tourists from the eastern and midwestern United States began to buy land in the area. It was near enough to Santa Barbara for essential services while still being secluded. Desirable weather and several nearby hot springs offered the promise of comfortable, healthy living, in addition to the availability of affordable land.

The Montecito Hot Springs Hotel was built near the largest of the springs, in a canyon north of the town center and directly south of Montecito Peak, in Hot Springs Canyon. The hotel burned down in 1920; it was replaced a few years later by the smaller Hot Springs Club.

The architect George Washington Smith is noted particularly for his residences around Montecito, and for popularizing the Spanish Colonial Revival style in early 20th century America, as is Lutah Maria Riggs, who started as a draftsman in Smith's firm, rose to partner, and later started her own firm.

Montecito was evacuated five times in four months between December 2017 and March 2018 because of weather-related events, which included the Thomas Fire, the 2018 Southern California mudflows, and flooding related to the Pineapple Express. The mudflows resulted in 20 reported deaths; 28 others were injured, and at least four people were reported missing. FEMA gave the Santa Barbara County Flood Control District $13.5 million in 2020. The funds will be used to buy land in Montecito to construct an $18 million project that will help control debris flows from San Ysidro Creek with a larger debris basin.

== Geography ==
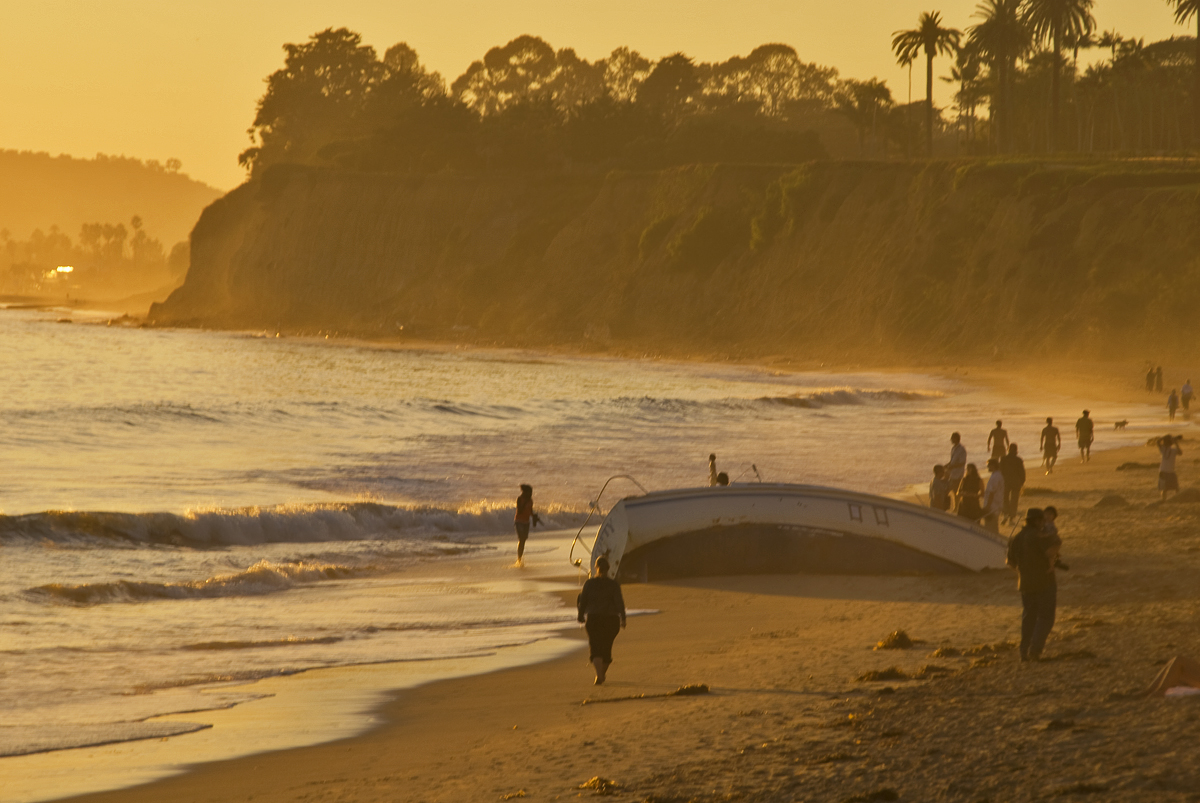
Sunset at Butterfly Beach

According to the United States Census Bureau, the CDP (census-designated place) has a land area of 9.2 square miles (24 km^{2}).

=== Climate ===
Montecito experiences a warm Mediterranean climate (Köppen climate classification: Csb) characteristic of coastal Southern California. Because of Montecito's proximity to the ocean, onshore breezes significantly moderate temperatures, resulting in warmer winters and cooler summers compared with places further inland. With its gentle Mediterranean climate, Montecito has long been a desirable location for horticulturists.

Climate data for Montecito, California
Month	Jan	Feb	Mar	Apr	May	Jun	Jul	Aug	Sep	Oct	Nov	Dec	Year
Record high °F (°C)	88 (31)	88 (31)	92 (33)	100 (38)	101 (38)	109 (43)	109 (43)	102 (39)	107 (42)	103 (39)	97 (36)	83 (28)	109 (43)
Mean daily maximum °F (°C)	64 (18)	65 (18)	66 (19)	70 (21)	70 (21)	74 (23)	77 (25)	78 (26)	77 (25)	75 (24)	70 (21)	65 (18)	71 (22)
Mean daily minimum °F (°C)	43 (6)	45 (7)	47 (8)	49 (9)	52 (11)	55 (13)	58 (14)	59 (15)	57 (14)	53 (12)	47 (8)	43 (6)	51 (11)
Record low °F (°C)	24 (−4)	25 (−4)	32 (0)	36 (2)	38 (3)	42 (6)	48 (9)	47 (8)	43 (6)	36 (2)	30 (−1)	20 (−7)	20 (−7)
Average precipitation inches (mm)	3.80 (97)	4.34 (110)	3.34 (85)	0.72 (18)	0.30 (7.6)	0.08 (2.0)	0.02 (0.51)	0.04 (1.0)	0.29 (7.4)	0.53 (13)	1.37 (35)	2.36 (60)	17.19 (437)

== Demographics ==
Historical population
Census	Pop.	Note	%±
2000	10,000		—
2010	8,965		−10.3%
2020	8,638		−3.6%
U.S. Decennial Census; 1860–1870 1880-1890; 1900 1910 1920; 1930 1940 1950; 1960 1970 1980; 1990 2000 2010; 2020

Montecito first appeared as a census designated place in the 2000 U.S. census.

=== Racial and ethnic composition ===
Montecito CDP, California – Racial and ethnic composition Note: the US Census treats Hispanic/Latino as an ethnic category. This table excludes Latinos from the racial categories and assigns them to a separate category. Hispanics/Latinos may be of any race.
Race / Ethnicity (NH = Non-Hispanic)	Pop 2000	Pop 2010	Pop 2020	% 2000	% 2010	% 2020
White alone (NH)	9,125	7,891	7,213	91.25%	88.02%	83.50%
Black or African American alone (NH)	44	46	51	0.44%	0.51%	0.59%
Native American or Alaska Native alone (NH)	16	32	28	0.16%	0.36%	0.32%
Asian alone (NH)	127	215	211	1.27%	2.40%	2.44%
Native Hawaiian or Pacific Islander alone (NH)	21	6	15	0.21%	0.07%	0.17%
Other race alone (NH)	16	15	46	0.16%	0.17%	0.53%
Mixed race or Multiracial (NH)	132	155	365	1.32%	1.73%	4.23%
Hispanic or Latino (any race)	519	605	709	5.19%	6.75%	8.21%
Total	10,000	8,965	8,638	100.00%	100.00%	100.00%

=== 2020 census ===
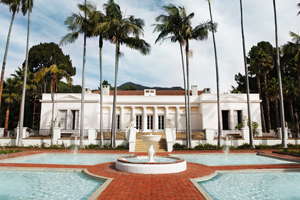
El Fureidis, designed in 1906 by architect Bertram Goodhue

The Santa Barbara Biltmore is located in Montecito.

As of the 2020 census, Montecito had a population of 8,638 and a population density of 941.3 inhabitants per square mile (363.4/km^{2}). The age distribution was 14.9% under the age of 18, 17.8% aged 18 to 24, 11.9% aged 25 to 44, 22.4% aged 45 to 64, and 32.9% aged 65 or older. The median age was 50.7 years. For every 100 females, there were 83.6 males, and for every 100 females age 18 and over there were 82.3 males.

The census reported that 86.7% of the population lived in households, 12.8% lived in non-institutionalized group quarters, and 0.5% were institutionalized. In addition, 95.9% of residents lived in urban areas while 4.1% lived in rural areas.

There were 3,157 households, of which 22.0% had children under the age of 18 living in them. Of all households, 55.1% were married-couple households, 4.0% were cohabiting couple households, 27.4% had a female householder with no partner present, and 13.5% had a male householder with no partner present. About 28.2% of households were made up of individuals, and 20.1% had someone living alone who was 65 years of age or older. The average household size was 2.37, and there were 2,070 families (65.6% of all households).

There were 4,162 housing units at an average density of 453.5 units per square mile (175.1 units/km^{2}). Of the housing units, 75.9% were occupied and 24.1% were vacant. Of occupied units, 73.0% were owner-occupied and 27.0% were occupied by renters. The homeowner vacancy rate was 2.5%, and the rental vacancy rate was 7.3%.

=== Demographic estimates ===
In 2023, the US Census Bureau estimated that 10.5% of the population were foreign-born. Of all people aged 5 or older, 87.0% spoke only English at home, 4.9% spoke Spanish, 5.5% spoke other Indo-European languages, 2.2% spoke Asian or Pacific Islander languages, and 0.4% spoke other languages. Of those aged 25 or older, 98.3% were high school graduates and 74.9% had a bachelor's degree.

=== Income and poverty ===
The median household income in 2023 was $222,966, and the per capita income was $132,404. About 7.5% of families and 7.8% of the population were below the poverty line.

=== 2010 census ===
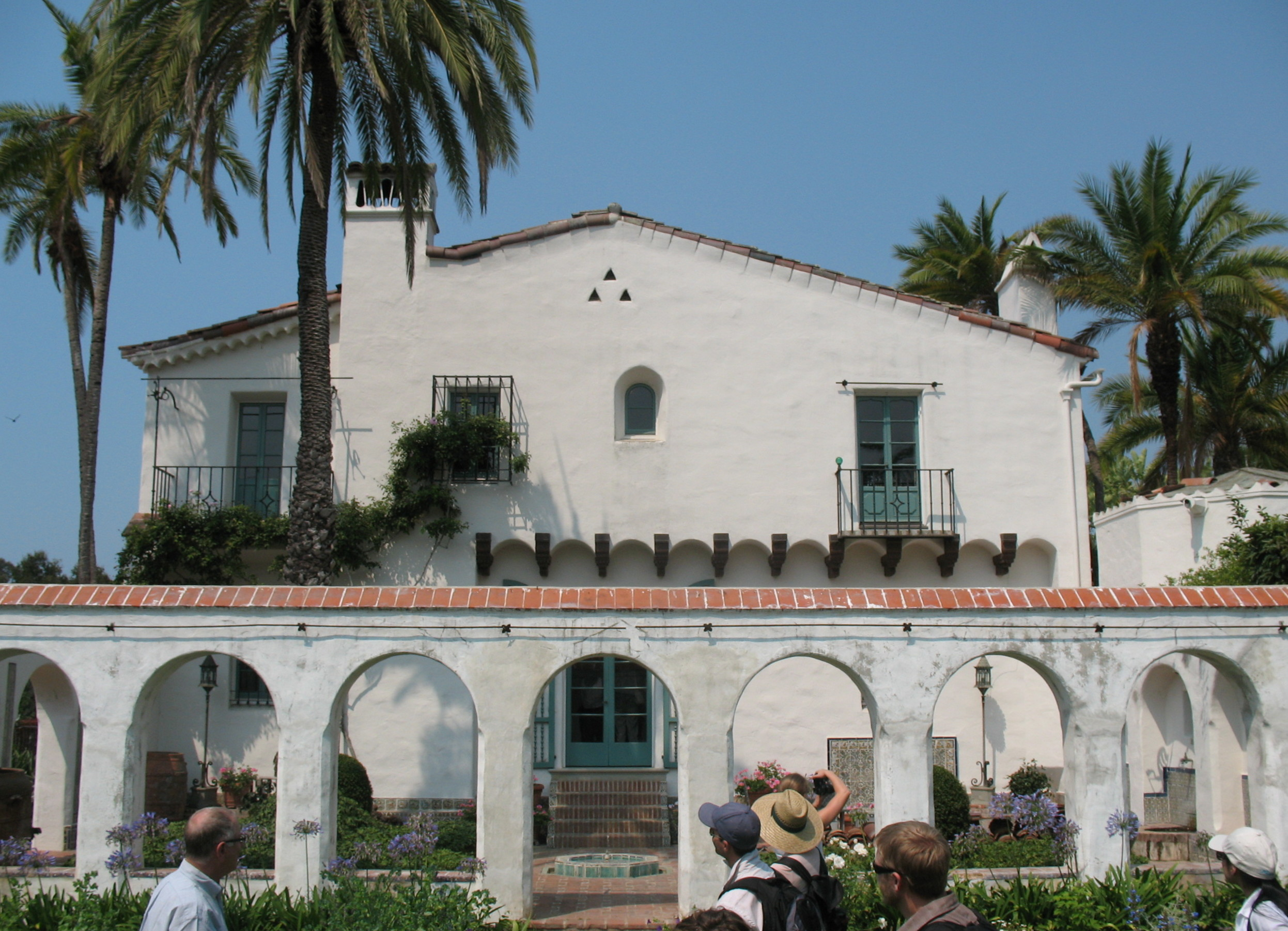
The Casa del Herrero, designed by architect George Washington Smith in 1925, is considered to be one of the finest examples of Spanish Colonial Revival architecture in California.

The 2010 United States census reported that Montecito had a population of 8,965. The population density was 967.7 inhabitants per square mile (373.6/km^{2}). The racial makeup of Montecito was 8,267 (92.2%) White, 218 (2.4%) Asian, 55 (0.6%) African American, 38 (0.4%) Native American, 6 (0.1%) Pacific Islander, 156 (1.7%) from other races, and 225 (2.5%) from two or more races. Hispanic or Latino of any race were 605 persons (6.7%).

The Census reported that 8,033 people (89.6% of the population) lived in households, 932 (10.4%) lived in non-institutionalized group quarters, and none were institutionalized.

Of the 3,432 households, 831 (24.2%) had children under the age of 18 living in them; 1,936 (56.4%) were opposite-sex married couples living together, 234 (6.8%) had a female householder with no husband present, 93 (2.7%) had a male householder with no wife present. There were 110 (3.2%) unmarried opposite-sex partnerships, and 36 (1.0%) same-sex married couples or partnerships. 941 households (27.4%) were made up of individuals, and 527 (15.4%) had someone living alone who was 65 years of age or older. The average household size was 2.34. There were 2,263 families (65.9% of all households); the average family size was 2.79.

The age spread of the population accounts 1,515 people (16.9%) under the age of 18, 1,234 people (13.8%) aged 18 to 24, 1,169 people (13.0%) aged 25 to 44, 2,716 people (30.3%) aged 45 to 64, and 2,331 people (26.0%) who were 65 years of age or older. The median age was 50.0 years. For every 100 females, there were 87.3 males. For every 100 females age 18 and over, there were 83.9 males.

4,238 housing units represented an average density of 457.5 per square mile (176.6/km^{2}), of which 2,522 (73.5%) were owner-occupied, and 910 (26.5%) were occupied by renters. The homeowner vacancy rate was 2.4%; the rental vacancy rate was 8.7%. 6,081 people (67.8% of the population) lived in owner-occupied housing units and 1,952 people (21.8%) lived in rental housing units.

== Government ==
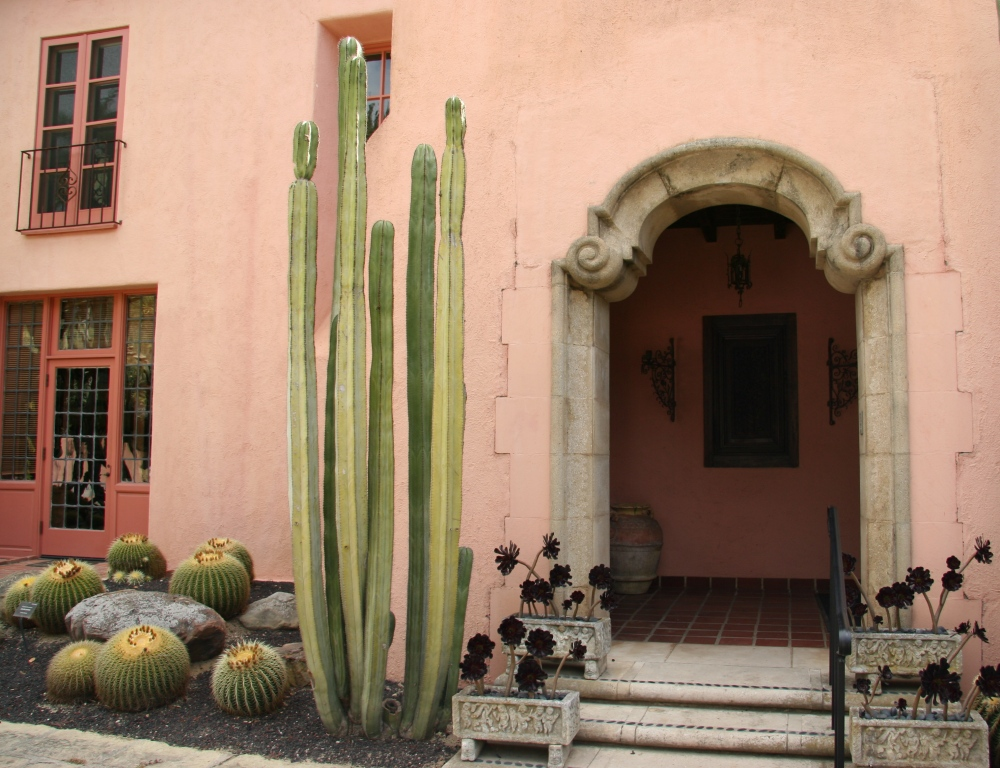
Lotusland is a botanical garden and historic estate open to the public.

As an unincorporated area of Santa Barbara County, Montecito has no city council or municipal government. Municipal services are provided by Santa Barbara County; as with the county's other unincorporated areas, Montecito's law enforcement agency is the Santa Barbara County Sheriff's Office, while traffic related law enforcement is handled by the California Highway Patrol

Montecito is part of the Santa Barbara County Supervisor District 1, which elects one supervisor to the five-member Board of Supervisors. Unlike other unincorporated areas in the county, Montecito has two government agencies which together act as its planning commission: the Montecito Board of Architectural Review and the Montecito Planning Commission. Proposals to incorporate as a municipality have been a perennially recurring feature of local politics, but has never come to fruition.

Important commercial areas such as Coast Village Road are within the city of Santa Barbara.

== Parks and recreation ==
Access to backcountry hiking trails is obtained through the community.

March and April are the months to watch gray whales migrate north from Mexico through the Santa Barbara Channel.

== Arts and culture ==
The Music Academy of the West is a summer classical music training program and festival with local performances Lotusland is a 37-acre (15 ha) estate and botanic gardens built by Polish opera singer Ganna Walska and managed as a nonprofit.

- El Fureidis – private residence designed by Bertram Grosvenor Goodhue
- Casa del Herrero – Spanish Colonial revival home and gardens – designed by George Washington Smith
- Santa Barbara Biltmore: Coral Casino Beach and Cabana Club – designed by Gardner Dailey;
- Montecito Inn, a small hotel built by Charlie Chaplin
- Santa Barbara Vedanta Temple – designed by Lutah Maria Riggs
- Our Lady of Mount Carmel Church
- George Washington Smith home and studio
- Rosewood Miramar Beach resort and Caruso's restaurant
- San Ysidro Ranch

== Education ==
Historic Monterey Revival estate designed by G.W. Smith

Children in Montecito are enrolled at Montecito Union Elementary School and Cold Spring Elementary School. Both of these K–6 schools are operated by school districts which only run one school.

Students in grades 7-12 are served by the Santa Barbara Unified School District and attend Santa Barbara Junior High School, followed by Santa Barbara High School.

The private four-year Westmont College is located in the hills above Montecito.

== Transportation ==
Notable roads spanning Montecito include East Valley Road, Mountain Drive, and Sycamore Canyon Road, all of which form part of State Route 192. In addition, the U.S. Route 101 freeway runs along the south end of town, connecting it with other cities in Santa Barbara County and the rest of Southern California.

The nearest train station with Amtrak service is Santa Barbara (SBA).

== Notable people ==
Notable current and former residents include:

- Troy Aikman
- Amanda Chantal Bacon
- William Baldwin
- Drew Barrymore
- Orlando Bloom
- T. C. Boyle
- Jeff Bridges
- John Cleese
- Robert M. Colleary (1929–2012)
- Jimmy Connors
- Larry David
- Ellen DeGeneres
- Clark Gable
- Greta Garbo
- Tipper Gore
- Sue Grafton
- Ariana Grande
- Prince Harry, Duke of Sussex and Meghan, Duchess of Sussex
- Burl Ives
- Adam Levine
- Christopher Lloyd
- Rob Lowe
- Steve Martin
- Jack Mitchell
- Lewis Nixon III
- Brad Paisley
- Jack Palance
- Gwyneth Paltrow
- Suzy Parker
- Katy Perry
- Natalie Portman
- Priscilla Presley
- Ivan Reitman
- Zoe Saldaña
- Ty Warner
- Ganna Walska (who built Lotusland)
- Owen Wilson
- Oprah Winfrey

== In popular culture ==
- 20th Century Women: 2016 film by Mike Mills
- It's Complicated: 2009 film by Nancy Myers
- An American Family: 1973 PBS documentary series. America's "first reality TV show" follows the Loud family who live on Mountain Drive. This story was revisited in the fictionalized 2011 HBO drama Cinema Verite.
- In Montecito: 1963 poem by Randall Jarrell

== See also ==
- History of Santa Barbara, California
- Shalawa Meadow, California

== Bibliography ==
- Baker, Gayle. Santa Barbara. Harbor Town Histories, Santa Barbara. 2003. ISBN 0-9710984-1-7.
