= Roger Jackling (civil servant) =

British civil servant

Sir Roger Tustin Jackling KCB CBE (born 23 November 1943) is a British retired Civil Servant who served as the first Director General of the Defence Academy of the United Kingdom.

== Career ==
Educated at Wellington College, New York University and Jesus College, Oxford, Jackling joined the Ministry of Defence in 1969. He was appointed a Fellow of the Centre for International Affairs at Harvard University in 1985 and Principal of the Civil Service College in 1986. He went on to be Deputy Under-Secretary (Resources, Programmes & Finance) and then Second Permanent Under-Secretary of State at the Ministry of Defence from 1997. He was appointed Director General of the Defence Academy of the United Kingdom on its formation in 2002.

Government offices
Preceded by Sir Moray Stewart	Second Permanent Secretary of the Ministry of Defence; 1996–2002	Succeeded by Sir Ian Andrews
Military offices
Preceded by New Post	Director General of the Defence Academy; 2002–2005	Succeeded by Sir John Kiszely
