= George Washington Smith (architect) =

American architect and painter (1876–1930)

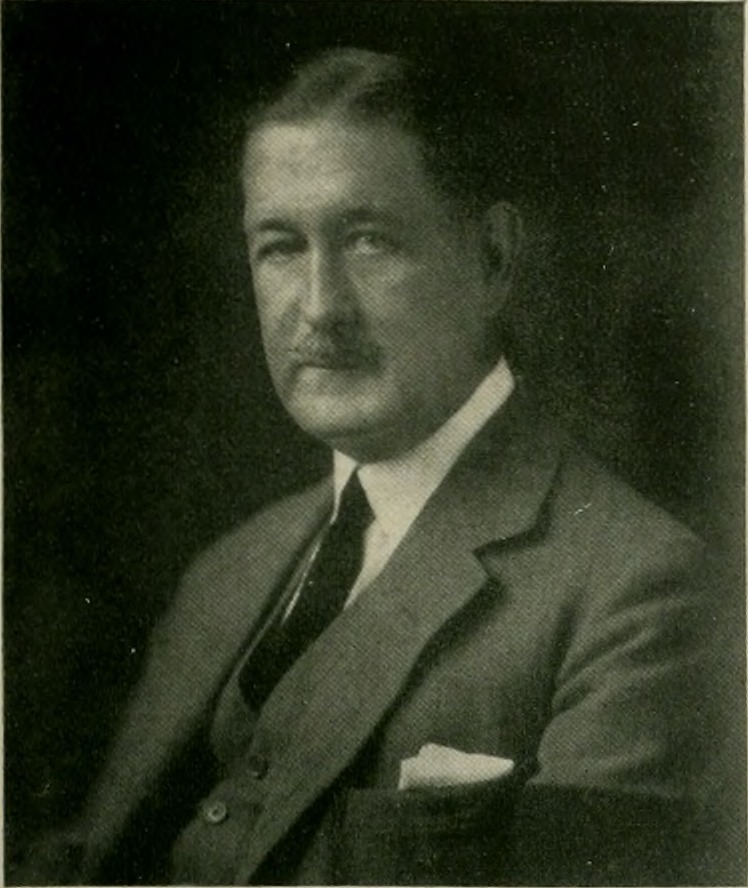
- Born: February 22, 1876; East Liberty, Pennsylvania, U.S.
- Died: March 16, 1930 (aged 54)
- Education: Pennsylvania Academy of Fine Arts; Harvard College
- Occupations: Architect and painter

George Washington Smith (February 22, 1876 – March 16, 1930) was an American architect and painter. He is known particularly for his work around Santa Barbara, California, and for popularizing the Spanish Colonial Revival style in early 20th-century America. His notable works include Casa del Herrero, the Lobero Theater, the Santa Barbara News-Press building, and buildings at the Santa Barbara Cemetery. He also designed several private houses in Montecito.

== Life ==
=== Early life, bond trading, and art career ===
George Washington Smith was born in East Liberty, Pennsylvania, in 1876 (on George Washington's birthday), the son of a prominent Pennsylvania engineer. Raised in Philadelphia, he was able to study painting at the Pennsylvania Academy of Fine Arts. Later, he attended Harvard College to study architecture, but was unable to graduate due to his family's financial difficulties. He obtained employment as a draftsman in a Philadelphia architectural firm but was unsatisfied with the lifestyle this afforded him. Smith turned to bond trading and quickly became very successful.

His success in the bond markets allowed him to quit work in 1911 to devote himself to painting and the study of art. He married Mary Catherine Greenough and the couple moved to Europe. An admirer of the works of Paul Cézanne and Paul Gauguin, Smith traveled around the continent painting landscapes, as well as studying in Rome and at the Académie Julian in Paris. The Smiths spent three years in Europe, returning to the United States at the outbreak of World War I.

Establishing himself in New York, Smith began exhibiting with other painters of the era, including John Sloan and George Bellows. His work gained notice and was soon being exhibited outside New York as well, at the Corcoran Gallery in Washington D.C., the Pennsylvania Academy of Fine Arts, and at the Art Institute of Chicago. In 1915, Smith traveled to California, where his paintings were to be on display in the Palace of Fine Arts at San Francisco's Panama Pacific Exposition.

=== Architectural career ===
While in California, Smith visited friends from Philadelphia who had relocated to Montecito, a rustic suburb of Santa Barbara. Still intending to return to Europe at the close of the war, he decided to remain in California for the duration. He purchased land in Montecito and designed and built a home and studio. He modeled the home after farmhouses he had seen in Andalusia during a trip to Spain in 1914.

The house he built in 1917, called Casa Dracaena (a.k.a. El Hogar and Heberton House), was an immediate success. Images of it were used to sell cement and tiles among other goods, and Smith quickly found that his neighbors wanted to live in houses like it. Before long he stopped painting and took up working as an architect full-time in Santa Barbara. His plans to return to Europe after the war were abandoned, and he remained in the Santa Barbara area for the remainder of his life. Before his death in 1930, Smith designed some 80 homes in Santa Barbara County alone, and worked nationwide.

In his time, Smith was one of the most popular architects in the United States, his homes appearing in leading architecture and interior design magazines. He is sometimes credited with being the "father" of the Spanish-Colonial Revival style in the United States, although he worked in other idioms as well. Despite his popularity in his era, Smith is not widely recognized today, though his homes remain popular and several are on the National Register.

His original Montecito home, as well as "Casa del Greco", his second self-designed residence next door, built in 1920, exist today as family residences. Two additional Smith designs were built in Hope Ranch in the mid-1920s: Meadow Farm for Milton Wilson, now named Robledal, and Florestal, originally built for the Peter Cooper Bryce family.

The clubhouse at Cypress Point Club on the Monterey Peninsula was designed by George Washington Smith and opened in 1929. It was decorated by Francis McComas and Frances Elkins and is mostly unchanged from the original design.

== Legacy ==
Smith's 21st Montecito house, Casa del Herrero (House of the Blacksmith), built for St. Louis industrialist George Steedman in 1922, is now a museum. Most of Smith's original sketches and drawings and much of his correspondence are held at the Architecture and Design Collection of the Art Museum at the University of California, Santa Barbara. The house is now listed on the National Register of Historic Places. The house is owned by the non-profit Casa del Herrero foundation, and can be visited by appointment. Also listed on the National Register is Santa Barbara's Lobero Theater, completely rebuilt to Smith's design in 1924.

=== Jackling House deconstruction ===
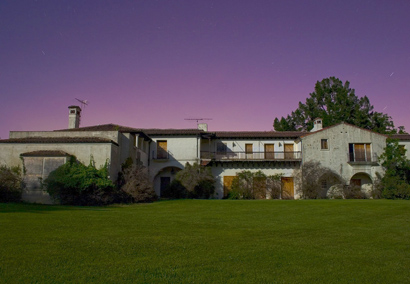
The Daniel C. Jackling house in its prior state (photo courtesy terrastories.com)

Smith's name returned to public view in the 2000s after Apple Inc. founder Steve Jobs purchased a George Washington Smith home in Woodside, California. Jobs purchased the 1925 Jackling House in 1984, and generated an uproar after winning approval from the Woodside city council to tear the house down in 2004. That decision was overturned in 2006. Jobs appealed the court decision to the California State Court of Appeals, but that court agreed with the lower court ruling in 2007. Jobs, who has described the house as "poorly built", "[not]...very interesting", and in poor taste, was granted a demolition permit in May 2009 by the Woodside Town Council, with the condition that he allow investor Gordon Smythe to disassemble the building and move it to another location. Smythe intends to live in it with his wife and young children. On Valentine's Day, 2011, deconstruction commenced on the Jackling House. Jobs died of pancreatic cancer on October 5, 2011, and never completed the proposed replacement building.

== Selected works ==
These works are listed with photographs and brief descriptions in Andree and Young, Santa Barbara Architecture. Smith primarily designed houses in the wealthy enclave of Montecito, with some commercial buildings in Santa Barbara, and a few projects in Carpinteria and Hope Ranch. Addresses are in Santa Barbara unless otherwise listed.

=== Commercial and institutional buildings ===
These buildings were all designed in a Spanish Colonial Revival style.

- General Offices, 22 W. Micheltorena, 1926
- Lobero Theater, 33 E. Canon Perdido, 1922–24
- Santa Barbara Cemetery Buildings, E. Cabrillo, 1924–25
- Clubhouses, 27 E. Carrillo, 1926
- Santa Barbara News-Press Building, De La Guerra Plaza, 1924
- Meridian Court, 112–116 De La Guerra, 1923

=== Spanish Colonial Revival houses ===
- Smith-Heberton House "El Hogar", Montecito, 1916
- Smith House "Casa del Greco", Montecito, 1920
- Parshall House, "Quatros Vistos", 1920
- Wright House, 1919 Las Tunas Road, 1921
- Courtney House, "Ravenscroft", Montecito, 1922
- Burke House, 1829 Mission Ridge, 1922–23
- Frothingham House, 232 E. Los Olivos, 1922
- Jackling House, Woodside, 1925
- Cunningham House, Montecito, 1925
- Eichheim House, Montecito, 1922–25
- Steedman House, "Casa del Herrero", 1922–25
- Casserly House, Montecito, 1925
- Douglas House, "Los Suenos", Montecito, 1928–29
- Isham Beachhouse, Carpinteria, 1927
- Bryce House, Hope Ranch, 1926
- "Stonycroft," 2151 Mission Ridge Road, 1925

=== Medieval English and French houses ===
- S. R. Wagner House, "Ty-Gwyn", Montecito, 1925
- Wagner House, Montecito, 1923
- Gladwin House, Montecito, 1923
- Cudahy House, Montecito, 1928–29
- Cudahy Estate Garage, Montecito, 1928–29
- Second Canby House, Montecito, 1928
- Stark House, 1709 Overlook Lane, 1926

=== Mediterranean houses ===
- Stewart House, "Il Brolino", Montecito, 1923

=== Italian houses ===
- Johnson-Donohue House, "La Toscana, 1927–28

== Sources ==
- Pacific Coast Architecture Database

=== Bibliography ===
- Andree, Herb, and Noel Young. Santa Barbara Architecture: from Spanish Colonial to Modern. Second edition. With photographs by Wayne McCall and an introduction by David Gebhard. Santa Barbara: Capra Press, 1980.
- Gebhard, David. "Founding Father: George Washington Smith". Santa Barbara Magazine. Archived from the original on April 27, 2007.
- Gebhard, Patricia. George Washington Smith: Architect of the Spanish-Colonial Revival, Gibbs Smith, 2005. ISBN 1-58685-510-7
- Guglielmo, Connie. Bloomberg.com, February 27, 2006. Apple's Jobs Fights Preservationists Who Want to Save His House
- Hewitt, Mark Alan. The Architect and the American Country House. New Haven and London: Yale University Press. 1990.
- Herold, Ann. The Los Angeles Times, February 2, 2006. One Spanish Colonial Revival Architect Launched California Style
- Leigh, Patricia. The New York Times, July 24, 2004. The battle to preserve the house that Steve Jobs bought: Apple chief wants to tear down this 'abomination'
- Serratore, Angela. Preservation Magazine, May 7, 2009. Group Fights Steve Jobs to Save California Mansion
