= Interrupted Melody =

1955 film by Curtis Bernhardt

- Film poster
- Directed by: Curtis Bernhardt
- Screenplay by: Sonya Levien; William Ludwig
- Based on: Interrupted Melody; 1949 book by Marjorie Lawrence
- Produced by: Jack Cummings
- Starring: Eleanor Parker; Glenn Ford; Roger Moore; Cecil Kellaway
- Cinematography: Joseph Ruttenberg; Paul C. Vogel
- Edited by: John D. Dunning
- Music by: Alexander Courage; Adolph Deutsch
- Distributed by: Metro-Goldwyn-Mayer
- Release date: March 25, 1955 (United States)
- Running time: 106 minutes
- Country: United States
- Language: English
- Budget: $2,367,000
- Box office: $4,028,000

Interrupted Melody is a 1955 American musical biopic film about the opera singer Marjorie Lawrence starring Eleanor Parker, Glenn Ford, Roger Moore, and Cecil Kellaway. Directed by Curtis Bernhardt, it was filmed in CinemaScope and Eastman Color, and produced for Metro-Goldwyn-Mayer by Jack Cummings. With an Oscar-winning screenplay by Lawrence, Sonya Levien, and William Ludwig, the operatic sequences were staged by Vladimir Rosing, and Eileen Farrell provided the singing voice for Parker. It tells the story of Australian soprano Marjorie Lawrence's rise to fame as an opera singer and her subsequent triumph over polio with her husband's help.

== Plot ==
Early one morning, Marjorie Lawrence leaves her family sheep farm in Winchelsea, Australia to catch a train and attend an operatic singing competition in Geelong. The next morning, Marjorie's father Bill learns from the newspaper she had won the competition. She arrives in Paris on a music scholarship, and is tutored by Mme. Cécile Gilly. Shortly after, Marjorie receives a telegram from her brother Cyril that her father has died. Grief-stricken, Marjorie considers returning home, but Gilly notifies her that she has been selected to play Musetta in a production of La bohème in Monte Carlo. Her debut performance receives acclaim, and she is given a two-year contract.

Marjorie telephones her family of her success, and meets Dr. Thomas King at a hotel. They celebrate with champagne, but Thomas tells her he is to return to the United States to work at a children's hospital after completing his research at the Sorbonne. As Marjorie continues to make successful performances, she appoints Cyril as her business manager, and meets Comte Claude des Vignaux. She is then directed by Leopold Sachse in a production of Richard Wagner's Götterdämmerung at the Metropolitan Opera.

Unbeknownst to her, Thomas attends her performance and they reconnect backstage though Marjorie does not recognize him at first. When she does, Thomas congratulates her and states he now works in obstetrics. Meanwhile, Cyril confronts her sister about not answering Comte Claude's calls. As she is in love with Thomas, Marjorie arrives in his office to resume their romance, though Thomas declines to marry her because of their career paths. When Thomas leaves the hospital, Marjorie tells him she has cancelled her future performances and desires to be his wife. They marry, and Marjorie jeopardizes her career with the Met Opera when she refuses to tour in South America. Thomas insists that she go on tour, but refuses to accompany her so he is not overshadowed by her.

During rehearsals for Tristan und Isolde, Marjorie's voice wavers and she collapses. Thomas flies down, and learns Marjorie has been diagnosed with polio. She recovers the use of her arms and shoulders, and Thomas takes her to Florida to recuperate. Back at home, Thomas plays one of Marjorie's phonographic records to lift her spirits, which prompts her to crawl on the floor to turn it off. Over time, an immobilized Marjorie regains the strength of her voice and soon lands an engagement with the Florida Philharmonic Opera. Backstage, she panics and tries to leave when it is time to perform.

The next morning, Marjorie learns that Thomas has sold his medical equipment and attempts to overdose on prescription pills until Thomas arrives and stops her. Marjorie convinces Thomas to return to New York while she stays behind in Florida. Thomas's friend Ed Ryson invites Marjorie to sing for soldiers at an army hospital, where she performs "Over the Rainbow". Marjorie is then invited to perform for U.S. soldiers overseas, and returns to the Met Opera which has been accommodated for her disability.

On the opening night, Marjorie performs Tristan und Isolde with the assistance of leg braces underneath her costume. During the performance, Thomas watches her from the stage wing. At the end of the opera, Marjorie receives a thundering ovation.

== Cast ==
- Glenn Ford as Dr. Thomas King
- Eleanor Parker as Marjorie Lawrence
- Roger Moore as Cyril Lawrence
- Cecil Kellaway as Bill Lawrence
- Peter Leeds as Dr. Ed Ryson
- Evelyn Ellis as Clara
- Walter Baldwin as Jim Owens
- Ann Codee as Mme. Cécile Gilly
- Leopold Sachse as himself
- Stephen Bekassy as Comte Claude des Vignaux

== Production ==
=== Development ===
In 1947, it was reported that Marjorie Lawrence was writing her memoirs, titled Interrupted Melody, and that she wanted Greer Garson to play her in a film. The book was published in 1950. The Chicago Tribune called it "engrossing".

In June 1951, MGM, which had just had a huge success with The Great Caruso, another biopic of an opera star, announced that it had bought the screen rights to the book. Jack Cummings was going to produce, and Kathryn Grayson was a possible star. Other possible leads were Greer Garson and Deborah Kerr, who would use Lawrence's voice. Lawrence flew to Hollywood in July to have discussions with Cummings and Sonya Levien, who was to do the script. In December, MGM announced Lana Turner would play the lead with filming to begin in February. However, filming did not proceed. In July 1952, MGM said Garson would be playing the lead and William Ludwig was working on the script. By February 1953, the studio had postponed production again. In December 1953, the film was put back on MGM's schedule with Garson still attached.

On April 7, 1954, The New York Times announced that Eleanor Parker would play the part because all the other candidates, with the exception of Lana Turner, had left MGM. The article reported that Lawrence had recorded the songs for the film. Filming started in September 1954. According to Parker, the filmmakers could not use Marjorie Lawrence's voice, because she had lost her upper register. Parker could read music and had a firm soprano voice with perfect pitch. She prepared for the singing aspect of her role by listening to the numbers for weeks, and she sang them during the filming in full voice instead of lip-synching. The singing was dubbed by Eileen Farrell, who appears on screen early in the film, as a student struggling to hit a high note in a scene with the singing teacher Mme. Gilly (Ann Codee) .

Glenn Ford would only appear in the film if he got top billing. Parker says: "I wanted to do what was right for the picture, so I said: 'Let him have the top billing.' Glenn was a kind of a difficult man, but he was right for the picture and a very fine actor."

A key supporting role was given to Roger Moore, who had just made The Last Time I Saw Paris for MGM and had been put under contract to the studio. The cast included Cecil Kellaway, who had lived for many years in Australia, and it was one of the few times he played an Australian during his Hollywood career.

Filming had finished by November 1954. The film was previewed in January 1955.

In February 1955, The New York Times published a photo spread showing scenes from the film.

== Reception ==
According to MGM records, the film cost $2,367,000 to produce, and made $1,801,000 in the US and Canada and $2,227,000 overseas.

In a contemporary review of the film in The New York Times, critic Bosley Crowther described it as "tender and moving," "a stirring drama, plus a handsome and melodious one," and "a tale of personal triumph and recovery that is rendered the more eloquent and taut by the ample production of gorgeous music." Film critic Derek Winnert wrote in 2013 that the film "is still an extremely enjoyable old-style heart-lifter and spirit-raiser. It is Parker’s show all the way but Glenn Ford is on top form too as the husband," and noted that "Eileen Farrell performs Parker’s vocals in eight beautiful arias – from Verdi, Puccini, Richard Wagner and Bizet’s Carmen. Amusingly, Farrell [also] plays a singing student of Mme Gilly (Ann Codee) who cannot seem to hit the right notes."

== Awards and nominations ==
Award	Category	Nominee(s)	Result	Ref.
Academy Awards	Best Actress	Eleanor Parker	Nominated	
Academy Awards	Best Story and Screenplay	William Ludwig and Sonya Levien	Won	
Academy Awards	Best Costume Design – Color	Helen Rose	Nominated	
Venice International Film Festival	Golden Lion	Curtis Bernhardt	Nominated	

== Musical tracks ==
Walter Ducloux conducted the MGM Studio Symphony Orchestra. MGM published a selection of eleven numbers on an original motion picture soundtrack album.

- "O don fatale" from Verdi's Don Carlos
- Act 1 finale from Verdi's Il trovatore
- "Un bel dì" from Puccini's Madama Butterfly
- "Habanera" from Bizet's Carmen
- "Seguidilla" from Carmen
- "Mon cœur s'ouvre à ta voix" from Saint-Saëns' Samson and Delilah
- Brünnhilde's Immolation Scene from Wagner's Götterdämmerung
- Excerpts from Wagner's Tristan und Isolde
- "Annie Laurie" by Alicia Scott
- "Over the Rainbow" by Harold Arlen
- "Voi che sapete" from Mozart's The Marriage of Figaro
- Medley: "Anchors Aweigh" by Charles A. Zimmermann; "Marines' Hymn", based on works by Jacques Offenbach; "Don't Sit Under the Apple Tree" by Sam H. Stept
- "Quando me'n vo'" (Musetta's Waltz) from Puccini's La bohème
- "Waltzing Matilda", traditional

== See also ==
- List of American films of 1955
