= Renée Gilly =

French operatic mezzo-soprano

- Born: 29 April 1906; Paris, France
- Died: 31 March 1977 (aged 70); Paris, France
- Occupations: Operatic mezzo-soprano; Academic teacher
- Spouse: Louis Musy
- Parent(s): Dinh Gilly, Cécile Gilly

Renée Gilly (19 April 1906 – 31 March 1977) was a French operatic mezzo-soprano. She was a long-time principal member of the Opéra-Comique, where she performed leading roles such as Massenet's Charlotte, Mascagni's Santuzza, and Bizet's Carmen. She appeared in world premieres and sang as a guest at major opera houses in Europe.

== Career ==
Gilly was born in Paris, the daughter of baritone Dinh Gilly and mezzo-soprano Cécile Gilly. At the age of four, she began piano studies with Marguerite Long. In 1922, at the age of 16, she undertook a series of piano recitals in England. She also served as an accompanist to her father, who participated in a series of conferences concerning singing. At the suggestion of Pierre-Barthélemy Gheusi (later director of the Opéra-Comique), she took up singing, studying with both her father and her mother.

She made her debut at the Opéra-Comique in the role of Charlotte in Massenet's Werther on 16 September 1933 and became one of the company's central performers. Among her roles there were Bizet's Carmen, Santuzza in Mascagni's Cavalleria rusticana, Toinette in Xavier Leroux's Le Chemineau, Dulcinée in Massenet's Don Quichotte, Jacqueline in Gounod's Le médecin malgré lui, the mother in Charpentier's Louise, the title role in Mignon by Ambroise Thomas, Geneviève in Debussy's Pelléas et Mélisande, Panttasilée in Xavier Leroux's La reine Fiammette, Rosette in Massenet's Manon, Margared in Lalo's Le roi d'Ys, the title role in Puccini's Tosca, Salud in de Falla's La vida breve, and Poppée in a French-language version of Monteverdi's L'incoronazione di Poppea.

She participated in six world premieres, among them Magdeleine in Antoine Mariotte's Gargantua, Ninon in Hector Fraggi's (1882–1944) A quoi rêvent les jeunes filles (1935), and the title role in Darius Milhaud's Esther de Carpentras.

She made her debut with the Paris Opera at the Palais Garnier on 13 October 1936 in the title role of Massenet's Hérodiade. As part of that company she also sang Ortrud in Wagner's Lohengrin, Brünhilde in Die Walküre, Marguerite in La damnation de Faust by Berlioz, Margared in Le Roi d'Ys and Marina in Mussorgsky's Boris Godunov. She appeared as a guest in Belgium, at the Royal Opera House in London, and in the Netherlands, Hungary, Monte Carlo, North Africa, Romania, and Switzerland.

She had a powerful voice with exceptional musicality and an excellent technique. Having trained as a pianist, she functioned as an accompanist for her mother's lessons with students. Richard Davis noted that Marjorie Lawrence was surprised to discover that the person accompanying her during Cécile Gilly's lessons was her daughter, who then became the teacher responsible for teaching Lawrence actual roles.

On her retirement from the stage in 1951, she became the chair of the Conservatoire de Paris. She remained with the Conservatoire until her retirement in 1976.

Gilly was married to baritone Louis Musy. She died on 31 March 1977 in Paris.
