= Ganna Walska =

American opera singer

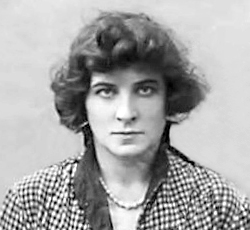
- Passport photo of Ganna Walska (1920)
- Born: Hanna Puacz; June 26, 1887; Brest, Russian Empire
- Died: March 2, 1984 (aged 96); Montecito, California, U.S.
- Known for: Opera; Garden design
- Spouses: Arcadie d'Eingorn (m. 1904; ann. 1906) Joseph Fraenkel (m. 1916; died 1920) Alexander Smith Cochran (m. 1920; div. 1922) Harold Fowler McCormick (m. 1922; div. 1931) Harry Grindell Matthews (m. 1938; died 1941) Theos Bernard (m. 1942; div. 1946)

Ganna Walska (born Hanna Puacz on June 26, 1887 – March 2, 1984) was a Polish opera singer and garden enthusiast who created the Lotusland botanical gardens at her mansion in Montecito, California. Ganna Walska was a coloratura soprano with a vocal range of approximately 2.5 octaves. Her voice was known for its flute-like timbre and a certain frailty, which she combined with the expressiveness of a violinist. She was married six times, four times to wealthy husbands. The lavish promotion of her lackluster opera career by her fourth husband, Harold Fowler McCormick, inspired aspects of the screenplay for Citizen Kane.

== Biography ==
Ganna Walska was born Hanna Puacz on 26 June 1887 in Brest, Russian Empire, to Polish parents Napoleon Puacz and Karolina Massalska. Ganna is a Ukrainian form of Hannah, and Walska "reminiscent of her favorite music, the waltz".

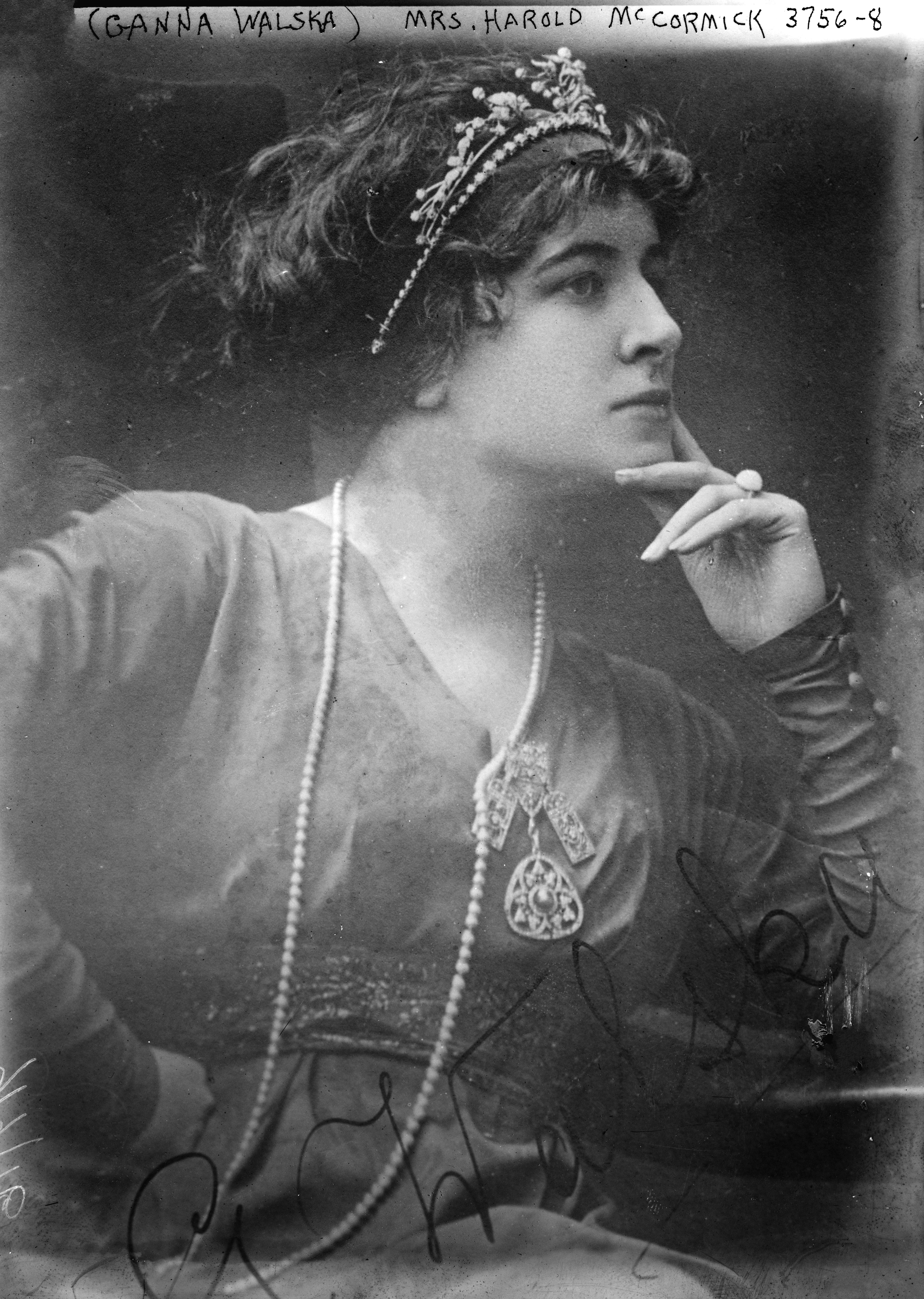
Ganna Walska after her marriage to Harold F. McCormick

In 1922, after her marriage to Harold F. McCormick, Ganna Walska purchased the Théâtre des Champs-Élysées in Paris. She told the Chicago Tribune that she had invested her own funds, not those of her wealthy husband, and said, "I will never appear in my own theatre until I have gained recognition based solely on my merits as an artist."

Walska became a student of vocal teacher Cécile Gilly. Marjorie Lawrence, another student of Gilly's, stated that it was clear that Walska had little aptitude for music, but that Gilly took her on for the money. In 1932 Walska asked Frances Alda to be her student. Alda accepted because of the large remuneration. In her autobiography, after describing Walska's elaborate estate, Alda declares of her student: "But work as I did, I could not teach Ganna Walska to sing."

Walska pursued a career as an opera singer. The lavish promotion of her opera career by McCormick—despite her apparent reputation as a mediocre singer—inspired aspects of the screenplay for Orson Welles's Citizen Kane. Roger Ebert, in his DVD commentary on Citizen Kane, suggests that the character of Susan Alexander was based on Walska. McCormick spent thousands of dollars on voice lessons for her and even arranged for Walska to take the lead in a production of Zazà by Ruggero Leoncavallo at the Chicago Opera in 1920. Reportedly, Walska got into an argument with director Pietro Cimini during dress rehearsal and stormed out of the production before she appeared. Contemporaries said Walska had a terrible voice, pleasing only to McCormick.

New York Times headlines of the day read, "Ganna Walska Fails as Butterfly: Voice Deserts Her Again When She Essays Role of Puccini's Heroine" (January 29, 1925), and "Mme. Walska Clings to Ambition to Sing" (July 14, 1927).

"According to her 1943 memoirs, Always Room at the Top, Walska had tried every sort of fashionable mumbo jumbo to conquer her nerves and salvage her voice," reported The New York Times in 1996. "Nothing worked. During a performance of Giordano's Fedora in Havana she veered so persistently off key that the audience pelted her with rotten vegetables. It was an event that Orson Welles remembered when he began concocting the character of the newspaper publisher's second wife for Citizen Kane."

In 1926 Walska purchased the Duchess of Marlborough Fabergé egg that had been offered by Consuelo Vanderbilt at a charity auction. It was later acquired by Malcolm Forbes as the first Easter egg in his Fabergé egg collection.

Ganna Walska died on March 2, 1984, at Lotusland, leaving her garden and her fortune to the Ganna Walska Lotusland Foundation.

== Marriages ==
Ganna Walska was married six times:

- Russian baron, Arcadie d'Eingorn, a Russian officer. They married in 1904 but the marriage was dissolved two years later. The baron died of tuberculosis in 1915.
- Dr. Joseph Fraenkel, a New York endocrinologist. They were married in 1916, and he died in April 1920.
- Multimillionaire sportsman and carpet tycoon Alexander Smith Cochran. They married in September 1920, and divorced in 1922. He died in 1929.
- Industrialist Harold Fowler McCormick. They married August 11, 1922 at the City Hall in Passy in Paris. They divorced in 1931. He died in 1941.
- English inventor of an alleged death ray, Harry Grindell Matthews. They married in 1938 and he died in 1941.
- Theos Bernard, her sixth and last husband. He was a scholar of hatha yoga and Tibetan Buddhism and the author of books on the philosophy of India and Tibet. They married in 1942 and divorced in 1946. He died in 1947.

== Lotusland ==
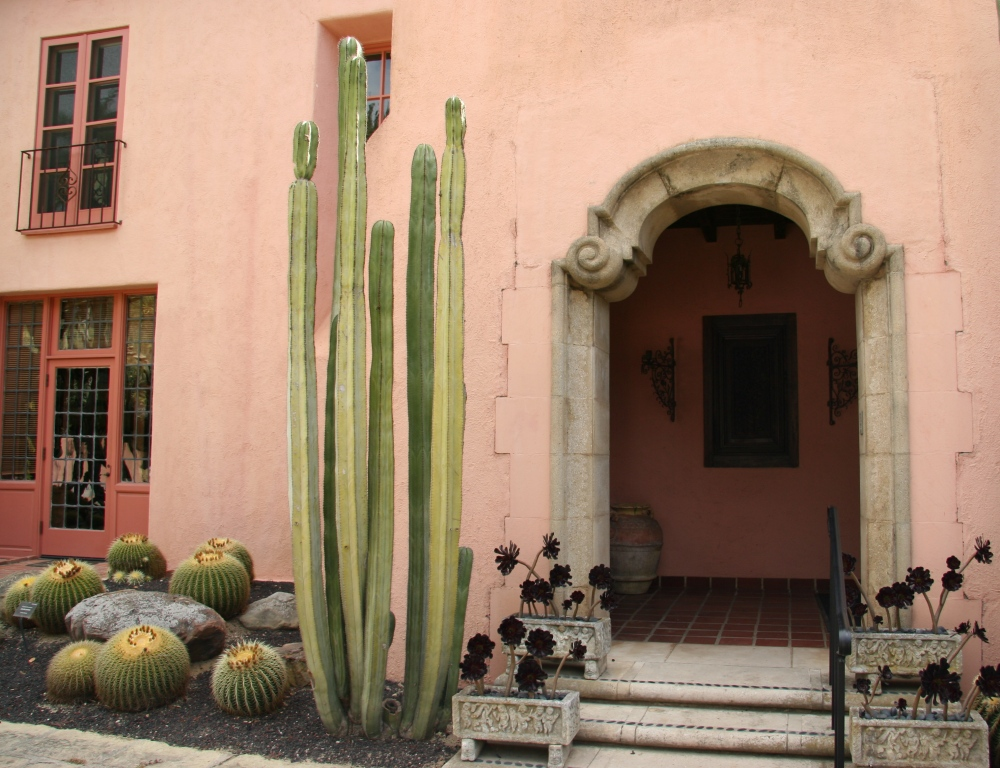
Mansion entrance at Lotusland

In 1941, with the encouragement of her sixth husband Theos Bernard, she purchased the historic 37-acre (15 ha) "Cuesta Linda" estate in Montecito near Santa Barbara, California, intending to use it as a retreat for Tibetan monks. Due to restrictions on wartime visas, the monks (Gendun Chompel or Gendün Chöphel (Tibetan: དགེ་འདུན་ཆོས་འཕེལ།, Wylie: dge 'dun chos 'phel)[1] (1903–1951) was a Tibetan scholar, thinker, writer, poet, linguist, and artist. He was born in 1903 in Shompongshe, Rebkong, Amdo) were unable to come to the United States. After her divorce from Bernard in 1946, Walska changed the name of her estate to Lotusland (after a famous flower held sacred in Indian and Tibetan religions, the lotus, Nelumbo nucifera) and the lotus growing in several of her garden's ponds. She devoted the rest of her life to designing, redesigning, expanding, and maintaining the estate's gardens. Her landscape designs became known for their distinctive layout and extensive use of plants, sculpture, and architectural elements.

== Honors ==
- Gold Cross of Merit from the Polish government in 1931.
- Légion d'honneur order from the French government in 1934.
- L'Ordre National des Arts et des Lettres from the French government in 1972.
