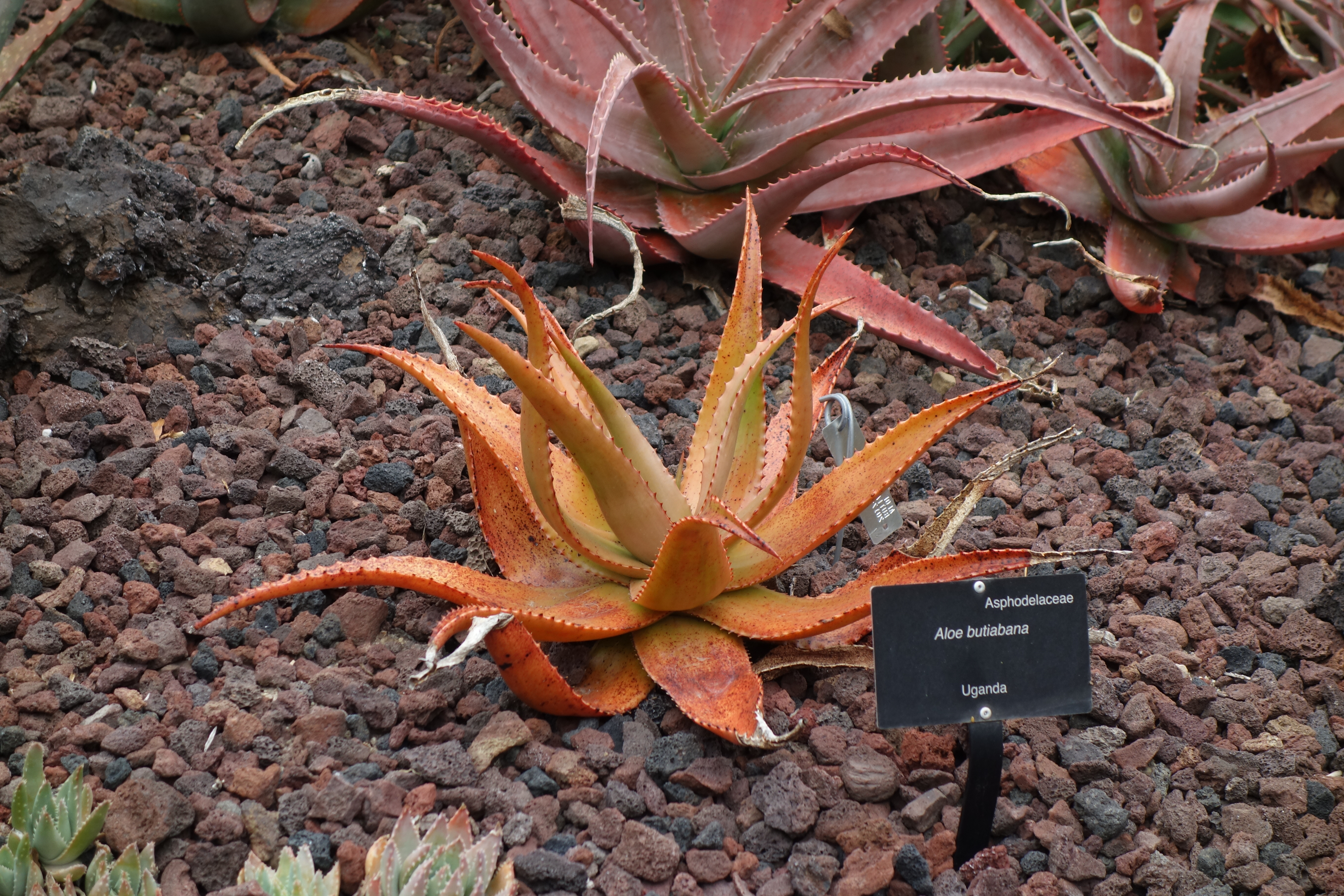
- Aloe butiabana in Lotusland

Conservation status
- Vulnerable (IUCN 3.1)
- CITES Appendix II

Scientific classification
- Kingdom: Plantae
- Clade: Tracheophytes
- Clade: Angiosperms
- Clade: Monocots
- Order: Asparagales
- Family: Asphodelaceae
- Subfamily: Asphodeloideae
- Genus: Aloe
- Species: A. butiabana

Binomial name
- Aloe butiabana T.C.Cole & T.G.Forrest

= Aloe butiabana =

Species of succulent

Aloe butiabana is a species of Aloe native to western Uganda.
