= Harry Grindell Matthews =

English inventor

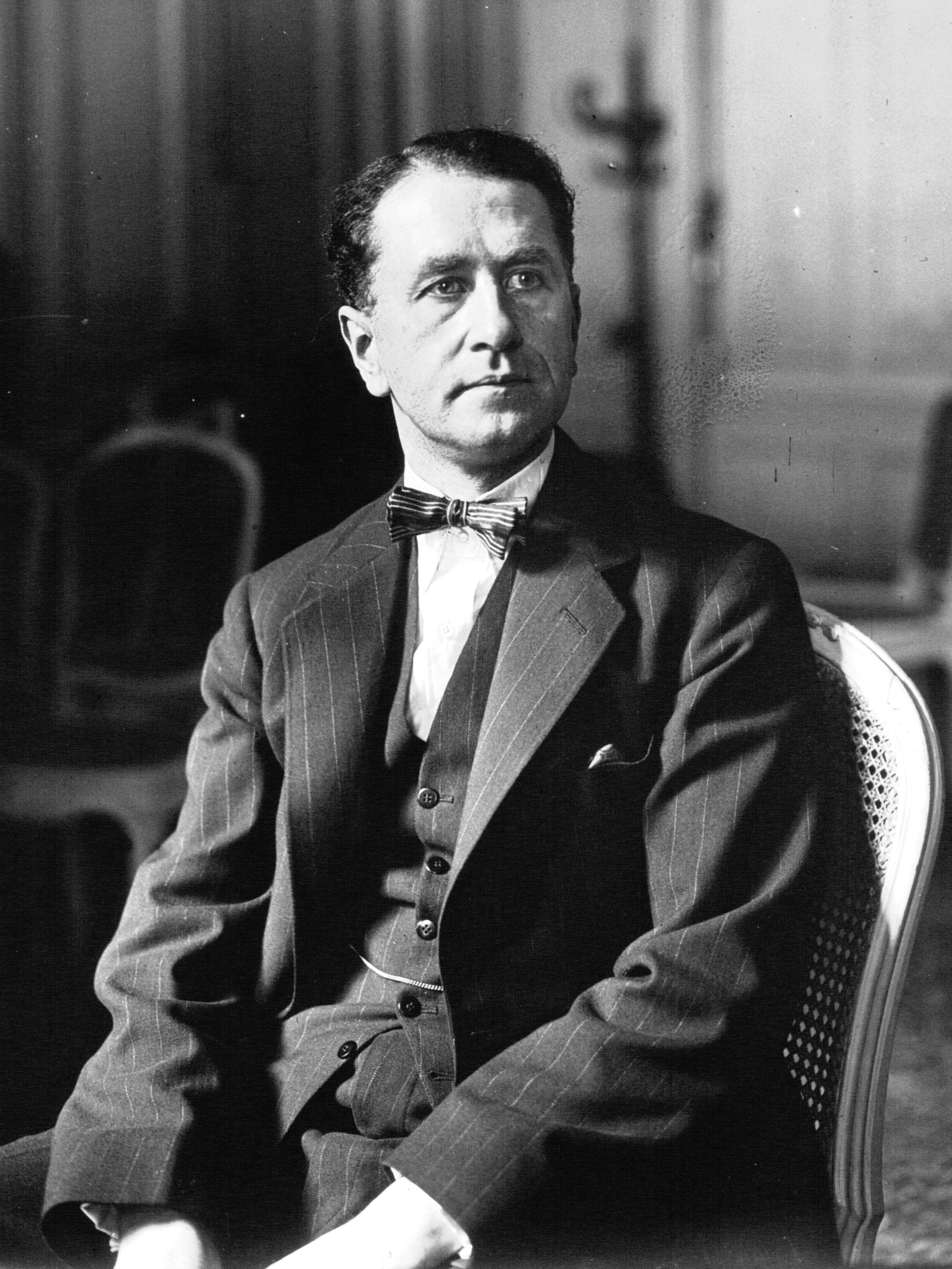
- Matthews in 1924
- Born: 17 March 1880; Winterbourne, Gloucestershire, England
- Died: 11 September 1941 (aged 61); Tor Clawdd, Rhydypandy (Swansea), Wales
- Education: Merchant Venturer's School
- Occupation: Inventor
- Spouse: Ganna Walska (m. 1938–1941; his death)

Harry Grindell Matthews (17 March 1880 – 11 September 1941) was an English inventor who claimed to have invented a death ray in the 1920s.

== Early life and inventions ==
Harry Grindell Matthews was born on 17 March 1880 in Winterbourne, Gloucestershire. Matthews studied at the Merchant Venturers' School in Bristol and became an electronic engineer. During the Second Boer War, Matthews served in the South African Constabulary and was twice wounded.

In 1911, Matthews claimed that he had invented an Aerophone device, a radiotelephone, and transmitted messages between a ground station and an aeroplane from a distance of 2 miles (3.2 km). His experiments attracted government attention, and on 4 July 1912, Matthews visited Buckingham Palace. However, when the British Admiralty requested a demonstration of the Aerophone, Matthews demanded that no experts be present at the scene. When four observers dismantled part of the apparatus before the demonstration began and took notes, Matthews cancelled the demonstration and drove observers away.

Newspapers rushed to Matthews' defence. The War Office denied tampering and claimed the demonstration was a failure. The government later stated that the affair was just a misunderstanding.

In 1914, after the outbreak of the First World War, the British government announced an award of £25,000 to anyone who could create a weapon against zeppelins or remotely control uncrewed vehicles. Matthews claimed he had developed a remote control system using selenium cells. Matthews successfully demonstrated it with a remotely controlled boat to representatives of the Admiralty at Richmond Park's Penn Pond. Matthews received his £25,000, but the Admiralty never used the invention.

Next, Matthews appeared in public in 1921 and claimed to have invented the world's first talking picture, a farewell interview of Ernest Shackleton recorded on 16 September 1921, shortly before Shackleton's last expedition. The film was not commercially successful. Other talking-picture processes had been developed before that of Matthews, including processes by William K. L. Dickson, Photokinema (Orlando Kellum) and Phonofilm (Lee DeForest). However, Matthews claimed his process was the first sound-on-film.

== Death ray ==
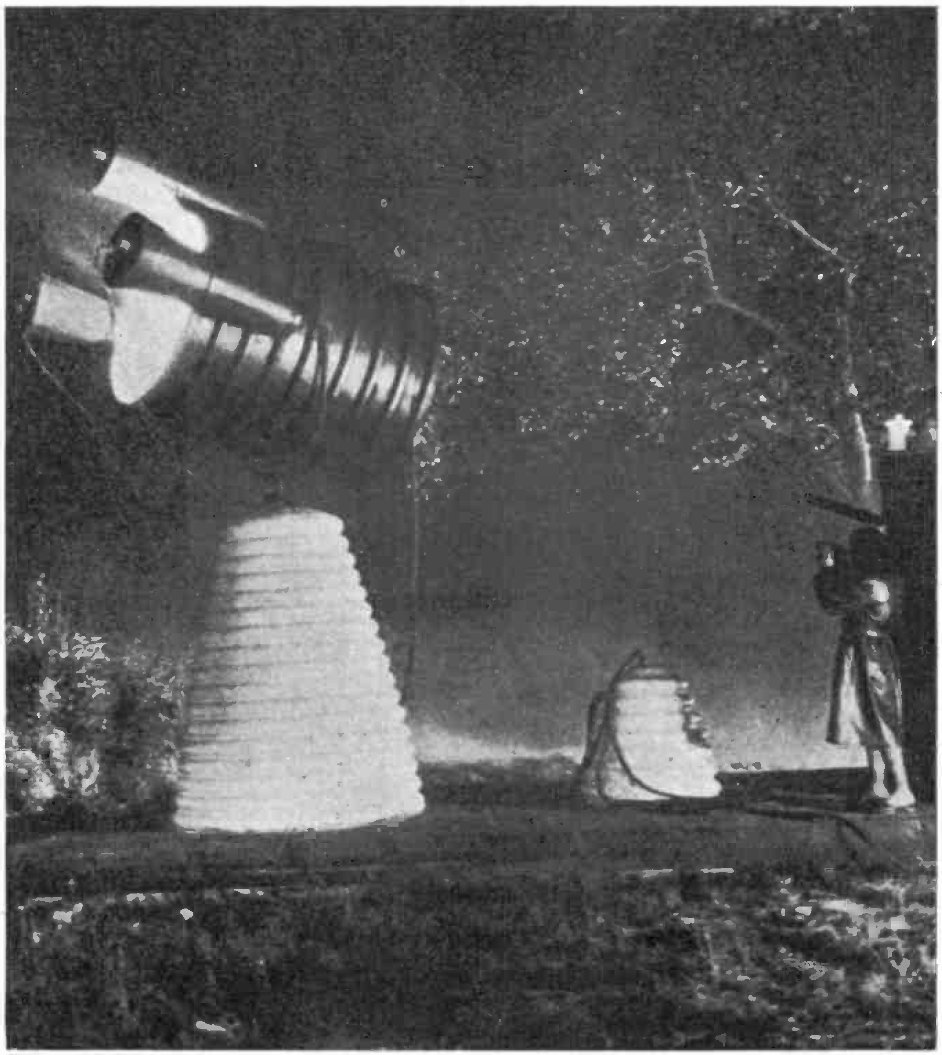
1925 photo that purports to show a night demonstration of the ray on the island of Flat Holm

In 1923, Matthews claimed that he had invented an electric ray that would put magnetos out of action. In a demonstration to select journalists, Matthews stopped a motorcycle engine from a distance. Matthews also claimed that with enough power it could shoot down aeroplanes, explode gunpowder, stop ships, and incapacitate infantry from the distance of 4 miles (6.4 km). Newspapers obliged by publishing sensational accounts of his invention.

The War Office contacted Matthews in February 1924 to request a demonstration of his ray. Matthews did not reply to them but spoke to journalists and demonstrated the ray to a Star reporter by igniting gunpowder from a distance. Matthews still refused to say how the ray worked but insisted it did. When the British government still refused to rush to buy his ideas, Matthews announced that he had an offer from France.

The Air Ministry was wary, partly because of previous bad experiences with would-be inventors. Matthews was invited back to London to demonstrate his ray to the armed forces on 26 April. In Matthews's laboratory, they saw how his ray switched on a light bulb and cut off a motor. Matthews failed to convince the officials, who also suspected trickery or a confidence game. When the British Admiralty requested further demonstration, Matthews refused to give it.

On 27 May 1924, the High Court in London granted an injunction to Matthew's investors that forbade him from selling the rights to the death ray. When Major Wimperis arrived at Matthews's laboratory to negotiate a new deal, Matthews had already flown to Paris. Matthews's backers also appeared on the scene and rushed to Croydon airport to stop him, but it was too late.

Public furore attracted the interest of other would-be inventors who wanted to demonstrate death rays to the War Office. None of them were convincing. On 28 May, Commander Kenworthy asked in the House of Commons what the government intended to do to stop Matthews from selling the ray to a foreign power. The Under Secretary for Air answered that Matthews was not willing to let them investigate the ray to their satisfaction. A government representative also stated that one ministry official had stood before the ray and survived. Newspapers continued to root for Matthews.

The government required that Matthews use the ray to stop a petrol motorcycle engine in the conditions that would satisfy the Air Ministry. Matthews would receive £1000 and further consideration. From France, Matthews answered that he was unwilling to give proof of that kind and already had eight bids to choose from. Matthews also claimed that he had lost sight in his left eye because of his experiments. His involvement with his French backer Eugene Royer aroused further suspicions in Britain.

Sir Samuel Instone and his brother Theodore offered Matthews a huge salary if he kept the ray in Britain and demonstrated that it actually worked. Matthews refused again—he did not want to give any proof that the ray worked as he claimed it would.

Matthews returned to London on 1 June 1924 and gave an interview to the Sunday Express. Matthews claimed that he had a deal with Royer. The press again took his side. The only demonstration Matthews was willing to give was to make a Pathé film The Death Ray to propagate his ideas to his satisfaction. The device in the movie bore no resemblance to the one government officials had seen.

In July 1924, Matthews left for the US to market his invention. When Matthews was offered $25,000 to demonstrate his beam to the Radio World Fair at Madison Square Garden, he again refused and claimed, without foundation, that he was not permitted to demonstrate it outside England. US scientists were not impressed. One Professor Woods offered to stand before the death ray device to demonstrate his disbelief. Regardless, when Matthews returned to Britain, he claimed that the USA had bought his ray but refused to say who had done it and for how much. Matthews moved to the US and began to work for Warner Bros.

== Further inventions ==
In 1925, Matthews invented what he called the "luminaphone".

On 24 December 1930, Matthews was back in England with his new creation – a Sky Projector that projected pictures onto clouds. Matthews demonstrated it in Hampstead by projecting an angel, the message "Happy Christmas", and a reportedly "accurate" clock face. Matthews demonstrated it again in New York. This invention was unsuccessful, and by 1931, Matthews faced bankruptcy. Matthews used most of his investors' money to live in expensive hotels.

In 1934, Matthews had a new set of investors and relocated to Tor Clawdd, Betws, South Wales. Matthews built a fortified laboratory and airfield. In 1935, Matthews claimed that he worked on aerial mines and, in 1937, invented a system for detecting submarines. In 1938, Matthews married Ganna Walska, a Polish-American opera singer, perfumer, and feminist, whose four previous husbands had owned fortunes totalling $125,000,000.

In 1935, Matthews became involved with the right-wing Lucy, Lady Houston, and intended to conduct experiments in French naval submarine detection from her luxury yacht, the Liberty. In 2010, new research chronicled the episode, explaining how Matthews was frustrated in carrying out his aims.

Later, Matthews propagated the idea of the "stratoplane" and joined the British Interplanetary Society. His reputation preceded him, and the British Government was no longer interested in his ideas.

== Personal life ==
Harry Grindell Matthews was the fifth husband of singer Ganna Walska; they married in 1938. Matthews died of a heart attack on 11 September 1941.

== See also ==
- Samuel Alfred Warner – a purported inventor of naval weapons in the first half of the 19th century.
