= Herbert Schneider =

American philosopher

- Born: Herbert Wallace Schneider; March 16, 1892; Berea, Ohio, U.S.
- Died: October 15, 1984 (aged 92); Claremont, California, U.S.
- Spouse(s): Carol Catherine Smith Schneider; Grenafore Westphal
- Children: 3

Education
- Education: City College of New York; Columbia University (B.A., 1915; Ph.D., 1917)
- Thesis: Science and Social Progress: A Philosophical Introduction to Moral Science
- Doctoral advisor: John Dewey

Philosophical work
- School: Pragmatic naturalism
- Institutions: Columbia University; Colorado College; Claremont Colleges
- Main interests: Social philosophy, ontology, pragmatism, fascism

Herbert Wallace Schneider (March 16, 1892 – October 15, 1984) was a German American professor of philosophy and a religious studies scholar long associated with Columbia University.

Born in Berea, Ohio, Schneider completed his undergraduate and graduate education at Columbia, going on to teach at that school for many years. An early student of John Dewey, he studied pragmatism, ontology, social philosophy, and fascism, and is best remembered for his works The Puritan Mind (1930) and A History of American Philosophy (1946). The Herbert Schneider Award, an annual presentation of the Society for the Advancement of American Philosophy, is named in his honor.

== Early life and education ==
Schneider was born in Berea, Ohio, where his father, Fredrick William Schneider, a German Methodist minister, was a professor at German-Wallace College. The family moved to Brooklyn when Fredrick accepted a call to the Greene Ave. Methodist Church. There, Herbert attended Boy's High School. He attended the City College of New York as an undergraduate for one year from 1911 to 1912 before transferring to Columbia University, from which he earned a B.A. magna cum laude and was elected to Phi Beta Kappa. As a graduate student at Columbia, Schneider studied under John Dewey, later serving as Dewey's teaching assistant. His doctoral thesis was titled Science and Social Progress: A Philosophical Introduction to Moral Science.

== Career ==
=== Principal work ===
Beginning in 1918 Schneider lectured in philosophy and religion at Columbia University, a post he held until his retirement in 1957. He early assisted John Erskine in teaching the very first sessions of his revolutionary Great Books course and, as a member of the team led by Harry Carman, developed Columbia College's core curriculum Humanities and Contemporary Civilization courses. For 37 years, beginning in 1924, he was editor of The Journal of Philosophy, Psychology and Scientific Methods. In 1928 he was installed into the newly created post of Professor of Religion, becoming one of the founding members of Columbia's newly formed religion department.

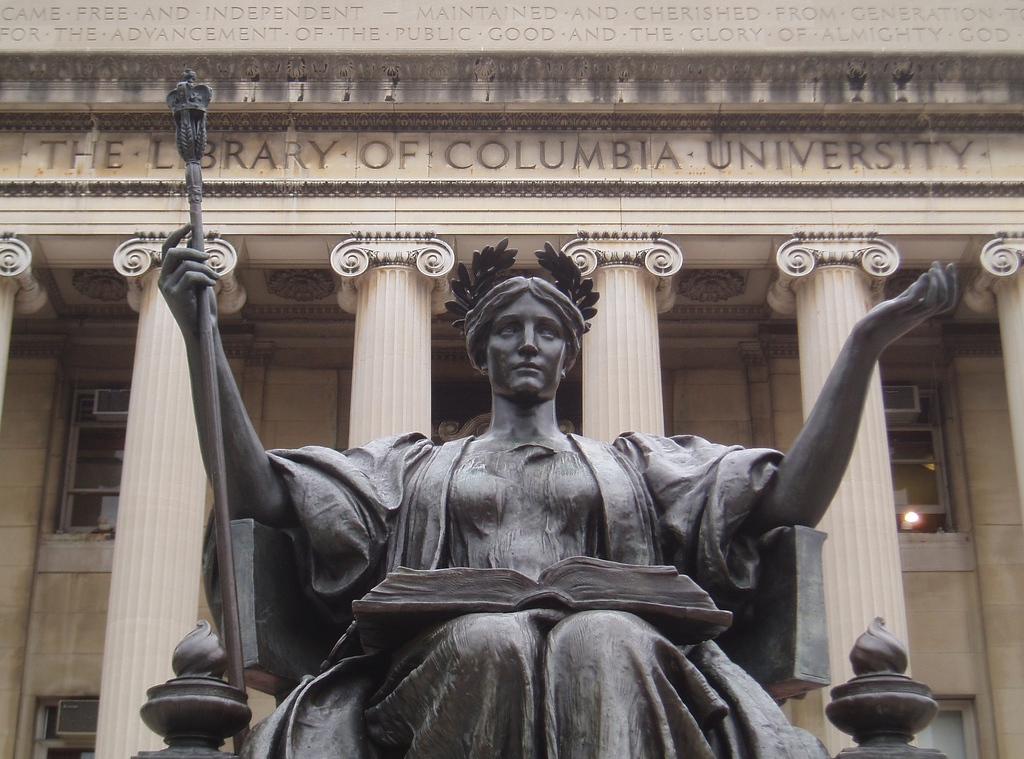
Herbert Schneider's 44-year association with Columbia University began when he enrolled as an undergraduate student in 1913.

Schneider's 1930 book The Puritan Mind received acclaim for its treatment of Puritan religious ideas within their social context. However, his 1946 volume A History of American Philosophy, which was translated into several languages and became a formative text on the subject of American philosophy, has become the work for which Schneider is most often remembered.

During the early 1940s, Schneider supervised the graduate work of the yogi Theos Bernard and, in 1948, was one of five philosophy professors at Columbia who nominated the recently assassinated Mahatma Gandhi for the Nobel Peace Prize. From 1948 to 1949 he served as president of the eastern division of the American Philosophical Association.

In 1950, Schneider was a Fulbright Fellow and lectured on American philosophy at the Sorbonne and the Universities of Toulouse, Bordeaux, Aix en Provence, Grenoble, and Marseilles, and, from 1952 to 1957 was an Eranos lecturer in Ascona, Switzerland. He also held visiting professorships at University of Illinois, University of Washington, University of Georgia, University of Hawaii, Oregon State University and Western Washington State College.

=== Fascism ===
During the 1920s and 1930s, at the request of Columbia's President, Nicolas Murray Butler, Schneider undertook a study of the emerging Fascist government in Italy. He traveled and studied extensively in Italy in 1928 and again in 1937 for prolonged research sabbaticals. His study of the structure and ideology of Italian society and government was published in his books Making the Fascist State and The Fascist Government of Italy. Schneider's interest in fascism originated in his academic study of pragmatism and his view of democracy as an experimental hypothesis that had yet to prove its efficacy against alternative systems. During his first stay in Italy, Schneider wrote to his mentor, Dewey, observing that:

I am finding it [Italy] an even more interesting laboratory than I had anticipated for the study of how ideas are generated by practice and how they subsequently operate. Almost overnight a whole new world of the imagination has been created here, apparently powerful enough to act as though it were true, and with half a chance of becoming true.

In his public writings, however, he was careful to mask his personal feelings on the subject, causing one reviewer to remark that "it is impossible to tell whether his conclusions as to the Fascist mind and the heroic breed are his own judgments or simply expositions of Fascist claims". During a 1976 interview, Schneider cautiously rejected suggestions he had been personally sympathetic to Benito Mussolini, explaining his work as academic inquiry only.

=== UNESCO ===
In 1954, Schneider took a leave of absence from Columbia to join UNESCO as head of the Division of International Cultural Cooperation. In that post, he completed an extensive survey and report on university education in Asia, among other accomplishments. He returned to Columbia in 1956.

=== After Columbia ===
Following his 1957 retirement from Columbia, Schneider briefly taught at Colorado College and the University of Hawaii. He spent 12 years at Claremont Graduate School in Claremont, California, where he helped start the doctoral program in philosophy. He also served as Acting Dean for several years.

=== Blaisdell Institute for World Religions ===
In 1959, Schneider was appointed Director of the Blaisdell Institute for World Religions at the Claremont Colleges. He facilitated scholarly exchanges with universities in the Far East, and organized a number of international conferences.

== Personal life ==
With his second wife, Grenafore Westphal, Schneider had three sons, Edward, Frederick, and Robert. He died on October 15, 1984, in Claremont, California.

== Legacy ==
In 1987, the Society for the Advancement of American Philosophy established the Herbert Schneider Award, which is presented annually for lifetime contributions to the advancement of American philosophy. Schneider's papers are held in deposit at Columbia University. His papers after 1938 have been deposited at Southern Illinois University Carbondale.

== Selected publications ==
- Schneider, H. (1929). The Making of the Fascist State. Chicago: University of Chicago Press.
- Schneider, H. (1930). The Puritan Mind. New York: Columbia University Press.
- Schneider, H. (1936). The Fascist Government of Italy. New York: Van Nostrand.
- Schneider, H. (1946). A History of American Philosophy. New York: Columbia University Press.
- Schneider, H. (1952). Religion in 20th Century America. Cambridge: Harvard University Press.
- Schneider, H. (1964). Sources of Contemporary Philosophical Realism in America. Indianapolis: Bobbs-Merrill.
