= Dinh Gilly =

French opera singer

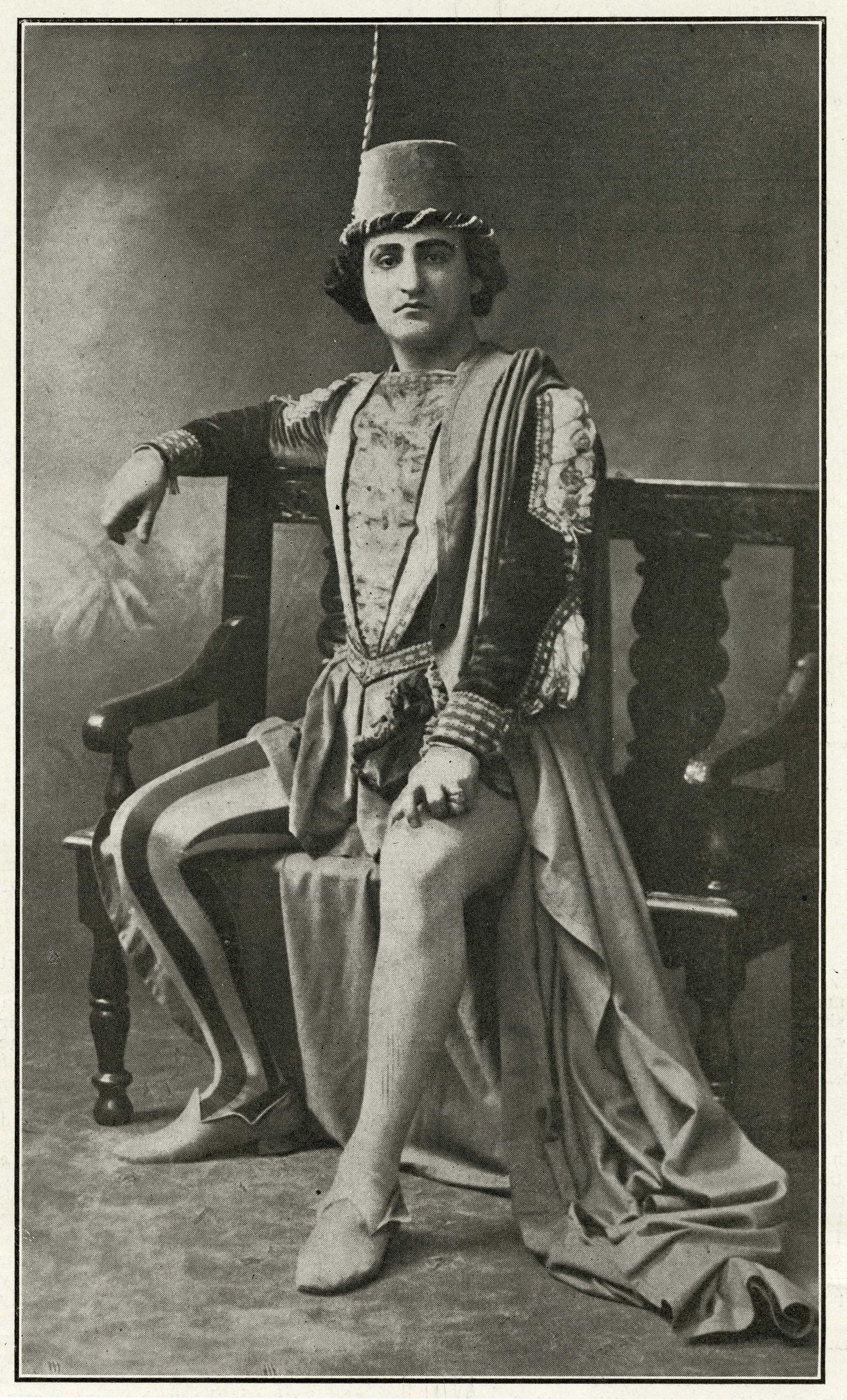
Dinh Gilly as Mercutio in Gounod's Roméo et Juliette.

Dinh Gilly (19 July 1877 – 19 May 1940) was a French-Algerian operatic baritone and teacher.

== Biography ==
He studied in Toulouse, Rome (with Antonio Cotogni), and at the Conservatoire de Paris, where he won a first prize in 1902. That same year he made his debut at the Paris Opera as Silvio in Leoncavallo's Pagliacci. In 1908 he left the Paris Opera and from 1909 to 1914 he performed at the Metropolitan Opera in New York City. He also sang at The Royal Opera House, Covent Garden, and later taught in London. During this period he also headlined on fourteen occasions at the Royal Albert Hall, London. His students there included Dennis Noble and John Brownlee.

On 4 January 1925, he opened the 'Dinh Gilly School of Singing' at Brinsmead Studios, 17 Cavendish Square, London with fellow singer Margaret Bruce. He later ran the school with his second wife, the contralto Edith Furmedge.

Gilly made about 40 gramophone recordings, which show him to have been a stylish and intelligent singer.

== Personal ==
His first wife was Cécile Gilly. His second wife was Edith Furmedge. His daughter by his first wife was Renée Gilly.
