= Edith Furmedge =

British contralto

Edith Furmage
- Born: 27 March 1890; London, England
- Died: 9 October 1956 (aged 66); London, England
- Occupations: Operatic contralto; Academic teacher
- Spouse: Dinh Gilly

Edith Ellen Furmedge (London, 27 March 1890—London, 9 October 1956) was a British operatic contralto and singing teacher.

After secondary school she attended Homerton College, Cambridge to train as a teacher. While in attendance she took up singing and abandoned a career in teaching. She studied with Dinh Gilly whom she eventually married on 2 June 1932.

The first mention of Furmedge in the Musical Times from 1921 speaks of her as a participating soloist the Sheffield Amateur Musical Society.

Endowed with a powerful voice she obtained small parts in Der Ring des Nibelungen at Covent Garden. She participated in early acoustic recordings of excerpts from The Ring. Reviewing one of her earliest performances, a highly astute critic in the Musical Times reported:

Miss Edith Furmedge, a contralto, sang on March 21, and excited considerable interest in her prospects. Her gifts are well above the ordinary. It is a stately voice. (The singer's stately presence was no disadvantage either.) She has the power to sing with the depth of a full contralto and the means to relieve the heaviness of such singing at appropriate moments. There was a fine fervour, a ready interpretative wit. miss Furmedge's voice was placed where it could tell most vividly, and there was a ring of decision in her tones. in the Alto Rhapsody of Brahms she made a particular impressions. The way of this singer toward a still higher accomplishment will be by closer attention to detail. She needs to loosen certain vowels and sharpen her diction. And she showed a habit f lungeing at detached upper notes. her v's, among other consonants, needed vivifying. Certain items of Miss Furmedge's programme were a trifle disconcerting, as indicating a not very assured taste.

She sang regularly under Sir Henry Wood in London and at provincial festivals.

By the 1930s she was appearing regularly as Erda and Fricka in The Ring. In addition to Wood, she sang under Thomas Beecham, Bruno Walter, Wilhelm Furtwängler, Albert Coates and others.

She was a member of the British National Opera Company. Her participation in radio broadcasts helped raise her profile among the public. As noted in her obituary, "her impressive voice and majestic sense of style came over particularly well on the air."

After a hiatus she returned to singing the Wagnerian roles in 1948–49.

For many years she taught in the "music school" (actually their studio) her husband Dinh Gilly, had established, and continued teaching after his death in 1940.

Her obituary in Opera magazine noted her "refreshing sense of calm" that she imparted to others. Furmedge's self-effacing character provided a sense of ease to her students and the many who came in contact with her.

== Sources ==
- "Furmedge, Edith" Algemene Muziek Encyclopedie, 19800101, Vol. 3
- "Miss Edith Furmedge". The Times. London. 11 October 1956. p. 14.
- H.J.K (1 May 1924). "Some Singers of the Month". Musical Times. London. p. 456.
- Wallis, Cedric (1956). "Edith Furmedge". Opera. 10. London: 733–34. ISSN 0030-3526.
