= Halle Opera House =

Opera house in Halle, Germany

Coordinates: 51°29′12″N 11°58′17″E

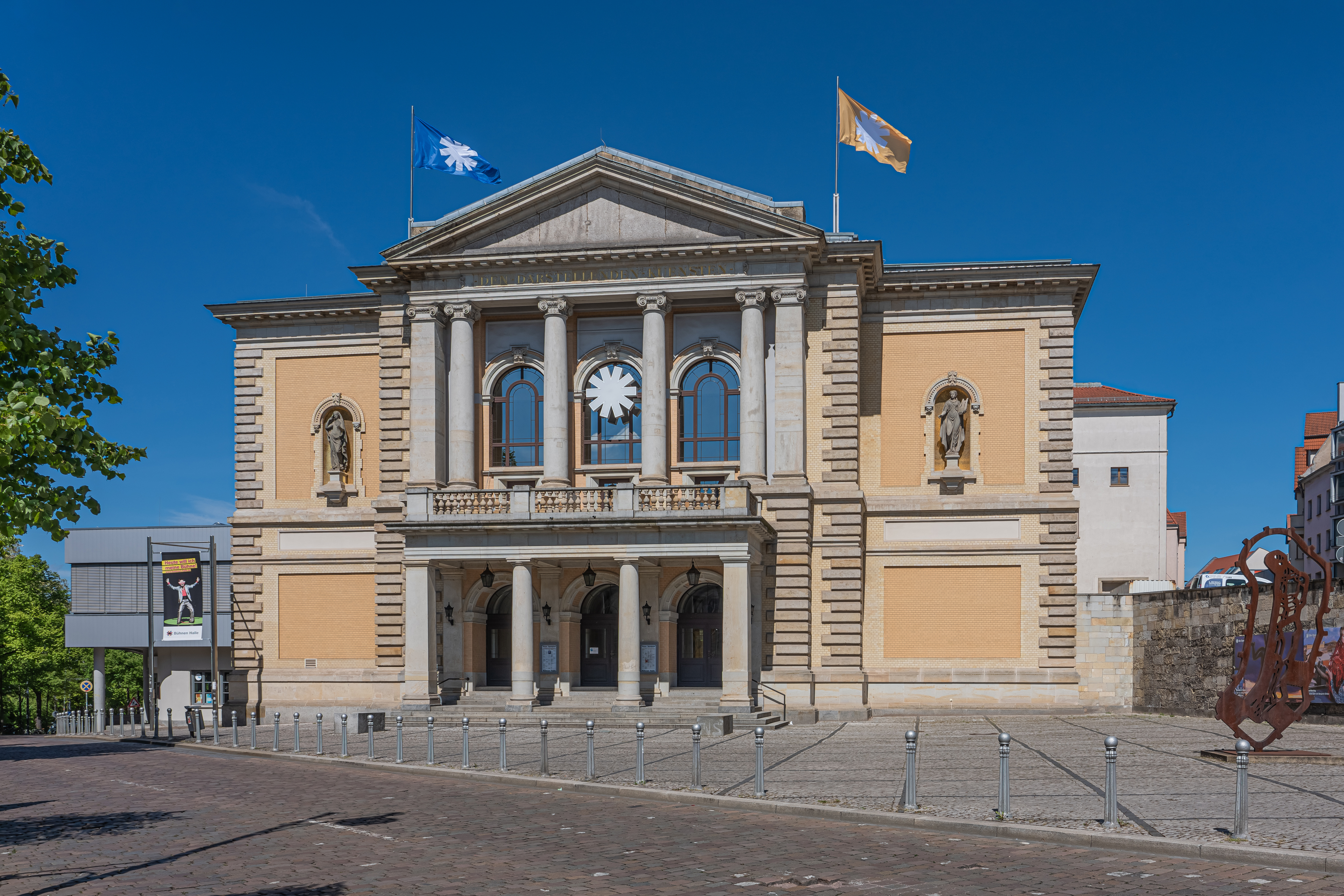
Halle Opera House

The Halle Opera House (German: Opernhaus Halle) is an opera house located in Halle, Saxony-Anhalt, Germany.

== History ==
Originally named the Halle Town Theatre (German: Stadttheater von Halle), the theatre building was constructed in 1886 by architect Heinrich Seeling. From 1914 to 1919 Leopold Sachse served as director of the theater.

=== Bomb attack ===
On 31 March, 1945, a bomb attack destroyed much of the original building. Restoration work began a few years later, and the theatre reopened in 1951 under the name Landestheater Halle. In January 1992, it was renamed to its current title.

== Currently ==
Today, the Halle Opera House hosts performances of opera, ballet, and orchestral concerts. It also serves as the main performance venue for the annual summer Handel Festival held in the city.
