= Cécile Gilly =

French opera singer

- Born: Cécile Marie Puyo
- Other name: Cecile Roma
- Occupation: voice teacher
- Spouse(s): Dinh Gilly, ex-husband

Cécile Gilly (known on the stage as Cecile Roma, born approximately 1891) was a French mezzo-soprano and singing teacher. A well-known pedagogue in the 1920s and 1930s, she is known primarily as being the voice teacher of soprano Marjorie Lawrence.

== Biography ==
Cécile Marie Puyo was the daughter of Armand Crosper Puyo and Guerite Lydie Legall. She married the baritone Dinh Gilly on 20 July 1902. On the manifest for Cécile and Dinh Gilly's voyage to New York (to prepare for their debuts at the Metropolitan Opera), the manifest states that they were living in Paris on Villa Reine-Henriette Colombe.

== Singing career ==
Cécile and Dinh Gilly arrived in New York on 23 October 1909. Under the stage name Cecile Roma, Cécile made her Met Opera company debut on December 14, 1909 in the role of Amarante of Charles Lecocq's La fille de Madame Angot, the company appearing at the New Theatre. Other roles with the company included the Priestess in Aida and Lola in Cavalleria Rusticana. When the Met appeared in Paris on tour, Cécile appeared with the company and stayed in France, while Dinh continued his American career and began an affair with soprano Emmy Destinn.

== Teaching career ==
Marjorie Lawrence's autobiography, Interrupted Melody is the main source of information on Gilly's approach to vocal pedagogy. Ironically, it was John Brownlee, student of Dinh Gilly, who suggested that Lawrence study with his former wife. By the time Marjorie Lawrence became her student in 1928, Cécile Gilly had developed a noted reputation as a singing teacher.

Lawrence described starting her study with Gilly with "nothing but scales and exercises." This continued for "day after day for many weeks." When she was ready to take on repertoire, Gilly had Lawrence start with arias by Rossini and Mozart "calculated still further to strengthen my technique." Lawrence summarized "...Madame Gilly never was satisfied. Any pupil with possibilities who studied with her had her nose kept to the grindstone." Lawrence also wrote about Gilly's holistic approach to becoming a professional singer and did much to steer Lawrence in the direction of gaining cultural and social education.

Lawrence briefly mentioned Gilly's difficult life through giving up a potential singing career in order to have children, only to have her husband abandon her and thus having to support herself as a voice teacher. It was with such empathy that Lawrence recounts that Gilly had to take on students with substandard talent. This included one of Gilly's more notorious students, Ganna Walska. In an unintentionally humorous page, Lawrence described the extremely affluent Walska as almost completely lacking musical talent, but Gilly maintaining her as a student due to significant financial remuneration.

In his biography of Marjorie Lawrence, Richard Harding Davis provides additional detail underscoring Cécile Gilly's difficult life. The estrangement between Cécile and Dinh was not total. Occasionally Dinh would show up at Cécile's house, resulting in two additional children. During the World War II occupation of Paris, she lived at her estate in Euse. Her son Max was a prisoner of war, and her daughter Yvonne had recently died of blood poisoning, leaving Yvonne's three children (one of whom was only four months old) to be cared for by Cécile. Another one of Cecile's children, Paulette, had left the care of her twins to Cécile; another daughter, Renée, had left one child with Cécile. This put Cécile in charge of six grandchildren.

== Students ==
Cécile Gilly's students included:

- Morva Davies
- Dorothy Gadsden
- Renée Gilly
- Gertrude Hutton
- Doris Irwin
- Marjorie Lawrence
- Rita Miller
- Gladys Petrie
- Clarence Russell
- ca:Raimon Torres i Clavé
- Sam Waagenaar
- Ganna Walska

== Dedication ==
Composer Philippe Gaubert dedicated his song "Musique sur l'eau" from the cycle Au jardin de l'infante to Gilly.

== Works consulted ==
- Davis, Richard Michael (2012). Wotan's Daughter: The Life of Marjorie Lawrence. Kent Town, S. Australia: Wakefield Press. ISBN 9781743052105.
- Lawrence, Marjorie (1949). Interrupted Melody: an Autobiography. Sydney: Invincible Press.
- Williams, Beth Mary (2002), Lineages of Vocal Pedagogy in Australia, 1850-1950, Melbourne: University of Melbourne
