= Leopold Sachse =

Leopold Sachse (January 5, 1880 – April 3, 1961) was German-born American bass, stage director, vocal coach, and opera director. He began his career as an opera singer in Germany in the first decade of the 20th century. He served as director of several German opera houses; including Münster Stadttheater (1907-1910), Halle Opera House (1914-1919), and the Hamburg State Opera (1922-1935). In 1935 he left his native country after becoming a political target of the Nazi Party. He immigrated to the United States where he worked for the Metropolitan Opera and New York City Opera as a stage director. He also taught on the faculties of the Juilliard School and the Academy of Vocal Arts.

== Early life and education ==
Leopold Sachse was born in Berlin, Germany on January 5, 1880. He was trained as a singer at the Cologne Conservatory. He also studied music privately in Berlin, Vienna, and Milan. In the latter city he was a pupil of Alberto Selva.

== Career ==
As an opera singer, Sachse first performed in minor character parts at the Schiller Theater in Berlin. In 1906 he made his debut as a leading bass at Theater Kiel. In 1907-1908 he was engaged as a singer at the Strasbourg Opera House. In Kiel and Strasbourg he took on most of the leading bass roles in the operas of Richard Wagner.

In 1907 Sachse was appointed director of Münster Stadttheater. He concurrently was appointed to a lecture post at the University of Münster where taught courses in stage technique, voice, and diction. In 1911 he founded his own opera company in Berlin. From 1914 to 1919 he was director of the Halle Opera House. Conductors who worked under him at that theatre included Richard Strauss and Hans Pfitzner. During this period he staged operas as a guest director at festivals in Italy, France, Spain, and the Netherlands. He also staged productions at the La Gaîté Lyrique in Paris.

From 1922 to 1935 Sachse was director of the Hamburg State Opera. Operas staged for the first time in Hamburg under his tenure included Richard Strauss's Intermezzo, Ferruccio Busoni's Doktor Faust, Hans Pfitzner's Palestrina, Leoš Janáček's Jenůfa, Ernst Krenek's Leben des Orest, and Krenek's Jonny spielt auf.

== Later life and career in the United States ==
With the rise of Nazi Germany, Sachse immigrated to the United States due to political persecution. He took a post as stage director at the Metropolitan Opera ("the Met") where he worked from 1935 to 1941. He concurrently taught at the Juilliard School where he joined the faculty in 1936. In 1945 he joined the staff of the New York City Opera (NYC). He directed operas and worked as a vocal coach for NYCO for the next ten years. In 1956 he joined the faculty of the Academy of Vocal Arts in Philadelphia. He also taught at the American Theatre Wing.

Sachse died in Englewood, New Jersey on April 3, 1961.
