= Lotusland =

Non-profit botanical garden in Montecito, California

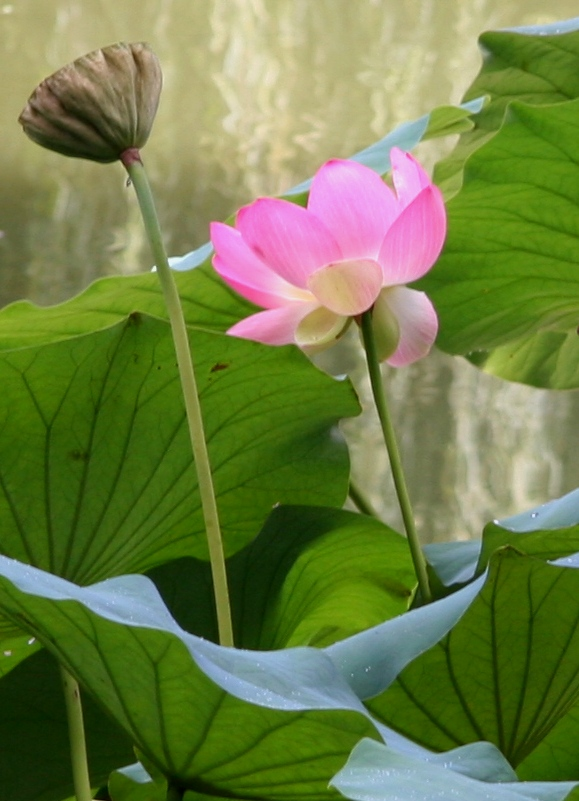
- Lotus plants at Lotusland

- Location within California Location within the United States
- Type: Botanical garden
- Location: Montecito, California
- Coordinates: 34.4430°N 119.6570°W
- Area: 37 acres (15 ha; 0.058 sq mi)

Ganna Walska Lotusland, also known as Lotusland, is a non-profit botanical garden located in Montecito, California, United States. The (15 ha / 37 acres) garden is the historic estate of Ganna Walska. Lotusland is home to 3,500 different plants. The County of Santa Barbara restricts visitation via a conditional use permit: Lotusland botanic garden is open to the public by reservation only.

== History ==
In the 1870s the property was first used as a nursery.

Ralph Kinton Stevens purchased the land in 1882; he and his wife, Caroline Lucy Tallant, named the property "Tanglewood". This name was inspired by the abundance of oak and chaparral on the property. They established a lemon and palm nursery and eventually added other tropical plants to the collection. Stevens was among the early plantsmen of Santa Barbara. In 1893, Stevens was the first in California publish a nursery catalog solely for tropical and subtropical plant material. Stevens established an irrigation system for the property to sustain the gardens. Stevens sold part of the property. Going from the original (98 acres-40 ha) down to the currently (37 acres- 5 ha). In September 1896 Stevens died of a heart attack, leaving the property to his wife, Caroline. She opened the gardens up as a guest ranch and later leased the property to a local school.

In 1913 the property was sold to George Owen Knapp. who was buying up other properties in the Montecito area.

In 1916 the estate was sold to the Gavit family, from Albany, New York, who renamed it "Cuesta Linda". The Gavit family added landscape elements, garden structures, and the main residence designed in 1919 by Reginald Johnson in the Mediterranean Revival style. The Gavits hired Peter Riedel and Kinton Stevens' son, Ralph to renovate the gardens while the residence was being built. In 1921–1927 they commissioned additional buildings and alterations to the residence in the Spanish Colonial Revival style from George Washington Smith. Smith's work includes the water garden pool house, stable, and the distinctive pink walls of the estate.

The gardens were created over four decades by opera singer Madame Ganna Walska, who owned the property as a private residence from 1941 until her death in 1984. Originally she purchased the property with her then husband, Theos Bernard, and renamed the property "Tibetland". They selected this name as they intended to invite Tibetan monks to live on the property.

Shortly after purchasing the property she hired the landscape architect Lockwood DeForest Jr. He spent time editing the garden spaces to as per Madame Walska requests. DeForest designed the front lawn of the residence building. Changing it from a traditional landscape to one filled with golden barrel cacti. Many of these mature cacti were taking from the nearby estate of John Wright. Madame Walska also requested that he transform the stables to a music studio. In 1942 DeForest's work on the property ended when he joined the US army.

In 1943 Madame Walska hired Ralph Stevens, Superintendent of Parks for Santa Barbara, to consult on landscape designs for her estate. In 1946 Madame Walska and Bernard divorced. She kept the property and renamed it "Lotusland". During this time Stevens main job was to purchase plant material and supervising the installation process. In 1947 Paddock Pool constructed a new swimming pool designed by Stevens. This was requested by Madame Walska because she wanted a modernize pool, but was told by consulted pool experts that the existing pool could not be converted. The following year Stevens got to work designing a grotto and the Theatre Garden. In he's last few years working for Madame Walska, Stevens final projects where creating The Blue Garden and the floral clock found in The Topiary Garden. In 1955, Stevens retired.

Between 1953 and 1956 Madame Walska managed the conversion of the old swinging pool to its current day statue of a water garden. During this process she consulted J.T. Charleson, who worked at Tricker Water Garden. Oswald da Ros was a stonemason hired by Madame Walska. Ros collected many of the rocks and crystals found around the property. Most notably he brought the blue slag glass from the Arrowhead Water Company to the garden, which now lines a number of the path ways around the gardens.

The garden was opened to the public in 1993.

== Gardens ==
The Lotusland estate grounds contain several distinct gardens, including:

=== The Aloe Garden ===
160 species of aloe and 85 species of euphorbias are located in this garden. Some of the plant specimen were brought over from South Africa, Madagascar, and Yemen. At the center of this garden is a kidney shaped pool, which features a large collection of abalone shells and a fountain created out of giant clam shells.

=== The Blue Garden ===
First created in 1948, this garden features plants with silvery to blue-gray foliage. Plant specimens include; Blue Atlas Cedar (Cedrus libani var. atlantica 'Glauca'), 130 specimens of the rare Chilean wine palms (Jubaea chilensis), blue fescue (Festuca ovina var. glauca), blue chalk sticks(Senecio mandraliscae), Mexican blue palm (Brahea armata), Queensland kauri (Agathis robusta), bunya-bunya (Araucaria bidwillii), hoop pine (Araucaria cunninghamii) and two camphor trees (Cinnamomum camphora). The pathways in this garden are lined with chunks of blue-green glass, that Ganna purchased from a local bottle factory.

=== The Bromeliad Garden ===
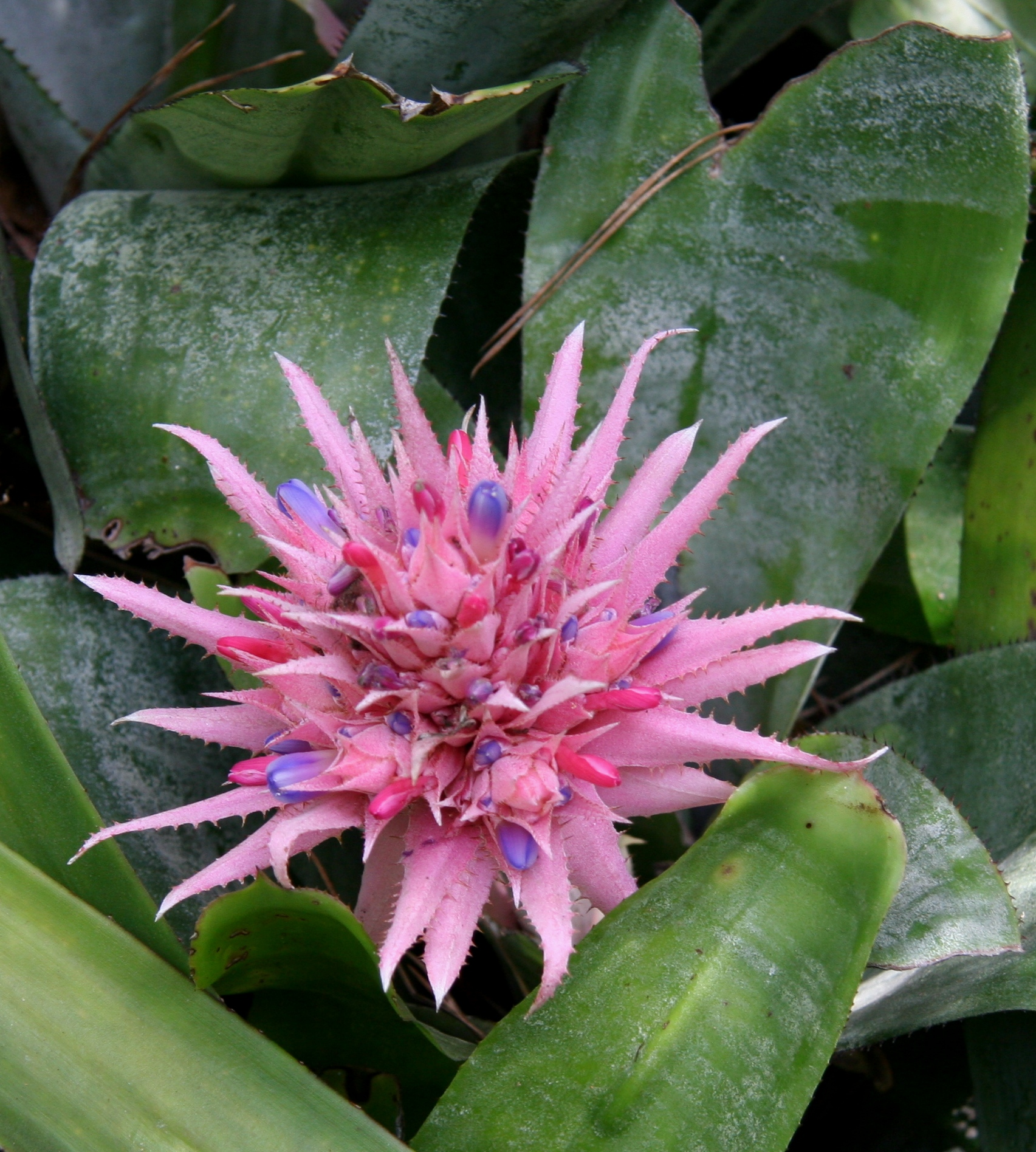
Aechmea fasciata at Lotusland

This garden has bromeliads covering the ground between large coast live oaks (Quercus agrifolia). Other notable plants include a branched pygmy date palm (Phoenix roebelinii), Trithrinax brasiliensis palms and giant ponytail palms (Beaucarnea recurvata).

=== Butterfly gardens ===
This garden space features varieties of flowering plants that support butterflies and other insects.

=== The Cactus Garden ===
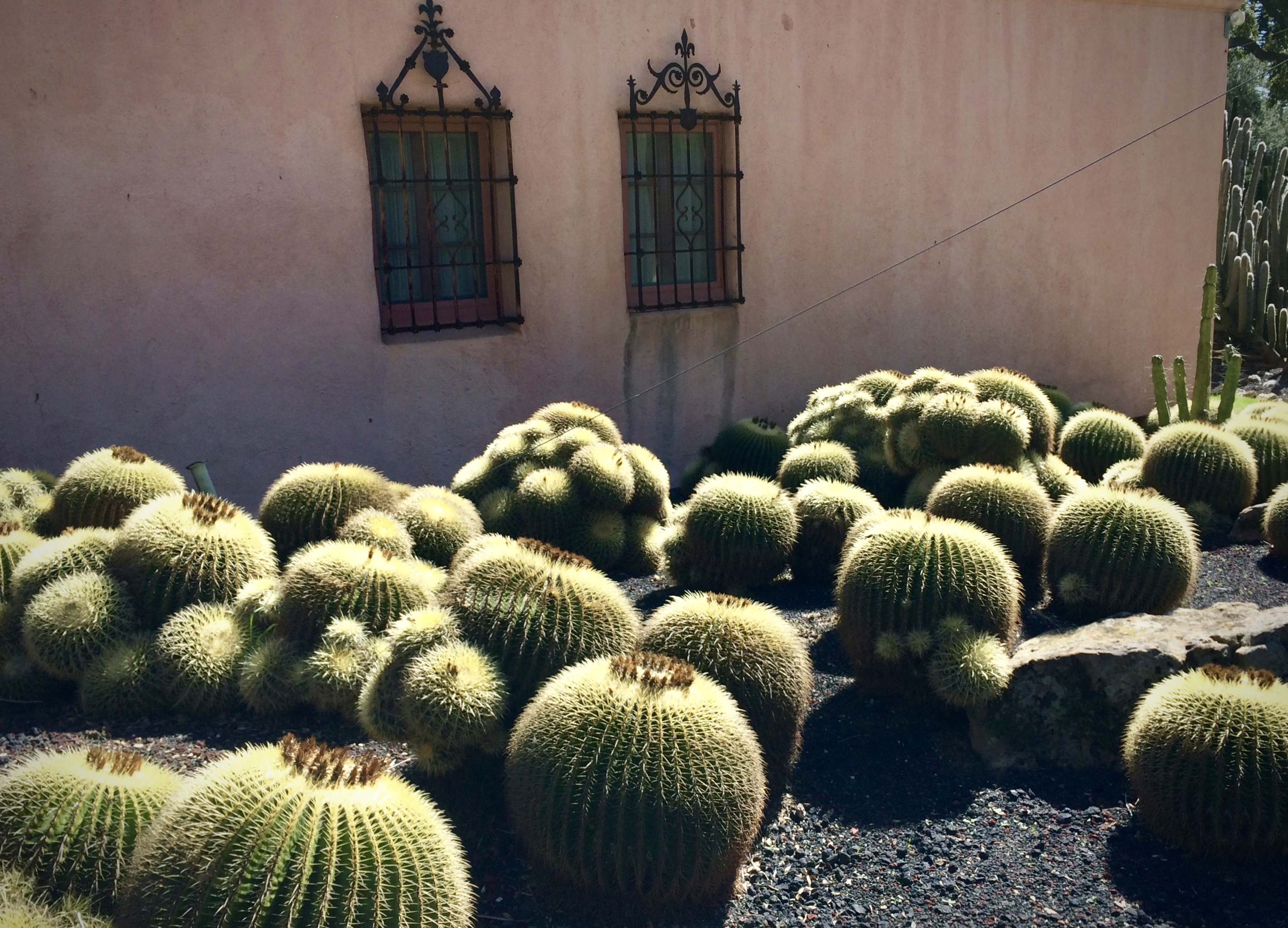
Golden Barrel cacti at Lotusland, 2017

The Cactus Garden featuring a collection of columnar cacti begun in 1929 by Merritt Dunlap. This garden has over 500 plants, representing about 300 different species of cacti in geographically organized groups. Notable specimens include species of Opuntia from the Galapagos Islands, Armatocereus from Peru and a complete collection of the genus Weberbauerocereus. Accent plants include Fouquieria columnaris (boojum tree), dry-growing bromeliads and several Agave species. In 1966 a cacti collector promised Ganna Walska his collection be given to her for Lotusland after his death. It wasn't until after Walska's death that the cacti collection was given to Lotusland in 2001. The garden was designed by Eric Nagelmann and reopened in 2004. A recent addition to the garden in 2014 completed Nagelmann's design.

=== Cacti and euphorbias gardens ===
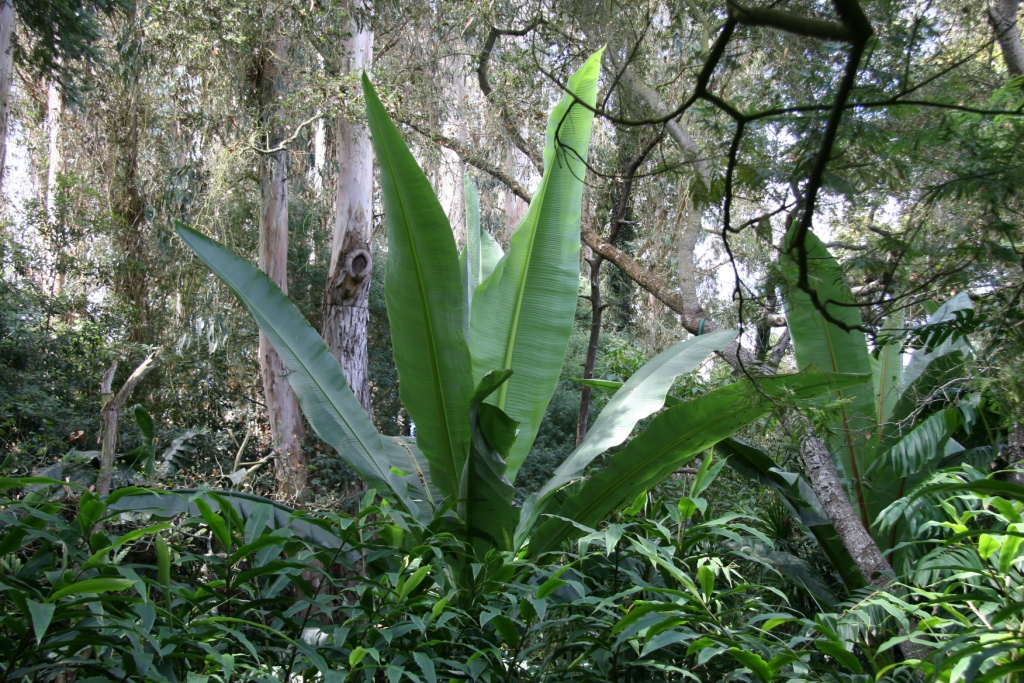
Abyssinian Banana (Ensete ventricosum) at Lotusland

The main house is located right next to these gardens. There is a collection of cacti and euphorbias, including a mass of golden barrel cacti (Echinocactus grusonii) and large, weeping Euphorbia ingens planted on either side of the house's front door.

=== The Cycad Garden ===
The Cycad Garden was originally completed in 1979 with a collection of over 200 species of cycads. The collection has since expanded to over 900 specimens of cycads, with nine of the eleven living genera and more than half of the known species represented. The collection includes three Encephalartos woodii, among the world's rarest cycads and extinct in the wild. These can be found beside a reflecting pool.

=== Fern gardens ===
Featuring many types of ferns, such as Australian Tree Ferns (Sphaeropteris cooperi) and giant staghorn ferns (Platycerium). Other shade-loving plants such as angel trumpet tree (Brugmansia), calla lily (Zantedeschia), clivia hybrids and a collection of Hawaiian Pritchardia palms are present.

=== The Japanese Garden ===
A small Shinto shrine surrounded by Sugi (Cryptomeria japonica), Coast Redwood (Sequoia sempervirens cv. 'Santa Cruz'), a wisteria arbor, Japanese Maples (Acer palmatum), camellias, azaleas and several species of pine pruned in the Niwaki style.

=== Orchards collections ===
- Citrus orchard (oranges, lemons, limes, kumquat, grapefruit, and guava)
- Deciduous orchard, with 100 fruit trees (including peach, plum, apple, pear, persimmon and fig) and olive trees from the 1880s.

=== The Theatre Garden ===
The garden consists of a circular 4 tier lawn space. with the focal point being a 'stage' on the lowest level, with a backdrop of a hedge. 3 of the tiers are lined with sandstone benches for the audience. A number of stone statues are placed around this garden depicting characters from William Shakespeare's writings.

=== The Parterre Garden ===
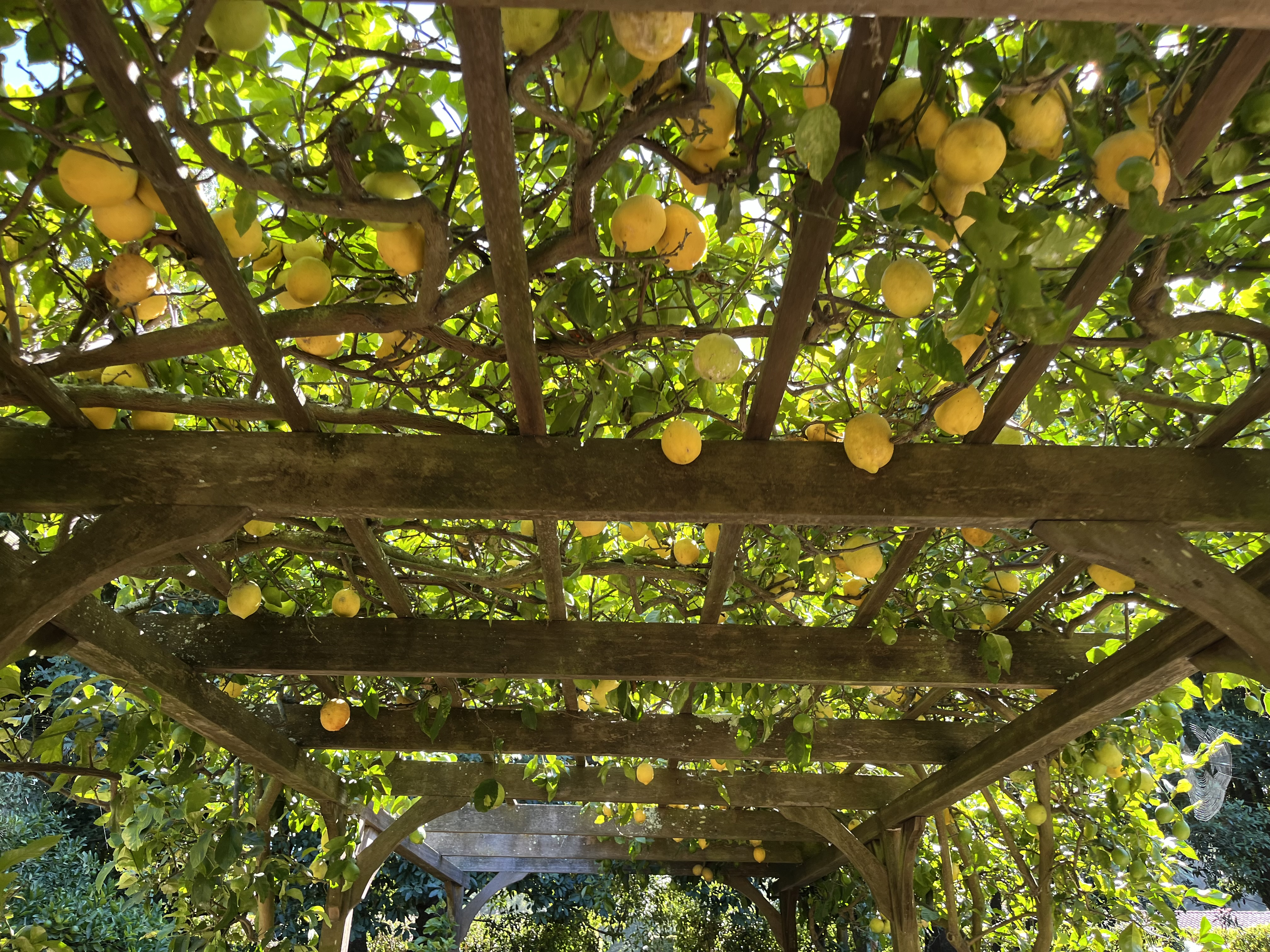
Lemon tree (Citrus x limon) at Lotusland

Formal planting beds and brick walkways with two central water features. Plantings include hedges, floribunda roses, and day lilies.

=== Succulent gardens ===
This garden includes a variety of succulents including Madagascar Palm (Pachypodium lamerei), Aeonium, Fouquieria, Kalanchoe, Echeveria, Haworthia, Yucca and Sansevieria.

=== The Topiary Garden ===
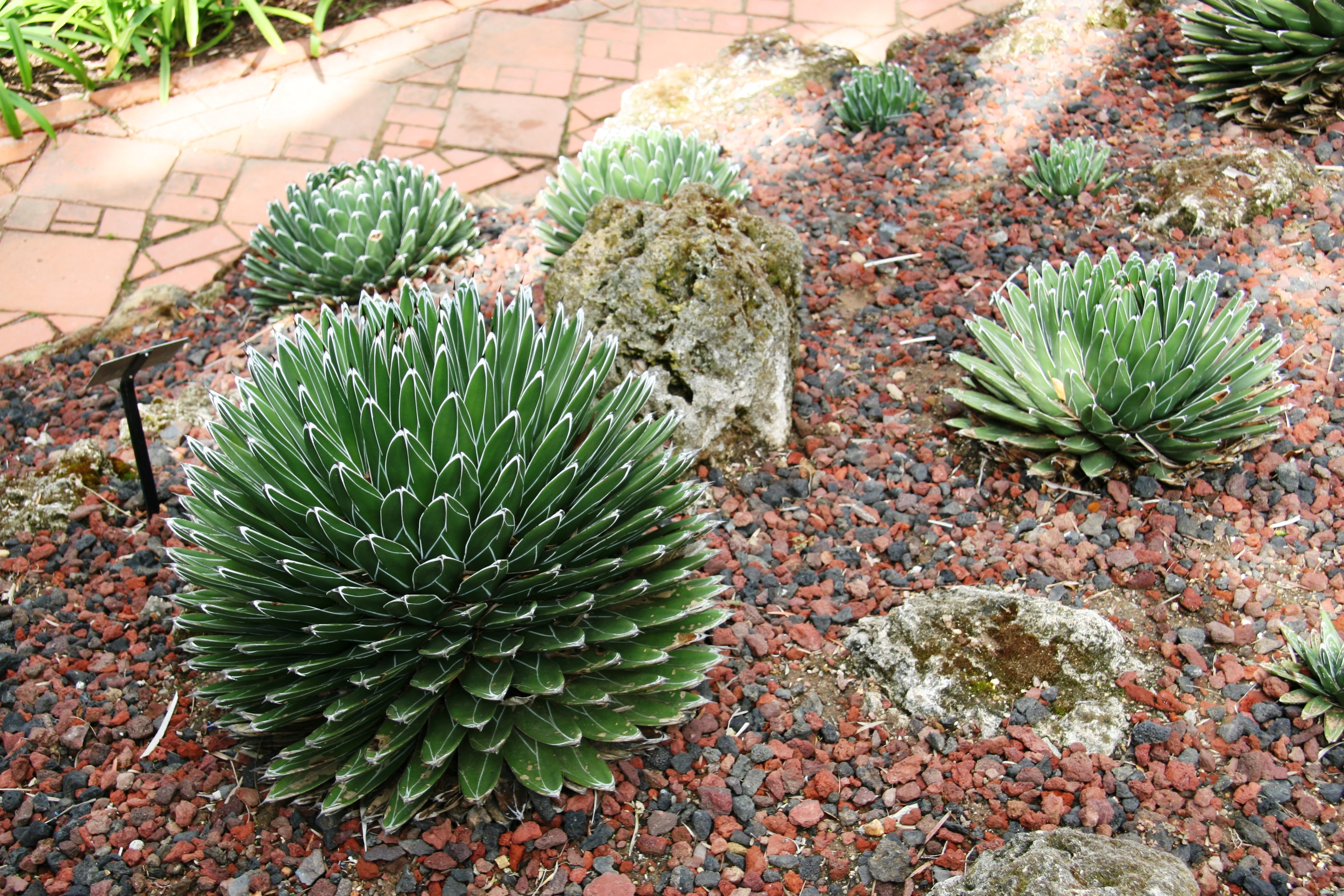
Agave victoriae-reginae at Lotusland

Featuring a horticultural clock 25 feet (8 m) in diameter, bordered by Senecio mandraliscae; a boxwood maze; and a "zoo" of 26 topiary animals, including a camel, gorilla, giraffe and seal. Other frames are shaped as chess pieces and geometric shapes. Lotusland received an anonymous $1 million gift to put towards the topiary garden in 2014.

=== Tropical gardens ===
Featuring orchid cacti (Epiphyllum), gingers (both Alpinia and Hedychium) and bananas both ornamental (Ensete) and edible (Musa).

=== The Water Garden ===
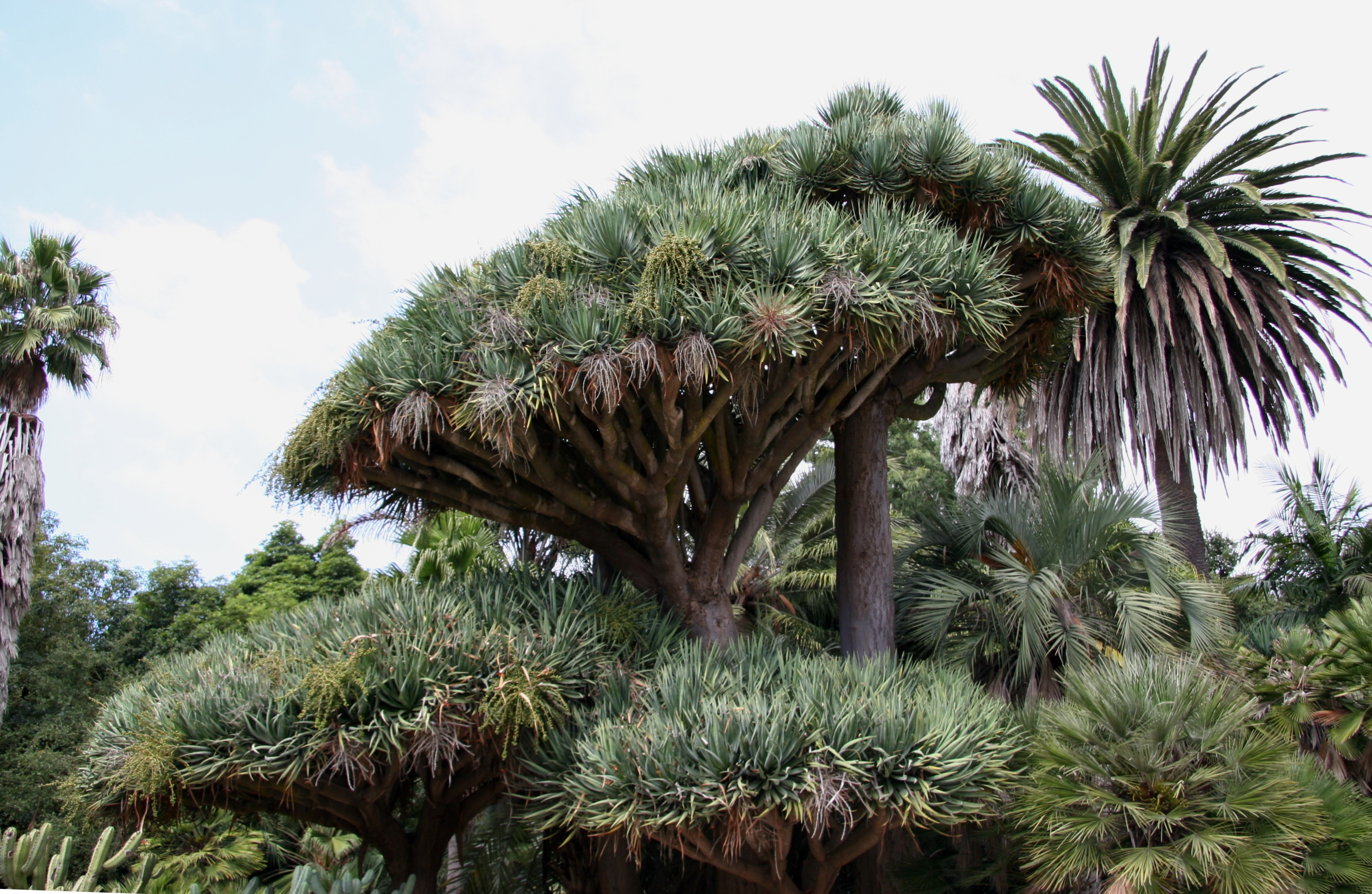
Dracaena draco at Lotusland

Includes several species and cultivars of Indian lotus (Nelumbo nucifera) and water lily (Nymphaea, Euryale ferox, Nuphar, Victoria). There is also bog gardens featuring taro (Colocasia esculenta), ornamental sugar cane (Saccharum cv.) and papyrus.

== Lotusland Celebrates ==
Lotusland Celebrates is a major annual fundraiser for Ganna Walska Lotusland. The annual event often includes celebrity hosts, special guests, dining, garden walks, and high-value luxury auctions.

Year	Event	Description
1995	Twilight with Madama Butterfly	The first Lotusland Celebrates gala, celebrating Ganna Walska's career in opera. The event featured imagery based on an Erté costume design and incorporated the operatic theme into the evening's presentation.
1996	The Marriage of Figaro	The second annual gala used a wedding theme inspired by Mozart's opera The Marriage of Figaro, with a formal dinner and theatrical elements.
1997	The Diva	A gala celebrating the art and designs of Erté, incorporating costumes, visual art and a performance of Rossini's Il viaggio a Reims into an Italian-themed evening.
1998	Tibetland	The event revisited Ganna Walska's original name for her Montecito estate and highlighted her collection of Tibetan art
1999	Alice in Lotusland	The event was held but specific details are unclear.
2000	Lotusland Celebrates	The event was held but a theme is unclear.
2001	1920s	The event celebrated the 1920s and the era associated with the Gavit family, when the Main House and many of Lotusland's formal gardens were created, while also drawing on Walska's life in Paris during the early twentieth century.
2002	Gardens of Enchantment	A fantasy-themed celebration centered on the gardens and the magical qualities of the Lotusland landscape.
2003	Lotusland Celebrates	The event was held but a theme is unclear.
2004	Lotusland Celebrates	The event was held but a theme is unclear.
2005	Wizard of LotOZland	A Wizard of Oz-inspired celebration transformed the garden into an Emerald City-style fantasy, with the Yellow Brick Road and characters including Dorothy, Toto, the Tin Man, the Scarecrow and the Cowardly Lion.
2006	The Summer of Love	The garden was transformed into a celebration of the sights and sounds of 1967, with Ganna Walska's persona reimagined within the cultural style of the era.
2007	Peter Pan's Lotusland	A Neverland-themed gala transformed Lotusland into a fantasy setting inspired by J. M. Barrie's Peter Pan. The event was later described by Lotusland as its most successful celebration to that point.
2008	Out of Lotusland: An African Adventure	An African-themed celebration that presented the garden as the setting for an imaginative journey through African landscapes and culture.
2009	Our Secret Gardens	The gala used the concept of hidden or secret gardens as its central theme, inviting guests to experience the garden through a series of surprises and intimate settings.
2010	Candyland at Lotusland	The gala adopted the visual language of the board game Candy Land, creating a candy-themed fantasy within Lotusland.
2011	Dreams of a Diva	A diva-themed celebration drawing on Lotusland's association with Ganna Walska, who pursued a career as an opera singer before creating the garden.
2012	Ooh La La! Lotusland	A French- and Paris-inspired celebration reflecting Walska's longstanding connection to France and her life in Paris.
2013	Romancing the Garden	The gala followed the romantic and matrimonial history of Ganna Walska and ultimately presented Lotusland itself as her greatest love.
2014	Once Upon a Time	A fairy-tale and fantasy-themed gala incorporating stories, mystery and theatrical elements into the garden setting. The event became one of Lotusland's most successful fundraisers up to that time.
2015	Passage to India	The celebration explored India's influence on Ganna Walska and featured Indian-inspired music, dance, art and garden experiences. It became Lotusland's most successful fundraiser to that point.
2016	Gods & Goddesses	A mythology-inspired celebration presented the garden through the imagery of gods and goddesses, particularly drawing on Greek mythology.
2017	Avant Garden	A fashion- and art-oriented celebration inspired by the idea of the avant-garde. The event included Valentino fashions, contemporary art, music, ballet and displays of rare automobiles and pianos.
2018	Gems of the Garden / Lotus Rising	A dual-themed celebration highlighting Lotusland's rare plants as "gems" of the garden while also celebrating the resilience of the Lotusland community following the 2017 wildfires and debris flows. The event incorporated the Lotus Rising concept and an exhibition by artist Russell Young.
2019	Memoirs of a Garden	A Japanese-themed celebration held in conjunction with the reopening of the Japanese Garden, featuring Japanese dance, taiko, bonsai, origami, koto music and a partnership with Italian fashion house Etro.
2020	Beyond the Pink Wall	During the COVID-19 pandemic, Lotusland replaced its traditional in-person gala with its first virtual Lotusland Celebrates event, accompanied by an online auction and hosted programming.
2021	Petal to the Metal	An automobile-themed celebration featuring a curated car exhibition alongside the garden's art, entertainment and fundraising activities.
2022	Birdsong	Inspired by Randall Poster's The Birdsong Project, the gala focused on birds and bird habitat through art, music, dance and garden installations, including architectural birdhouses. The event raised more than $700,000, at the time the highest net income in the event's history.
2023	Where the Wild Things Grow	The 30th-anniversary celebration emphasized Lotusland's unusual and exotic plants, incorporating botanical surprises, herb-infused cocktails, an outdoor dinner and live and online auctions.
2024	The Way of the Lotus '	A celebration centered on the lotus flower and Asian influences within the garden. The evening included art, dance and music, including works inspired by fallen trees, and featured Alice Waters as a special guest. The event raised more than $1 million.
2025	Jardin des Rêves	The 31st annual gala transformed Lotusland into a dreamlike French-inspired garden, with theatrical vignettes, a butterfly release, themed entertainment and live and silent auctions.
2026	Botanical Splendor '	The most recent Lotusland Celebrates gala, held in July 2026, continued the annual tradition with a botanical-themed celebration hosted by Jane Lynch and featuring Martha Stewart as a special guest.

== See also ==
- List of botanical gardens in the United States
- North American Plant Collections Consortium
- Ganna Walska
