= Marjorie Lawrence =

Australian soprano singer (1907–1979)

Marjorie Florence Lawrence
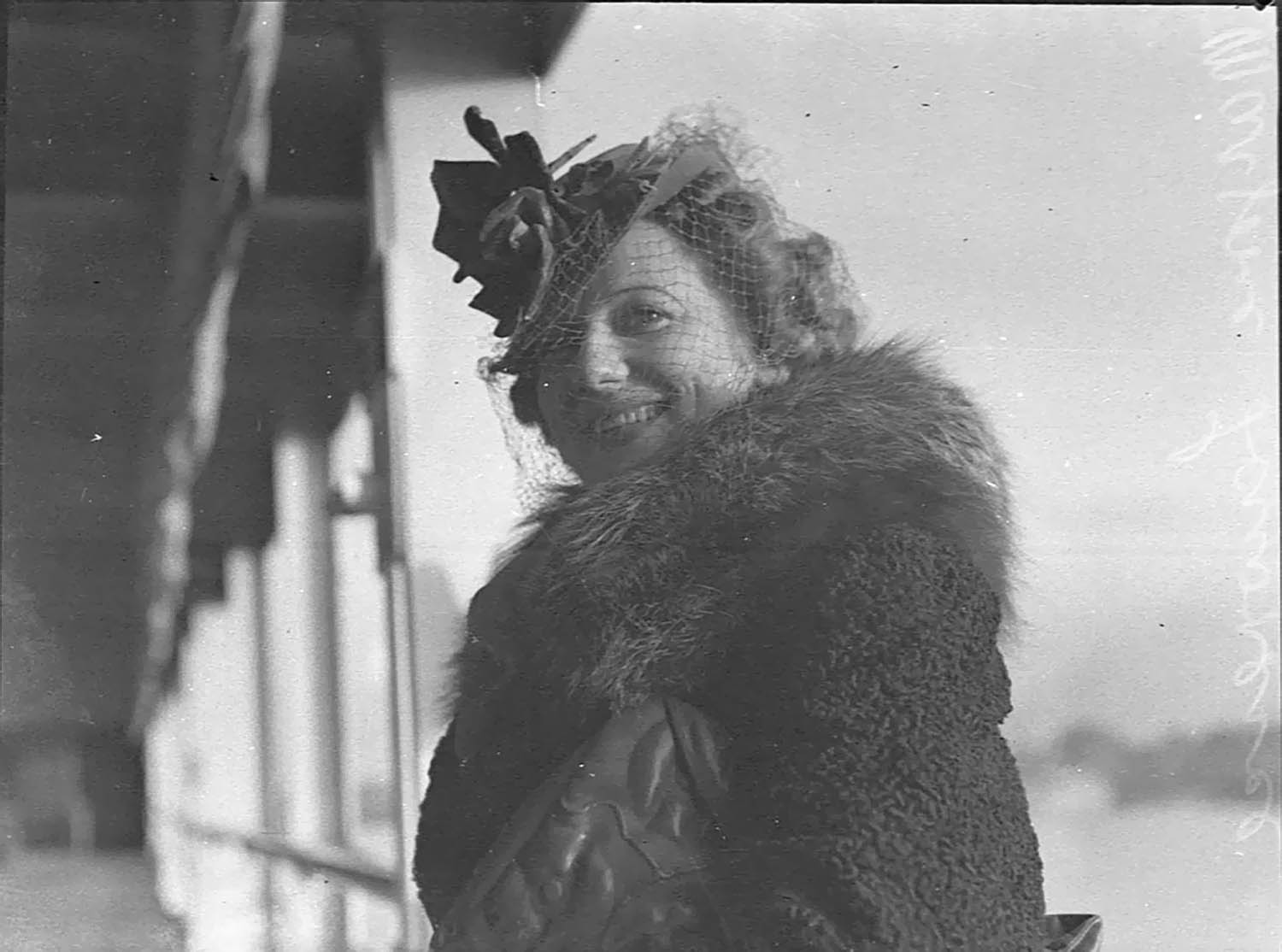
- Marjorie Lawrence, Sydney, Australia, 1939
- Born: 17 February 1907; Deans Marsh, Victoria, Australia
- Died: 13 January 1979 (aged 71)
- Occupation: Dramatic Soprano
- Known for: interpreter of Richard Wagner's operas

Marjorie Florence Lawrence CBE (17 February 1907 – 13 January 1979) was an Australian dramatic soprano, particularly noted as an interpreter of Richard Wagner's operas. She was the first Metropolitan Opera soprano to perform the immolation scene in Götterdämmerung by riding her horse into the flames as Wagner had intended. She was afflicted by polio from 1941. Lawrence later served on the faculty of the School of Music at Southern Illinois University Carbondale.

Her life story was told in the 1955 film Interrupted Melody, in which she was portrayed by Eleanor Parker, who was nominated for the Academy Award for Best Actress for her performance as Lawrence.

== Early life ==
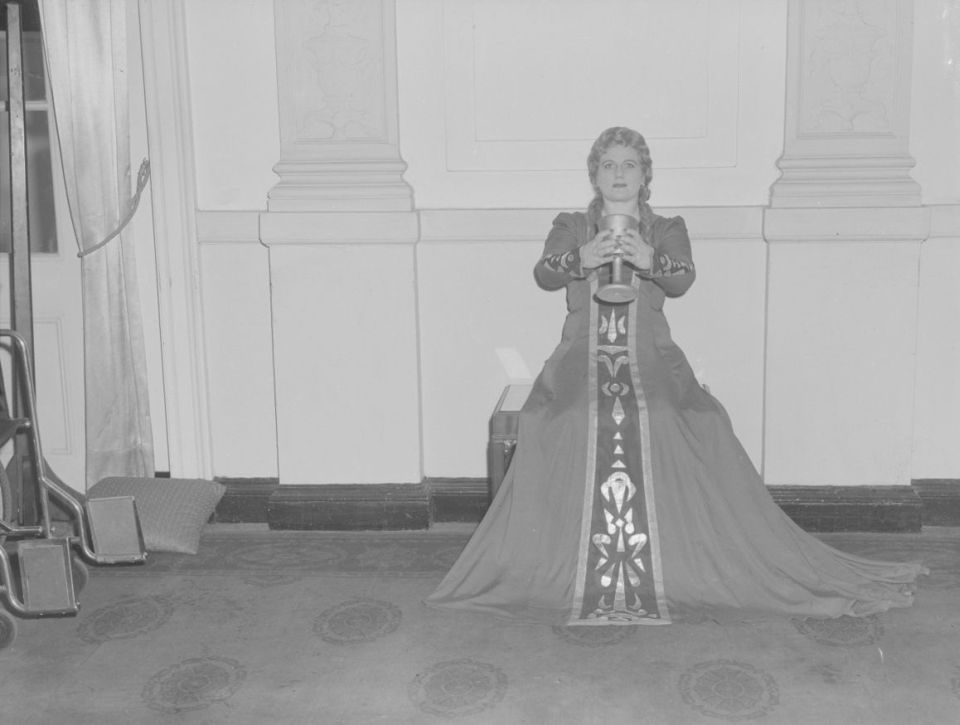
Marjorie Lawrence in 1943, most likely in Montreal

Lawrence was born at Deans Marsh, 135 km (84 mi) southwest of Melbourne. She was the fifth of six children of William Lawrence, the local butcher, and Elizabeth (née Smith) Lawrence, church organist. Her mother died when Lawrence was two and she was raised by her father's mother. Lawrence attended local schools, joined the choir at St Paul's Church of England and was a soloist by age ten. Her interest in opera was sparked by gramophone records of Nellie Melba and Clara Butt. She won a number of vocal competitions when aged in her teens, and at the age of 18 she travelled to Melbourne for work. She received voice lessons from Ivor Boustead but had to return home due to financial hardship. Lawrence failed to gain a place at the Royal South Street competitions in Ballarat but went on to win the Sun Aria at Geelong in 1928. Australian baritone John Brownlee advised her to study in Paris with Cécile Gilly. Lawrence boarded with a French family and, under Gilly's tuition, was able to extend her voice's upper range.

== Career ==
In January 1932, Lawrence made her operatic debut in Monte Carlo as Elisabeth in Richard Wagner's Tannhäuser. On 25 February 1933, she made her first appearance at the Opera Garnier in Paris, singing Ortrud in Lohengrin, and in the same year she sang in the world premiere of Joseph Canteloube's Vercingétorix.

On 18 December 1935, she made her debut at the Metropolitan Opera in New York City singing Brünnhilde in Die Walküre, and the following year performed the immolation scene in Götterdämmerung by riding her horse into the flames as Wagner had intended, the first Metropolitan Opera soprano to do so. She had been an athletic child and learned to ride in Australia. In this famous performance, Lauritz Melchior was her Siegfried. The performance was recorded and is the only complete Götterdämmerung with Melchior as Siegfried on record.

Lawrence's physicality and beauty made her popular with audiences – she performed the "Dance of the Seven Veils" in Richard Strauss's Salome more convincingly than most other sopranos. Just as Lawrence's great compatriot Florence Austral had been able to alternate the role of Brünnhilde with Frida Leider, she herself was able to alternate the role with Kirsten Flagstad at the Metropolitan in 1937. She turned down a small role in the premiere of George Enescu's opera Œdipe in 1938, which caused her fellow Australian (by adoption) Hephzibah Menuhin (a close friend of Enescu's) to consider the soprano "snobbish and petty".

Lawrence returned to Australia periodically from 1939, where English critic Neville Cardus wrote of the "'unselfconscious pathos' and 'intimate poetry' in her performances, of the 'superb range' of her powerful voice, 'rich in vocal splendour' throughout".

In 1939 it was announced she would play Dame Nellie Melba in the film The Life of Melba for Australia's Cinesound Productions. However the film never materialised due to the war.

On 29 March 1941, at New York City's City Hall, she married Dr. Thomas King, an osteopath and Christian Scientist.

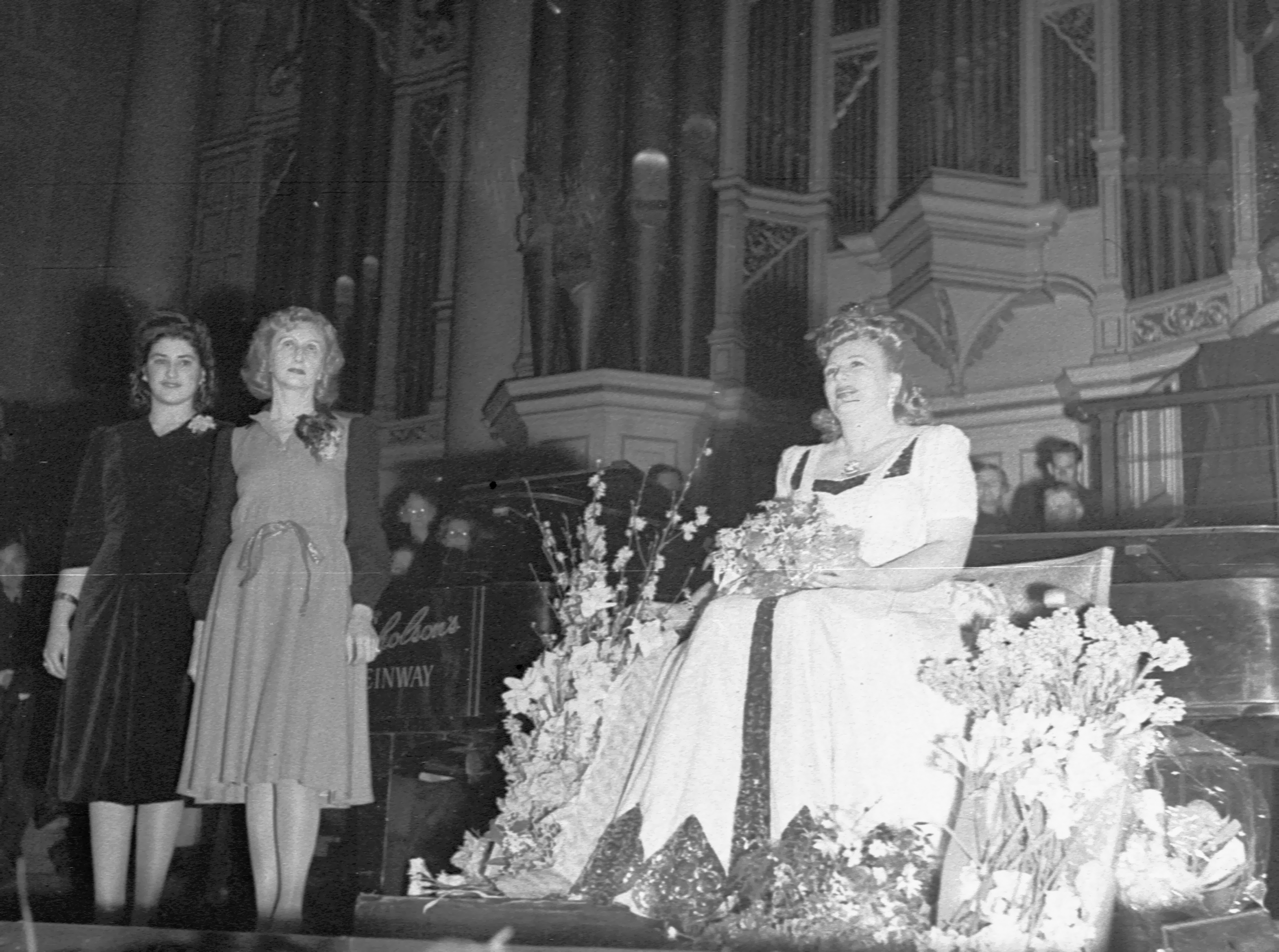
Marjorie Lawrence at Sydney Town Hall, Australia, c. 1944

During a performance in 1941 in Mexico, Lawrence found herself unable to stand—she had polio. She undertook the Sister Kenny treatment of muscle stimulation for paralysis in both legs. She returned to the stage 18 months later, performing in a chair, reclining or on a special platform; although hampered by her lack of mobility, she continued to perform until 1952. In 1944, during World War II, she performed in charity concerts to entertain troops in Australia, seated in a chair. A performance as Amneris in Giuseppe Verdi's Aida in Paris in 1946 was well received as were concert appearances of Richard Strauss's Elektra in December 1947 with the Chicago Symphony Orchestra and Artur Rodziński, but Lawrence left the stage, and instead began to work as a teacher. She retired to her ranch, Harmony Hills, in Hot Springs, Arkansas where she taught international students. She later accepted students from the University of Arkansas at Little Rock from the late 1970s until her death in 1979.

Although best known for her Wagnerian interpretations, Lawrence sang a range of other works, including Salome and Georges Bizet's Carmen. She made a number of excellent recordings, mainly of works by Wagner. She received many good reviews throughout her career. She had a solid career in France, Mexico, Australia and throughout South America, as well as the US. However, she was unable to build a substantial career in other parts of the world due to World War II, when her voice was prime. In 1946 she was awarded the cross of the Légion d'honneur for her work in France.

In 1949, Lawrence wrote her autobiography Interrupted Melody; by February 1950, Hollywood was interested in making a film and Lawrence indicated "If a film is made I will do the singing". In 1955, Metro-Goldwyn-Mayer released the film version, Interrupted Melody, starring Eleanor Parker as Lawrence; Parker loved opera and learned to sing all of the arias, although her singing was later dubbed in by soprano Eileen Farrell. Lawrence criticised the film as being untrue to her life.

Lawrence died, aged 71, of heart failure on 13 January 1979 at St Vincent's Hospital, Little Rock, Arkansas, and was buried in Greenwood Cemetery in Hot Springs, where she had made her home for many years.

== Honours ==
In 1946, she was awarded the cross of the Légion d'honneur for her work in France. In 1976, she was appointed a Commander of the Order of the British Empire on the recommendation of the Government of Australia.
