= Beverly Park, Los Angeles =

Neighborhoods of Los Angeles, California, United States of America

Coordinates: 34°07′18″N 118°25′05″W

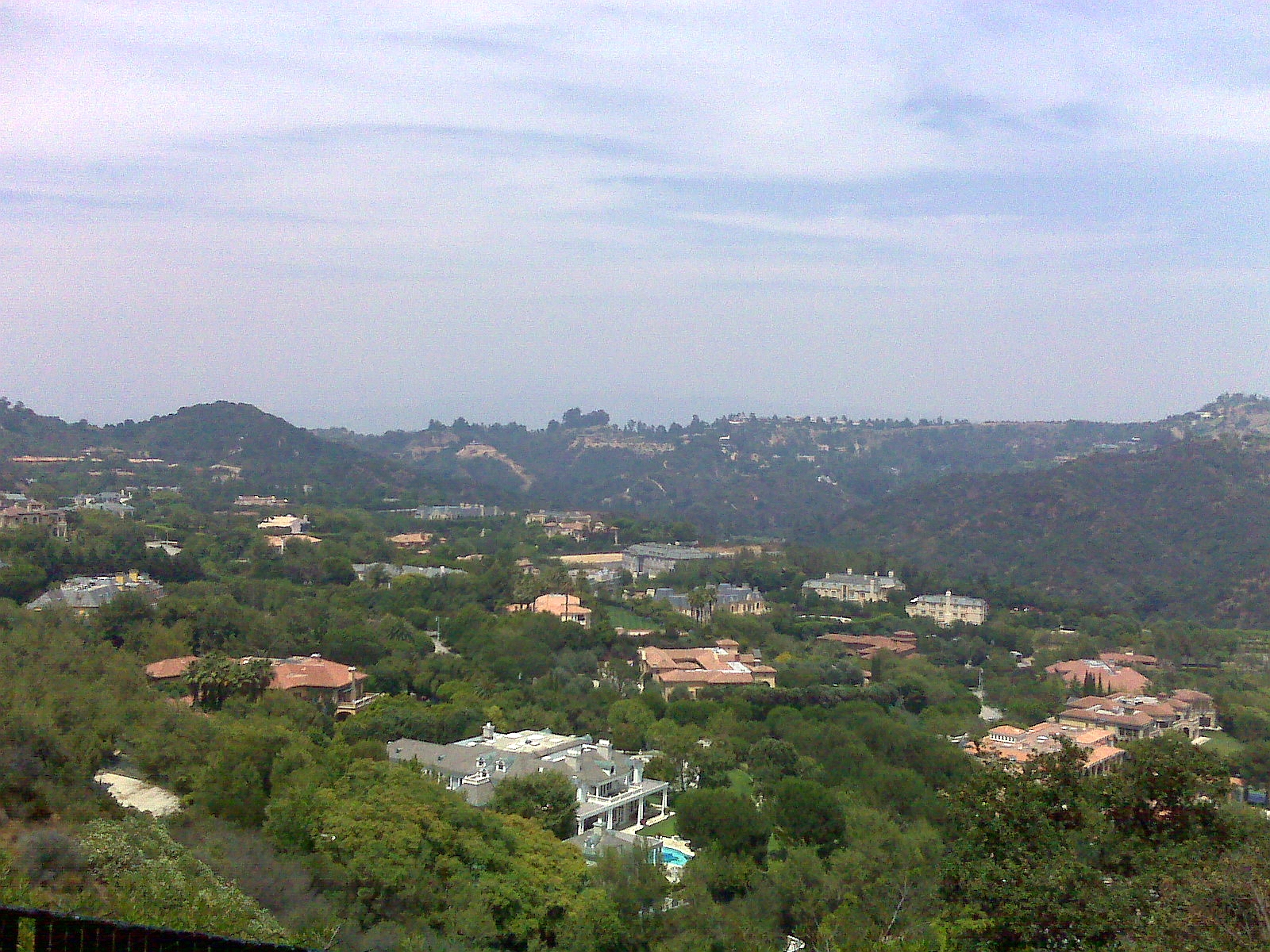
North Beverly Park as seen from a ridge overlooking it near San Ysidro Drive.

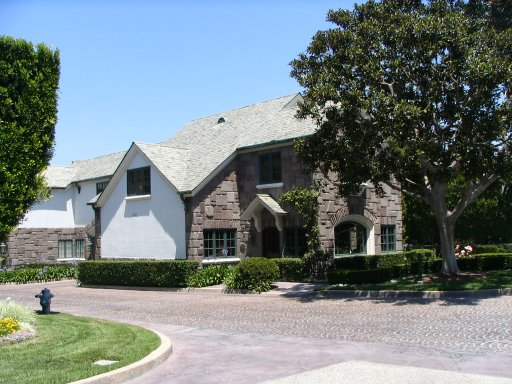
The Beverly Park gatehouse at Summitridge

Beverly Park, divided into North Beverly Park and South Beverly Park, is a gated community in Los Angeles, California primarily known for its large houses and famous residents. It is between Mulholland Drive and Sunset Boulevard and Coldwater Canyon Drive and Beverly Glen Boulevard, east of the Beverly Glen neighborhood.

The communities have a Beverly Hills Post Office address (90210 ZIP Code), but are located in the city of Los Angeles. North Beverly Park, with a main entrance at 13100 Mulholland Drive, is the larger 64-home section, while South Beverly Park has 16 homes. Property covenants require that homes in Beverly Park be at least 5,000 square feet.

Beverly Park is the highest-earning neighborhood in Los Angeles, with a mean household income of $502,440. Photography is prohibited.

== History ==
As early as the 1960s, the area was under development as "a golf course and country club, named after Dean Martin." By 1979, developers Elliot Gottfurcht and Brian Adler, together with private investors, developed South Beverly Park as "an idyllic community of historic-feeling grand estates that would feel like Beverly Hills of yesteryear." The project was completed in 1990 as a 250-acre (100 ha) guard gated community. Adler used the concept of having gates to distinguish the neighborhood from other Westside neighborhoods of Beverly Hills, Holmby Hills, and Bel-Air. It originally contained 64 two-acre (0.81 ha) lots, a four-acre (1.6 ha) landscaped park, and over 100 acres (40 hectares) of open space; a number of adjacent lots have since been developed. Beverly Park is divided into two separate communities, one being North Beverly Park, the other South Beverly Park. North Beverly Park is a larger community and most homes there generally commanded much larger prices than homes of South Beverly Park.

In May 2009, residents of South Beverly Park sued the North Beverly Park Homeowners Association over access to the north's two gates at Mulholland Drive after access was restricted in 2007. Residents of South Beverly Park could use the gate, but visitors were forced to use the south's gates, which, due to the location of the neighborhood, could require a detour of up to seven miles (11 km). The dispute arose in March 2006 when the north's Homeowners Association sent the south's homeowners a letter demanding that they "pay their fair share of costs we [the north association] are incurring for maintenance of the roads, gates, and security" for an amount specified at $121,000 a year. The south's residents rejected the demand, and a series of legal correspondence followed that resulted in the north's raising the amount it sought to $128,000. In May 2007, the north informed the south neighbors that their relatives, "staff, vendors, and guests" would no longer be allowed to enter the north's gates at Summitridge and Mulholland Drives. On January 13, 2009, Judge Norman P. Tarle ruled in favor of the South Beverly Park Homeowners Association, giving them the right to regain full use of the northern gates and their friends, guests, and vendors would no longer have to take the seven-mile detour. The North Beverly Park HOA later filed an appeal to the decision, but the judgment was affirmed.

After their lawsuit was won, the South Beverly Park residents were awarded a post-judgment order by the court system, entitling them to compensation from the North's Homeowners' Association for attorney fees and costs totalling $826,926.13. The North Beverly Park HOA filed an appeal to this post-judgment order as well, but again lost when the judgment was affirmed in late 2011. This finally ended a nearly five-year legal battle.

== Crime ==
Despite being a gated community, there have been occasional instances of crime. In February 2007, the Beverly Park home of Tim McGraw and Faith Hill was burglarized. Police stated that the method of entry was believed to be a broken window and an unspecified amount of money was missing. In February 2010, resident Lisa Vanderpump's automobile was stolen from her driveway during the night and driven off a nearby cliff. Former residents Robert and Jeannette Bisno claimed that their gardens had been toilet-papered, trampled, and strewn with debris in 2004, though there was speculation this may have been the doing of another resident(s), as the Bisnos were involved in a dispute with their Homeowners' Association over a sculpture at the time.

== Residents ==
Some notable residents of Beverly Park have included:

- Adele
- Avi Arad
- Justin Bieber
- Barry Bonds
- Larry Flax
- Jami Gertz
- Alec Gores
- Tom Gores
- Steve Harvey
- Samuel L. Jackson
- Magic Johnson
- Bruce Makowsky
- Adrienne Maloof
- Reba McEntire
- Mike Medavoy
- Eddie Murphy
- Paul Nassif
- Prince Rogers Nelson
- Luciana Paluzzi
- Sumner Redstone
- Haim Saban
- Turki bin Nasser Al Saud
- Kimora Lee Simmons
- Eric Smidt
- Rod Stewart
- Paris Hilton
- Sylvester Stallone
- Yife Tien
- Ronald Tutor
- Steven F. Udvar-Házy
- Lisa Vanderpump
- Sofia Vergara
- Mark Wahlberg
- Denzel Washington
- Russell Weiner
- Norm Zada
- Richard Zanuck

== On screen ==
The facade of Lisa Vanderpump's estate in Beverly Park was used in the first season of Schitt's Creek. The French chateau style mansion was damaged by a fire in 2012 and demolished between 2014 and 2015.
