= Gores =

Gores is a surname. Notable people with the name include:

- Alec Gores (born 1953), American billionaire businessman
- Christopher Gores, Puerto Rican soccer player
- Eric Gores (born 1983), son of Alec
- Joe Gores (1931–2011), American mystery writer
- Landis Gores (1919–1991), American architect
- Rudi Gores (born 1957), German football player and coach
- Sam Gores (born 1954), American talent agent
- Tom Gores (born 1964), American billionaire businessman

== See also ==
- Gaps and gores, portions of land areas
- East Gores, hamlet near Colchester, Essex, England
- The Gores Group, private equity firm
- Landis Gores House, historic house in New Canaan, Connecticut
- Gores Island, island in Strangford Lough, County Down, Northern Ireland
- List of gores in Vermont
