= Beverly Crest, Los Angeles =

Beverly Crest
- Neighborhood of Los Angeles
- Location within Los Angeles
- Coordinates: 34°06′05″N 118°24′59″W
- Country: United States
- State: California
- County: Los Angeles
- Time zone: Pacific
- Zip Code: 90210
- Area code: 323

Beverly Crest is a neighborhood in the Santa Monica Mountains, in the Westside area of the city of Los Angeles, California.

== History ==
Developer George Read purchased the 80-acre (32 ha) area in 1923. After the streets were paved and underground utilities and streetlights installed, development began in 1926. The land was subdivided into 178 parcels ranging in size from one-quarter to three-quarters of an acre. Two gatehouses (one of which remains) were constructed at the Schuyler Road entrance. Read installed a sign on the hillside (similar to the Hollywoodland sign) to market the neighborhood as a community of "motion picture celebrities and other notables."

On October 1, 2008, the City of Los Angeles approved the name of Beverly Crest for the neighborhood.

== Geography ==
Beverly Crest is east of Coldwater Canyon Drive and borders the city of Beverly Hills on the east, west and south. According to the Crests Neighborhood Association, Beverly Crest consists of properties located on Lindacrest Drive, Readcrest Drive, Beverlycrest Drive, Lloydcrest Drive, Waynecrest Drive, Gilcrest Drive, Claircrest Drive, Ridgecrest Drive, Cerrocrest Drive, Meadow Drive and 1300-1631 Schuyler Road.

Beverly Crest is included in the Bel Air–Beverly Crest Community Plan area of Los Angeles, which covers the neighborhoods of: Beverly Crest, Bel Air, Benedict Canyon, Beverly Glen, Laurel Canyon, and the northern portion of Holmby Hills).

The name Beverly Crest was officially approved by the city to cover an area that includes the streets of Beverlycrest Drive, Cerrocrest Drive, Claircrest Drive, Gilcrest Drive, Lindacrest Drive, Lloydcrest Drive, Readcrest Drive, Ridgecrest Drive, Waynecrest and Schuyler Road. It lies in Los Angeles census tract 2611.01, block group 2 (as of 2008). The name "Beverly Crest" is sometimes used more broadly to refer to a larger section in the Bel Air–Beverly Crest Community Plan area, in the hills above the city of Beverly Hills.

As mapped by Mapping L.A., the area of Beverly Crest is roughly triangular, with Sherman Oaks to the north, Bel Air to the southwest and the city of Beverly Hills to the southeast. The borders are mapped by the Los Angeles Times to run along Mulholland Drive on the north; Stone Canyon Road to the west, then Beverly Glen Boulevard below Stone Canyon Reservoir to Sunset Boulevard on the far south. The southeastern boundary with Beverly Hills is complex, and most of Beverly Crest lies within the so-called Beverly Hills Post Office, defined as ZIP code 90210 outside the city of Beverly Hills proper. The neighborhood of Hollywood Hills West is nearby on the east.

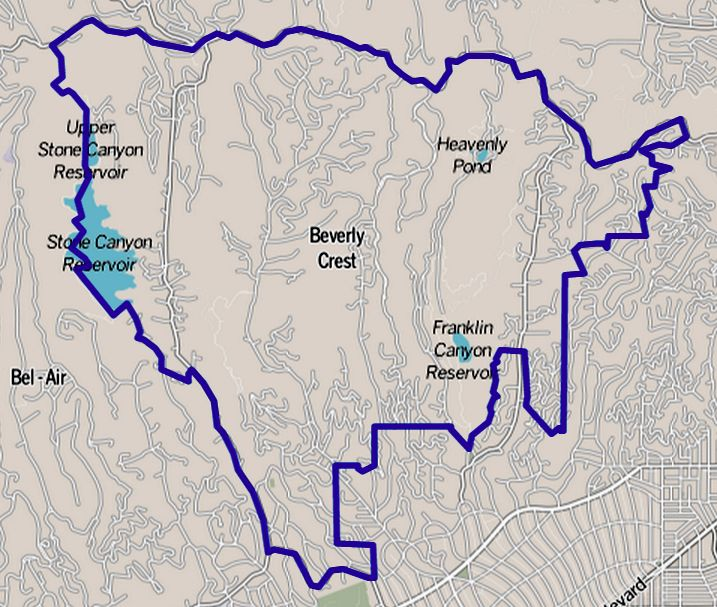
Map of Beverly Crest as delineated by the Los Angeles Times

== Demographics ==
The following data applies to Beverly Crest within the boundaries established by Mapping L.A.:

The 2000 U.S. census counted 10,852 residents in the 8.24-square-mile Beverly Crest neighborhood—or 1,318 people per square mile, among the lowest population densities for the city and the county. In 2008, the city estimated that the population had increased to 11,569. In 2000 the median age for residents was 45, which was high for city and county neighborhoods. The percentages of residents aged 35 and older were among the county's highest.

According to demographic surveys, in 2000 the median age of residents was 45 years old, which made Beverly Crest have one of the highest median ages for any of the neighborhoods in Los Angeles, behind only Century City and Bel-Air.

The Los Angeles Times considered the neighborhood "not especially diverse" ethnically within Los Angeles, given its relatively high percentage of Caucasian residents. The breakdown was whites, 87.5%; Asians, 4.0%; Latinos, 3.4%; blacks 1.7%; other races 3.3%. Iran (28.6%) and the United Kingdom (8.6%) were the most common places of birth for the 25% of the residents who were born abroad—which was an average percentage for Los Angeles as a whole.

The median yearly household income in 2008 dollars was $169,282, considered high for the city and the county. Renters occupied 10% of the housing stock, and house- or apartment-owners held 90%. The average household size of 2.4 people was considered typical for Los Angeles. The 5.6% of families headed by single parents was low for city and county neighborhoods. The percentages of married people in Bel Air were among the county's highest—63.4% for men and 59.5% for women. There were 896 veterans, or 10.2% of the population, a high proportion compared to the rest of the city and county.

More than two-thirds (67.6%) of Beverly Crest residents aged 25 and older had earned a four-year degree by 2000, a high percentage for the city and the county. The percentages of residents in that age range with a bachelor's degree or greater were high for the county.

== Notable residents ==
- Paul Allen - purchased Hudson estate in 1992
- Rock Hudson - 9402 Beverly Crest Drive, named "The Castle"
- John Landis - purchased Hudson estate in 1987
- Drake - purchased in 2022

== See also ==
- List of districts and neighborhoods of Los Angeles
- The Pritzker Estate
