= Paul Tien =

American educator

Paul Shu-Pei Tien (b. ~1938) is an American educator who was born in Tianjin, China and grew up in Taiwan. He emigrated to the United States to pursue graduate education in electrical engineering, and later became a professor of electrical engineering and President of Belmont Technical College in St. Clairsville, Ohio. In January 1978, Tien established the American University of the Caribbean School of Medicine (AUC) on the Caribbean island of Montserrat. AUC is now located on the island of Sint Maarten.

Tien was the chancellor of AUC for 30 years, before retiring to Taiwan in 2003. His son, Yife Tien, is the chancellor of Rocky Vista University College of Osteopathic Medicine.
