= Mulholland Estates =

Gated community in the Santa Monica Mountains, California

Coordinates: 34°08′06″N 118°26′19″W

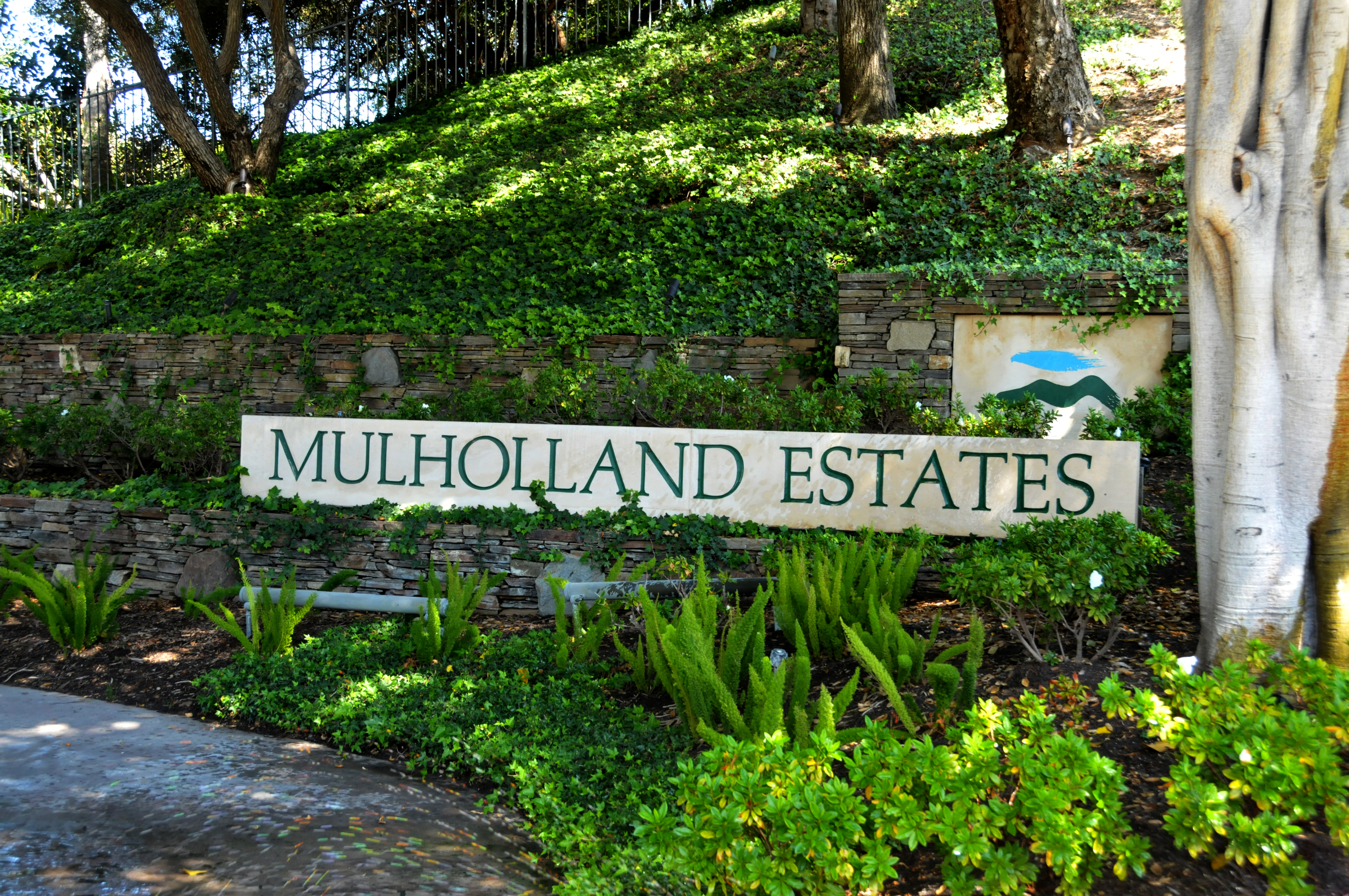
Mulholland Estates sign

Mulholland Estates is a guard gated community in the Santa Monica Mountains of Southern California, US. It is named after pioneering Los Angeles civil engineer William Mulholland. Although properties in the estate have a 90210 ZIP code and thus a Beverly Hills address, it is actually part of the Beverly Hills Post Office area in the city of Los Angeles, with much of the land located inside the Sherman Oaks district. The community's main entrance is located at Beverly Glen Boulevard and Mulholland Drive, next to Fossil Ridge Park, and it looks out to the San Fernando Valley.

Access to Fossil Ridge Park on the community's west side used to be blocked by Mulholland Estates security guards. However, since 2011, members of the public are allowed to drive or walk on Westpark Road, which is inside Mulholland Estates, to have access to the park. However, parking on Westpark Road is not allowed.

The community was developed by Kenneth Kai Chang, with Chang, Alfred E. Mann and Robert A. Sandler as the "primary investors". Chang had planned to build a "luxury restaurant" on Mulholland Drive as well as "100 condominiums and 29 single-family homes", but decided to build 95 luxury homes instead. Fred Sands acted as the original real estate agent. When it was under construction in 1988, it was described as "one of the Valley's biggest and most brash housing developments" by The Los Angeles Times.

It is or has been home to many celebrities such as Christina Aguilera, Paris Hilton, Kendall Jenner, DJ Khaled, Adrienne Maloof, Tyler Perry, Charlie Sheen and Robbie Williams.
