= Fossil Ridge =

Fossil Ridge may refer to

- Fossil Ridge High School (Fort Worth, Texas)
- Fossil Ridge High School (Fort Collins, Colorado)
- Fossil Ridge Park in Los Angeles
- Fossil Ridge Wilderness in Gunnison County, Colorado
- A ridge containing the Walcott Quarry, Yoho National Park, Canada; notable for fossils in the Burgess Shale
