= Yife Tien =

- Born: Yife Tien; April 1955 (age 70); Taiwan
- Education: University of Cincinnati (BA)
- Occupations: Educator, Businessman
- Known for: Founder of RVUCOM
- Board member of: IAOMC
- Spouse: Lucy Chua
- Children: Christopher Tien
- Parent(s): Paul Tien, Ming Tien

Yife Tien (born April 1955) is a Taiwanese-American educator and businessman. He is founder and chancellor of Rocky Vista University College of Osteopathic Medicine, as well as the former chancellor of American University of the Caribbean.

== Early life and career ==
Yife Tien was born in Taiwan to Ming and Paul Tien. In 1964, the family emigrated to America, where they initially settled in Ohio. His mother worked at an electronics company and his father served as president of Belmont College (then known as Belmont Technical College).

Tien graduated from the University of Cincinnati. He then attended Universidad Central del Este with hopes to become a doctor, but dropped out after one year. Shortly after, in 1978, he moved to the Caribbean island of Montserrat to help his father run his newly established for-profit medical school, the American University of the Caribbean (AUC).

By 2003, Paul had retired and moved back to Taiwan, leaving Yife to serve as chancellor and handle AUC's day-to-day operations. He has served as Chief Operating Officer of the school since 1995.

In 2006, Tien founded Rocky Vista University College of Osteopathic Medicine (RVUCOM). He had served as Chancellor until 2019.

In the September 2008 issue of Forbes Magazine, Tien was featured in a four-page spread for his entrepreneurial achievements in the medical education industry.

Tien currently sits on the board of the International Association of Medical Colleges and has served as its treasurer.

Tien is also a real estate investor, with a portfolio of properties both in Florida and California.

In 2011, Tien and his father sold AUC to DeVry for $235 million in an all cash deal. In 2019, Rocky Vista University was acquired from Tien by Medforth Global Healthcare Education for an undisclosed amount.

== Personal life ==
Tien has a younger brother, Henry. Beginning in 2006, Yife and Paul were embroiled in a multi-year legal battle against Henry and Ming (by that time Paul and Ming had divorced). Henry and Ming argued they were entitled to 50% of the AUC enterprise, which Yife and Paul denied. The suit was eventually settled in Yife and Paul's favor.

Tien was a contributor to the 2008 campaign of Mitt Romney for U.S. president.

He is married to Lucy Chua, M.D. The couple have one son named Christopher, who attended the University of Miami.

The family primarily resides at their home in Coral Gables, Florida The couple have two homes in the Beverly Park neighborhood of Beverly Hills, California as well as a beach house in Malibu, California.
