= Imaginary Enemy =

Imaginary Enemy or Imaginary Enemies may refer to:

== Film and TV ==
- Imaginary Enemy, 2010 documentary on sculptor Liao Yibai
- Imaginary Enemies, List of Orange Is the New Black episodes

== Music ==
- Imaginary Enemy (album), 2014 album by The Used and a song from that album
- "Imaginary Enemy", single by Circa Survive on their album Blue Sky Noise
- "Imaginary Enemy", song by Kary Ng from 2006 album With a Boy Like You
