= Billionaire (Los Angeles) =

High-end residence in Bel Air, California, United States

- Interactive map of the Billionaire area

General information
- Type: House
- Architectural style: Contemporary
- Location: 924 Bel Air Road; Los Angeles, California
- Coordinates: 34.089695°N 118.440817°W
- Construction started: 2012
- Completed: 2016
- Governing body: Private

Technical details
- Floor area: 38,000 square feet (3,500 m^{2})

Design and construction
- Architect: Uberion
- Structural engineer: Taylor & Syfan Consulting Engineers

Website
- www.924belair.com

Billionaire is a private residence in the Bel Air neighborhood of Los Angeles, California, United States.

== History ==
The previous home occupying the lot was owned by Hollywood star Judy Garland until 1967. The property was acquired by Bruce Makowsky in May 2012, for US$7.9 million. The structure was built in four years by 250 workers.

== Price ==
Listed in January 2017 at US$250 million, Billionaire was the most expensive house listed for sale at that time in the US. In April 2018 it was relisted for $188 million. In January 2019, its price was cut again to $150 million. It surpassed the Gemini mansion in Manalapan, Florida that was listed at $190 million at the time. The most expensive home ever sold in Los Angeles County was the Playboy Mansion at $100 million, while the record sale in the state of California was $117.5 million. At that time, the most expensive home ever sold in the US was a $147 million East Hampton mansion. In October 2019, the house sold for $94 million.

== Description ==
The house at 924 Bel Air Road consists of 38,000 square feet (3,500 m^{2}) of living space on four levels. It has 12 bedrooms: two master suites and ten large guest suites. The interior contains 21 bathrooms adorned with 50 types of Italian marble, five bars, three kitchens, three dining areas, a fitness center, a wellness spa, a 4-lane bowling alley, a $12,000 glass pool table, and a 360-inch (910 cm) TV, likely the largest residential television set. The $2 million, 40-seat Dolby Atmos James Bond-themed theater has a 22-foot (6.7 m) screen, 57 speakers, and a 4k projector with 7,000 pre-loaded movies. Situated on a 1.08-acre (47,000 sq ft; 4,400 m^{2}) lot, the exterior of the home features 17,000 square feet (1,600 m^{2}) of outdoor deck space, a $2 million outdoor hydraulic retractable theater screen measuring 18 feet (5.5 m) by 12 feet (3.7 m), an 85-foot (26 m) glass tile infinity pool with a swim-up bar, and a helipad with an inoperable Airwolf replica that the developer calls a "sculpture." The home offers a 270-degree view of Los Angeles from the San Gabriel Mountains to the Pacific Ocean in Malibu.

There are two wine cellars, two commercial elevators lined in alligator skin, a $2 million polished steel staircase, a $500,000 set of moving Seven Dwarfs images, a $200,000 wall of candy dispensers, Dom Pérignon-filled fire extinguishers, over 130 works of art (including photographs by Timothy White and a $1 million sculpture by Liao Yibai), and a seven-person full-time staff with separate living quarters. The residence includes an auto gallery with US$30 million in luxury vehicles, including Lamborghinis, Ferraris, Bentleys, a Rolls-Royce, a Bugatti Veyron, ten motorcycles, a one-of-a-kind Pagani Huayra worth more than $2 million, and a 1936 Mercedes-Benz 540K worth in excess of $15 million.

== See also ==
- List of largest houses in the Los Angeles metropolitan area
- List of largest houses in the United States
