= Fossil Ridge Park =

Park in Sherman Oaks, California, United States

- Interactive map of Fossil Ridge Park
- Location: Corner of Mulholland Drive and Beverly Glen Boulevard, Sherman Oaks, California
- Coordinates: 34.136°N 118.443°W

Fossil Ridge Park is a public property in Sherman Oaks, Los Angeles County, California. It is owned by the Santa Monica Mountains Conservancy, which is a California state agency.

== Location ==
It is located on the corner of Mulholland Drive and Beverly Glen Boulevard in Sherman Oaks, a neighbourhood of the city of Los Angeles.

At the northern end of the park is the Buckley School, a private school. On the east side is Mulholland Estates, a gated community. Access to the park used to be blocked by security guards at Mulholland Estates. However, since 2011, members of the public are allowed to drive or walk on Westpark Road, which is inside Mulholland Estates, to have access to the park. However, parking on Westpark Road is not allowed.

Since 2002, it has been adjacent to the Oak Forest Canyon Natural Area that is also owned by the Santa Monica Mountains Conservancy. Oak Forest Canyon was purchased to facilitate access to Fossil Ridge Park.

== History ==
The idea of the park was conceived in 1986. It was dedicated five years later, in 1991. Actor Ed Asner and local politician Zev Yaroslavsky spoke at the dedication. However, it was only completed and properly opened in late 1995.

The initial parcel of land (56 acres) was donated by Kenneth Kai Chang, the real estate developer who created Mulholland Estates, to the Santa Monica Mountains Conservancy. Moreover, Chang later agreed to fund some of the trails and a visitor center.

The overall landmass is 110 acres (45 ha). It contains many fossils of marine animals. The area is protected, and rocks with fossils on them cannot be moved.

== Fossils ==
This park contains fossiliferous diatomaceous sandstones of Middle to Late Miocene Modelo Formation. It one of the few remaining fossil fish localities that has not been either destroyed or made inaccessible due to urban development.

Shown is one of several slabs of diatomaceous sandstone with abundant fossil fish (perhaps a species of herring) collected in the 1970s from the area now underneath the Mulholland Estates security gate/access road. Many hundreds if not thousands of these 5 1/2-inch fish must have encountered an area of low oxygen content and all died at once.

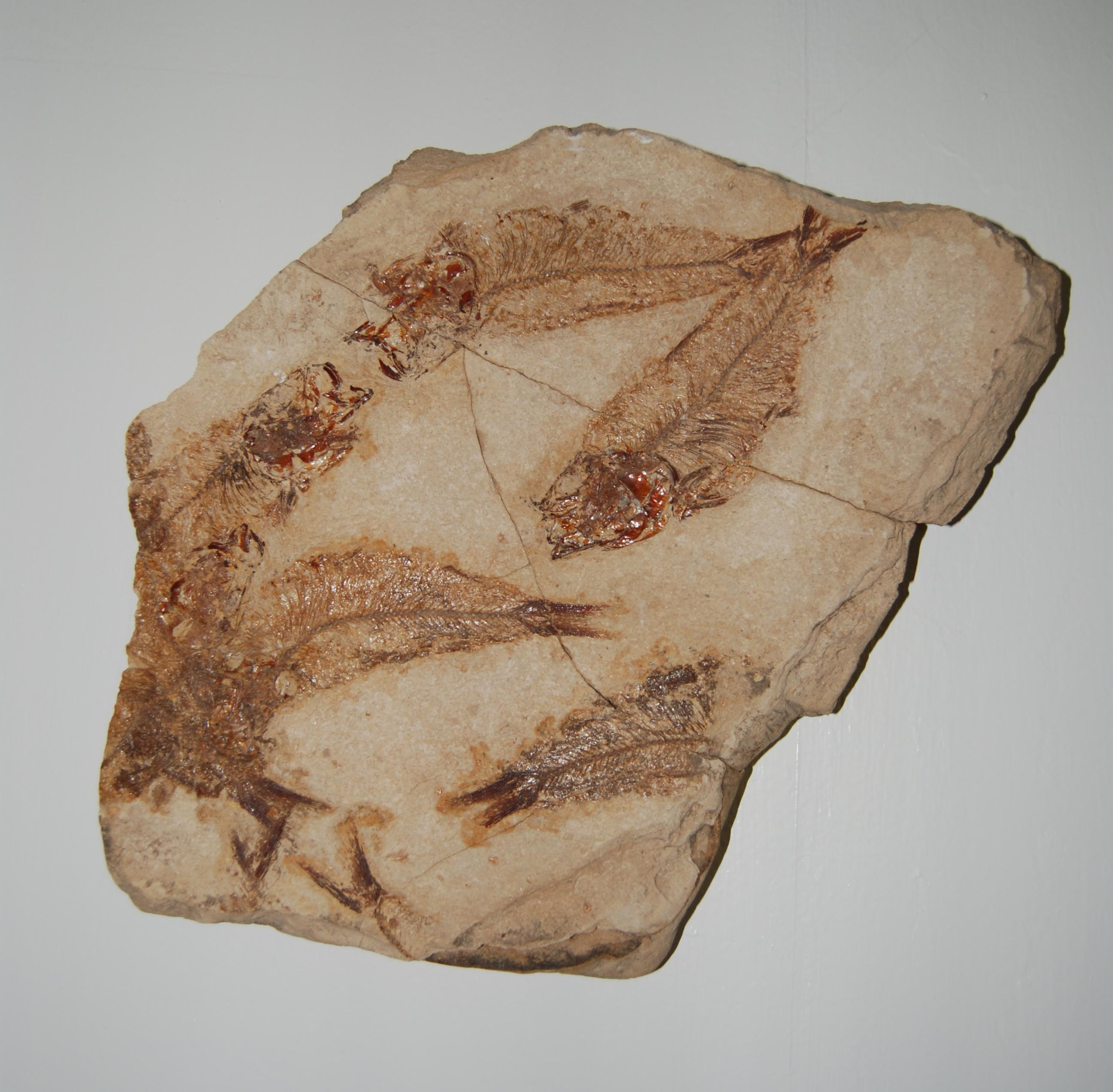
