= List of counties in Vermont =

Counties of Vermont
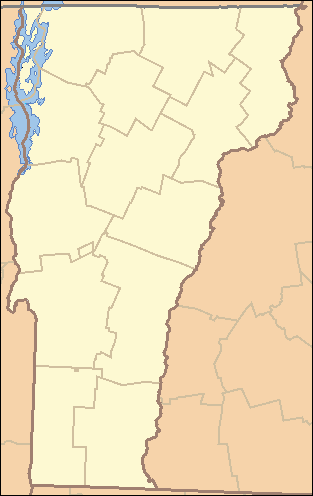
- Location: State of Vermont
- Number: 14
- Populations: 6,051 (Essex) – 169,115 (Chittenden)
- Areas: 83 square miles (210 km^{2}) (Grand Isle) – 971 square miles (2,510 km^{2}) (Windsor)
- Government: County government
- Subdivisions: Cities, towns, villages, unincorporated communities

There are fourteen counties in the U.S. state of Vermont. These counties together contain 255 political units, or places, including 237 towns, 10 cities, five unincorporated areas, and four gores. Each county has a county seat, often referred to as a "shire town".

In 1779, Vermont had two counties. The western side of the state was Bennington County and the eastern was Cumberland County. In 1781, three new counties (including then-called Washington that became part of New Hampshire) were created out of Cumberland County, and the remainder of the county was renamed Windham. Today's Washington County was created in 1810 as Jefferson County; it was renamed Washington in 1814.

Essex County, Orleans County, and Caledonia County are commonly referred to as the Northeast Kingdom.

The FIPS county code is the five-digit Federal Information Processing Standard (FIPS) code which uniquely identifies counties and county equivalents in the United States. The three-digit number is unique to each individual county within a state, but to be unique within the entire United States, it must be prefixed by the state code. This means that, for example, while Addison County, Vermont is 001, Belknap County, New Hampshire and Alachua County, Florida are also 001. To uniquely identify Addison County, Vermont, one must use the state code of 50 plus the county code of 001; therefore, the unique nationwide identifier for Addison County, Vermont is 50001. The links in the column FIPS County Code are to the Census Bureau Info page for that county.

== List ==
County	FIPS code	Shire town	Est.	Origin	Etymology	Population	Area	Map
Addison County	001	Middlebury	Oct 18, 1785	Part of Rutland County.	Joseph Addison (1672–1719), an English politician and writer.	38,048	770 sq mi (1,994 km^{2})	State map highlighting Addison County
Bennington County	003	Bennington, Manchester	Mar 17, 1778	One of the original two counties.	Benning Wentworth (1696–1770), the colonial governor of New Hampshire (1741–1766).	36,630	676 sq mi (1,751 km^{2})	State map highlighting Bennington County
Caledonia County	005	St. Johnsbury	Nov 5, 1792	Part of Orange County.	Latin name for Scotland.	30,414	651 sq mi (1,686 km^{2})	State map highlighting Caledonia County
Chittenden County	007	Burlington	Oct 22, 1787	Part of Addison County.	Thomas Chittenden (1730–1797), first governor of Vermont (1791–1797).	169,115	539 sq mi (1,396 km^{2})	State map highlighting Chittenden County
Essex County	009	Guildhall	Nov 5, 1792	Part of Orange County.	Essex, a county in England.	6,051	665 sq mi (1,722 km^{2})	State map highlighting Essex County
Franklin County	011	St. Albans (city)	Nov 5, 1792	Part of Chittenden County.	Benjamin Franklin (1706–1790), one of the most revered Founding Fathers of the United States.	51,177	637 sq mi (1,650 km^{2})	State map highlighting Franklin County
Grand Isle County	013	North Hero	Nov 9, 1802	Part of Chittenden County and Franklin County.	Largest island in Lake Champlain.	7,511	83 sq mi (215 km^{2})	State map highlighting Grand Isle County
Lamoille County	015	Hyde Park (town)	Oct 26, 1835	Parts of Chittenden County, Franklin County, Orleans County and Washington County.	La Mouette (meaning the seagull), named by French explorer Samuel de Champlain (~1570–1635) but mistranscibed as La Mouelle and eventually corrupted to current spelling.	26,294	461 sq mi (1,194 km^{2})	State map highlighting Lamoille County
Orange County	017	Chelsea	Feb 16, 1781	Part of Cumberland County.	Prince William (1650–1702) of Orange.	30,002	689 sq mi (1,785 km^{2})	State map highlighting Orange County
Orleans County	019	Newport (city)	Nov 5, 1792	Part of Chittenden County and Orange County.	City of Orléans, France.	27,600	697 sq mi (1,805 km^{2})	State map highlighting Orleans County
Rutland County	021	Rutland (city)	Feb 16, 1781	Part of Bennington County.	Town of Rutland, Massachusetts.	59,653	932 sq mi (2,414 km^{2})	State map highlighting Rutland County
Washington County	023	Montpelier	Nov 1, 1810	Parts of Orange County, Caledonia County, and Chittenden County. Renamed from Jefferson County to Washington County on November 8, 1814	George Washington (1732–1799), first President of the United States (1789–1797).	59,652	690 sq mi (1,787 km^{2})	State map highlighting Washington County
Windham County	025	Newfane	Feb 16, 1781^{[a]}	One of the original two counties.	Town of Windham, Connecticut.	45,204	789 sq mi (2,044 km^{2})	State map highlighting Windham County
Windsor County	027	Woodstock	Feb 16, 1781	Part of Cumberland County.	Town of Windsor, Connecticut.	57,312	971 sq mi (2,515 km^{2})	State map highlighting Windsor County

== Racial / Ethnic Profile of counties in Vermont (2020 Census) ==
Racial / Ethnic Profile of counties in Vermont (2020 Census)
Following is a table of counties in Vermont by race/ethnicity. The majority racial/ethnic group is coded per the key below.

Majority minority with no dominant group
Majority White
Majority Black
Majority Hispanic
Majority Asian
Majority Native American

Racial and ethnic composition of counties in Vermont (2020 Census) (NH = Non-Hispanic) Note: the US Census treats Hispanic/Latino as an ethnic category. This table excludes Latinos from the racial categories and assigns them to a separate category. Hispanics/Latinos may be of any race.
County	Location of County	Total Population	White alone (NH)	%	Black or African American alone (NH)	%	Native American or Alaska Native alone (NH)	%	Asian alone (NH)	%	Pacific Islander alone (NH)	%	Other race alone (NH)	%	Mixed race or Multiracial (NH)	%	Hispanic or Latino (any race)	%
Addison		37,363	33,440	89.50%	342	0.92%	80	0.21%	594	1.59%	10	0.03%	110	0.29%	1,634	4.37%	1,153	3.09%
Bennington		37,347	33,897	90.76%	405	1.08%	63	0.17%	397	1.06%	5	0.01%	119	0.32%	1,522	4.08%	939	2.51%
Caledonia		30,233	27,465	90.84%	214	0.71%	94	0.31%	363	1.20%	17	0.06%	119	0.39%	1,356	4.49%	605	2.00%
Chittenden		168,323	142,880	84.88%	4,757	2.83%	291	0.17%	7,203	4.28%	49	0.03%	762	0.45%	7,630	4.53%	4,751	2.82%
Essex		5,920	5,544	93.65%	15	0.25%	14	0.24%	16	0.27%	5	0.08%	5	0.08%	254	4.29%	67	1.13%
Franklin		49,946	45,239	90.58%	321	0.64%	483	0.97%	312	0.62%	16	0.03%	120	0.24%	2,540	5.09%	915	1.83%
Grand Isle		7,293	6,697	91.83%	49	0.67%	39	0.53%	30	0.41%	0	0.00%	16	0.22%	335	4.59%	127	1.74%
Lamoille		25,945	23,585	90.90%	217	0.84%	88	0.34%	141	0.54%	1	0.00%	121	0.47%	1,141	4.40%	651	2.51%
Orange		29,277	26,852	91.72%	151	0.52%	113	0.39%	160	0.55%	5	0.02%	119	0.41%	1,400	4.78%	477	1.63%
Orleans		27,393	25,259	92.21%	127	0.46%	197	0.72%	119	0.43%	1	0.00%	59	0.22%	1,169	4.27%	462	1.69%
Rutland		60,572	55,092	90.95%	493	0.81%	146	0.24%	458	0.76%	14	0.02%	171	0.28%	2,973	4.91%	1,225	2.02%
Washington		59,807	53,704	89.80%	612	1.02%	135	0.23%	632	1.06%	23	0.04%	319	0.53%	2,813	4.70%	1,569	2.62%
Windham		45,905	41,010	89.34%	495	1.08%	99	0.22%	493	1.07%	8	0.02%	243	0.53%	2,224	4.84%	1,333	2.90%
Windsor		57,753	52,537	90.97%	451	0.78%	144	0.25%	539	0.93%	16	0.03%	278	0.48%	2,558	4.43%	1,230	2.13%

== See also ==
- Gores
- List of former United States counties
- List of municipalities in Vermont

== Notes ==
- ^{a} There are several sources that state the formation year for Windham County is 1781 and that Cumberland County was dissolved rather than renamed.
