= 301 North Carolwood Drive =

- Interactive map of the 301 North Carolwood Drive area

General information
- Type: House
- Location: 301 North Carolwood Drive; Holmby Hills, California, 90077
- Coordinates: 34.084048°N 118.428487°W
- Completed: 2016
- Governing body: Private

Technical details
- Floor area: 30,000 square feet (2,800 m^{2})

301 North Carolwood Drive is a private residence located at 301 North Carolwood Drive in the city of Los Angeles, ranking as the twelfth largest private residence in the Los Angeles metropolitan area. The mansion was completed in 2016 on one of the most expensive streets in the world.

== History ==
The Mon Rêve estate originally stood at 301 North Carolwood Drive, once owned by celebrity Barbra Streisand. When Streisand owned the property it featured a 9,500 square foot home with five bedrooms and seven baths. The walled and gated Mediterranean-style home featured a pool, two-story living room, sunrooms, library and screening room. Streisand had decorated the interior with her Art Nouveau collection.

The home was sold to music executive Les Bider in 2000 and demolished shortly thereafter. The vacant lot was listed at US $13,995,000 by Linda May Properties, purchased in 2014 by David Bohnett for US $13.25 million. Bohnett used the land as his own personal park before selling it to Dream Projects LA and developer Gala Asher.

The current home was completed in 2016 and listed at US $150 million on April 12, 2016, the second most expensive residence for sale in the United States at the time. It was purchased in 2016 by billionaire Tom Gores, owner of the Detroit Pistons, in a US $100 million transaction in which several properties changed hands.

== Description ==
The main house contains 30,000 square feet (2,800 m^{2}) including 10 bedrooms and 20 bathrooms. The master bedroom occupies 5,300 square feet (490 m^{2}) and opens to a heated covered patio. Paying homage to the history of the property, Club Mon Rêve is an entertainment facility within the house that includes a wine room, a lounge, and a movie theater complex with a separate valet entrance for guests.

Other amenities include a water wall that empties into an indoor lap pool and hot tub, and a spa complete with a hair salon, a manicure/pedicure area, and steam and massage rooms. The 2.17-acre (0.88 ha) property includes two outdoor infinity pools, a hiking trail marked by lighted trees, basketball and tennis courts, several guest houses, parking for more than 50 vehicles, and a 10-car garage, a total of 38,000 square feet (3,500 m^{2}) of indoor space.

== See also ==
- List of largest houses in the Los Angeles Metropolitan Area
- List of largest houses in the United States
