= Sam Gores =

American talent agent

- Born: Samir Georgious; 1954 (age 71–72); Nazareth, Israel
- Education: American Academy of Dramatic Arts (BA)
- Occupation: Talent agent
- Known for: Chairman of Paradigm Talent Agency
- Spouse: Jensen Buchanan (m. 2003; div. 2013)
- Children: 3
- Family: Tom Gores (brother); Alec Gores (brother); Eric Gores (nephew)

Signature
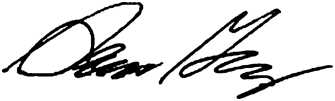

Sam Gores (born Samir Georgious, Arabic: سمير جورجيوس; Greek: Σαμίρ Γεωργίου; Hebrew: סמיר ג'ורג'יוס; 1954) is the chairman of Paradigm Talent Agency in Beverly Hills, California and has been ranked among the top agents in Hollywood.

== Early life and education ==
Gores was born in Nazareth, Israel, in 1954 to a Christian family with a father of Greek (Greek Orthodox Christian) descent and a mother of Lebanese (Maronite Catholic) descent alongside his two brothers and three sisters. His older brother, Alec, and his younger brother, Tom, both founders of private equity firms, have been included on the Forbes list as among the wealthiest people in the world. In 1968, when Gores was 14, his parents sold their home and possessions to purchase plane tickets to immigrate to the United States. They settled near Flint, Michigan. Sam immediately went to work bagging groceries in an uncle's supermarket, and worked his way through high school as a butcher. After graduating from Genesee High School, he began studying at the American Academy of Dramatic Arts in New York, and later graduated with the academy's first class in Pasadena in 1976. Gores now serves on The American Academy of Dramatic Arts Board of Trustees.

== Career ==
After school, he worked without salary as an agent at The Gage Group, Inc., founded by Martin Gage, for almost two years while selling shoes on the side to support himself. Eventually, Gage brought Gores on staff. After several years at The Gage Group, Gores left to open his own agency, SGA Representation, and began to expand his business over time by acquiring other agencies. In 1986, SGA acquired The Jack Fields Agency and changed its name to Gores/Fields.

Gores represented Academy Award-winning actor Philip Seymour Hoffman, and was described as “the most un-agent agent in the business because he’s a human being first,” by another one of his clients, Laurence Fishburne. Gores expanding his agency through acquisitions and mergers. By 1993, he had forged pacts with other agencies to form Paradigm, which now has clients that include Academy Award-winning actor Adrien Brody, Emmy Award winner Julie Bowen, Emmy and Tony Award winner Fishburne and Antonio Banderas.

Paradigm moved into the former headquarters of MCA Inc. on Crescent Drive in Beverly Hills and expanded its list of customers to include a broad base of Hollywood, Broadway, literary, television and musical talent.

In 2005, Paradigm's entered the music industry when it acquired Monterey Peninsula Artists and its roster of clients expanded to include The Black Eyed Peas, Aerosmith, Dave Matthews Band and Toby Keith. It later acquired New York-based Little Big Man, adding Coldplay and The Fray. In 2010, with his brothers, he made an all-cash $550 million bid to buy Miramax, but lost the deal against The Weinstein Company. As of 2014, Paradigm represents roughly 1,000 bands and artists, including Ed Sheeran, Fun., Janelle Monáe and Jason Mraz; and has grown to eight offices – Beverly Hills, Manhattan, Monterey, Nashville, Brooklyn, Austin, Hollywood, and London – and more than 300 employees. In 2020, his brother Tom became a shareholder of Paradigm through his investment vehicle Crescent Drive Media. The following year, he sold Paradigm's live music representation business to Wasserman.

=== Controversy ===
Amid the coronavirus outbreak, Gores laid off a large portion of Paradigm's staff, drawing criticism from media and employees. Gores was accused of being misleading after firing more than double the amount of employees originally reported and cutting insurance for laid off employees, which Gores later extended until June 2020. One employee filed a lawsuit, alleging serious misconduct from Gores including payoffs, prostitution and criminal misconduct. Gores’ former executive assistant, referenced in the lawsuit, called the misconduct claims “blatant lies.” In April 2020, Gores filed a counter lawsuit, denying all allegations of impropriety and characterized the accusations as “self-aggrandizing and delusional.” The case is headed to arbitration.

== Public advocacy ==
Gores is a member of the Academy of Motion Picture Arts and Sciences, the Academy of Television Arts and Sciences and the Recording Academy. Gores serves on the Board of Directors for the Geffen Playhouse, is an active participant in Conservation International, and is involved in Hand in Hand: Center for Jewish Arab Education in Israel.

== Personal life ==
Gores is father to three children and grandfather to five grandchildren.
