= The Kid & I =

- Theatrical release poster
- Directed by: Penelope Spheeris
- Written by: Tom Arnold
- Produced by: Tom Arnold; Brad Wyman; Penelope Spheeris
- Starring: Tom Arnold; Eric Gores; Linda Hamilton; Henry Winkler; Richard Edson; Brenda Strong; Arielle Kebbel; Shannon Elizabeth; Joe Mantegna
- Cinematography: Robert Seaman
- Edited by: Jan Northrop; John Wesley Whitton
- Music by: Damon Fox
- Distributed by: Slow Hand Releasing; PorchLight Entertainment
- Release date: December 2, 2005
- Running time: 93 minutes
- Language: English
- Budget: $5 million

The Kid & I is a 2005 American comedy film directed by Penelope Spheeris and starring Tom Arnold and Eric Gores.

== Plot ==
Former actor Bill Williams (Tom Arnold) is about to commit suicide over his ruined career. He throws out all his stuff and gives his clothes to a homeless man. The man drinks Bill's vodka and takes half of his pills messing up his suicide plan and takes off. Bill drinks his alcohol and then takes the remaining pills. He then lies down in the bathtub. Three days later an eccentric film agent named Johnny Bernstein (Henry Winkler) shows up at the apartment with a business offer for him. He says a billionaire, Davis Roman (Joe Mantegna), will hire Bill to write and co-star in a movie exactly like 1994's True Lies so that his son, Aaron Roman (Eric Gores), whose favorite film is True Lies, can live out his dream of being an actor and star of an action movie. Not knowing much about the boy or the billionaire, Bill agrees to do the project since he would make considerable profits.

Later at the park, Bill encounters the man previously in his apartment. His name is Guy Prince (Richard Edson), and he hasn't had a job in over 10 years. Bill finds he has a lot in common with Guy and asks him if he's interested in acting. Guy agrees and he becomes Bill's unconventional "best friend".

Johnny, Bill, and Guy later show up at the lavish Roman mansion, meeting with Davis and his wife, Shelby (Shannon Elizabeth). As they are a nice couple, Bill thinks they have a nice, normal son. However, when Aaron shows up, Bill becomes uncomfortable and assumes he will be making a bad film with a mentally impaired person. He attempts to back out of the offer when his ex-wife, producer Susan Mandeville (Linda Hamilton), comes in with a film crew and tells everybody she will be producing the movie. Shortly after she shows up, Davis tells Bill about how smart and dedicated Aaron is despite having cerebral palsy. Bill, remembering the money he will receive, agrees again to make the movie. Aaron, very excited to see Bill in person, tells him about his interesting movie ideas as they begin to write the script. Although some of Aaron's ideas are unrealistic, Bill becomes confident they will be able to shoot the movie, which Aaron decides to call Two Spies. Guy is enjoying himself as well as he flirts with the local women and spends time drinking all the Roman's booze. When Aaron tells Bill he wants to kiss a beautiful woman while in a hot tub for the closing scene, Bill agrees.

== Cast ==
Actor	Role
Tom Arnold	Bill Williams
Eric Gores	Aaron (A-Dog) Roman
Linda Hamilton	Susan Mandeville
Joe Mantegna	Davis Roman
Henry Winkler	Johnny Bernstein
Richard Edson	Guy Prince
Shannon Elizabeth	Shelby Roman
Brenda Strong	Bonnie Roman
Arielle Kebbel	Arielle
Yvette Nicole Brown	Bunny
Gabby Sanalitro	Val
Laura Michel Kahwaji	Laura
Shaquille O'Neal	Shaq
Bill Goldberg	Goldberg
Alejandro Patiño	Apartment Manager
Brianne Davis	Marla
Dominique Grund	Chloe
Jamie Lee Curtis	Herself
Arnold Schwarzenegger	Himself

== Production ==
Gores is the son of Alec Gores, a billionaire technology investor and founder of the Gores Technology Group, best known for its acquisition and resale of Broderbund. The younger Gores has cerebral palsy and his father hired Arnold, a neighbor in Los Angeles, to make a sequel to Eric's favorite film, True Lies (1994), in which Arnold co-starred. The plot of The Kid & I closely parallels the actual situation.

The profits for this movie are going to United Cerebral Palsy, a lobby group for disabled people in Washington, D.C.

Jamie Lee Curtis makes a cameo appearance in this movie as herself, as does Arnold Schwarzenegger, in his second film appearance since becoming Governor of California.

== Reception ==
On the review aggregator website Rotten Tomatoes, 35% of 26 critics' reviews are positive. The website's consensus reads: "Well-intentioned but sappy, The Kid & I is a strange hybrid of comedy and cinema verite." Metacritic, which uses a weighted average, assigned the film a score of 37 out of 100, based on 13 critics, indicating "generally unfavorable" reviews.

== Songs ==
- "What's Up Doc (Can We Rock)" by The Fu-Schnickens
- "The Final Countdown" by Europe
- "Love Me With All Your Heart" by Agnetha Fältskog
- "A Whiter Shade of Pale" by Procol Harum
- "Achy Breaky Heart" by Billy Ray Cyrus
- "Funky Cold Medina" by Tone Loc
- "Let Me See Your Underwear" by THEM

== See also ==
- List of American films of 2005
- Arnold Schwarzenegger filmography
