= Beverly Glen, Los Angeles =

Beverly Glen
- Neighborhood of Los Angeles
- Location within Western Los Angeles
- Coordinates: 34.10778°N 118.44472°W
- Country: United States
- State: California
- County: Los Angeles
- City: Los Angeles
- Time zone: UTC−8 (PST)
  - Summer (DST): UTC−7 (PDT)
- ZIP Codes: 90210 and 90077
- Website: beverlyglen.org

Beverly Glen is a neighborhood in the Santa Monica Mountains region of Los Angeles, California, located around Beverly Glen Boulevard north of Sunset Boulevard and south of Mulholland Drive. Stone Canyon Reservoir lies in the neighborhood.

The neighborhood of Beverly Glen is located within the ZIP Codes of 90210 and 90077. Residents living in Beverly Glen access their homes primarily by use of Beverly Glen Boulevard, which is a busy thoroughfare for drivers between the Century City/Westwood area and the San Fernando Valley.

== Geography and subdivisions ==
At the top of the Beverly Glen canyon, Glenridge (originally Beverly Glen Village) and Beverly Glen Park are planned developments with tennis courts and community pools built in the 1970s and 1980s.

== Demographics ==
The following data applies to Beverly Glen within the boundaries set by the Los Angeles Almanac:

The 2010 U.S. census counted 4,341 people in Beverly Glen, of whom 83.21% were white, 0.90% black, 0.12% American Indian or Alaska Native, 6.70% Asian, 0.02% Native Hawaiian or other Pacific Islander, 1.24% other, 4.81% of two or more races, and 4.79% Hispanic or Latino.

The most prevalent ancestries are Russian (12.4%) and Iranian (10.2%). The most common countries of birth for foreign-born residents are Iran (28.6%) and the United Kingdom (8.6%).

== Education ==
Beverly Glen is zoned to Los Angeles Unified School District schools. The neighborhood is jointly zoned to Warner Avenue Elementary School and Roscomare Road Elementary School.

In addition, the neighborhood is zoned to Emerson Middle School and University High School.

=== Police service ===
Los Angeles Police Department operates the West Los Angeles Community Police Station at 1663 Butler Avenue, 90025, serving the neighborhood.

== Parks and recreation ==
Beverly Glen contains three sites operated by the City of Los Angeles Department of Recreation and Parks:

- Briarwood Park is an unstaffed park, open from dawn to dusk, and contains basketball courts and a children's play area.
- De Neve Square Park is a small unstaffed park, open from dawn to dusk, and contains benches.
- Beverly Glen Park is classified as a regional open space, as defined by the LA County Parks Department. This space surrounds private residential property and a private dog park, Bel Air Ridge. Bel Air Ridge is often confused for Beverly Glen Park.

The community puts on a street fair each June and an annual garden walk and brunch. In 2001, the Beverly Glen farmers market was founded.

== Notable resident ==
- Harlan Ellison, American writer who lived in Beverly Glen for over 50 years.
