= Bruce Makowsky =

American real estate developer and entrepreneur

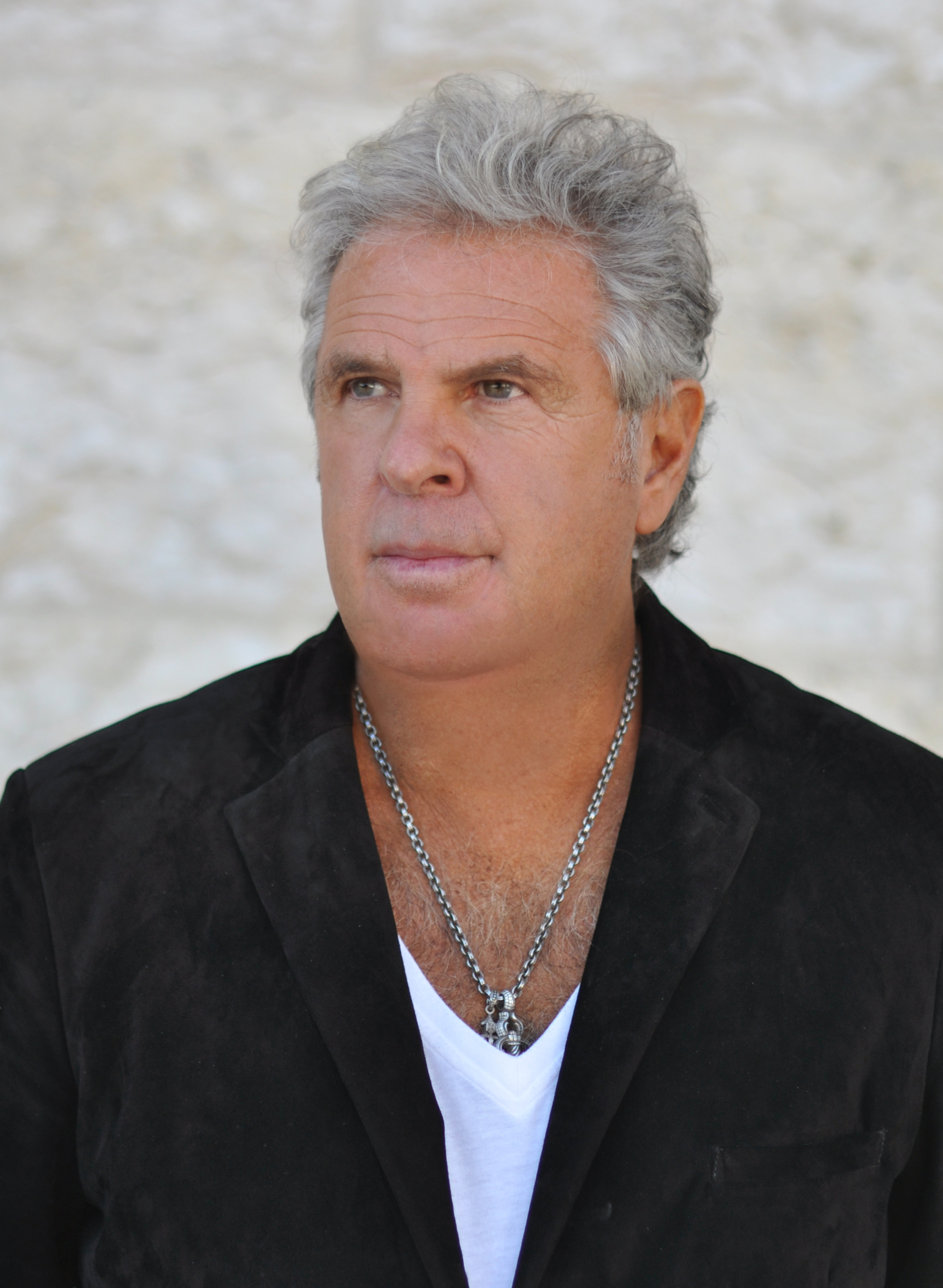
- Born: 1956 (age 69–70)
- Occupation: Real-estate developer
- Spouse: Kathy Van Zeeland

Bruce Makowsky (born 1956) is an American real estate developer and entrepreneur. In 2017, he set the record for the most expensive home listed in the United States by listing a home he developed in Bel Air on the market for $250 million, which ultimately sold for $94 million in October 2019.

== Career ==
Makowsky built a fashion business in New York selling designer handbags through over 1,300 department stores and QVC. He and his wife, Kathy Van Zeeland, sold handbags and shoes for 30 years through their flagship labels Kathy Van Zeeland Handbags, B. Makowsky and Tignanello. The couple sold the company in 2008 to Li & Fung Ltd based in Hong Kong.

Makowsky is the founder of BAM Luxury Development, a property development company that focuses on a 10-mile radius centered around the Westside of Los Angeles. After buying an oceanfront home in Malibu, California in 2010, Makowsky purchased a 12,500-square-foot European villa-style home as an investment property in Beverly Park, Los Angeles.

In early 2013, he purchased a house above the Sunset Strip for $5.3 million, which he renovated and sold for $19 million in April 2014. That August, Makowsky purchased a home in the Trousdale Estates of Beverly Hills for $12.65 million, and after renovations listed it for $65 million.

Makowsky listed an 8-bedroom, 15-bathroom mansion in Beverly Hills for $85 million in September 2014. Also in 2014, he sold a 22,300 square-foot Beverly Hills mansion to the creator of Minecraft, Markus Persson, for $70 million. The sale broke a price record in its Beverly Hills neighborhood. The mansion has an infinity pool, a candy wall, and a "car turntable".

In January 2017, Makowsky listed a Bel Air mansion $250 million known as Billionaire, the most expensive home listed on the American market at the time. It was relisted in April 2018 for $188 million. Previously, the highest recorded sale price in the area was $100 million for two homes sold in 2016 including the Playboy Mansion, and a home in Holmby Hills, Los Angeles which was listed for $150 million.

The most expensive listing, previous to Makowsky's mansion, was a $195 million mansion in Manalapan, Florida. Developed by Makowsky's BAM Luxury Development team, Makowsky said his inspiration came from megayachts. He wanted his creation to be "the ultimate megayacht, but on land." The 38,000 square-foot house has four floors, 12 bedrooms, 21 bathrooms, and three kitchens. It also features a 40-seat James Bond themed movie theater an infinity pool with swim-up bar and two stocked wine cellars.

Inside the house, Makowsky has added 130 artworks including a helicopter on the roof which appeared in the 1980s television series Airwolf, and a Hobie Cat sailboat on a deck. The home includes a 12 car "auto gallery," including a limited edition Bugatti Veyron, a Pagani Huayra, a 1936 Mercedes-Benz 540K, and a Rolls-Royce Dawn. The home took over four years to build and furnish. The mansion was built on a 1.2-acre lot which Makowsky bought from New York Giants football player Michael Strahan in 2013.

== Net worth ==
Makowsky has an estimated net worth of US$100 million.
