= Stone Canyon Reservoir =

Reservoir in Los Angeles, California, United States

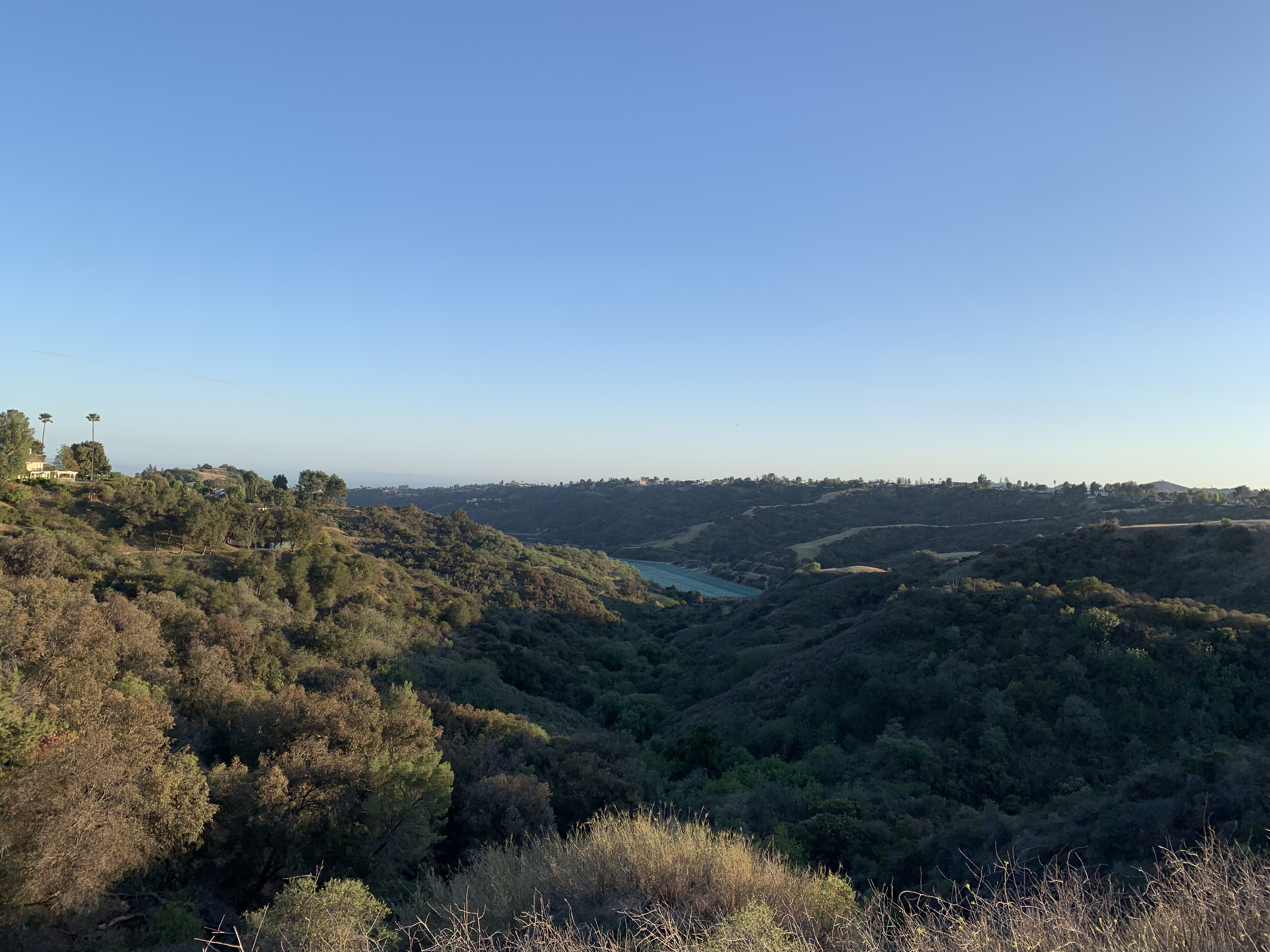
- The Reservoir as seen from the Stone Canyon Overlook off of Mulholland Drive.

- Location within the Los Angeles metropolitan area Location within California Location within the United States
- Coordinates: 34°6′40″N 118°27′16″W
- Built: 1952
- Surface elevation: 843 feet (257 m)
- Settlements: Bel Air, Los Angeles, California, USA

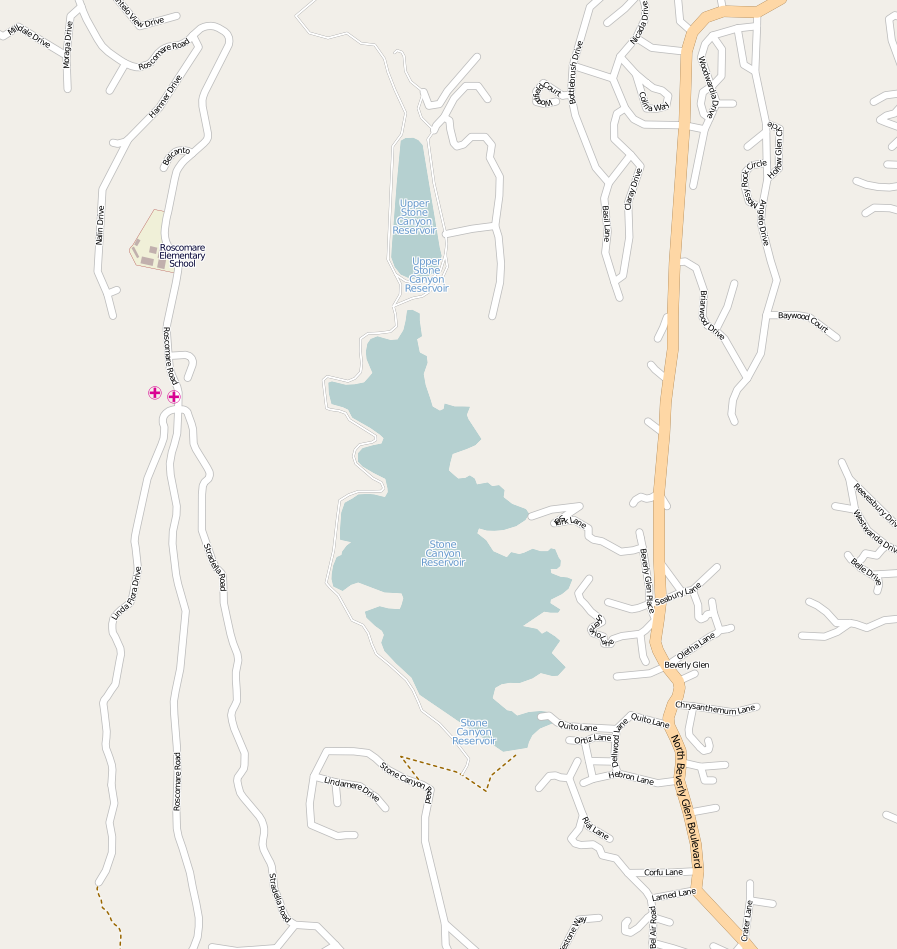

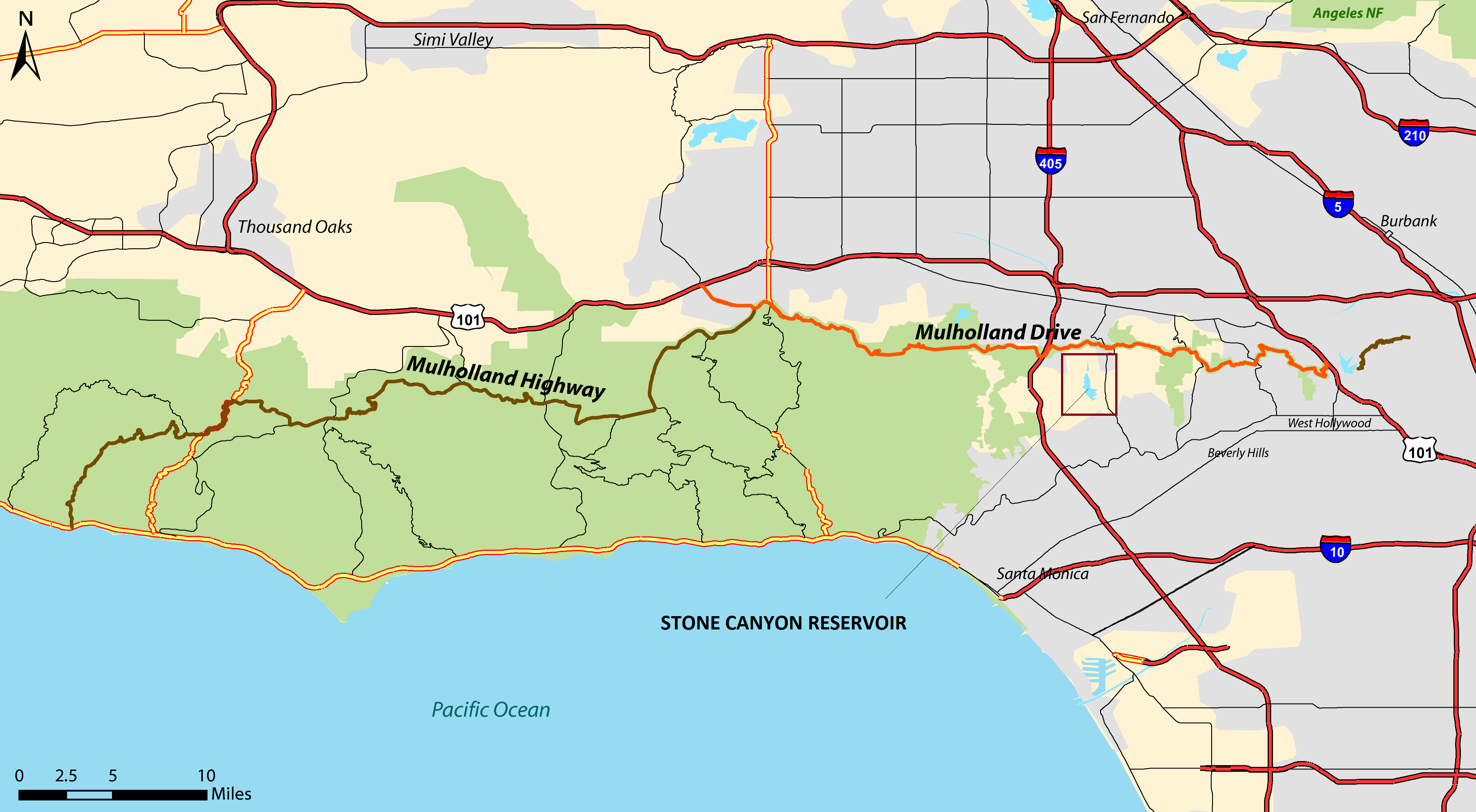
Location

Stone Canyon Reservoir and Upper Stone Canyon Reservoir are adjoining reservoirs in the Westside region of Los Angeles, California. Situated in the Santa Monica Mountains at 847 feet (258 m) above sea level, the reservoirs lie in the Bel Air neighborhood, south of Mulholland Drive and west of North Beverly Glen Boulevard. The main reservoir is the Stone Canyon Reservoir with the much smaller, cone-shaped Upper Stone Canyon Reservoir adjoining it to the north. The two reservoirs supply the Westside water subsystem, including service to around 400,000 people in Pacific Palisades, the Santa Monica Mountains, and West Los Angeles.

== History ==
The reservoirs are owned by the Los Angeles Department of Water and Power. The main reservoir, which is the lower reservoir and the larger of the two, is situated south of the upper reservoir. It was designed and built in 1924 by the Los Angeles Department of Water and Power's water branch, the Bureau of Water Works and Supply (BWWS). As with most other BWWS reservoirs of the time, it is of earth fill construction which was placed utilizing the hydraulic sluicing method. This method was pioneered and refined by William Mulholland. This reservoir had an original capacity of 8,000 acre⋅ft (9,900,000 m^{3}).

In the mid-1950s, the upstream part of the dam was rebuilt as a roller compacted backfill founded on rock, while the downstream part remained unchanged. The rehabilitation work was completed in 1956. The 160 feet (49 m) high dam was examined from the safety considerations to withstand seismic factors. Seismic studies were carried out in 2002 and the conclusion was that the Lower Stone Canyon Dam could be "operated safely with the reservoir level at its design elevation of 865 feet (264 m)."

== Project features ==
Stone Canyon Reservoir is composed of two reservoirs, namely, the larger Lower at 34°6′24″N 118°27′09″W and the Upper at 34°07′06″N 118°27′21″W. The elevation of the Lower is 243 feet (74 m) at full reservoir level and 247 feet (75 m) at maximum water level. When built, both reservoirs stored treated drinking water. This enabled surface runoff to flow into the reservoir. resulting in contamination.

The Lower Reservoir is in an irregular shape with a shore line of 5,500 feet (1,700 m) and surface area of 117 acres (47 ha). The 70 ton water treatment plant commissioned in January 1952 is located downstream. The intake was designed as an inclined tower to maximize the natural site conditions which enabled the design of the tower to be based on the unit weight factor.

It was established in 1952 for a total of around $9 million. Construction was partly funded by the California Department of Transportation Environmental Enhancement and Mitigation Grant Program. Taking advantage of the natural terrain, an inclined tower was built that eliminated the need for an access bridge and reduced the unit bearing load. A somewhat unusual change in radon level began at the canyon in 1984, possibly a result of a reservoir level change.

At least part of the lower reservoir expansion included asphalt linings. Some of the landslides at the upper reservoir were caused by undercut grading. To compact the area brush and reduce the height of the flammable materials, heavy drums were filled with water and then rolled up and down the slopes. Proposed 2004 system changes included removing the reservoir from normal operating service, and retaining it for emergency storage only.

However, as the reservoirs were of open surface type, in later years, they did not conform to the prescribed water quality standards for potable water. The Federal and State Surface Water Treatment Rules prescribed that covering of all smaller reservoirs and building of filtration plants at all large ones was essential. The authorities connected with the Lower Stone Reservoir were directed by the department to build a filtration plant facility below the dam, in a 13 acres (5.3 ha) area within 100 feet (30 m) of Stone Canyon Road residences.

In the studies conducted in 1991 on the quality of the water stored in the two surface reservoirs it was concluded that the water stored had high turbidity values (about 1 NTU which was more than the standard acceptable value of 0.5 NTU) as it received surface water inflows from the catchment of the reservoir. It was also noted that the coliform bacteria level was also higher than the upper reservoir. High algae count was also reported during the summer season. Further, the average THM value measured was a high of 24 μg/L. These aspects of deteriorating water quality of the two surface reservoirs necessitated provision of water treatment plant (filtration plant).

However, following the Federal and State Government directives, a 20,000 square feet (1,900 m^{2}) membrane filtration and pumping facility was built at an estimated cost of $65 to 70 million to supply 6.5 million US gallons (25,000 m^{3}) of water per day to serve 400,000 customers. A security fence was also built around the facility.

== Decommissioning of Lower Stone Canyon Reservoir ==
Planning for further improvement in treatment and supply facility was undertaken in 2004 to ensure removal of potential contaminants from the Lower Stone Canyon Reservoir water. These improvements were proposed to conform to the safe drinking water standards through a microfiltration plant that would treat the surface water through membrane filtration along with chemical disinfection before it entered the distribution system. The new plant also provided for fully automated remote operation. This plant was located in a valley on the left abutment of Lower Stone Canyon Dam near the existing reservoir outlet. All visible elements were Architectural aesthetics ensured adoption of existing trees with its precincts and acoustics of operation ensuring an ambient noise level of not more than 30 decibels. The project titled “The Stone Canyon Water Quality Improvement Project” was undertaken by the Los Angeles Department of Water and Power with an allocation of $75 million. The project construction was started in 2004 and completed by the end of 2007. Along with this project, the Los Angeles Department of Water and Power also undertook an upgrade of the security and safety of the entire city's water system at a cost of $132 million spent over a five-year period. This security initiative was an outcome of the terrorist attacks of 9/11.

After the upgrade of the water treatment and supply facility, the Lower Stone Reservoir is not in use except in emergency situations. The unique feature of this project is that a 63-inch diameter bypass HDPE pipeline is laid over a length of 8,000 feet (2,400 m). Half of this length is submerged below the surface of the lower reservoir, bypassing it from where the treated water is directly supplied to the customers from the Los Angeles Aqueduct Filtration Plant in Sylmar.

The lower reservoir has a capacity of 3.38 billion US gallons (12,800,000 m^{3}) of water while the upper reservoir has capacity to store 138 million US gallons (520,000 m^{3}) of water. However, the upper reservoir has been built with sufficient safeguards against surface runoff by way of boundary channels which is not the case in the lower reservoir. Moreover, the Lower Stone Canyon reservoir no longer supplies customers directly.

The reservoirs are subject to flash floods, when they are put out of service during the period of the flood. In case of 100 year storm rainfall, the Upper Stone Canyon Reservoir spills to the lower reservoir where it is taken through the filtration process before supplying to the customers.

== Decommissioning of the Upper Stone Canyon Reservoir ==
A proposal to replace the existing Upper Stone Canyon Reservoir is under active consideration. The proposal is to replace the surface reservoir with three underground reservoirs beneath it to store 81 million US gallons (310,000 m^{3}) of water. The underground structures are proposed to be covered initially with soil and then covered over with local vegetation. Hiking trails are also proposed to pass through the filled up area as a recreational activity to trek the canyon. The objective of this project is basically to follow the regulations set under the Federal Laws for uncovered reservoirs. The lower reservoir has already been decommissioned for regular use but with provision to address emergency situations with a small water treatment plant built to handle such a situation. In case of fire emergency it is planned that the lower reservoir which has enough storage could provide firefighting requirements. The security aspect is also suitable addressed with the project of transferring water under the Stone Canyon Water Quality Improvement Project. Last reported in 2009, the Environment Impact assessment study of this project was under way with the Board of Water and Power Commissioners entailed to take a decision regarding the proposed project.

== In fiction ==
The reservoir has been used as a setting in movies and novels. In 1974, the reservoir was used as a location for the movie Chinatown. Page one of the first galley proofs of Irving Wallace's 1974 novel The Fan Club is set overlooking Stone Canyon Reservoir. Page two of Sunset Express, a 1996 detective novel by Robert Crais, is set by the reservoir.

== Overlook ==
The 55-mile-long Mulholland Scenic Parkway and Corridor is one of the most famous thoroughfares in the United States and includes the 24 miles (39 km) of Mulholland Drive, which passes through the City of Los Angeles. This drive was constructed in 1924 with the objective of providing a scenic panorama of the mountains, beaches and reservoirs along its winding route. In 1994, the Stone Canyon Reservoir Overlook was developed on the south side of Mulholland Drive. Funds for this facility were provided by the California Department of Transportation Environmental Enhancement and Mitigation Grant Program.

== Recreation ==
Stone Canyon Reservoir is closed to the public. There is no fishing, sailing, or swimming.

== Notable residents ==
The 1959 Henry Singleton house, the 1972 Wilt Chamberlain house, and Della Reese's house overlook the reservoir.

== See also ==
- List of lakes in California
