= Paradigm Talent Agency =

American talent agency

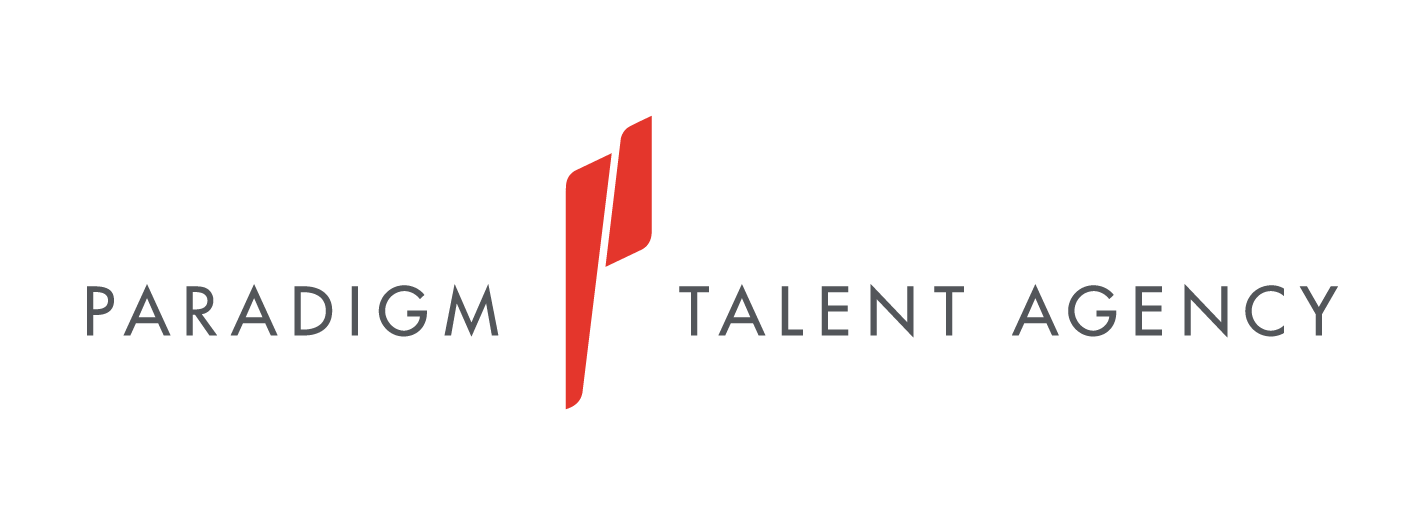
- Type: Private
- Industry: Talent and literary agencies
- Founded: Beverly Hills, California, USA (1992)
- Headquarters: Beverly Hills, California
- Key people: Sam Gores, chairman and CEO
- Website: ParadigmAgency.com

Paradigm Talent Agency is an American full-service entertainment agency with offices in Los Angeles, New York, London, Chicago, Toronto, Monterey, Nashville, Berkeley and Austin. Paradigm Talent Agency has more than 200 agents representing clients in television, music performances, motion picture, theatre, book publishing, digital, commercial/voiceover, content finance, media rights, brand partnerships and beyond. Paradigm's clients have included author Stephen King, actors Sydney Sweeney, Antonio Banderas and Brian Cox, directors James Wan and Malcolm D. Lee, and musicians Coldplay, Billie Eilish, Halsey, and Ed Sheeran, as of 2018.

Paradigm has won the Pollstar Award for Booking Agency of the Year four times, in 2016, 2018, 2019 and 2020.

== History ==
Sam Gores, chairman and CEO, opened his first agency, SGA Representation, Inc. in 1986. SGA acquired The Jack Fields Agency and changed its name to Gores/Fields. The agency expanded further the following year, bringing ATM & Associates into the fold. During the years 1992 and 1993 Gores forged pacts with STE Representations; Robinson, Weintraub, Gross & Associates, and Shorr, Stille & Associates to create Paradigm Talent Agency.

The agency's original Beverly Hills office was located on the old MCA Inc. campus built in 1932 where conference rooms honor Jules Stein and Lew Wasserman, who occupied the space. In 2018, the agency moved to the 82,000-square-foot Wilshire LaPeer building on Wilshire Blvd, where ICM was once headquartered.

In 2004, Paradigm acquired the literary firm Genesis and the Writers & Artists Agency. The acquisition added a dozen agents, and also brought a potent TV client list including 24 creator/executive producer Joel Surnow and Two and a Half Men co-creator/exec producer Lee Aronsohn to Paradigm.

Paradigm made a major strategic move in 2004 by acquiring independent music agency Monterey Peninsula Artists, and followed up on that gain in 2006 by acquiring New York based music booking agency Little Big Man. Expanding their footprint in the music industry, in 2008, Paradigm acquired Ellis Industries, a leading independent music agency based in New York, and in 2009 acquired Third Coast Artists Agency, the largest independent Christian Music agency, which was headquartered in Nashville.

Paradigm Chairman and CEO Sam Gores on what makes a good acquisition or partnership target when looking to expand: "It starts with who’s in charge, who’s at the base or foundation. I don’t think we’ll ever make a deal with people who lack integrity or are not revered by the community in general, or who have a trail of bad history behind them. If it’s a good cultural fit, or if you think you can help them grow by having them be part of a bigger infrastructure and more access in areas of branding, film and television, then how does that complement the rest of our business in that area? For instance, Little Big Man and Monterey complemented each other -- Monterey had all the legacy artists and big bands and [LBM founder] Marty [Diamond] had all the cool stuff that was up-and-coming. That really rounded out our business."

In 2012, Paradigm expanded into the burgeoning electronic dance music business by forming a joint venture partnership with AM Only, an EDM agency whose client list includes genre superstars David Guetta, Skrillex and Tiësto.

In January 2014, Paradigm acquired a 50% stake in the London-based Coda Agency. Strategically, the alliance planted a flag for Paradigm in London and, by extension, Europe and other international markets. The combination of Paradigm Talent Agency's Music Division, AM Only, and Coda Music Agency made Paradigm one of the top music agencies in the world, with clients including Coldplay, Dave Matthews Band, Ed Sheeran, Fun., Bon Iver, Janelle Monáe, Jason Mraz, The Lumineers and Phish, among others. Paradigm further expanded its European presence by partnering with London-based X-ray Touring in 2017.

In January 2017, music agencies AM Only and the Windish Agency formally became known as Paradigm Talent Agency, after partnerships since 2012 and 2015, respectively.

On 18 April 2019, Paradigm named Marty Diamond as its new head of global music. On April 26, 2022, Wasserman Music acquired Paradigm UK's Live Music Business.
