= Rocky Vista University =

American medical school

Coordinates: 39.5641°N 104.8147°W

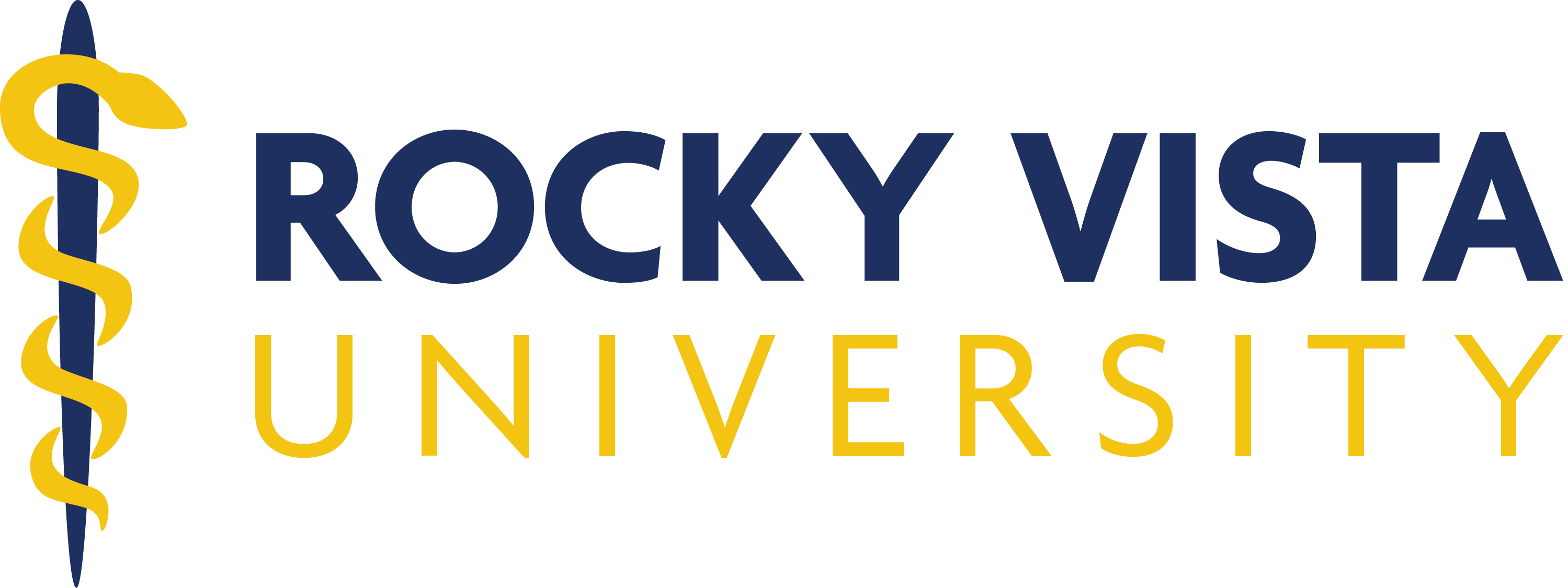
- Motto in English: Achieving New Heights in Medical Education
- Type: Private for-profit osteopathic medical school
- Established: 2006
- Founders: Yife Tien
- Parent institution: Medforth Global Healthcare Education
- Affiliations: St. George's University
- President: David Forstein
- Location: Englewood, Colorado; Ivins, Utah; and Billings, Montana, United States
- Campus: Suburban
- Website: www.rvu.edu

Rocky Vista University (RVU) is a private, for-profit medical school with campuses in Englewood, Colorado, in Ivins, Utah, and in Billings, Montana. The school opened in 2006 as the only modern for-profit medical school in the United States although other for-profit schools have since opened. RVU's College of Osteopathic Medicine (RVUCOM) grants the Doctor of Osteopathic Medicine degree and admitted its inaugural class of medical students at the Parker, Colorado campus in August 2008.

== History ==
Rocky Vista University opened in 2006, and the first class was admitted in 2008. The school graduated its inaugural class on May 19, 2012. In 2017, a second campus was opened in Ivins, Utah, admitting its first class of osteopathic medical students in the fall of 2017. In September 2018, the first class of physician assistant students began coursework.

The college is accredited by the American Osteopathic Association Commission on Osteopathic College Accreditation and the Higher Learning Commission.

In 2023, Rocky Vista University opened a new medical school, the Montana College of Osteopathic Medicine, in Billings, Montana.

== Academics ==
=== Doctor of Osteopathic Medicine (DO) ===
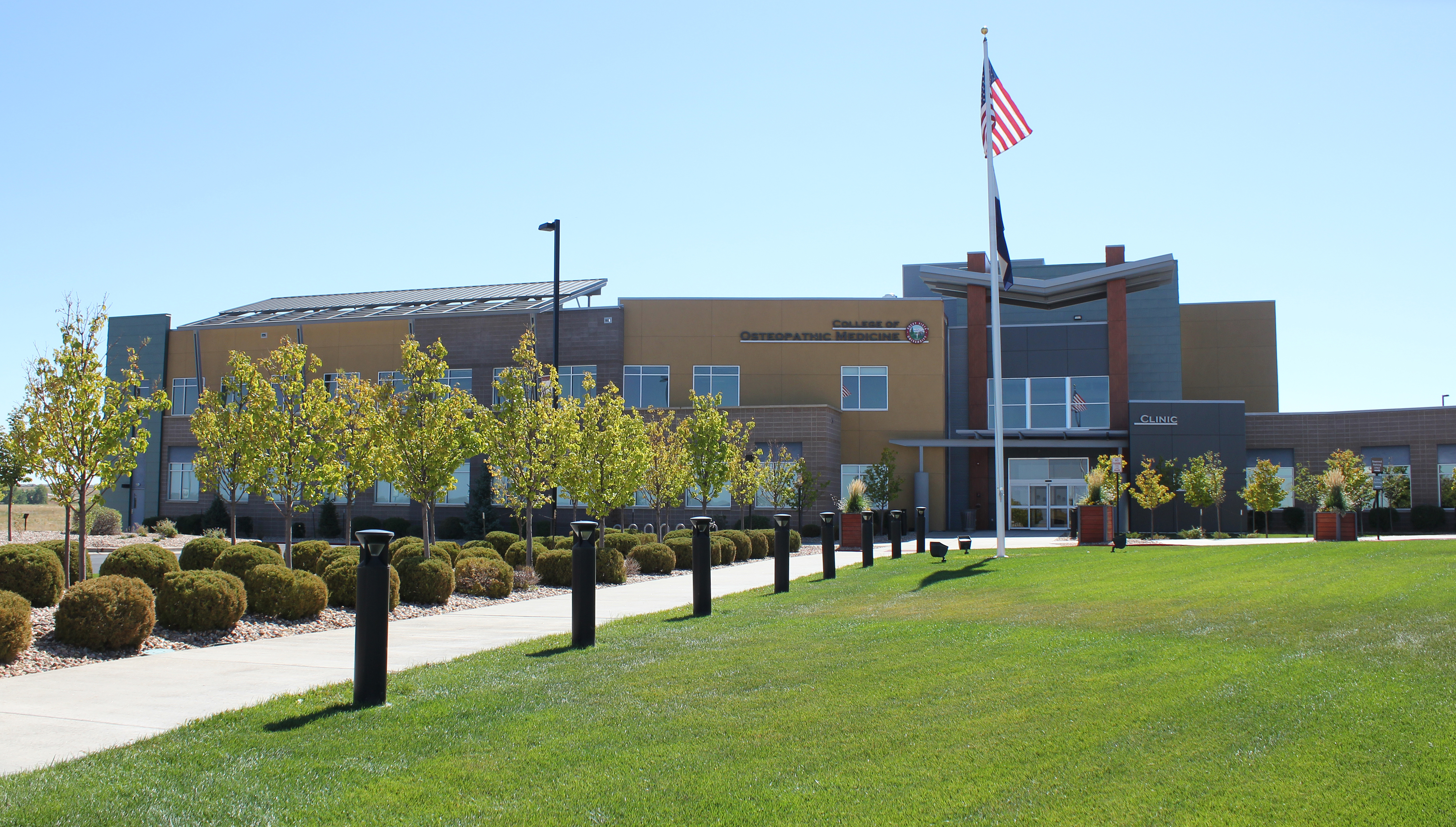
The college in 2015

RVU offers a Doctor of Osteopathic Medicine (DO) degree at the Colorado, Utah, and Montana campuses. Years 1 and 2 of the program consist primarily of classroom-based learning, focusing on the basic health sciences. Years 3 and 4 of the curriculum consist of clinical clerkships (rotations) in major medical specialties. Clerkship sites for RVUCOM students include various hospitals and clinics in Colorado, Utah, Wyoming, Idaho, Arizona and South Dakota.

=== Doctor of Nurse Anesthesia Practice (DNAP) ===
The Doctor of Nurse Anesthesia Practice (DNAP) program will be offered at the Colorado Campus.

=== Master's degrees ===
A Master of Physician Assistant Studies (MPAS) program is offered at the Colorado campus. The MPAS curriculum is adapted from a competency-based model. A Master of Science in Biomedical Sciences (MSBS) program is offered at the Colorado and Utah campuses. And a Master of Medical Sciences (MMS) program is offered at the Montana campus.

== For-profit status ==
RVU is the first modern day, for-profit medical school operating in the United States. As such, its opening generated controversy. Critics raise concerns that a for-profit school will be beholden to investors, and lack credibility. Supporters say that the school is held to the same academic and accreditation standards as other medical schools.

Rocky Vista LLC was founded by Yife Tien and his wife Lucy Chua Tien in 2006 and governed by a board of trustees. Castle Pines Holdings LLC was established as a holding company to control the Tiens' interest in Rocky Vista LLC and provide stability in the event of Tien's death or incapacity. In 2019, the ownership of Rocky Vista University was transferred to Medforth Global Healthcare Education, the owner-operator of St. George's University in Grenada.

== Graduate medical education ==
Parkview Medical Center in Pueblo, Colorado, has been awarded a five-year $770,000 federal grant from the U.S. Health Resources and Services Administration (HRSA) to train primary care internal medicine residents. Parkview has developed a new osteopathic internal medicine residency program which matriculated its first trainees in July 2012. The grant was a joint effort of Parkview Medical Center and Rocky Vista University along with the Center for Medical Education Excellence (formerly known as Rocky Mountain OPTI). RVUCOM and the Center for Medical Education Excellence are currently working to establish additional residency programs in Colorado and Wyoming.

HealthONE/Sky Ridge Medical Center in Lone Tree, Colorado is also a participant in the Center for Medical Education Excellence, and is the site of an internal medicine residency program which collaborates with RVU.

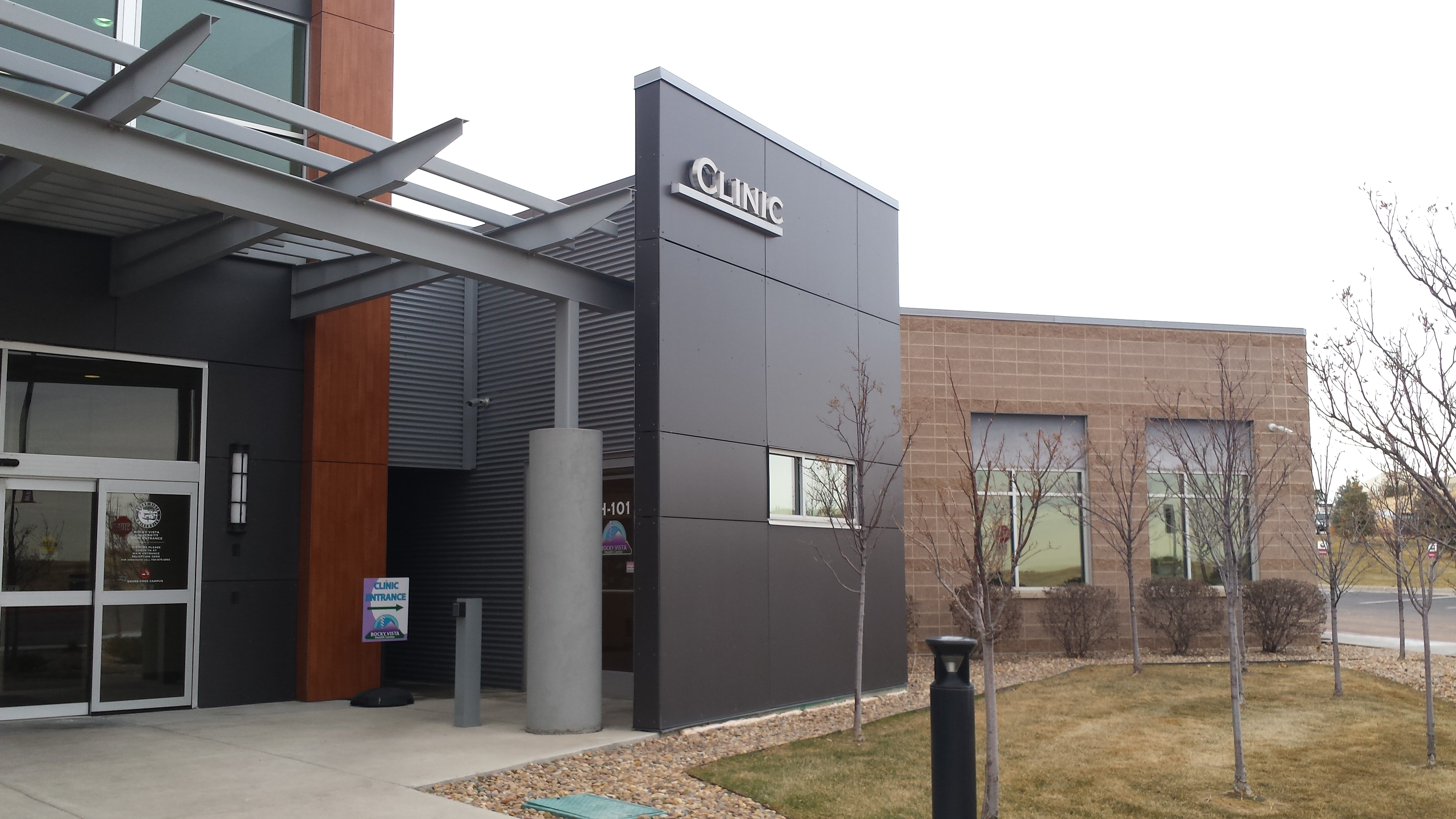
The Rocky Vista Health Center (RVHC) main entrance in 2017

== Rocky Vista Health Center ==
RVU owns and operates the health clinic, Rocky Vista Health Center (RVHC), located on the Parker, Colorado campus. The clinic is a primary care medical facility which provides continued health care and health maintenance for its patients. In addition to primary care, the clinic provides services in internal medicine, sports medicine, and osteopathic manipulation. The clinic employs board certified M.D. and D.O. physicians as well as resident physicians.

Advanced medical students of the college are periodically selected to work in the health clinic as Osteopathic Manipulative Medicine (OMM) Fellows. Under the supervision of board-certified physicians, these students provide osteopathic manipulation to patients at discounted rates. The clinic accepts Medicaid and Medicare patients to help the underserved in the Denver and Parker area.

== See also ==
- List of medical schools in the United States
- Osteopathic medicine in the United States
