= Tom Gores =

American businessman and investor (born 1964)

- Born: Tewfiq Georgious; July 31, 1964 (age 62); Nazareth, Israel
- Education: Michigan State University (BS)
- Occupation: Businessman
- Title: Chairman and CEO of Platinum Equity LLC; Owner of Palace Sports and Entertainment
- Spouse: Holly Gores (m. 1995)
- Children: 3
- Relatives: Alec Gores (brother); Sam Gores (brother); Eric Gores (nephew)
- Website: tomgores.com

Tom Gores (born Tewfiq Georgious, Arabic: توفيق جورجيوس; Greek: Τεουφίκ Γεωργίου; Hebrew: תאופיק ג'ורג'יוס; July 31, 1964) is an American-Israeli billionaire businessman. He is the founder of Platinum Equity, a private equity firm headquartered in Beverly Hills, California. In June 2011, Gores and Platinum Equity became the owners of the National Basketball Association's Detroit Pistons. He became the sole owner in 2015. As of March 2026, his net worth was estimated at $10.1 billion.

== Early life and education ==
Gores was born in Nazareth, Israel on July 31, 1964. He was the fifth of six children in a Christian family with a Greek father and a Lebanese mother. When he was around five years old, he and his family left Nazareth and settled in Genesee, Michigan, located 10 miles northeast of Flint. His first job involved stocking shelves at his uncle's grocery store in Genesee. While a student at Genesee High School, Gores played defensive back in football, middle infielder in baseball, and guard in basketball.

After high school, he attended Michigan State University, where he worked as a janitor and telemarketer. He graduated in 1986 with a bachelor's degree in construction management.

== Career ==
=== Early career and Platinum Equity ===
After college, Gores had a short stint at Continental Telephone before helping found a lumber-logistics software firm (Ventech). In 1989, he and his wife drove from Michigan to Los Angeles in a used Cadillac to run the firm's West Coast operations. In 1995, Gores founded Platinum Equity in his home in Sherman Oaks. At the outset, Gores cold-called businesses to see if they had any divisions they were looking to offload. He found his first project with Litigation Services, Inc. (LSI), a then unprofitable firm that created computer-generated re-creations of accidents for courtroom evidence and testimony. He acquired it for $200,000, reorganized some of the corporate structure, and returned it to profitability within six months. Between 1996 and 2001, Gores led 32 acquisitions, including those of Pilot Software, Racal, and Williams Communications. By the following year, Platinum Equity's portfolio included units of Motorola, Fujitsu, and Alcatel.

Gores was first listed on the Forbes 400 list of the wealthiest Americans in 2002. In 2006, he led a deal to acquire PNA Steel, ultimately selling it to Reliance Steel & Aluminum Co. in 2008 for a net profit of $512 million. In May 2009, Gores purchased The San Diego Union-Tribune for an estimated $30 million (the newspaper was sold in 2011 for $110 million). By 2009, Gores had facilitated in excess of 100 deals through Platinum Equity.

=== Acquisition of the Detroit Pistons ===
Gores had shown interest in purchasing and was one of the front runners to become the owner of the NBA's Detroit Pistons after the death of the long-time owner, Bill Davidson, in 2009. In October 2010, it was reported that then-Detroit Red Wings and Detroit Tigers owner, Mike Ilitch, would purchase Detroit's NBA franchise. But, after Ilitch's exclusive 30-day negotiating period with Davidson's widow (Karen) ended, Gores showed renewed interest. He secured an exclusive negotiating period of his own in January 2011 and was presumed to become the next owner of the Pistons.

On June 1, 2011, Gores and Platinum Equity bought Palace Sports and Entertainment (PS&E) (the parent company of the Pistons and their former arena, The Palace of Auburn Hills) becoming the third owner in the franchise's 70-year history. The purchase price of $325 million was referred to as a "shocking bargain" by Crain's Detroit Business, although, in January 2011, Forbes had valued it at only $35 million more than eventual purchase price. Early in his tenure as owner, Gores approved $10-million worth of renovations to the Palace of Auburn Hills. He also instituted programs like "Seats for Soldiers"—which provides free tickets for PS&E events to U.S. military members and their families— and "Come Together"—a program celebrating community service, leadership, and volunteerism throughout Michigan.

In September 2015, Gores purchased Platinum Equity's stake in the Pistons to become the franchise's sole owner. He had previously held a 51% stake while Platinum held 49%.

=== MLS expansion, further work with Pistons, and other business dealings ===
In April 2016, Gores and Cleveland Cavaliers owner Dan Gilbert announced their intention to bring a Major League Soccer franchise to Detroit, although that proposal seems to have failed as MLS pursued other expansion options. In July 2024, MLS Commissioner Don Garber announced an end to MLS expansion "for a period of time, until we're ready to expand again."

Later in 2016, Gores reached an agreement with the Ilitches (who own Olympia Entertainment and the Detroit Red Wings and Tigers) to allow the Pistons to share the new Little Caesars Arena in downtown Detroit with the Red Wings. The deal went into effect at the beginning of the 2017 season and marked the first time the Pistons regularly played in the city of Detroit proper since 1978. Gores and the Ilitches entered into another joint venture with their businesses (PS&E and Olympia Entertainment) called "313 Presents." The new business schedules shows and handles production, marketing, and media for the six Detroit-area venues owned between the two companies.

As of February 2018, the Pistons were valued at $1.1 billion, a gain of $775 million since Gores' purchase in 2011. In June 2018, Gores hired former Toronto Raptors head coach and the reigning NBA Coach of the Year, Dwane Casey. Outside of sports, he has also acquired numerous properties usually in the Los Angeles area, including 301 North Carolwood Drive in Holmby Hills.

In October 2024, Gores purchased a 27% stake in the Los Angeles Chargers.

== Philanthropy ==
In 2016, Gores launched FlintNOW, an organization designed to raise up to $10 million to provide relief to residents of Flint, Michigan, affected by the city's water crisis. Since 2009, Gores has donated toys to children in Detroit and Flint through the Toys for Tots program. Other Detroit area organizations to which Gores has given substantial support include the Jalen Rose Leadership Academy and S.A.Y Detroit. At the conclusion of the Pistons 2018–2019 season he made a donation of $255,000 to S.A.Y Detroit which was the result of a pledge Gores made during the annual radiothon to donate $5,000 for every Pistons win during the regular season and a $50,000 bonus for making the Playoffs.

Gores supports several philanthropic and charitable organizations. He served on the board of trustees of the Los Angeles County Museum of Art (LACMA) until October 2020 and was also a member of the board of directors at both St. Joseph's Hospital and the UCLA Medical Center. Gores and his family help to support Children's Hospital Los Angeles and, in particular, the Division of Clinical Immunology and Allergy. In 2016, Gores and his wife Holly donated $5 million to the hospital to establish the Gores Family Allergy center, which helps provide comprehensive care and research in allergy studies.

In 2022, Gores gifted $20 million in order to construct a community center in Detroit's River Rouge Park. The announcement came as one of the first in a run of initiatives for the Gores Family Foundation. The center is a 25,000-square-foot multi-use facility and will be the hosting location for a diverse range of programming for the area. The foundation worked with Detroit's Parks and Recreation Department.

== Personal life ==
Gores is Catholic. Gores lives in Beverly Hills, California, with his wife Holly, whom he married in 1995, and three children. He also has a condo in Birmingham, Michigan.

In court testimony related to the Anthony Pellicano wiretapping scandal, Tom's brother Alec revealed that he had hired Pellicano to investigate his first wife after suspecting an affair, which was later confirmed to involve Tom.

Sporting positions
| Preceded by Karen Davidson | Detroit Pistons principal owner 2011–present | Incumbent |
