= East Gores =

Hamlet in Essex, England

Coordinates: 51.882°N 0.731°E

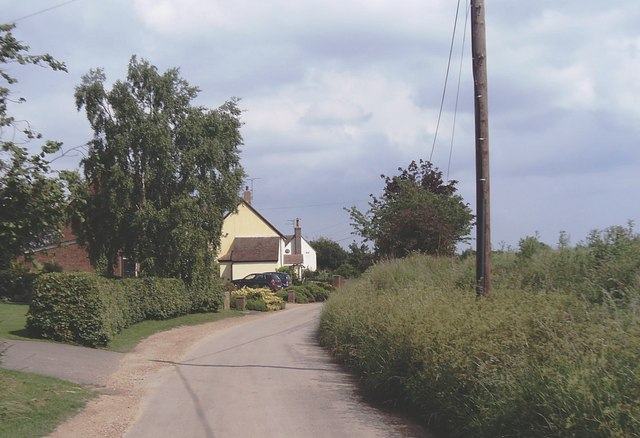
A house in East Gores

East Gores is a hamlet in the Colchester district, in the English county of Essex. It is near the A120 road.
