= Gores Island =

Island in Strangford Lough, County Down, Northern Ireland

Coordinates: 54.37°N 5.66°W

Gores Island, also known as Gore's Island, is an island in Strangford Lough, County Down, Northern Ireland. It is connected to nearby Castle Island, and thence to the mainland, by a narrow roadway (doran) that is passable only at low tides. It has been inhabited previously, but has had no residents since 1910.

== Location and geography ==
Gores Island is located at the southern end of Strangford Lough, in an inlet formed by the mouth of the Quoile River. It is north of the town of Downpatrick, south of Killyleagh and adjacent to Salt Island to the north east and Castle Island to the south west. It has an area of 90 acres (36 ha) and is connected to Castle Island by a raised causeway, which is passable at low tide. The island has two hills, with heights of 88 feet (27 m) and 50 feet (15 m) respectively. At low tide, the shoreline of the island is surrounded by an area of exposed soft mud, which can be treacherous.

== History ==
Amongst the island's last inhabitants were farmer Samuel Spratt, who died in 1898, and his widow Jane Spratt, who died on the island in 1910 at the age of 98, having lived there for seventy years. In the 1940s and 1950s, having been uninhabited for several decades, the island was used as a summer-camp venue for boys and girls from Industrial Schools and borstals such as the Malone Training School in Belfast. In recent years the island has been used by the nearby Quoile Yacht Club for an annual "Gore's Island Race".

== Flora and fauna ==
The island features a number of butterfly features, including Pieris rapae, Pieris napi, the Small tortoiseshell (Aglais urticae), Aglais io, and Vanessa cardui.
