= Alec Gores =

Israeli-American businessman (born 1953)

Alec E. Gores
- Born: Elias Georgious; 1953 (age 72–73); Nazareth, Israel
- Education: Western Michigan University
- Occupation: Businessman
- Spouses: Lisa (div. 2001); Kelly Noonan (m. 2016; div. 2024)
- Children: 6, including Eric
- Relatives: Tom Gores (brother); Sam Gores (brother)

Alec E. Gores (born Elias Georgious in 1953; Arabic: إلياس جورجيوس; Greek: Ηλίας Γεωργίου; Hebrew: אליאס ג'ורג'יוס) is an American billionaire businessman. He began making his fortune through leveraged buyouts of technology firms at The Gores Group. He has also been instrumental in popularizing SPACs, beginning in the mid-2010s.

== Early life ==
Gores was born in 1953 in Nazareth, Israel. He was born to a Christian family with a father of Greek descent and a mother of Lebanese descent. His family moved to Flint, Michigan, in November 1968 when he was 15 years old. He began working at his uncle's store in Flint, bagging groceries for 25 cents an hour. He attended Genesee High School in Genesee, Michigan. He obtained a degree in computer science from Western Michigan University, and was the first in his family to attend college.

== Career ==
Gores began working for General Motors after completing college. He left within six months, starting his own company that bought and distributed computers. In 1978, he founded Executive Business Systems with an $8,000 investment from his father. By 1986, the company employed over 200 people and was acquired by Contel for approximately $10 million.

Following the acquisition, Gores began acquiring and operating non-core businesses. In 1987 he founded The Gores Group, a private equity firm that has since acquired or invested in over 130 companies. Gores pioneered the operational approach to private equity investing, initially deploying his own personal capital, followed by ~$4 billion of institutional capital across multiple investment vehicles. Marquee investments during this time included the carve-out of The Learning Company from Mattel; Verifone from HP; Therakos from Johnson & Johnson; Lineage, which ultimately sold to GE; and Sagemcom, which evolved into one of France's premier technology companies.

Gores and his brother Tom have been involved in a number of deals together including the 2011 acquisition of Alliance Entertainment, which distributes DVDs, CDs and video games to stores such as Barnes & Noble, Amazon.com and Target.

In 2020, Forbes ranked Gores No. 391 on the Forbes 400 list of America's wealthiest people. He was selected as 2021 Business Person of the Year by LA Business Journal. Gores has also been profiled in The Wall Street Journal.

Gores launched Gores Holdings VII and Gores Holdings VIII in 2021, and publicly filed for Gores Technology Partners and Gores Technology Partners II, as well as Gores Guggenheim, the latter in partnership with Guggenheim Partners.

== Personal life ==
As of 2009, Gores is a practicing Catholic. His first marriage was to Lisa, which ended in a divorce in 2001. In court testimony related to the Anthony Pellicano wiretapping scandal, Gores revealed that he had hired Pellicano to investigate Lisa after suspecting an affair, and that Pellicano confirmed she was involved with Gores's own brother, Tom. His second marriage was to director Kelly Noonan Gores in October 2016 and ended in a divorce in 2024. He has five children from his first marriage and a daughter from his second. He is the older brother of Tom Gores, founder of Platinum Equity, and Sam Gores, the head of Paradigm Talent Agency.

Gores commissioned the 2005 film The Kid & I, which co-stars his son Eric.

In 2011, Gores, along with Tobey Maguire, allegedly won portions of money that hedge fund manager Brad Ruderman embezzled as part of a weekly poker game; Gores was sued by Ruderman for the winnings earned at these underground Beverly Hills poker games. The lawsuit was settled later in 2011, with Gores agreeing to pay $49,908 over Ruderman's poker payments. Ruderman was later convicted for defrauding investors in a Ponzi scheme of $25 million.

== See also ==
- List of largest houses in the Los Angeles Metropolitan Area
