= Liao Yibai =

Chinese sculptor

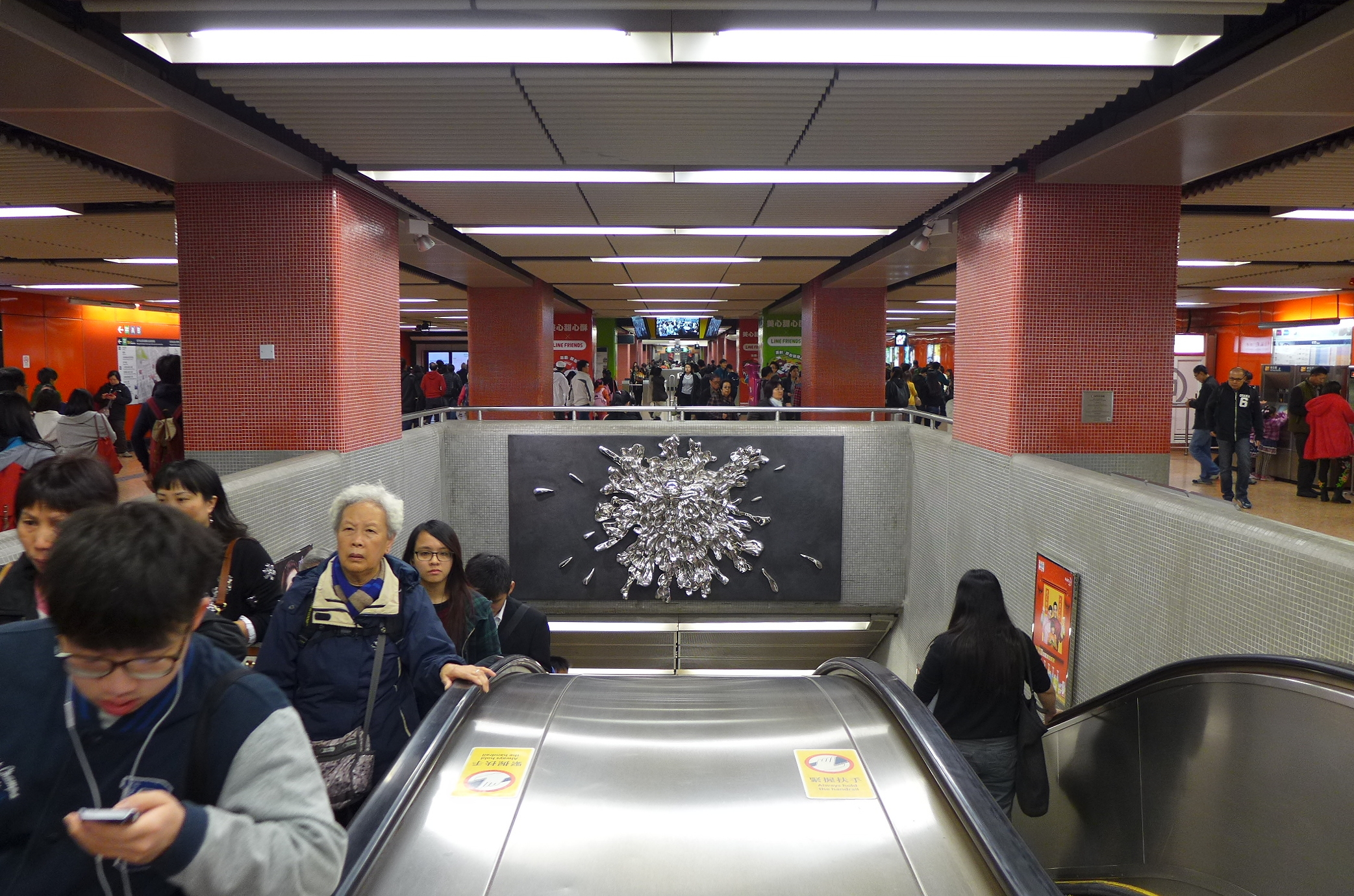
2012 sculpture Like Water by Liao Yibai in Mong Kok station, Hong Kong.

Liao Yibai (廖一百, Jiangan, 1971) is a Chinese sculptor who specializes in giant silver stainless steel pop-art sculptures. One of his best known works is a giant "fake Leica". He was the subject of a 22 min American documentary film Imaginary Enemy in 2010, directed by Liz Daggett.
