= Belmont College =

Community college in St. Clairsville, Ohio, US

Coordinates: 40°04′36″N 80°57′56″W

- Former name: Belmont Technical College
- Type: Public community college
- Established: 1971; 55 years ago
- Parent institution: University System of Ohio
- President: Paul Gasparro
- Students: 721
- Location: St. Clairsville, Ohio, United States
- Campus: Rural
- Colors: Blue and White
- Website: www.belmontcollege.edu

Belmont College is a public community college in St. Clairsville, Ohio, United States. The college's main campus is in St. Clairsville with other locations including the Monroe County Center in Woodsfield, Ohio and the North Center in Cadiz, Ohio. Belmont College is accredited by the Higher Learning Commission (HLC).
