= Eric Gores =

American actor

- Born: 1983 (age 42–43)
- Occupation: Film actor
- Parent: Alec Gores

Eric Gores (born 1983) is the son of businessman and Forbes billionaire Alec Gores, and former neighbor of actor Tom Arnold. In 2005, Gores costarred in a film written by Arnold, The Kid & I. Gores was born with cerebral palsy.

Gores was educated in Holland, Michigan. He attended Lakewood Elementary, and Macatawa Bay middle School. He graduated West Ottawa High School in 2004 and studied acting at the Lee Strasberg Theatre Institute.
