= Beverly Glen Boulevard =

Road in Los Angeles, California

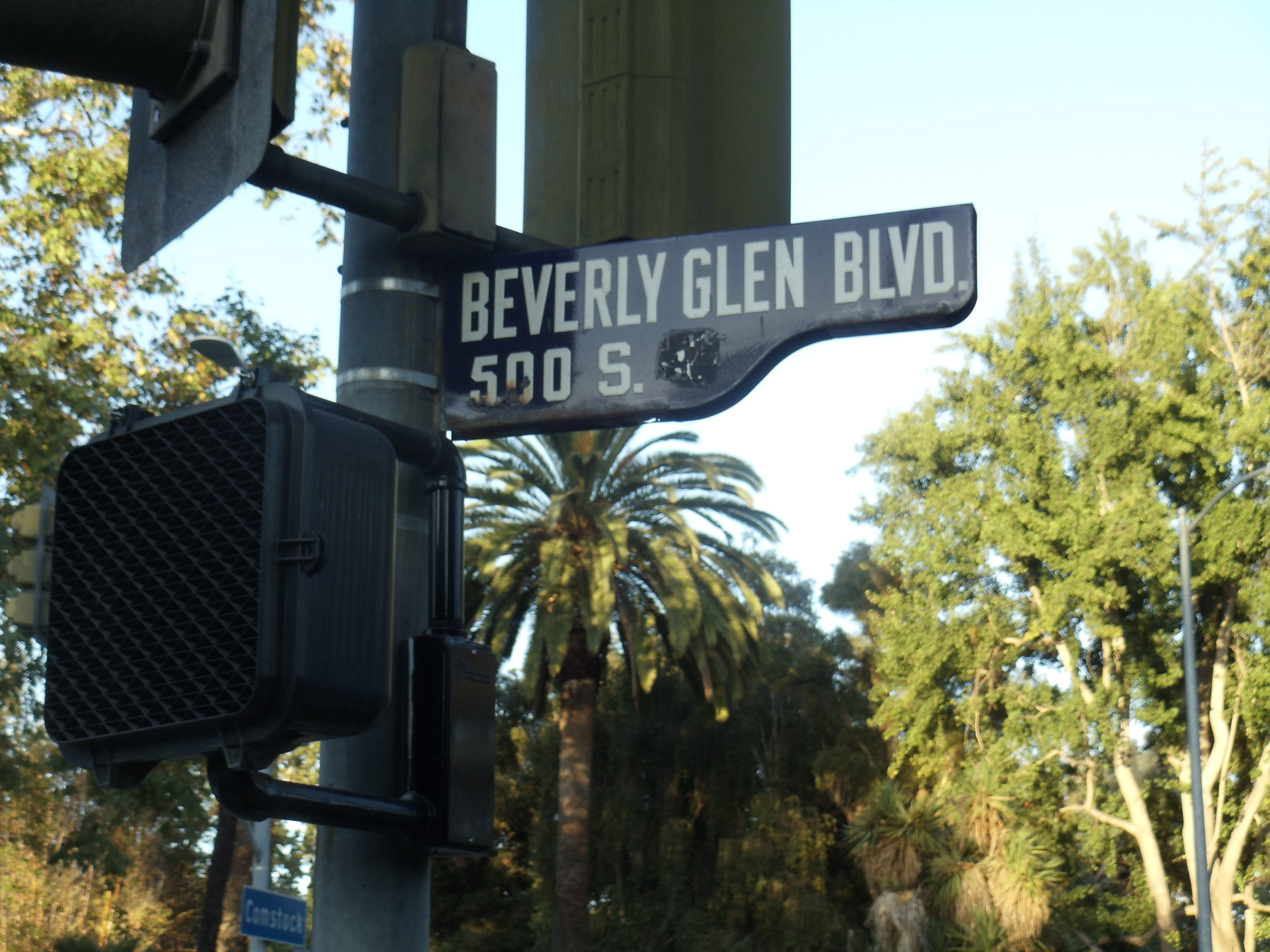
- Beverly Glen Boulevard sign in Holmby Hills, California
- Length: 17.3 mi (27.8 km)
- South end: Pico Boulevard in West Los Angeles
- North end: Ventura Boulevard in Sherman Oaks

Beverly Glen Boulevard is one of six major routes that connect the Westside of Los Angeles to the San Fernando Valley (the other five are the I-405, Sepulveda Boulevard, Topanga Canyon Boulevard, Laurel Canyon Boulevard, and Coldwater Canyon Avenue.

It starts at Rancho Park Golf Course on Pico Boulevard in West Los Angeles. It proceeds to intersect with Santa Monica and Wilshire boulevards, passing near Century City, Sinai Temple and Los Angeles Country Club. The road marks the eastern border of the Westwood Prosperity Unit development built by Janss Investment Company as the foundation of the Westwood neighborhood of Los Angeles.

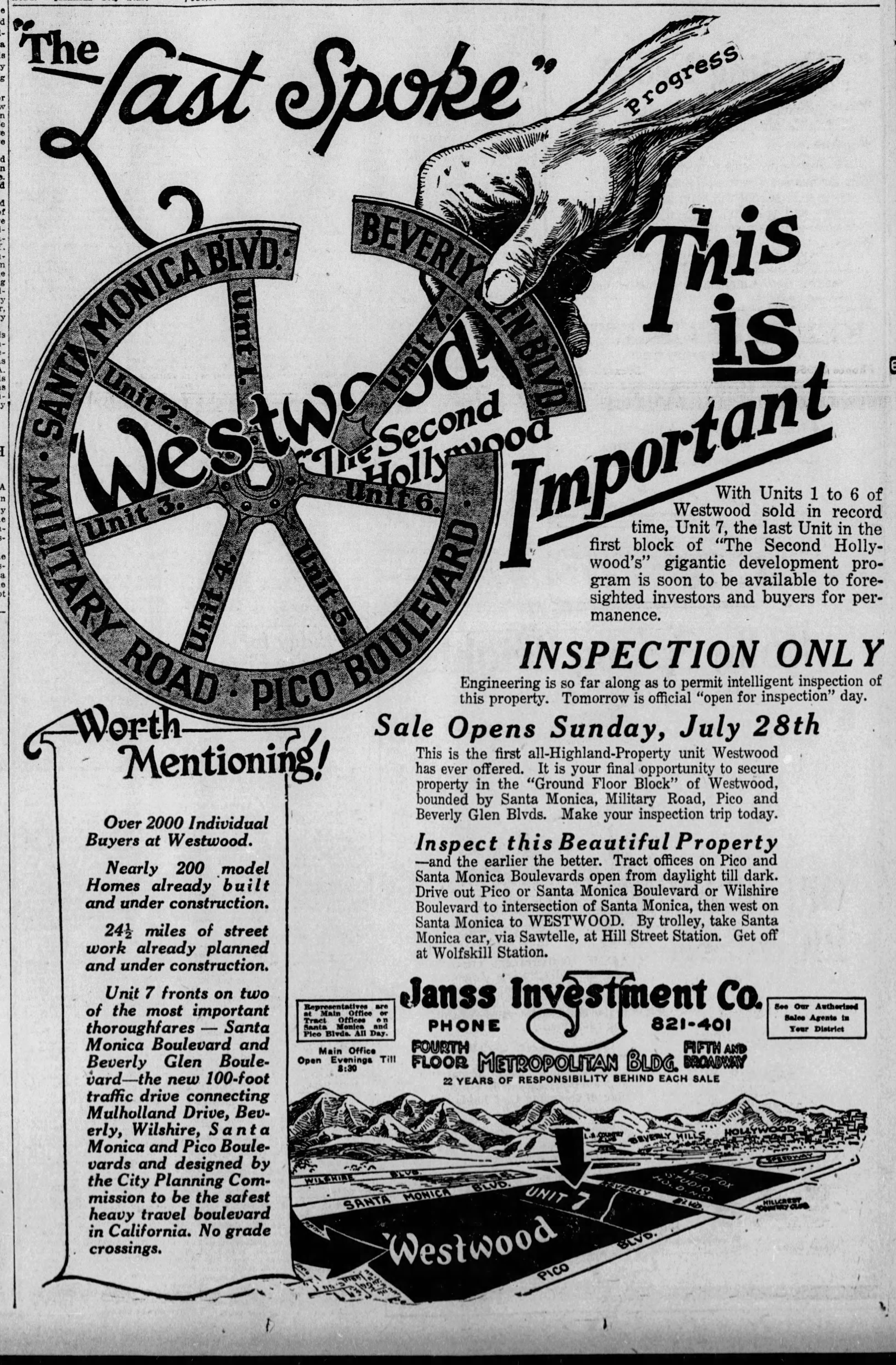
"Janss Investment Co. " Los Angeles Times, July 1, 1923

As the road travels further north, it intersects with Sunset Boulevard near UCLA and passes the gated communities of Bel Air and the middle school campus of the Harvard-Westlake School. The hills through which the boulevard passes north of Sunset and south of Mulholland Drive is known as Beverly Glen. Beverly Glen runs parallel to the wealthy section of Bel-Air and its gated communities. The housing development at Beverly Glen and Mulholland was laid out in the 1950s and was originally known as Glen-Aire.

After passing Mulholland, Beverly Glen Boulevard swerves west and passes through the exclusive hillside homes in Sherman Oaks. "Stilt Street" is a row of twenty stilt houses designed by architect Richard Neutra that perch on the steep hillside above the boulevard. The road ends at Ventura Boulevard in the south end of the Valley. Commuters seeking to go further north into the Valley go one block west to Van Nuys Boulevard which spans most of the Valley's length.

Beverly Glen Boulevard is east of Sepulveda Boulevard and the San Diego Freeway (I-405). When traffic on I-405 becomes unbearable, many commuters take Beverly Glen or Sepulveda instead, causing considerable congestion on both streets.
