= Mulholland Drive =

Street and road in Southern California

Coordinates: 34.1313°N 118.49°W

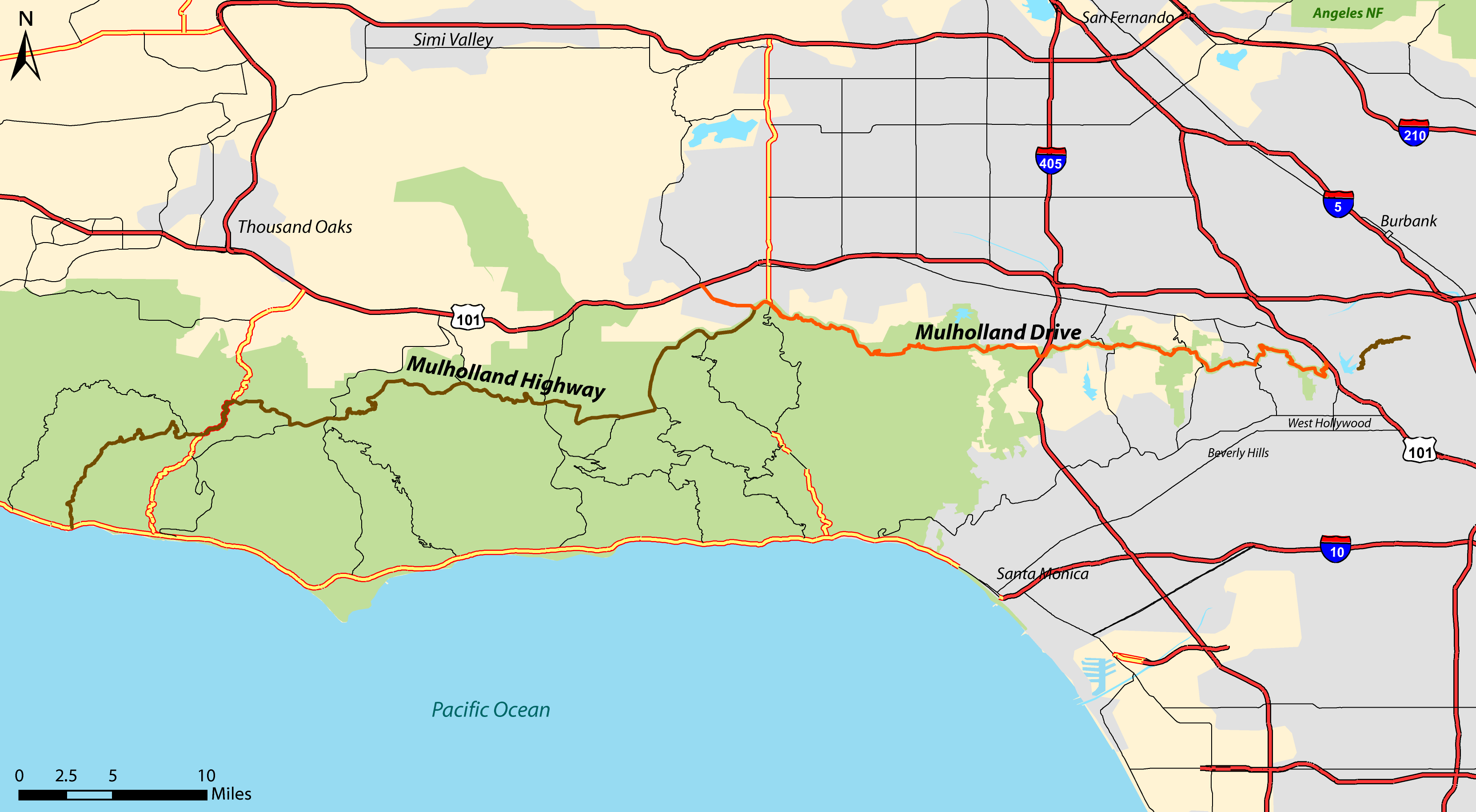
- Map of Mulholland Drive (orange) and Mulholland Highway (brown) in Los Angeles County
- Interactive map of Mulholland Drive
- Namesake: William Mulholland
- Maintained by: Bureau of Street Services, City of L.A. DPW
- Length: 21 mi (34 km)
- West end: US 101 (Ventura Fwy) in Woodland Hills
- Major junctions: Mulholland Highway; SR 27 (Topanga Canyon Boulevard); I-405 / Skirball Ctr Dr to Sepulveda Blvd; Beverly Glen Blvd; Coldwater Canyon Ave; Laurel Canyon Blvd
- East end: US 101 (Hollywood Fwy)/Cahuenga Blvd in the Hollywood Hills

Mulholland Drive is a street and road in the eastern Santa Monica Mountains of Southern California. It is named after pioneering Los Angeles civil engineer William Mulholland. The western rural portion in Los Angeles and Ventura counties is named Mulholland Highway. The road is featured in a significant number of films, songs, and novels. David Lynch, who wrote and directed a film named after Mulholland Drive, has said that one can feel "the history of Hollywood" on it. Jack Nicholson has lived on Mulholland Drive for many years, and still did as of 2025.

== Name ==
Mulholland Drive was named after William Mulholland, designer of the Los Angeles aqueduct, Mulholland Dam, and Lake Hollywood.

== Geography ==
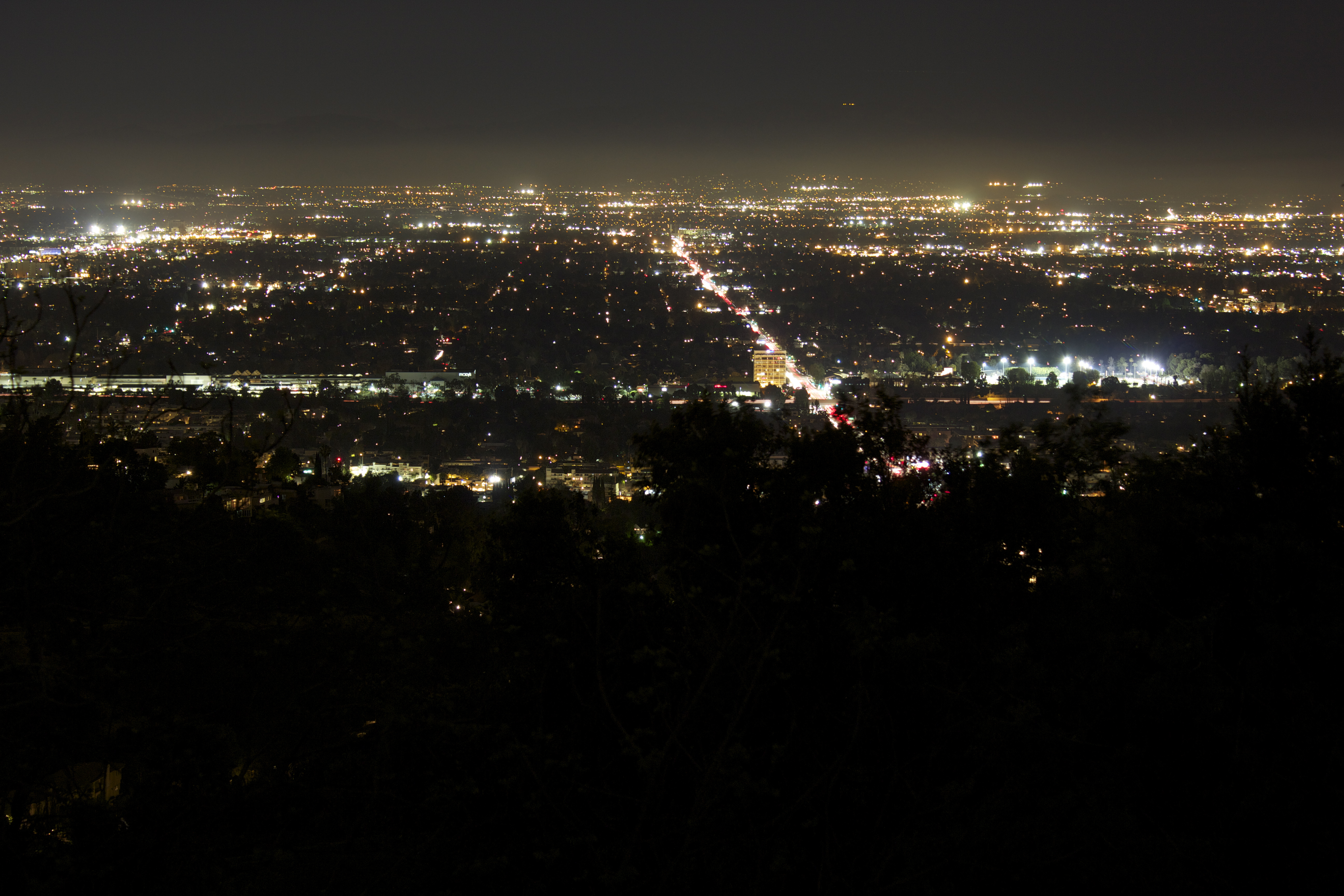
San Fernando Valley at night from Mulholland Drive

The 21-mile (34 km) long mostly two-lane, minor arterial road loosely follows the ridgeline of the eastern Santa Monica Mountains and the Hollywood Hills, connecting two sections of U.S. Route 101, and crossing Sepulveda Boulevard, Beverly Glen Boulevard, Coldwater Canyon Avenue, Laurel Canyon Boulevard, Nichols Canyon Road, and Outpost Drive.

The road offers views of the Los Angeles Basin, the San Fernando Valley, Downtown Los Angeles and the Hollywood Sign.

Mulholland Drive has some of the most exclusive and expensive homes in the world, housing mainly Hollywood celebrities.

== Route ==
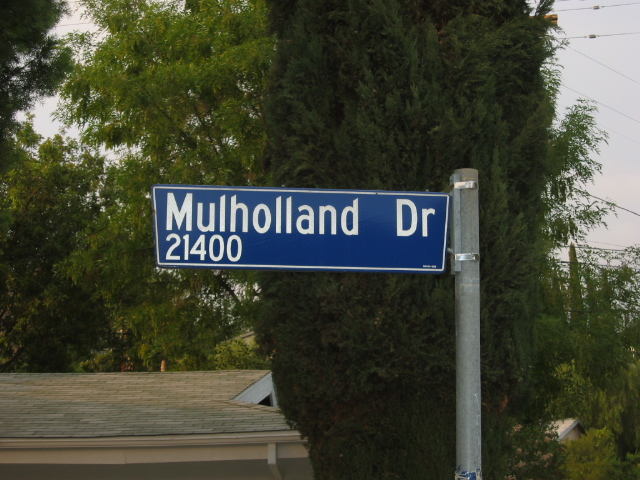
A Mulholland Drive street sign in a residential neighborhood in Woodland Hills.

The eastern terminus of Mulholland Drive is at its intersection with Cahuenga Boulevard at the Cahuenga Pass over the Santa Monica Mountains (at this point Cahuenga Boulevard runs adjacent to Highway 101/The Hollywood Freeway). The road continues to the west, offering vistas of the Hollywood Sign, Downtown Los Angeles, and then Burbank, Universal City, and the rest of the San Fernando Valley with the San Gabriel, Verdugo, and Santa Susana Mountains.

The road winds along the top of the mountains until a few miles west of the San Diego/Interstate 405 Freeway. Just west of the intersection with Encino Hills Drive, it becomes an unpaved road not open to motor vehicles. This part is known by many as "Dirt Mulholland". This portion connects with other unpaved roads and bike trails and allows access to a decommissioned Project Nike command post that is now a Cold War memorial park. (This portion of Mulholland Drive was open to through traffic as late as the 1990s before being permanently closed to motor vehicles so that they would no longer interfere with the natural beauty and wilderness of the area.)

The road opens again east of Topanga Canyon Boulevard (State Route 27) at Santa Maria Road but remains dirt until it reaches Saltillo Street. Shortly thereafter, the thoroughfare splits into Mulholland Drive and Mulholland Highway. Mulholland Drive terminates at U.S. Highway 101 (the Ventura Freeway), where it becomes Valley Circle Boulevard. Mulholland Highway continues to the southwest until it terminates at State Route 1 (PCH) in Leo Carrillo State Park at the Pacific Ocean coast and the border of Los Angeles and Ventura counties.

== History ==
The main portion of the road, from Cahuenga Pass in Hollywood westward past Sepulveda Pass, was originally called Mulholland Highway and was opened in 1924. It was built by a consortium of developers investing in the Hollywood Hills. DeWitt Reaburn, the construction engineer responsible for the project, said while it was being built, "The Mulholland Highway is destined to be one of the heaviest traveled and one of the best known scenic roads in the United States."

In the early 1970s, five thousand local activists successfully prevented the paving of the unpaved section of Mulholland Drive now known as "Dirt Mulholland."

The street has experienced multiple closures throughout the years due to mudslides and storm damage, with the latest one being in 2024.

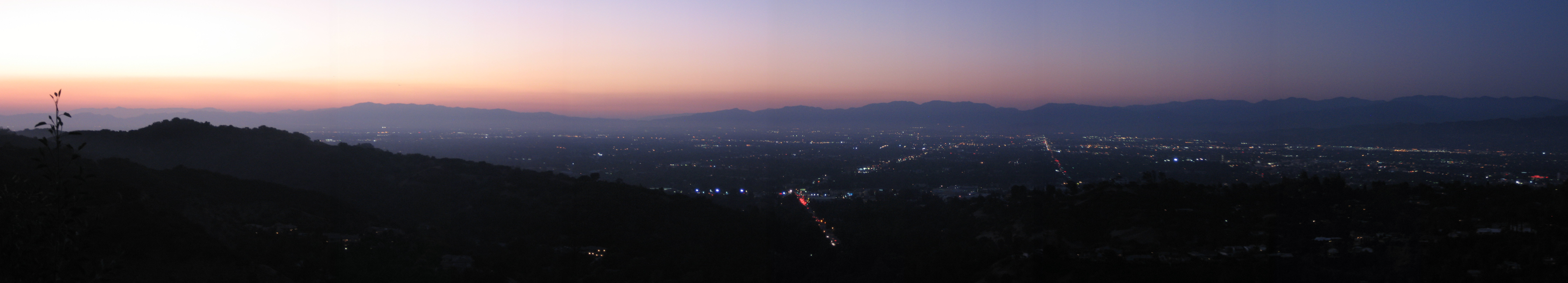
View at dusk from Mulholland Drive across the southeast San Fernando Valley

== See also ==
- Mulholland Highway
- Santa Monica Mountains
- Santa Monica Mountains National Recreation Area
