= List of largest houses in the United States =

This is a list of the largest extant and historic houses in the United States, ordered by area of the main house. The list includes houses that have been demolished, houses that are currently under construction, and buildings that are not currently, but were previously used as private homes. Inclusion on this list is restricted to houses that are 40,000 square feet (3,700 m^{2}) or larger in total area.

== Largest houses ==
Rank	Area	Name	Location	Built for	Owner	Year completed	Architectural style	Architect	Image
1	178,926 sq ft (16,622.8 m^{2})	Biltmore Estate	Asheville, North Carolina	George Washington Vanderbilt II	The Biltmore Company	1895	Châteauesque	Richard Morris Hunt	Biltmore Estate, Asheville, North Carolina
2	174,240 sq ft (16,187 m^{2})	Shadow Brook	Stockbridge, Massachusetts	Anson Phelps Stokes	(destroyed by fire in 1956)	1893	Tudor Revival	H. Neill Wilson	
3	109,848 sq ft (10,205.2 m^{2})	Lynnewood Hall	Elkins Park, Pennsylvania	Peter A. B. Widener	Lynnewood Hall Preservation Foundation	1899	Neoclassical	Horace Trumbauer	
4	109,000 sq ft (10,100 m^{2})	Oheka Castle	West Hills, New York	Otto Hermann Kahn	Gary Melius	1919	Châteauesque	Delano and Aldrich	
5	100,000 sq ft (9,300 m^{2})	Whitemarsh Hall	Wyndmoor, Pennsylvania	Edward T. Stotesbury	(demolished in 1980)	1917	Neoclassical	Horace Trumbauer	
6	97,188 sq ft (9,029.1 m^{2})	Arden House	Harriman, New York	Edward Henry Harriman	Mo Tianquan (via Research Center on Natural Conservation)	1909	Châteauesque	Carrère and Hastings	
7	96,582 sq ft (8,972.8 m^{2})	Winterthur	Winterthur, Delaware	Henry Francis du Pont	Winterthur Museum, Garden and Library	1932	Georgian Revival	Henry Francis du Pont	
8	90,000 sq ft (8,400 m^{2})	Shadow Lawn	West Long Branch, New Jersey	Hubert T. Parson	Monmouth University	1927	Beaux-Arts	Horace Trumbauer	
9	88,000 sq ft (8,200 m^{2})	Meadow Brook Hall	Rochester Hills, Michigan	Matilda Dodge Wilson	Oakland University	1929	Tudor Revival	Smith Hinchman & Grylls	
10	85,000 sq ft (7,900 m^{2})	Versailles	Windermere, Florida	David A. Siegel		(under construction)	Châteauesque		
11 (tie)	80,000 sq ft (7,400 m^{2})	Harbor Hill	Roslyn, New York	Clarence H. Mackay	(demolished in 1947)	1899	Châteauesque	McKim Mead & White	
11 (tie)	80,000 sq ft (7,400 m^{2})	Coindre Hall	Huntington, New York	George McKesson Brown	Suffolk County Department of Parks, Recreation & Conservation	1910	Renaissance Revival, Châteauesque	Clarence Sumner Luce and J.V. Schafer	
13	78,125 sq ft (7,258.1 m^{2})	Cornelius Vanderbilt II House	New York, New York	Cornelius Vanderbilt II	(demolished in 1926)	1882	Châteauesque	George B. Post	
14	75,000 sq ft (7,000 m^{2})	Indian Neck Hall	Oakdale, New York	Frederick Gilbert Bourne	St. John's University	1908	Federal Style	Ernest Flagg	
15	74,000 sq ft (6,900 m^{2})	The One	Bel Air, Los Angeles, California	Nile Niami	Richard Saghian	2021	Contemporary	Paul McClean	
16	72,215 sq ft (6,709.0 m^{2})	Pensmore	Highlandville, Missouri	Steven T. Huff		2016	Châteauesque		
17 (tie)	72,000 sq ft (6,700 m^{2})	Inisfada	North Hills, New York	Nicholas Frederic Brady	(demolished in 2013)	1919	Tudor Revival	John Torrey Windrim	
17 (tie)	72,000 sq ft (6,700 m^{2})	Belton Court	Barrington, Rhode Island	Frederick Stanhope Peck	Shine Harmony Holdings LLC	1905 and 1927	Medieval Revival	Martin & Hall	
18	71,568 sq ft (6,648.9 m^{2})	Elbridge T. Gerry Mansion	New York, New York	Elbridge Thomas Gerry	(demolished in 1929)	1895	Châteauesque	Richard Morris Hunt	
19 (tie)	70,000 sq ft (6,500 m^{2})	Idle Hour	Oakdale, New York	William K. Vanderbilt	Mercury International LLC	1901	English Country Style	Richard Howland Hunt	
19 (tie)	70,000 sq ft (6,500 m^{2})	Woodlea	Briarcliff Manor, New York	Elliott Fitch Shepard	Sleepy Hollow Country Club	1895	Italian Renaissance Revival	McKim, Mead & White	
21	68,500 sq ft (6,360 m^{2})	Hearst Castle	San Simeon, California	William Randolph Hearst	State of California	1947	Spanish Colonial Revival	Julia Morgan	
22	66,341 sq ft (6,163.3 m^{2})	Grey Towers Castle	Glenside, Pennsylvania	William Welsh Harrison	Arcadia University	1896	Gothic Revival	Horace Trumbauer	
23	66,000 sq ft (6,100 m^{2})	Bill Gates's house	Medina, Washington	Bill Gates		1995	Pacific Lodge	James Cutler	
24	65,465 sq ft (6,081.9 m^{2})	Florham	Florham Park, New Jersey	Hamilton and Florence Vanderbilt Twombly	Fairleigh Dickinson University	1897	Georgian Revival	McKim Mead & White	
25	65,000 sq ft (6,000 m^{2})	Eagle Rock	Beverly, Massachusetts	Henry Clay Frick	demolished 1969	1904	Georgian Revival	Arthur Little and Herbert W. C. Browne	
26	64,500 sq ft (5,990 m^{2})	Stan Hywet Hall	Akron, Ohio	Frank Seiberling	Stan Hywet Hall Foundation	1915	Tudor Revival	Charles Sumner Schneider	
27	64,000 sq ft (5,900 m^{2})	Fair Field	Sagaponack, New York	Ira Rennert		2003	Italian Renaissance	Mark Ferguson	
28	62,482 sq ft (5,804.8 m^{2})	The Breakers	Newport, Rhode Island	Cornelius Vanderbilt II	Preservation Society of Newport County	1895	Italian Renaissance	Richard Morris Hunt	
29 (tie)	60,277 sq ft (5,599.9 m^{2})	El Mirasol	Palm Beach, Florida	Edward T. Stotesbury	(demolished in 1958)	1920	Spanish Colonial Revival	Addison Mizner	
29 (tie)	60,277 sq ft (5,599.9 m^{2})	San Sylmar	Sylmar, California	J.B. Nethercutt	Nethercutt–Richards family	1971	Art Deco	Tony Hinsbergen	
31 (tie)	60,000 sq ft (5,600 m^{2})	Pembroke	Glen Cove, New York	Joseph De Lamar	(demolished in 1968)	1916	Neoclassical	C.P.H. Gilbert	
31 (tie)	60,000 sq ft (5,600 m^{2})	Whitehall (Henry M. Flagler House)	Palm Beach, Florida	Henry Flagler	Henry Morrison Flagler Museum	1901	Beaux-Arts	Pottier & Stymus, Carrère and Hastings	
33	58,000 sq ft (5,400 m^{2})	Duke Farms	Hillsborough Township, New Jersey	James Buchanan Duke	(demolished in 2016)	1903	Tudor Revival	Henry H. Kendall	
34	57,000 sq ft (5,300 m^{2})	Eschman Meadows	Nashport, Ohio	Tami Longaberger	Awesome87 LLC and SPG87 LLC	2001	Georgian	George Acock; Phil White	
35	56,881 sq ft (5,284.4 m^{2})	Castle Hill	Ipswich, Massachusetts	Richard T. Crane Jr.	The Trustees of Reservations	1928	English Baroque	David Adler	
36	56,500 sq ft (5,250 m^{2})	The Manor	Los Angeles, California	Aaron Spelling	Eric Schmidt	1988	Châteauesque	James Langenheim & Associates	
37	56,368 sq ft (5,236.8 m^{2})	Andrew Carnegie Mansion	New York, New York	Andrew Carnegie	Smithsonian Institution	1901	Georgian Revival	Babb, Cook & Willard	
38	56,000 sq ft (5,200 m^{2})	Blairsden	Peapack-Gladstone, New Jersey	C. Ledyard Blair	T. Eric Galloway	1903	Châteauesque	Carrère and Hastings	
39	55,360 sq ft (5,143 m^{2})	Ralston Hall	Belmont, California	William Chapman Ralston	Notre Dame de Namur University	1864	Italianate	Henry W. Cleaveland	
40 (tie)	55,000 sq ft (5,100 m^{2})	White House	Washington, D.C.	Federal government		1800	Neoclassical	James Hoban	
40 (tie)	55,000 sq ft (5,100 m^{2})	Elm Court	Lenox, Massachusetts	Emily Thorn Vanderbilt	Travaasa Experiential Resorts	1885	American Shingle Style	Peabody and Stearns	
40 (tie)	55,000 sq ft (5,100 m^{2})	Roundwood Manor	Hunting Valley, Ohio	Van Sweringen brothers	Sylvia Korey	1929	Colonial Revival	Philip Lindsley Small	
43	54,838 sq ft (5,094.6 m^{2})	Dumbarton Oaks	Washington, D.C.	William Hammond Dorsey	Harvard University	1801	Colonial Revival		
44	54,400 sq ft (5,050 m^{2})	Chateau Montagel	Shoal Creek, Alabama	Larry House	R Gold	1997	Châteauesque	Bill Shephard	
45	54,246 sq ft (5,039.6 m^{2})	Searles Castle	Great Barrington, Massachusetts	Mary Hopkins Searles	Hunt Slonem	1883	Châteauesque	McKim Mead & White	
46	53,000 sq ft (4,900 m^{2})	Nottoway	White Castle, Louisiana	John Hampden Randolph	(demolished in 2025)	1858	Greek Revival; Italianate	Henry Howard	
47	52,897 sq ft (4,914.3 m^{2})	Hala Ranch	Aspen, Colorado	Bandar bin Sultan	John Paulson	1991	Rustic	Hagman Yaw	
48	52,300 sq ft (4,860 m^{2})	Felix M. Warburg House	New York, New York	Felix M. Warburg	Jewish Museum of New York	1906	Châteauesque	Charles Pierrepont Henry Gilbert	
49	52,000 sq ft (4,800 m^{2})	Villa de Formosa	Newport Beach, California	Joe C. Wen		2019	Italianate	Brian Biglin	
50	51,000 sq ft (4,700 m^{2})	Hacienda De La Paz	Rolling Hills, California	John Z. Blazevich	John Z. Blazevich	2008	Spanish Colonial Revival	Rafael Manzano Martos	
52	50,853 sq ft (4,724.4 m^{2})	Chase Mansion	West Hartford, Connecticut	Arnold Chase	Arnold Chase	2009	Georgian	Allan Greenberg	
53	50,729 sq ft (4,712.9 m^{2})	Perry Belmont House	Washington, D.C.	Perry Belmont	Order of the Eastern Star	1909	Beaux-Arts	Ernest Sanson; Horace Trumbauer	
54	50,316 sq ft (4,674.5 m^{2})	Otto H. Kahn House	New York, New York	Otto Hermann Kahn	Convent of the Sacred Heart	1914	Renaissance Revival	J. Armstrong Stenhouse; Charles Pierrepont Henry Gilbert	
55	50,302 sq ft (4,673.2 m^{2})	Hillside School	Berkeley, California	Berkeley Unified School District	Sam Seppala	1925	Tudor Revival	Walter H. Ratcliff	
56 (tie)	50,000 sq ft (4,600 m^{2})	Belcourt	Newport, Rhode Island	Oliver Belmont	Carolyn Rafaelian	1894	Châteauesque	Richard Morris Hunt	
56 (tie)	50,000 sq ft (4,600 m^{2})	Hempstead House	Sands Point, New York	Howard Gould	Nassau County, New York	1912	Tudor Revival	Richard Howland Hunt	
58	49,842 sq ft (4,630.5 m^{2})	Lutcher Brown Estate	Terrell Hills, TX	H. Lutcher Brown}	Candace Humphreys	1938	Neo Classical	Robert M. Ayres	
59	49,568 sq ft (4,605.0 m^{2})	8271 E Left Hand Fork Hobble Creek	Springville, Utah	Tom Mower		2010	Italian Renaissance	Kevin Scholz	
60	49,300 sq ft (4,580 m^{2})	The Pritzker Estate	Los Angeles, California	Anthony Pritzker		2010	Contemporary	Grant Camden Kirkpatrick	
61	49,240 sq ft (4,575 m^{2})	32088 SW Peach Cove Road	West Linn, Oregon	Mark Wattles	Richard Stanley	(under construction)			
62	49,000 sq ft (4,600 m^{2})	Ziff Mansion	Pawling, New York	William Bernard Ziff, Jr.	Dirk Edward Ziff	2000			
63	48,515 sq ft (4,507.2 m^{2})	50 Poplar Hill Drive	Farmington, Connecticut	Benjamin Sisti	Casey Askar	1985	Contemporary		
64	48,438 sq ft (4,500.0 m^{2})	1299 Via Tivoli	Seven Hills, Henderson, Nevada	Pierre Omidyar		2010	Modern architecture		
65 (tie)	48,000 sq ft (4,500 m^{2})	Champ d'Or Estate	Hickory Creek, Texas	Alan H. Goldfield	"The Olana" Walter Wedding Estates	2002	French Baroque Architecture		
65 (tie)	48,000 sq ft (4,500 m^{2})	Le Palais	Beverly Hills, California	Mohamed Hadid	Lola Karimova-Tillyaeva	2011	Châteauesque		
67	47,000 sq ft (4,400 m^{2})	Nemours	Wilmington, Delaware	Alfred I. du Pont	Nemours Foundation	1909	Neoclassical	Carrère and Hastings	
68	46,054 sq ft (4,278.6 m^{2})	Greystone Mansion	Beverly Hills, California	Edward L. Doheny	City of Beverly Hills	1928	Tudor Revival	Gordon Kaufmann	
69	46,000 sq ft (4,300 m^{2})	Elstowe Manor	Elkins Park, Pennsylvania	William L. Elkins	Landmark Venues	1898	Italian Renaissance	Horace Trumbauer	
70	45,891 sq ft (4,263.4 m^{2})	457 Bel Air Road	Los Angeles, California	Beny Alagem		2006	French Normandy	Robert A.M. Stern	
71	45,854 sq ft (4,260.0 m^{2})	Villa Collina	Moorestown, New Jersey	Vernon Hill		2002	Italian Renaissance		
72	45,843 sq ft (4,259.0 m^{2})	Townsend House	Washington, D.C.	Richard T. Townsend	Cosmos Club	1901	Beaux-Arts	Carrère and Hastings	
73 (tie)	45,000 sq ft (4,200 m^{2})	Illinois Executive Mansion	Springfield, Illinois	State of Illinois		1855	Georgian Revival	John M. Van Osdel	
73 (tie)	45,000 sq ft (4,200 m^{2})	Darlington	Mahwah, New Jersey	George Crocker	Jaime Garrido	1907	Jacobean	James Brite	
73 (tie)	45,000 sq ft (4,200 m^{2})	Henry Clay Frick House	New York, New York	Henry Clay Frick	Frick Collection	1914	Beaux-Arts	Carrère and Hastings	
77	44,936 sq ft (4,174.7 m^{2})	Anderson House	Washington, D.C.	Larz Anderson	Society of the Cincinnati	1905	Beaux-Arts	Arthur Little; Herbert Browne	
78	44,309 sq ft (4,116.4 m^{2})	Glencairn	Bryn Athyn, Pennsylvania	Raymond Pitcairn	The New Church	1938	Romanesque	Raymond Pitcairn	
79	44,234 sq ft (4,109.5 m^{2})	Villa Vittoriosa	Fayetteville, Georgia	Evander Holyfield	Rick Ross	1994	Neoclassical	Portman Fuchtman Vinson Sunderland	
80	44,229 sq ft (4,109.0 m^{2})	Ochre Court	Newport, Rhode Island	Ogden Goelet	Salve Regina University	1892	Châteauesque	Richard Morris Hunt	
81 (tie)	44,000 sq ft (4,100 m^{2})	Hyde Park	Hyde Park, New York	Frederick Vanderbilt	Federal government	1899	Beaux-Arts	Charles Follen McKim	
81 (tie)	44,000 sq ft (4,100 m^{2})	901 Trophy Hills Drive	Las Vegas, Nevada	Sheldon Adelson		2013			
83	43,793 sq ft (4,068.5 m^{2})	Boldt Castle	Alexandria Bay, New York	George Boldt	Thousand Islands Bridge Authority	1904	Chateauesque	G.W. & W.D. Hewitt	
84	43,772 sq ft (4,066.6 m^{2})	Seaview Terrace	Newport, Rhode Island	Edson Bradley	Martin Carey	1925	Chateauesque	Howard Greenley	
85	43,561 sq ft (4,046.9 m^{2})	Marland Mansion	Ponca City, Oklahoma	Ernest Whitworth Marland	City of Ponca City	1928	Mediterranean Revival	John Duncan Forsyth	
86	43,515 sq ft (4,042.7 m^{2})	Asherwood	Carmel, Indiana	Melvin Simon	YMP, Rev Lvg Trust	1999	Chateauesque		
87	43,040 sq ft (3,999 m^{2})	Primatara	Springfield, Missouri	Robert Low	Robert Low	(under construction)		Richard Drummond Davis	
88	42,831 sq ft (3,979.1 m^{2})	Château des Fleurs	Los Angeles, California	James A. Kaplan		2014	Chateauesque	William Hefner	
89	42,014 sq ft (3,903.2 m^{2})	51 Winding Brook Drive	Saratoga Springs, New York	John Breyo		2006	Mediterranean Revival	Robert Flansburg	
90 (tie)	42,000 sq ft (3,900 m^{2})	Payne Mansion	Esopus, New York	Oliver Hazard Payne	Marist University	1911	Beaux-Arts	Carrère and Hastings	
90 (tie)	~42,000 sq ft (3,900 m^{2}) (Note: At the time of original construction it was between 37,000 sq ft (3,400 m^{2}) and 42,500 sq ft (3,950 m^{2}). Various sources state that it is currently 62,500 sq ft (5,810 m^{2}) with the addition of a 20,000 sq ft (1,900 m^{2}) ballroom by Donald J. Trump in 2005. Since this large addition was made after the home was converted into a club in 1995, the additional space from the ballroom is not calculated into the ranking of largest houses. See: "The opulent history of Mar-a-Lago". NPR. 8 September 2022. and "History - The Mar-a-Lago Club". The Mar-a-Lago Club.)	Mar-a-Lago	Palm Beach, Florida	Marjorie Merriweather Post	Donald Trump	1927	Mediterranean Revival architecture	Marion Sims Wyeth (exterior) Joseph Urban (interior)	
90 (tie)	42,000 sq ft (3,900 m^{2})	Rose Terrace	Grosse Pointe Farms, Michigan	Anna Thompson Dodge	(demolished in 1976)	1931	Neoclassical	Horace Trumbauer	
93	41,774 sq ft (3,880.9 m^{2})	Le Palais Royal	Hillsboro Beach, Florida	Robert Pereira		2014	Beaux-Arts	Denio Madera	
94	41,050 sq ft (3,814 m^{2})	Carolands	Hillsborough, California	Harriet Pullman Carolan	Charles Bartlett Johnson	1914	Second Empire	Ernest Sanson; Willis Polk	
94 (tie)	41,000 sq ft (3,800 m^{2})	Hayes Mansion	San Jose, California	Mary Hayes Chynoweth	JMA Ventures	1905	Mediterranean Revival	George Page	
94 (tie)	41,000 sq ft (3,800 m^{2})	NYIT de Seversky Mansion	Old Westbury, New York	Alfred I. du Pont	New York Institute of Technology	1918	Georgian Revival	Carrère and Hastings	
97	40,916 sq ft (3,801.2 m^{2})	Il Palmetto	Palm Beach, Florida	Joseph E. Widener	James H. Clark	1927	Mediterranean Revival	Maurice Fatio	
98	40,280 sq ft (3,742 m^{2})	Walker McCune Mansion	Paradise Valley, Arizona	Walker McCune	George A. Hormel family	1962	Contemporary		
99 (tie)	40,000 sq ft (3,700 m^{2})	Mills Mansion	Hyde Park, New York	Ogden Mills	New York State Office of Parks, Recreation and Historic Preservation	1896	Beaux-Arts	Stanford White	
99 (tie)	40,000 sq ft (3,700 m^{2})	The Braes	Glen Cove, New York	Herbert L. Pratt	Webb Institute	1912	Jacobean	James Brite	
99 (tie)	40,000 sq ft (3,700 m^{2})	Coe Hall	Upper Brookville, New York	William Robertson Coe	Planting Fields Foundation	1921	Tudor Revival	Guy Lowell	
99 (tie)	40,000 sq ft (3,700 m^{2})	Rynwood	Old Brookville, New York	Samuel Agar Salvage	John Mariani Jr, Banfi Vintners	1927	Tudor Revival	Roger Bullard	
99 (tie)	40,000 sq ft (3,700 m^{2})	10697 Somma Way	Los Angeles, California	Ty Cueva		2017	Spanish Colonial Revival		

== Single largest per state and territory ==
Houses with area less than 40,000 square feet (3,700 m^{2}) have area listed here rather than above.

- DC: White House
- Alabama: Chateau Montagel
- Alaska: 2100 Atwood Drive, 9,748 square feet (905.6 m^{2})
- Arizona: Walker McCune Mansion
- Arkansas: 3304 Lacoste Dr, 20,928 square feet (1,944.3 m^{2})
- California: The One
- Colorado: Hala Ranch
- Connecticut: Chase Mansion
- Delaware: Winterthur Museum and Country Estate
- Florida: Versailles house
- Georgia: Villa Vittoriosa
- Hawaii: 4262A Anini Vista Drive, 11,159 square feet (1,036.7 m^{2})
- Idaho: White Horse Ranch Estate, 30,000 square feet (2,800 m^{2})
- Illinois: Illinois Executive Mansion
- Indiana: Asherwood
- Iowa: 13286 Northeast 56th Street, 10,666 square feet (990.9 m^{2})
- Kansas: Spirit of Avalon, 18,000 square feet (1,700 m^{2})
- Kentucky: Delong Manor, 24,252 square feet (2,253.1 m^{2})
- Louisiana: Nottoway Plantation
- Maine: 459 Bluff Road, 20,000 square feet (1,900 m^{2})
- Maryland: 10423 Willowbrook Drive, 55,000 square feet (5,100 m^{2})
- Massachusetts: Shadow Brook Farm Historic District
- Michigan: Meadow Brook Hall
- Minnesota: James J. Hill House, 36,000 square feet (3,300 m^{2})
- Mississippi: Nutt's Folly
- Missouri: Pensmore
- Montana: 5650 Canyonwoods Drive, 30,000 square feet (2,800 m^{2})
- Nebraska: Pittock Mansion, 23,188 square feet (2,154.2 m^{2})
- Nevada: 1299 Via Tivoli
- New Hampshire: Longview Estate, 63,000 square feet (5,900 m^{2})
- New Jersey: Shadow Lawn
- New Mexico: 340 Rancho San Rafael, 20,000 square feet (1,900 m^{2})
- New York: Oheka Castle
- North Carolina: Biltmore Estate
- North Dakota: 2043 Rose Creek Boulevard South, 18,000 square feet (1,700 m^{2})
- Ohio: Stan Hywet Hall and Gardens
- Oklahoma: E. W. Marland Mansion
- Oregon: 32088 SW Peach Cove Road
- Pennsylvania: Lynnewood Hall
- Rhode Island: Belton Court
- South Carolina: Williams Mansion, 24,000 square feet (2,200 m^{2})
- South Dakota: South Dakota Governor's Residence, 14,000 square feet (1,300 m^{2})
- Tennessee: Villa Collina, 40,250 square feet (3,739 m^{2})
- Texas: Lutcher Brown Estate
- Utah: 8271 E Left Hand Fork Hobble Creek
- Vermont: 506 North Hill Road, 18,055 square feet (1,677.4 m^{2})
- Virginia: 700 Bulls Neck Road, 33,000 square feet (3,100 m^{2})
- Washington: Bill Gates's house
- West Virginia: Claymont Court, 16,000 square feet (1,500 m^{2})
- Wisconsin: Ellison Bay Manor, 35,000 square feet (3,300 m^{2})
- Wyoming: McMurry Mansion, 23,000 square feet (2,100 m^{2})
- American Samoa: Government House, 10,670 square feet (991 m^{2})
- Guam: Stone House Mansion, 10,000 square feet (930 m^{2})
- Northern Mariana Islands: Burtin Villa, 5,000 square feet (460 m^{2})
- Puerto Rico: 316 Calle De Diego 102, 17,800 square feet (1,650 m^{2})
- U.S. Virgin Islands: Government House Saint Croix, 17,350 square feet (1,612 m^{2})

== See also ==
- List of Gilded Age mansions
- List of largest houses in the Los Angeles metropolitan area
