= List of Hampden–Sydney College alumni =

Hampden–Sydney College is a men's liberal arts college in Hampden Sydney, Virginia. Individuals are sorted by category and alphabetized within each category. The Alumni Association of Hampden–Sydney College considers all former students members, whether they graduated or not, and does not generally differentiate between graduates and non-graduates when identifying alumni. Currently, Hampden-Sydney has an estimated 8,000 living alumni.

== Arts, media, and entertainment ==
- William H. Armstrong: teacher, author of the Newbery Medal-winning Sounder; Class of 1936
- Stephen Colbert: comedian, host of The Late Show on CBS; studied philosophy for two years before transferring to Northwestern University and graduating in 1986
- Scott Cooper: actor, writer, producer of films, Gods and Generals, Broken Trail; directed and wrote screenplay for the Academy-Award-winning film Crazy Heart; Class of 1992
- Kyle Fraser: winner of Survivor 48
- James B. Hughes: Ohio delegate and militia colonel; founder of three newspapers, including the Minnesota Chronicle, abolitionist
- Charles Hurt: opinion editor for The Washington Times, Fox News contributor, editor of The Drudge Report; Class of 1995
- Michael Knight: author of short stories, novels, and screenplays; winner of the Playboy Fiction Writing Contest; Class of 1992
- Samuel Logan: investigative journalist
- Patrick Luwis: actor, star of Cobra Kai
- Jonathan Martin: national political reporter for The New York Times; Class of 1999
- Thomas B. Mason: U.S. attorney; actor, Mississippi Burning, Crimes of the Heart and Gods and Generals; Class of 1940
- John Phillips: musician, member of The Mamas & the Papas; attended but did not graduate; Class of 1956
- Robert Porterfield: actor (Sergeant York); founder of the Barter Theatre; attended, did not graduate, but received an honorary degree of Doctor of Letters for his work in the theatre in 1948
- William Smithers: actor, TV and film, Dallas, Papillion, Scorpio, Star Trek; attended 1946–1948 before transferring to Catholic University to study acting; Class of 1950
- Chris Stirewalt: former digital politics editor for Fox News Channel; American politics editor for The Dispatch; Class of 1997
- Garnett Smith: actor in Scarface
- Skipp Sudduth: actor, Third Watch, Ronin, Clockers; Class of 1979

== Business ==
- Robert Citrone: billionaire hedge fund manager of Discovery Capital Management; part owner of Pittsburgh Steelers; Class of 1987
- James Cook: senior vice president of the U.S. Russia Investment Fund (TUSRIF) and Delta Capital Management; co-founder of Aurora Russia Limited
- Steven T. Huff: chairman of TF Concrete Forming Systems; owner of Pensmore; Class of 1973
- Maurice Jones: Rhodes Scholar; former deputy secretary of HUD; former secretary of Commerce and Trade for the State of Virginia; Class of 1986
- Camm Morton: real estate developer, investment banker; former president of Western Development, originator of the Mills retail concept; former president of Factory Outlet Stores; co-founder of VR Business Brokers
- William Lawrence Scott: industrialist; president of two railroad companies including the Erie and Pittsburgh Railroad

== Education ==
- Daniel Baker: Presbyterian minister, founder of Austin College; attended 1811–1813
- Willis Henry Bocock: first dean of the University of Georgia Graduate School, 1910–1928; prominent professor of Classics; Class of 1884
- Charles William Dabney: chemist; president of University of Cincinnati (1887–1904) and University of Tennessee (1904–1920); Class of 1873
- George H. Denny: president of Washington and Lee University 1899–1911; president of the University of Alabama 1911–1936, and interim president in 1941; Class of 1891
- Joseph Dupuy Eggleston: president of Virginia Agricultural and Mechanical College and Polytechnic Institute (now Virginia Tech) 1913–1919; president of Hampden Sydney College 1919–1939
- Landon Garland: president of Randolph-Macon College, president of the University of Alabama, and founding chancellor of Vanderbilt University; Class of 1829
- George Wilson McPhail: president of Lafayette College and sixth president of Davidson College
- Walter Stephenson Newman: tenth president of Virginia Tech 1947–1962; one of the co-founders of the Future Farmers of America; president of the National Bank of Blacksburg; Class of 1917
- John Bunyan Shearer: minister; president of Stewart College, building it up as Southwestern Presbyterian University; eighth president of Davidson College; class of 1851
- Paul S. Trible Jr.: president of Christopher Newport University 1996–2022; former U.S. senator and U.S. representative from Virginia; Class of 1968
- Moses Waddel: fifth president of the University of Georgia, 1819–1829; prominent educator of his time (many southern leaders studied under Waddel, including John C. Calhoun); Class of 1791

== Law and politics ==
- George M. Bibb: chief justice of Kentucky; U.S. senator from Kentucky; seventeenth U.S. secretary of the treasury; Class of 1791
- Thomas S. Bocock: speaker of the Confederate House; Class of 1838
- William Henry Brodnax: general of Virginia militia during the Nat Turner's Rebellion; Virginia legislator, class of 1804 or 1805
- William H. Cabell: 14th governor of Virginia; judge on Virginia Supreme Court; Class of 1789
- Dabney Carr: lawyer, author, justice of the Virginia Supreme Court (1824–1837)
- William Crawford: lawyer; U.S. attorney; member of Alabama senate; U.S. district and circuit judge
- James Crowell: former director of the Executive Office of the U. S. Attorneys; current associate judge on the Superior Court of the District of Columbia
- S. Thomas Currin II: judge on the North Carolina Superior Court
- William Daniel: Virginia House of Delegates; judge of the Virginia Supreme Court of Appeals; Class of 1826
- Clement C. Dickinson: Missouri state senator; United States representative from Missouri; class of 1869
- John Wayles Eppes: United States representative and senator; Class of 1786
- John A. Field Jr.: United States federal judge; Class of 1932
- Samuel Lightfoot Flournoy: West Virginia state senator and lawyer; Class of 1868
- Thomas S. Flournoy: United States representative and Confederate cavalry colonel in the Civil War
- Hamilton Rowan Gamble: Missouri state legislator; presiding judge in state supreme court; provisional (Unionist) governor of Missouri
- Hugh A. Garland: lawyer, Virginia and Missouri
- William Branch Giles: member of both houses of Congress; 24th governor of Virginia; Class of 1791
- Henry Bell Gilkeson: West Virginia senator, West Virginia House of Delegates member, and principal of the West Virginia Schools for the Deaf and Blind
- John Gill Jr.: attorney; Maryland state delegate; police commissioner of Baltimore; U.S. representative
- Jim Harrell: North Carolina legislator
- William Henry Harrison: ninth president of the United States; Class of 1791
- Eugene Hickok: U.S. undersecretary of education; acting deputy secretary of education; former secretary of education of Pennsylvania; founding member and former chairman of the Education Leaders Council; Class of 1972
- George Washington Hopkins: United States ambassador to Portugal; speaker of the Virginia House of Delegates; judge; attorney; teacher
- Robert Hurt: former congressman for Virginia's Fifth Congressional District; former member of the Virginia Senate and the Virginia House of Delegates; Class of 1991
- William Giles Jones: attorney; member of Alabama legislature; US district court judge
- Jim Jordan: former campaign manager for presidential candidate John Kerry; Class of 1983
- Monroe Leigh: classicist; attorney; chief legal advisor to the State Department; US member, International Court of Arbitration, the Hague; Class of 1940
- Thomas W. Ligon: Maryland delegate; U.S. representative; 30th governor of Maryland; Class of 1830
- Jonathan Martin: national political correspondent for the New York Times; Class of 1999
- Peter M. McCoy Jr.: former member of South Carolina legislature (2011–2020); former US district attorney; Class of 2001
- Britt McKenzie: member of the Arkansas House of Representatives
- Philip W. McKinney: 41st governor of Virginia, Class of 1851
- Elisha E. Meredith: Virginia state senator; United States representative
- W. Tayloe Murphy Jr. : lawyer, state delegate, Virginia Secretary of Natural Resources 2002–2006; Class of 1953
- Chris Peace: member of the Virginia House of Delegates, 97th District; Class of 1998
- William Ballard Preston: U.S. Secretary of the Navy, 1849–1850; U.S. House of Representatives, 1847–1849, abolitionist; author of the "Preston Resolution", the bill of Virginia's secession; Class of 1824
- Sterling Price: U.S. House of Representatives, 1845–1846; military commander in the Mexican-American War; 11th governor of Missouri, 1853–1857; Confederate general in the Civil War; class of 1830
- Paul Reiber: chief justice of the Vermont State Supreme Court; Class of 1970
- Alexander Rives: judge of the Virginia Supreme Court; judge of the United States District Court for the Western District of Virginia; Class of 1825
- William Cabell Rives: U.S. representative from Virginia; U.S. senator; minister to France; Confederate representative; attended but did not graduate
- William B. Spong Jr.: U.S. senator from Virginia; 17th dean of William and Mary Law School; Class of 1941
- John W. Stevenson: attorney; member of both houses of the US Congress; 25th governor of Kentucky; attended 1828–1830
- Robert Strange: U.S. senator from North Carolina; author of Eoneguski ("the first North Carolina novel"); Class of 1814
- John Leighton Stuart: U.S. ambassador to China, 1946–1949; president, Yenching University, Beijing, 1919–1946; Class of 1896
- Paul S. Trible Jr.: former U.S. senator and U.S. representative from Virginia; current president of Christopher Newport University; Class of 1968
- Lee Trinkle: 49th governor of Virginia 1922–1926; Class of 1896
- Abraham B. Venable: United States representative and senator from Virginia, first president of the First National Bank of Virginia
- Sean D. Wallace, judge, United Nations Dispute Tribunal, judge, Circuit Court of Prince George's County, Maryland
- Wren Williams: current delegate for the 47th district in the Virginia House of Delegates
- James R. Young: first North Carolina insurance commissioner, 1899–1921

== Military ==
- William Madison: Army general, War of 1812; militia man, Hampden-Sidney Boys 1776; brother of President James Madison
- Samuel V. Wilson: "General Sam," served in the U.S. Army (1940–1977, attained rank of lieutenant general), political science professor at H-SC starting in 1977, 22nd president of H-SC (1992–2000), awarded an honorary degree by the H-SC Class of 2000
- John Singleton Mosby (1833–1916), known as the "Gray Ghost," was a renowned Confederate cavalry battalion commander during the American Civil War, celebrated for his guerrilla tactics and ability to elude Union forces. Before his military career, he enrolled at Hampden-Sydney College in 1847, though he did not graduate.

== Religion ==
- Thomas Atkinson: third bishop of the Episcopal Diocese of North Carolina; one of the ten bishops who joined to found the University of the South: Sewanee; founder of Saint Augustine's University; Class of 1825
- Robert Lewis Dabney: theologian; chief of staff for Stonewall Jackson; biographer of Jackson; Confederate Army Chaplain; attended circa 1835–1836, graduated from the University of Virginia
- William Henry Foote: Presbyterian minister and historian; Doctor of Divinity from Hampden–Sydney College in 1847; served on its Board of Trustees 1851–1870
- Robert Atkinson Gibson: sixth bishop of the Episcopal Diocese of Virginia (1902–1919); Class of 1867
- Arthur Heath Light: fourth episcopal bishop of the Diocese of Southwest Virginia; Class of 1951
- Frank Clayton Matthews: bishop for the Office of Pastoral Development for the Episcopal Church, formerly suffragan bishop of the Episcopal Diocese of Virginia; Class of 1970
- William R. Moody: third episcopal bishop of the Diocese of Lexington; founder of the Washington School of Religion; Class of 1922
- Charles Clifton Penick: missionary bishop of the Episcopal Church; Bishop of Cape Palmas, West Africa (1825–1914)
- J. Dwight Pentecost: Christian theologian known for his book Things to Come; Distinguished Professor of Bible Exposition, Emeritus, Dallas Theological Seminary, 1955–2014; Class of 1937
- Francis A. Schaeffer: theologian, philosopher, Presbyterian pastor; known for writings and establishing the L'Abri community in Switzerland; author of A Christian Manifesto; Class of 1935
- Brian Wallace: bishop suffragan of the Anglican Diocese of Churches for the Sake of Others; Class of 1985
- V. Neil Wyrick: pastor, prominent Christian author and actor; Class of 1950

== Science and medicine ==
- W. Randolph Chitwood Jr., MD: pioneered robotic cardiac surgery in the US for minimally invasive heart surgery; Class of 1968
- Hardy Cross: civil engineer; developed the moment distribution method for analysing indeterminate motion in buildings; Class of 1902
- John Peter Mettauer: first plastic surgeon in the US; Class of 1807
- Thomas Dent Mütter, MD: innovative surgeon; medical professor; benefactor of Philadelphia tourist attraction Mütter Museum; Class of 1830

== Sports ==
- Griff Aldrich: head men's basketball coach, Pepperdine University; Class of 1996
- Bob Humphreys: professional baseball player; played in 1964 World Series; Class of 1958
- Tom Miller: NFL player; assistant GM of Green Bay Packers; member of Packers' Hall of Fame; Class of 1943
- Ryan Odom: head men's basketball coach, University of Virginia; Class of 1996
- Ryan Silverfield: head football coach, University of Arkansas; Class of 2003
- Russell D. Turner: men's basketball head coach of UC Irvine; former assistant coach of the Golden State Warriors; Class of 1992
- Stu Worden: American football player
