= Concierge Auctions =

American residential real estate company

- Industry: Real estate
- Founded: 2008; 18 years ago
- Headquarters: United States
- Key people: Laura Brady, CEO; Chad Roffers, President
- Website: www.casothebys.com

Concierge Auctions is a residential real estate company based in New York and Texas. It auctions properties to the highest bidder.

In November 2021, Concierge Auctions was acquired by Sotheby's and Realogy. The company rebranded to Sotheby’s Concierge Auctions. It holds the world record for the most expensive home ever sold in the United States through an auction for The One in L.A., a 120,000 square foot mansion owned by Nile Niami.

It has been on the Inc. 5000 list since 2014. The company has been accused of artificially driving up the price of its auctions since 2014, with many lawsuits settled out of court. Since 2008, the company has sold more than $3 billion in real estate properties in 46 U.S. states or territories and 30 foreign countries.

== History ==
The company was founded in 2008 by Chad Roffers, who had owned Sky Sotheby's International Realty, and Laura Brady, a realtor from Sarasota. It was conceptualized to hold auctions for high-priced real estate between a seller and a group of buyers. Local real estate agents receive 5-6 percent sales commission and Concierge Auctions charges 12 percent to buyers. Auctions range from $2 million to $100 million, but have an average of about $4 million.

Founder of the Corcoran Group and Shark Tank cast member, Barbara Corcoran joined Concierge Auctions as a strategic advisor in 2014. In 2016, LeadingRE and Luxury Portfolio International announced Concierge Auctions as the auction provider and an at-ready source for its members. In 2017, Concierge Auctions sold more than $340 million from 81 sales. Forbes reported that almost 90 percent of its auctions were conducted through a smart phone app that year. In 2018, the company became the "preferred" home auction partner of Engel & Völkers Advisors, North America. It sold $390 million in real estate from 96 separate sales that year.

The company became the "main reference in the Italian market" after partnering with Sotheby's International Realty as its "preferred auction provider". It has worked with Giveback Homes and Habitat for Humanity on its "Key for Key" program, which builds one low-income home for every property sold at auction. By 2020, Concierge Auctions had built more than 200 homes through the program. The company auctioned the largest private island for sale in the Caribbean, Little Ragged Island in March 2021 and in June 2022.

In November 2021, Concierge Auctions was acquired by Sotheby’s and Realogy Holdings Corp. The company operates independently after the acquisition and is rebranded to Sotheby’s Concierge Auctions.

=== Recognition ===
In 2018, the company's $36.2 million sale of a property in Dallas, Texas was the highest price paid for a residential property that went to auction in the United States. One year later, Concierge Auctions broke its own record for the most expensive home ever sold at an auction in the United States: an estate in Florida that sold for $42.5 million. It was the highest-priced home to sell in Broward County's history, according to property records.

The company has also been recognized for its annual Luxury Home Index report, which evaluates average selling prices for homes and the time it takes to sell based on the number of days on the market. In 2021, Concierge Auctions recorded the highest online auction for a single-family home in Beverly Hills owned by Steven F. Udvar-Házy.

Since 2014, Concierge Auctions has been included on the Inc. 5000. As of April 2022, the company holds the world record for the most expensive home sold in the US through an auction for The One in LA which was sold for $141 million to Richard Saghian of Fashion Nova.

== Clients ==
Media outlets reported in 2009 that Cher would be auctioning a house she had built in the Four Seasons Resort Hualalai and chose Concierge Auctions to market the property.

In 2013, Concierge Auctions signed Michael Jordan as a client. Jordan hired the company to auction off his 56,000 square foot home in the Highland Park area of Chicago. The home had 9 bedrooms, 19 bathrooms, a beauty salon, indoor basketball court, gourmet kitchen, stocked fishing pond, and tennis court. The home was originally listed at $29 million. Jordan's business manager and spokesperson, Estee Portnoy, stated that Concierge Auctions "gave great exposure to the property". Two days after the auction produced no bidder offering above the reserve price of $13 million, Jordan put his home back on the conventional real estate market in December 2013 asking for $16 million. As of May 2020, the home is on the market for $14,855,000, the digits of which total 23.

Concierge Auctions conducted the sale of former chairman of Live Nation Entertainment, Michael Cohl's home in Key Biscayne which had a previous listing of $36 million. A beach estate in the south of Spain where Pablo Picasso painted and signed the bottom of a pool in 1961 was also auctioned by the company. It worked with former chief executive officer of Lehman Brothers, Richard S. Fuld Jr. on the sale of his Idaho ranch.

In early 2019, the company signed with the estate of Wayne Huizenga for his home in Fort Lauderdale, Florida and mutual fund manager Peter Lynch for his home in Paradise Valley, Arizona. An online auction for the Greenwich, Connecticut mansion owned by shoe designer Vince Camuto before his death was scheduled by Concierge Auctions for August 2020 after a spike in buyer interest in the area due to the COVID-19 pandemic.

In 2022, the company managed the sale of the penthouse above Tiffany & Co.’s store in Palm Beach, Florida, through an online auction. The company also listed The One for sale at $295 million; it sold at auction for $126 million, plus a 12-percent commission to Concierge Auctions.

== Controversies and criticism ==
In 2013, Grand Estates Auction sued the company along with several past Concierge Auctions' clients in the U.S. District Court for the Southern District of New York for $23 million per claim, alleging multiple claims of false advertising, deceptive trade practices, tortious interference, mail fraud, wire fraud and violations of the Racketeer Influenced and Corrupt Practices Act (RICO Act). According to the suit, North Carolina Auctioneer License Board had issued a warning to Concierge Auctions for false and misleading advertising. Prior to the lawsuit, Concierge Auctions had sued Grand Estates Auction alleging the creation of fake email accounts to publish “false and defamatory” stories about Concierge Auctions online. The Grand Estates Auction lawsuit was dismissed in 2014.

Since 2014, Concierge Auctions has been accused of artificially inflating the price of homes allegedly by using fake bidders. In 2017, two real estate investors sued the company in a California federal court for allegedly keeping a deposit on a home in the country of Fiji. A complaint was also filed by the company’s African-American real estate agent in September 2017 alleging discriminatory practices.
