= The One (Los Angeles) =

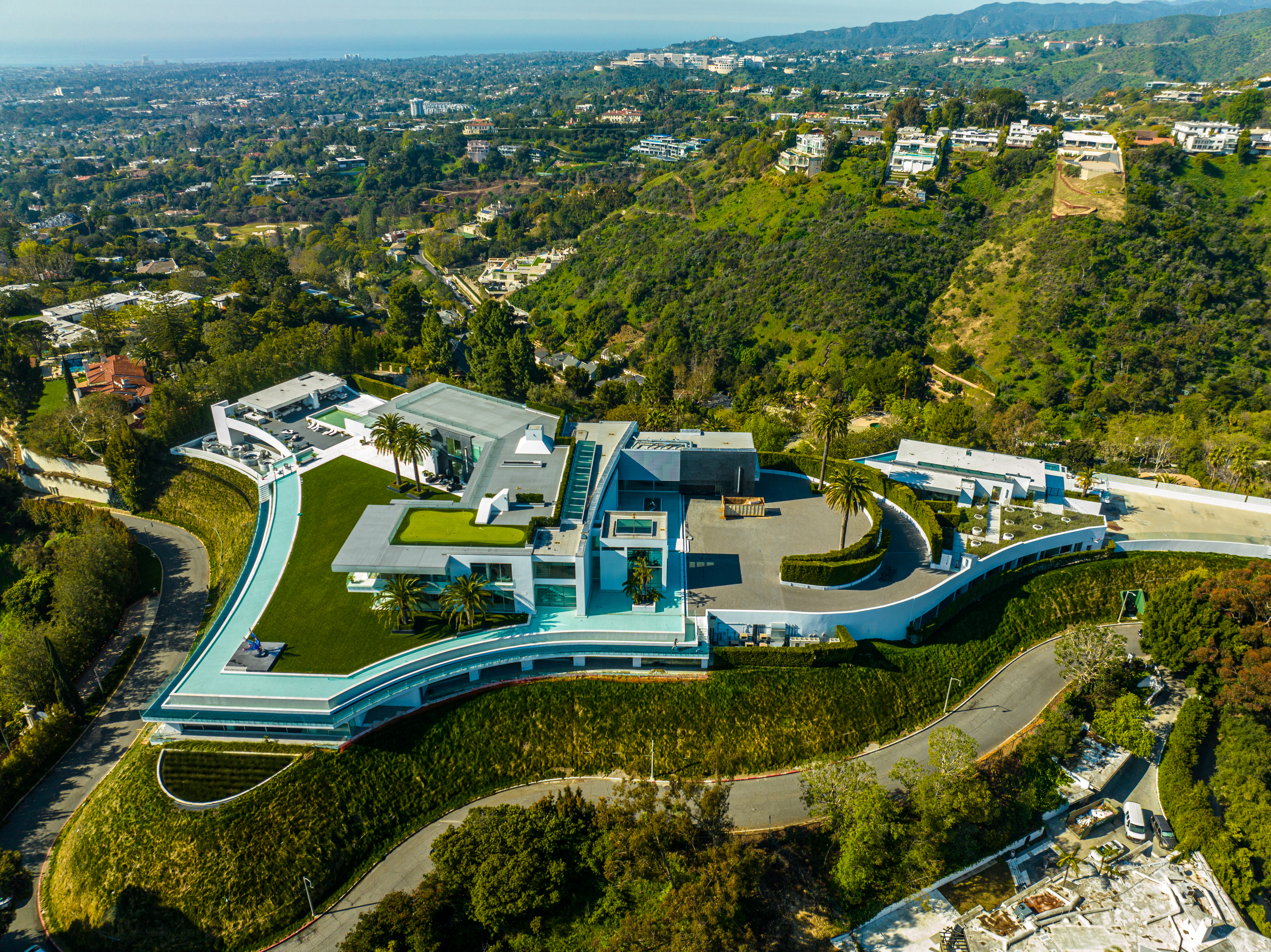
- Aerial view of The One, 2023

General information
- Type: Mansion
- Architectural style: Modernist
- Location: 944 Airole Way; Bel-Air, Los Angeles, California, U.S.
- Coordinates: 34°05′18″N 118°27′06″W
- Construction started: 2014
- Completed: 2021
- Owner: Richard Saghian

Technical details
- Floor area: 105,000 ft^{2} (9,800 m^{2})

Design and construction
- Architect: Paul McClean
- Developer: Nile Niami

The One is a private residence in Bel Air, Los Angeles, California, United States. It is a compound of a main residence and three smaller houses in the modernist style and was developed by Nile Niami. The property is 105,000 square feet (9,800 m^{2}) on 3.8 acres (1.5 ha).

Construction began in 2014. Following delays, it was completed in 2021. Niami initially sought to sell the mansion for $500 million, but his company fell into bankruptcy and the building sold at auction for $126 million, a record auction sale price in the United States.

== History of the site ==
The first house on the site was constructed in 1946 for Justin Whitlock Dart Sr. and was named "Winds Aloft." The architect was Albert Frederick Roller (1891–1981). The same year, Roller designed the world headquarters at Beverly and La Cienega for the Rexall Drug Company, of which Dart was chairman. The house was destroyed in November 1961 in the Bel Air Fire. A month after the fire, the Darts commissioned A. Quincy Jones to design a new home for the property. However, instead of executing the Jones design, in 1962 the Darts purchased 444 North Faring Road and had Jones design an addition to this house.

In 1966, 944 Airole was listed for sale as a vacant lot save for the tennis court, which survived the fire. The property was purchased by Alfred E. Mann, who in 1967 commissioned a new house designed by Gilbert Alvin Griffin (1919–1990) and Glenn M. Krebs. The home was completed in 1969. This house appeared in four episodes of The Rockford Files, four episodes of Cannon, and two episodes of Columbo.

== Design and construction ==
Nile Niami purchased the 3.8-acre (1.5 ha) lot on a hilltop in Bel Air, Los Angeles, for $28 million in 2012. The plot has a 360-degree view of the Pacific Ocean, Downtown Los Angeles, and the San Gabriel Mountains. The property had a 10,000-square-foot (930 m^{2}) house, which Niami demolished. Construction began in 2014. Workers removed 49,000 cubic yards (37,000 m^{3}) of dirt from the property in 5,000 truckloads, a process which took two years to complete. Residents of Bel-Air who opposed the project formed a homeowners alliance, which was led by Fred Rosen, the former chief executive officer (CEO) of Ticketmaster, who insisted that it should be permitted as a commercial development. In December 2016, the Los Angeles City Council approved rewriting city ordinances to more strictly regulate the size of new homes being built in single-family neighborhoods and areas with hills. Niami intended to have The One completed by 2018, but the construction experienced delays and it was not completed until 2021.

The One was designed by Niami and Paul McClean, who was also the architect, and Kathryn Rotondi, the interior designer. Niami named it "The One", as Niami insists that there is no house like it, and said that he wanted to list it for sale at $500 million. The One is a private residence designed with modernist architecture. The property is a total of 105,000 square feet (9,800 m^{2}), including a 74,000-square-foot (6,900 m^{2}) main residence and three smaller guest houses. The One has 21 bedrooms and 42 bathrooms, with a 5,500-square-foot (510 m^{2}) primary suite. The One also has a 10,000-square-foot (930 m^{2}) skydeck, putting green, a 30-car garage with two display car turntables, four-lane bowling alley, movie theater, nightclub, hair salon, a "philanthropy wing" designed to host charity galas with up to 200 guests, and a "Monaco-style" casino. The property has a 400-foot (120 m) jogging track and five swimming pools, including a moat with an infinity edge. Fortune estimated the mansion would require 50 HVAC systems and cost $50,000 a month in electricity costs to cool during the summer. The One contains custom art pieces made by Niclas Castello, Mike Fields, Stephen Wilson, and Simone Cenedese.

Reception to the home's design was mixed, with the Los Angeles Times writing, "Some think it's the ultimate trophy home, others are convinced it's a giant white elephant clad in marble and glass that one local broker has sarcastically dubbed '100,000 square feet of drywall.'"

== Financial troubles and sale ==
Niami acknowledged that he had to halt construction at times due to a lack of financing. Niami borrowed $82.5 million from Don Hankey's investment fund, Hankey Capital, in 2018. The debt grew to over $110 million by March 2021, when Hankey served Niami with a notice of default, giving Niami 90 days to repay the debt. Crestlloyd, Niami's limited liability company, defaulted on a total of $165 million of debt stemming from the property in March 2021. Crestlloyd went into bankruptcy under Chapter 11 in an attempt to prevent The One from falling into foreclosure, but the Los Angeles County Superior Court put the property into receivership in July. Niami sought to create a cryptocurrency called The One Coin that would be backed by the house to raise funds to pay off the debt, but the plan did not succeed.

Concierge Auctions listed the compound for sale at $295 million in January 2022. It did not receive an offer and went to a bankruptcy auction in March 2022, where it sold to Richard Saghian, the CEO of Fashion Nova, for $126 million plus a 12 percent commission to the Concierge Auctions that raised his total investment to $141 million. The sale set the record for the largest property sale at auction in the United States, topping the Hearst Estate in Beverly Hills, which sold for $63.1 million in 2021. The house lacked a certificate of occupancy and required an estimated $20 million in additional construction costs at the time of the sale.

Niami attempted to contest the sale, looking to raise $250 million from investors before the sale could be approved by the bankruptcy court, while other creditors objected to the sale because of the lower than expected price. However, a judge approved the sale. Creditors filed lawsuits over the proceeds of the sale.

== In popular culture ==
Loot, an Apple TV+ series, was filmed at The One in 2021.

== See also ==
- List of largest houses in the Los Angeles metropolitan area
- List of largest houses in the United States
