= List of largest houses in the Los Angeles metropolitan area =

This List of largest houses in the Los Angeles metropolitan area includes 17 single-family residences that are known to equal or exceed 30,000 square feet (2,800 m^{2}) of livable space within the main house. The official square footage of the largest houses in Los Angeles and the Los Angeles metropolitan area excludes ancillary buildings such as guest quarters and pool houses.

== Proximity ==
16 of the 17 houses lie within the Platinum Triangle, including four in Holmby Hills and five in Beverly Hills. Another seven of these houses are situated in Bel Air within a 1,000-foot (300 m) radius.

== Largest houses by floor space ==
Rank	Square footage (Square meterage)	Name	Acreage (Hectarage)	Address	Neighborhood	Private owner (birthplace)	Year completed	Bedrooms	Bathrooms	Est. last sale price	Est. price/sq.ft. (Est. price/sq.m.)	References
1	105,000 square feet (9,800 m^{2})	The One	3.83 acres (1.55 ha)	944 Airole Way	Bel Air	Richard Saghian	2020	20	30	$126,000,000 (2022)	-	
2	55,005 square feet (5,110.1 m^{2})	The Manor at Holmby Hills	4.7 acres (1.9 ha)	594 South Mapleton Drive	Holmby Hills	Eric Schmidt	1990	14	29	$110,000,000 (2025)	-	
3	51,000 square feet (4,700 m^{2})	Hacienda De La Paz	7.27 acres (2.94 ha)	1 Buggy Whip Drive	Rolling Hills	John Brady (Bosnia and Herzegovina)	2008	9	25	$2,050,000 (1993) (lot only)	-	
4	49,300 square feet (4,580 m^{2})	The Pritzker Estate	3.11 acres (1.26 ha)	1261 Angelo Drive	Los Angeles	Anthony Pritzker (United States)	2012	16	27	$14,700,147 (2005) (previous home on lot)	-	
5	46,054 square feet (4,278.6 m^{2})	Greystone Mansion	18.3 acres (7.4 ha)	905 Loma Vista Dr.	Beverly Hills	Doheny Estate (United States)	1928	16	11 Full, 2 Half	$180,000,000 (2021)	$3,908 ($42,988)	
6	45,891 square feet (4,263.4 m^{2})	457 Bel Air Road	4.01 acres (1.62 ha)	457 Bel Air Road	Bel Air	Beny Alagem (Israel)	2006	6	10	$870,008 (2002) (lot only)	-	
7	44,925 square feet (4,173.7 m^{2})	Le Palais	0.98 acres (0.40 ha)	904 North Crescent Drive	Beverly Hills	Lola Karimova-Tillyaeva (Uzbekistan)	2012	7	11	$5,000,000 (2013)	$111 ($1,221)	
8	42,877 square feet (3,983.4 m^{2})	Fleur de Lys	4.19 acres (1.70 ha)	350 North Carolwood Drive	Holmby Hills	Magnus Aakvaag (Norway)	2002	12	18	$88,300,000 (2011)	$2,059 ($22,649)	
9	42,831 square feet (3,979.1 m^{2})	Château des Fleurs	1.94 acres (0.79 ha)	620 Stone Canyon Road	Bel Air	Jeffrey A. Kaplan (United States)	2014	5	6	$2,992,000 (1998) (previous home on lot)	-	
10	38,000 square feet (3,500 m^{2})	Billionaire	1.08 acres (0.44 ha)	924 Bel Air Road	Bel Air	Bruce Makowsky (United States)	2017	12	21	$94,000,000 (2019)	-	
11	35,796 square feet (3,325.6 m^{2})	1156 Shadow Hill Way	2.32 acres (0.94 ha)	1156 Shadow Hill Way	Beverly Hills	Daniel Mani (Egypt)	1991	8	11	$5,000,000 (2006)	$140 ($1,540)	
12	35,378 square feet (3,286.7 m^{2})	Le Belvédère	2.2 acres (0.89 ha)	630 Nîmes Road	Bel Air	Mohamed Hadid (Palestine)	2007	10	14	$50,000,000 (2010)	$1,413 ($15,543)	
13	33,652 square feet (3,126.4 m^{2})	530 S Mapleton Drive	1.29 acres (0.52 ha)	530 S Mapleton Drive	Holmby Hills	-	2017	11	21	$14,400,000 (2011)	$428 ($4,708)	
14	32,000 square feet (3,000 m^{2})	White Family Mansion	1.03 acres (0.4 ha)	10979 Chalon Road	Bel Air	Danny White (United States)	2018	12	25	-	-	
15	31,335 square feet (2,911.1 m^{2})	49 Beverly Park Circle	2.19 acres (0.89 ha)	49 Beverly Park Circle	Beverly Hills	Alec Gores (Israel)	2007	11	21	-	-	
16	30,000 square feet (2,800 m^{2})	The Disney Estate	2.17 acres (0.88 ha)	355 N Carolwood Dr	Holmby Hills	Tom Gores (Israel)	2016	10	20	$13,250,000 (2014) (previous home on lot)	-	
17	30,000 square feet (2,800 m^{2})	454 Cuesta Way	1.88 acres (0.76 ha)	454 Cuesta Way	Bel Air	Jay-Z and Beyoncé (United States)	2017	8	11	$88,000,000 (2017)	$2,933 ($32,263)	

== See also ==
- List of largest houses in the United States
- List of Gilded Age mansions
