= Don Hankey =

American billionaire car loan businessman

- Born: Don Robert Hankey; June 13, 1943 (age 83); Los Angeles, California, U.S.
- Education: University of Southern California
- Occupations: Founder, Hankey Group
- Spouse: Married
- Children: 4

Don Robert Hankey (born June 13, 1943) is an American billionaire and founder of the Hankey Group, which makes most of its income from car loans and the insurance industry. He has been called the "king of the subprime car loan".

== Early life ==
Don Robert Hankey was born on June 13, 1943, in Los Angeles, California, the son of a Los Angeles car dealer. He has a degree from University of Southern California.

== Career ==
Hankey took over his father's Ford dealership in 1972, and built the Hankey Group, with its main business being Westlake Financial Services, which makes subprime car loans at high interest. The company was reported to repossess about 250 cars a day in 2015.

In October 2015, Westlake Financial was ordered by the Consumer Financial Protection Bureau to provide $44.1 million in consumer relief for engaging in illegal debt collection practices. Westlake Financial and its affiliate Wilshire Consumer Credit deceived borrowers into thinking they were being called by repossession companies, other third parties, or even the borrowers’ own family and friends. The Bureau also found that the companies unlawfully disclosed information about borrowers’ debts to employers, family, and friends. The companies also failed to disclose the annual percentage rate on certain loans as required by law. In some cases, the companies changed the due dates or extended the terms of loans without borrowers’ permission, causing more interest to accrue, while telling consumers that the extensions would have a positive effect. These practices violated the Fair Debt Collection Practices Act, the Truth in Lending Act, and the Dodd-Frank Wall Street Reform and Consumer Financial Protection Act.

Hankey’s shell company, Hankey Capital, lent Nile Niami $82.5 million for construction of The One in 2018. Hankey is also a real estate investor in Downtown Los Angeles. Sister company Hankey Investment Company owns over a million square feet of commercial property and 500,000 square feet of urban development land in Southern California. In November 2024, Hankey beat a labor union appeal made by Supporters Alliance for Environmental Responsibility, which called for a halt to the building of a 163-unit apartment complex in the Los Angeles Koreatown area, arguing that the project should face more scrutiny under the California Environmental Quality Act.

In September 2022, Westlake Financial agreed to pay more than $225,000 to resolve allegations that it violated the Servicemembers Civil Relief Act (SCRA) by failing to provide qualified servicemembers with interest rate benefits for the entire period required under the SCRA and by improperly delaying approval of interest rate benefit requests.

Don Hankey has donated to the Republican National Committee, such as his $33,400 donation in August 2016 while acting Chairman of NOWCOM, and a $1,590 donation to the Republican Party of Wyoming PAC during the same month.

Hankey is the largest individual shareholder of Axos Financial, the company that refinanced former U.S. president Donald Trump's mortgages on Trump Tower in New York City and on Trump National Doral in Miami in 2022. He owns Knight Insurance Group and is chairman of Knight Specialty Insurance Company, which issued the $175 million bond Donald Trump posted in April 2024 to stay enforcement of a judgment for $464 million plus interest while he appeals it in a civil fraud case.

As of April 2024 he was reported to have a net worth of US$7.4 billion.

== Personal life ==
Hankey is married with four children and resides in Malibu, California. In April 2020, his son, Don Hankey Jr., was named as a defendant in a civil lawsuit involving allegations including sex trafficking and sexual assault. The case was dismissed in 2024 without any settlement paid. Court records show that a judgment was entered in Hankey Jr.’s favor on several counterclaims, including civil extortion and defamation.
