= Hacienda de la Paz =

Estate in Los Angeles, California, United States

- Interactive map of the Hacienda de la Paz area

General information
- Type: House
- Location: 1 Buggy Whip Drive; Rolling Hills, California, 90274
- Coordinates: 33.760419°N 118.356906°W
- Construction started: 1991 to 1993
- Completed: 2008
- Governing body: Private

Technical details
- Floor area: 51,000 square feet (4,700 m^{2})

Hacienda de la Paz is a large estate property in the city of Rolling Hills, on the Palos Verdes Peninsula in the Los Angeles area of Southern California. It was designed by the 2010 Driehaus Prize winner Rafael Manzano Martos with decorator Manuel Gavira Sanjuan for owner/builder John Z. Blazevich and is Martos' only project in the Americas. Construction began with two parcels of land in 1993 and final completion was not until 2008. It is the 36th largest home ever built in the United States, still standing.

== Price ==
The house was listed for sale in June 2013 for US$53 million and was on the front page of the Los Angeles Times. At the time the property was listed for sale, it was the sixth most expensive home being promoted by the Multiple Listing Service in the United States according to Realtor.com.

== Specifications ==
- The property contains approximately 51,000 square feet (4,700 m^{2}) of living space.
- 5 subterranean floors.
- An indoor tennis court (built to U.S. Open specifications) as well as an outdoor red clay tennis court built to French Open specifications.
- 9 bedrooms and 25 bathrooms.
- Over half the living space is above ground. The 5 subterranean floors are primarily used for entertainment. The indoor tennis court is located at a large ballroom.

== See also ==
- List of largest houses in the Los Angeles Metropolitan Area
- List of largest houses in the United States
