= The Glass Bottom Boat =

1966 American romantic comedy movie directed by Frank Tashlin

- Theatrical release poster
- Directed by: Frank Tashlin
- Written by: Everett Freeman
- Produced by: Martin Melcher; Everett Freeman
- Starring: Doris Day; Rod Taylor; Arthur Godfrey; John McGiver; Paul Lynde; Edward Andrews; Eric Fleming; Dom DeLuise; Dick Martin
- Cinematography: Leon Shamroy
- Edited by: John McSweeney Jr.
- Music by: Frank De Vol
- Distributed by: Metro-Goldwyn-Mayer
- Release date: June 9, 1966
- Running time: 110 minutes
- Country: United States
- Language: English
- Box office: $9.2 million

The Glass Bottom Boat is a 1966 American romantic spy comedy film directed by Frank Tashlin and starring Doris Day, Rod Taylor, and Arthur Godfrey, with John McGiver, Paul Lynde, Edward Andrews, Eric Fleming, Dom DeLuise, and Dick Martin. It is also known as The Spy in Lace Panties.

== Plot ==
Axel Nordstrom manages a glass-bottom boat tourist operation on Santa Catalina Island, California. His widowed daughter, Jennifer Nelson, helps by donning a mermaid costume and swimming underneath his boat for the passengers' amusement.

Jennifer meets Bruce Templeton when his fishing hook accidentally snags her costume. He reels in the bottom half, leaving Jennifer floating in the water bottomless. She later has a run-in with Bruce at her new place of employment, an aerospace research company in Long Beach, where she works in public relations.

Bruce's company created GISMO ("Gravity Inertial Stabilized Manned Observatory"), a gravitation control device which the U.S. Air Force plans to put into orbit in weeks and whose secret formula is sought after by the Soviet Union. Bruce hires Jennifer to write his biography, while he works on GISMO. At his home, she meets electronics technician Julius Pritter and Edgar Hill, a CIA agent ensuring the GISMO project is securely handled. When left alone in a room, Julius starts searching for information regarding GISMO. He photographs a cryptic note written by Bruce while brainstorming ideas about how to win Jennifer's affection. Julius transfers the photos to his handler.

Bruce drives Jennifer to Catalina. His remote-controlled boat malfunctions, throwing Bruce out and landing in a parking lot with Jennifer. Bruce and Jennifer later spend an evening with Axel and his wife.

Bruce is summoned to a meeting with Hill, security guard Homer Cripps, and PR executive Zack Molloy. Hill reveals that secret information is leaking, such as the note that Julius photographed. Cripps is suspicious of Jennifer because of things he noticed about her: She repeatedly calls the same number every day, counts the rings, and then hangs up with the words "that's all for now, Vladimir"; she burns papers alone at night in the office; and she has a shortwave antenna installed in her home. There are innocent explanations for all of these things, which none of the people there know about: Vladimir is her dog, who gets his exercise by running through the house barking whenever he hears the phone ring; Jennifer read a note in the office explaining that old documents should be burned so that they cannot be stolen; and she uses her shortwave antenna to communicate with Axel. Bruce begins to suspect that Jennifer is a spy. Air Force General Wallace Bleecker later arrives to watch over the GISMO project.

Julius is confronted by his handler for only providing useless or publicly known information and is pressured into spying at a party which Bruce will host the next day. Cripps, meanwhile, spies on Jennifer, overhearing her talking to Axel and misunderstanding her end of the conversation as further proof of her involvement in espionage.

At the party, Jennifer declares her love for Bruce. They plan to spend the night together, but Bruce is again called away to a meeting with Hill, Cripps, Molloy, and Bleecker. While picking up the phone to call Vladimir again, she overhears their discussion and learns that they suspect her of wrongdoing. Bruce defends her and believes in her innocence, remarking that she is not intelligent enough to be a spy. Furious, Jennifer starts pretending to be a spy. She arranges for Molloy and Bleecker to have an embarrassing tête-à-tête by promising to meet both at the same time in the guest room. She ties up Cripps, when she sees him tailing her. After noticing Jennifer's deeds, Bruce becomes angry and locks her up in the closet. She is freed by a hidden Hill, who actually is a spy. He stole the formula and placed it in Jennifer's purse to smuggle it out of the house.

Returning home, Jennifer is confronted by Julius. Hill then arrives, draws a gun, and demands the formula. Julius and Jennifer fight him off, and she flees while Bruce, Cripps, Bleecker, and Molloy, who realized the truth, race to save her. Hill is stopped by a blow with a bedside lamp by neighbor Mabel Fenimore. Jennifer and Bruce later have a honeymoon and ride the boat, which again malfunctions and leaves them in the parking lot on Catalina.

== Cast ==
- Doris Day as Jennifer Nelson
- Rod Taylor as Bruce Templeton
- Arthur Godfrey as Axel Nordstrom
- John McGiver as Ralph Goodwin
- Paul Lynde as Homer Cripps
- Edward Andrews as Gen. Wallace Bleecker
- Eric Fleming as Edgar Hill
- Dom DeLuise as Julius Pritter
- Elisabeth Fraser as Nina Bailey
- Dick Martin as Zack Molloy
- George Tobias as Norman Fenimore
- Alice Pearce as Mabel Fenimore
- Ellen Corby as Anna Miller
- Dee J. Thompson as Donna

Pearce and Tobias play an inquisitive wife and her disinterested husband, in roles not unlike the ones they played at the time in the television series Bewitched. The film was also released three months after Pearce's death.

Robert Vaughn, famous at the time for playing Napoleon Solo in the TV series The Man from U.N.C.L.E., makes a very brief non-speaking appearance as a sight gag; the theme from his TV series is heard when he is seen onscreen.

== Production ==
Shooting partly took place on Catalina Island from September 13 to 19, 1965. It was Rod Taylor's second film with Doris Day following Do Not Disturb.

The Nautilus boat used in the film sank in the Catalina harbor in 2008. It is currently drydocked in a private part of the island.

The mermaid costume worn by Doris Day in the opening scene is now on display at the Catalina Casino and can be viewed on the Casino tour.

The film stands apart from Day's other 1960s comedies due to animator-turned-director Tashlin's signature penchant for elaborate, cartoon-like gags and humor. This includes Taylor's futuristic robotic kitchen; a chase scene involving a runaway remote-controlled speedboat; Day accidentally falling into a zero-gravity chamber; and a slapstick sequence involving DeLuise as an inept electrician, which closely resembles Tashlin's frequent collaborations with Jerry Lewis.

== Music ==
The film's score was composed by Frank DeVol and includes selections from Beethoven's "Symphony No. 5 in C minor", Mendelssohn's "Wedding March in C major", "Aloha 'Oe" (written by Queen Liliuokalani), and Goldsmith's "Theme from The Man from U.N.C.L.E.".

Day sings a shortened version of "Soft as the Starlight" (written by Joe Lubin and Jerome Howard), which she previously sang in its entirety on the 1957 album Day by Night. The song "The Glass Bottom Boat" is a rearrangement of "Soft as the Starlight" with completely different lyrics and is heard twice in the film: once over the opening credits, sung by Day; and again as source music sung by Day, Taylor, Godfrey, and Fraser.

Day also sings a single verse from her signature song, "Whatever Will Be, Will Be (Que Sera, Sera)" (written by Jay Livingston and Ray Evans). Dick Martin sings a brief a cappella rendition of "Be My Love" (written by Sammy Cahn and Nicholas Brodszky).

== Reception ==
The film was an attempt to appeal both to Day's traditional fans and to a younger audience. It was a success financially, earning $4,320,000 in North American rentals by the end of 1966.

It drew 21,752 admissions in France.

In his June 10, 1966 review in The New York Times, Vincent Canby laid the blame at the feet of Tashlin: “… one of the few Hollywood directors to pursue the slapstick muse, (he) may some day make a really funny film, full of outrageous sight gags, mistaken identities and lunatic chases. In the meantime, you can chalk up as another frantic failure "The Glass Bottom Boat," (which) chugged into the Music Hall yesterday, and promptly sank. However, the picture is not without a certain historical interest. Miss Day,... seems now to recognize the existence of time... she is cast as a sweet widow, for no particular purpose, it seems, except to explain why such a lovely thing would be single in the summertime of her years. ... Unfortunately, Mr. Freeman's screenplay is predictable when it shows any inner logic, and simply absurd when it doesn't... the cast does include some of Hollywood's best farceurs, among them John McGiver, Paul Lynde and Edward Andrews. The best of the lot, however, is a newcomer, Dom De Luise, ...The picture's nicest inspiration may be the line, heard early, which explains Miss Day's marital status. Her husband, it's reported, was lost in a diving bell off the Bahamas. Just what he was doing there is left to our speculation. Could he really have been trying to get away from Miss Day? It's almost too terrifying — too anti-American—to contemplate.”

On Rotten Tomatoes, the film holds a critical approval of 57%, based on 7 reviews, with an average rating of 5.6/10.

Day followed up with Caprice (1967), a comedy-thriller more completely in the spy spoof genre, again with Tashlin directing, but it was a critical and commercial failure.

== Home media ==
The DVD of The Glass Bottom Boat (released in 2005) includes three vintage featurettes (Catalina Island, Every Girl's Dream, and NASA), as well as the Oscar-Winning cartoon The Dot and the Line.

== See also ==
- List of American films of 1966
- The Pritzker Estate
