= Pritzker Estate =

Private estate in Los Angeles, California, United States

The Pritzker Estate

General information
- Type: House
- Location: 1261 Angelo Drive; Los Angeles, California, 90210
- Coordinates: 34°05′27″N 118°26′13″W
- Construction started: 2005
- Completed: 2011
- Governing body: Private

Technical details
- Floor area: 49,300 square feet (4,580 m^{2})

The Pritzker Estate is a private residence located at 1261 Angelo Drive in the city of Los Angeles, in which the structure ranks as the second largest private residence. This is also the third largest home in the entire Los Angeles metropolitan area. The enormous mansion was built between 2005 and 2011 for billionaire Anthony Pritzker, one of several heirs to the Hyatt Hotel fortune. Located in the exclusive Beverly Crest neighborhood, the gargantuan home has been dubbed the "Grand Hyatt Bel Air" by disapproving neighbors, in reference to its extraordinary size.

== History ==
The previous home occupying a 3-acre tract at 1261 Angelo Drive was known as Ridgetop for its elevated location, situated on tract 6774, lot 24. The house was designed by architect David Lyle Fowler for his mother Carolyn Fowler Davis, completed in early 1963 in the Mid-century modern style embodying the utmost 1960s sophistication. The uniquely circular-shaped residence enclosed an inner courtyard with a swimming pool traversed by a footbridge, a home with an elliptical-themed motif including matching elliptical furniture. The one-story house contained 22 rooms and 5,444 square feet (505.8 m^{2}) of living space including four bedrooms and six bathrooms. The structure was perched atop a promontory measuring roughly 10,000 square feet (930 m^{2}) with sweeping views of Los Angeles and fronted by a single-space carport.

The Hollywood film industry used the new home in the 1966 romantic comedy The Glass Bottom Boat starring Doris Day and Rod Taylor, appearing as the private residence of Taylor's character Bruce Templeton. Prior to the movie's release but unrelated in nature, the residence was featured in Architectural Digest magazine during the spring of 1966 (Volume 22, Issue 4, pages 102–105), captured by famed photographer Julius Shulman.

The home was sold for US$2.8 million on September 17, 1999. Soon after, it appeared in two additional movies including the 2000 comedy titled Hanging Up starring Diane Keaton, Meg Ryan, and Lisa Kudrow. In that film, the home served as the private residence of Walter Matthau's character Lou Mozell in what would be the final appearance of the actor's 50-year Hollywood career. The following year, the house was featured in the 2001 film The Fast and the Furious appearing as the undercover headquarters of the LAPD and FBI. The movie script incorrectly states that singer Eddie Fisher built the house for his actress wife Elizabeth Taylor during the 1950s.

The home was listed for sale on September 13, 2000, but delisted on March 13, 2001. The corporation known as 1261 Angelo Drive, LLC was created on June 3, 2002, a common tactic for high-profile individuals to anonymously purchase real estate. Later that year the Pritzker family acquired the home at 1261 Angelo Drive and the house was quickly demolished, despite efforts by the Los Angeles Conservancy to prevent its destruction. The lot was appealing because of its location near Beverly Hills and the high vantage point that offered 180-degree unobstructed views of Los Angeles.

== Construction ==
Additional land was purchased on April 14, 2005, for US$14.7 million. The Pritzker family was granted permission to erect a 60-car parking lot on the site, an unusual request for an upscale residential area. Once approved, construction began in 2005. Over the next 3–5 years, a concrete platform was built into the side of the hill measuring approximately 250 by 750 feet (76 m × 229 m) and lines for parking spaces were painted. Retaining walls stood 50 feet (15 m) tall. Permits were gradually secured over time to add a home, a basement, an additional basement, and finally a security house.

The mansion was designed by Paris-based architecture firm Designrealization, led by Ed Tuttle and built by Peter McCoy Construction. The mansion was finally completed in November 2011. With construction finished, the Pritzkers sold their Bel Air home of 12,289 square feet (1,141.7 m^{2}), where they had lived for a decade, for US$21,990,000.

== Description ==
The main house at 1261 Angelo Drive features 49,300 square feet (4,580 m^{2}) of living space and at least 5,110 square feet (475 m^{2}) in additional structures. Ancillary buildings include a guest house of 3,335 square feet (309.8 m^{2}), a pool house of 525 square feet (48.8 m^{2}), and living quarters of 1,250 square feet (116 m^{2}) for the caretakers and full-time professional staff.

The home has two underground levels including a game room, a two-lane bowling alley, an entertainment foyer with a bar, and his and hers offices. The two levels above ground include a library, a fitness room, a gymnasium with an attached locker room, a spa, a beauty salon, and a restaurant-sized kitchen. The property features geothermal heating and cooling, energy-efficient lighting, climate control, and roof-mounted solar panels. The house has a plaza-sized central courtyard, a subterranean parking structure and a tennis court.

The property hosted a political party for Mitt Romney in 2012 and a Cirque de Soleil performance in 2014.

== See also ==
- List of largest houses in the Los Angeles Metropolitan Area
- List of largest houses in the United States
