= Point Blank (1998 film) =

- DVD cover
- Directed by: Matt Earl Beesley
- Written by: Jim Bannon; Chuck Konzelman; Daniel Raskov; Cary Solomon
- Produced by: Nile Niami; Patrick D. Choi
- Starring: Mickey Rourke
- Cinematography: Keith L. Smith
- Edited by: Edward R. Abroms
- Music by: Stephen Edwards
- Production companies: Interlight; New Cinema Co.
- Release date: 15 December 1998
- Running time: 89 minutes
- Country: United States
- Language: English

Point Blank is a 1998 American independent action film film directed by Matt Earl Beesley and written by Jim Bannon, Chuck Konzelman, Daniel Raskov, and Cary Solomon. The film stars Mickey Rourke as the ex-Texas Ranger son of a Texas rancher who takes on armed prison escapees, including his brother, that takeover a Fort Worth shopping mall and hold hostages for ransom. The film also stars Danny Trejo and Frederic Forrest.

The film was shot on location in Fort Worth, Texas and was released direct-to-video.

== Premise ==
A group of escapees from prison take over a shopping mall, only to be stopped by the brother of one of the fugitives.

== Cast ==
- Mickey Rourke as Rudy Ray
- Danny Trejo as Wallace Black
- Kevin Gage as Joe Ray
- James Gammon as Dad
- Frederic Forrest as Mac Bradford
- Paul Ben-Victor as Howard Daniels
