= Le Palais, Beverly Hills =

Private estate in Beverly Hills, California

Coordinates: 34.082190°N 118.412773°W

Le Palais also known as "The Crescent Palace," is a three-story French chateau-style limestone mega-mansion completed in 2012 by luxury real estate developer Mohamed Hadid just 15 months after breaking ground. It is the 4th largest private residence by square footage in the Greater Los Angeles Metropolitan Area.

The 48,000-square-foot, 7-bedroom, 11-bathroom home sits on a comparatively small 1.09-acre lot. The estate was listed at $58 million (USD) and was purchased by the president of Uzbekistan Islam Karimov's youngest daughter Lola Karimova-Tillyaeva. The lot located at 904 North Crescent Drive, was at one time the site of silent movie star Gloria Swanson's estate. She had purchased the 22 room (5 bath) home in 1922 from its original owner, the inventor of the double-edge safety razor, King C. Gillette who had in 1901 founded the Gillette Company in Boston, Massachusetts. The house was a restrained Southern California adaptation of the Italian Renaissance style, with cream color stucco walls and a red tile roof. Much like the current structure standing in its place, the former 2-story house when completed in the early 20th century was one of the largest residences in Beverly Hills. It measured 115 feet wide and 100 feet deep. The lot is located near the historic Beverly Hills Hotel within the famous 90210 ZIP code.

Featuring contemporary interiors that include formal and informal dining rooms, family room with lounge bar, library with leather panels all around, 90-foot art gallery, 7 indoor fireplaces, 3 outdoor fireplaces, 20-person spa, outdoor kitchen, professional grade screening room, ball room, 4 rose gardens, indoor pool pavilion, outdoor 60' infinity pool, and a standalone swan pond. The third floor of the residence boasts lavish amenities that include a chandelier-adorned balcony and his-and-her-bathrooms with a hidden stairwell leading to the 3,800-square-foot garden on top of the roof.
