= Beverly Estate =

Historic Property in Beverly Hills, California

Coordinates: 34.0890°N 118.4139°W

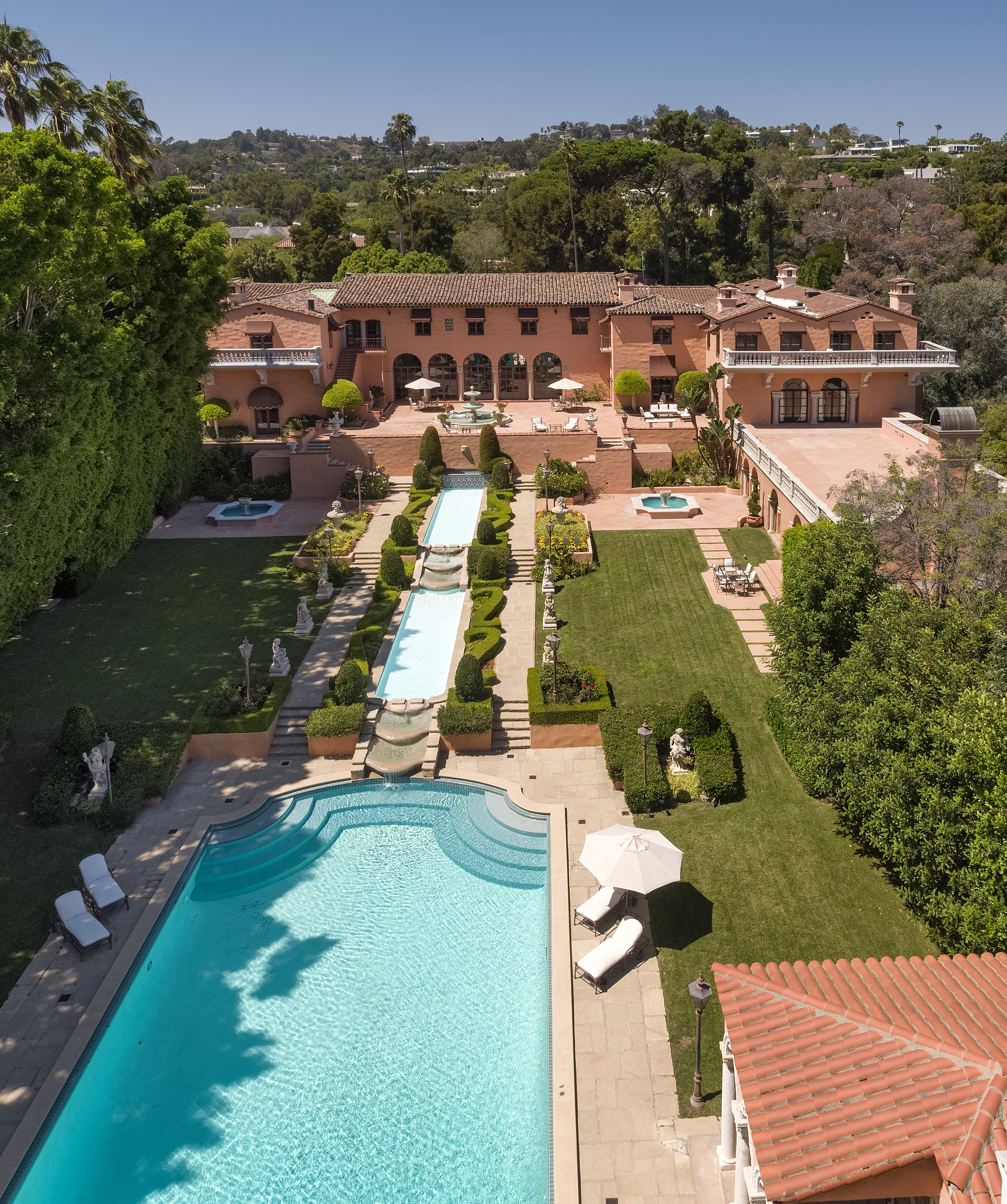
- The estate in 2017
- Interactive map of the Beverly Estate area
- Former names: Hearst Estate, Hearst Mansion, Beverly House

General information
- Location: Beverly Hills, California, 1011 North Beverly Drive, Beverly Hills, CA
- Owner: Nicolas Berggruen

Design and construction
- Architect: Gordon Kaufmann

The Beverly Estate is a property built in 1926 at 1011 North Beverly Drive in Beverly Hills, California.

The estate was designed by architect Gordon Kaufmann for banker Milton Getz and was the residence of actress Marion Davies and her partner William Randolph Hearst after his infirmity forced them to leave San Simeon. Several films have been shot on location there, including The Jerk, The Godfather, and The Bodyguard. It was known as the Hearst Mansion, the Hearst Estate, and the Beverly House before it was renamed the Beverly Estate in 2022.

== History ==
In 1924, eight acres were purchased near the Beverly Hills Hotel. In 1926, construction began on the Beverly Estate. It was designed by architect Gordon Kaufmann for banker Milton Getz. The design was influenced by the classical works of the European masters and the villas on the French and Italian Riviera. Artist Hugo Ballin was commissioned to paint interior murals in the home. Getz sold the home in 1941. In 1946, actress Marion Davies purchased the estate for herself and William Randolph Hearst when Hearst's physical condition forced them to leave his palatial estate San Simeon. The couple initiated the expansion of the main house. After Hearst's death in 1951, Davies continued to live at the estate.

In 1976, financier, real estate investor, and lawyer Leonard M. Ross purchased the Beverly Estate for $473,000 USD and listed the property for sale in 2016 for $195 million USD During the 1990s, Ross renovated the property. He increased the area and upgraded security features. In June 2021, the estate went into foreclosure, and after several deductions, the bankruptcy court listed the asking price at $69.95 million USD. In September 2021, Nicolas Berggruen won the bid and purchased the property for $63.1 million. a record price for a house sold at auction until The One sold for $126 million in 2022.

In September 2021, the estate was 3.53 acres (1.43 ha). Berggruen expanded it by purchasing an adjacent lot that included the original Hearst pool, thereby adding 1.10 acres and 5,991 square feet of living space to the estate. Berggruen purchased another nearby property built in 1954. The three properties form a compound totaling 5.5 acres (2.2 ha).

The property has undergone multiple name changes. It was originally known as The Getz House. It was named the Beverly House when Marion Davies and William Randolph Hearst occupied it. Following their deaths, it was known as the Hearst Estate. In 2022, it was renamed the Beverly Estate.

== Architecture ==
As of 2022, the five and a half acre property contains eight structures, including the mansion and homes on adjacent lots. The total living space on the estate is approximately 50,000 square feet, with 28 bedrooms and 38 bathrooms.

The original estate was designed in the shape of an "H" with the main house having eight bedrooms, 15 bathrooms, and nearly 29,000 square feet (2,700 m^{2}). The entrance of the mansion opens into a 50-foot-long gallery. It leads to a sitting room with a 22-foot-high, barrel-vaulted ceiling. The home has a billiards room with an antique fireplace. In 2018, a painting of Marion Davies occupied the same room. The home has an Art Deco nightclub, two-story library, four bars, one wine cellar, and two screening rooms. There are 12 fireplaces. There are two apartments for guests. The estate also features a spa with a gym and massage room. It has a 725-foot driveway.

The mansion is influenced by multiple architectural styles. It predominantly showcases the Mediterranean Revival style. There is a Spanish colonial facade. The exterior has French-style gardens, fountains, and statues. Grecian columns are along the exterior with large terraces outside the home. The landscaping was designed by Paul Thiene.

There is a seven-bedroom guest house with a pool, a tennis pavilion, pool house, guardhouse, a two-story five-bedroom gatehouse, and a near-Olympic size swimming pool. The property includes a lighted tennis court, two ponds, and reflecting pools. The property is secured by four stylized security gates.

== In popular culture ==
- In 1953, Marion Davies offered the estate to newlyweds Jacqueline Kennedy and future president John F. Kennedy to spend their honeymoon.
- The 1966 film Harper starring Paul Newman used the mansion and its pool as the location for the fictional Sampson family's estate
- In the 1971 Columbo episode "Death Lends a Hand", the estate served as the home of the character Arthur Kennicutt, played by Ray Milland.
- The estate can be seen in the 1972 film The Godfather. It was the location for the exteriors of the scene in which the character Jack Woltz awakens to find a severed horse’s head in his bed.
- The estate was the home for Steve Martin’s character in the 1979 film The Jerk, and was also used in an episode of Charlie’s Angels.
- It was used as a location for The Bodyguard (1992), starring Kevin Costner and Whitney Houston.
- In February 2012, singer Rihanna threw her 24th birthday party at the estate. In 2019, singer Adele held her 31st birthday there. It is where the 2020 Black Is King visual album by Beyoncé was filmed.
