= Rafael Manzano Martos =

Spanish architect (born 1936)

- Born: 6 November 1936 (age 89); Cádiz, Spain
- Occupation: Architect
- Spouse: Concepción Pérez Montes (deceased)
- Children: Julia María and Miguel Ángel
- Parent(s): Rafael Manzano Trujillo; María Luisa Martos Lalanne
- Awards: Knight Commander of the Civil Order of Alfonso X, the Wise, 1967; Golden Medal of the Fine Arts, 1972; Shiller Prize, 1980; Silver Medal of Osuna, 2001; Richard H. Driehaus Prize for Classical Architecture, 2010; Pro Ecclesia et Pontifice Medal, 2021; Federico Joly Prize, 2022
- Practice: Estudio Manzano

Rafael Manzano Martos (born in Cádiz, Spain on 6 November 1936) is a Spanish architect. He was educated at the Superior Technical School of Architecture in Madrid. He was a disciple of Professors Manuel Gómez-Moreno Martínez, Leopoldo Torres Balbás, Fernando Chueca Goitia and Francisco Íñiguez Almech.

Manzano is a representative of New Urbanism and New Classical Architecture. There is an architecture prize named after him, the Rafael Manzano Prize for New Traditional Architecture.

== Education ==
Rafael Manzano Martos earned his degree from the Technical School of Architecture in Madrid in 1961, and his Doctorate in 1963. As a student under Professors Gómez-Moreno Martínez, Torres Balbás, Chueca Goitia and Íñiguez Almech, he specialized in historic studies and in the Theory and Techniques of Monument Restoration. He was also a collaborator at the School of Arab Studies in Madrid from 1956 to 1963, where he cultivated his interest in Islamic history and archaeology.

== Selected works and projects ==
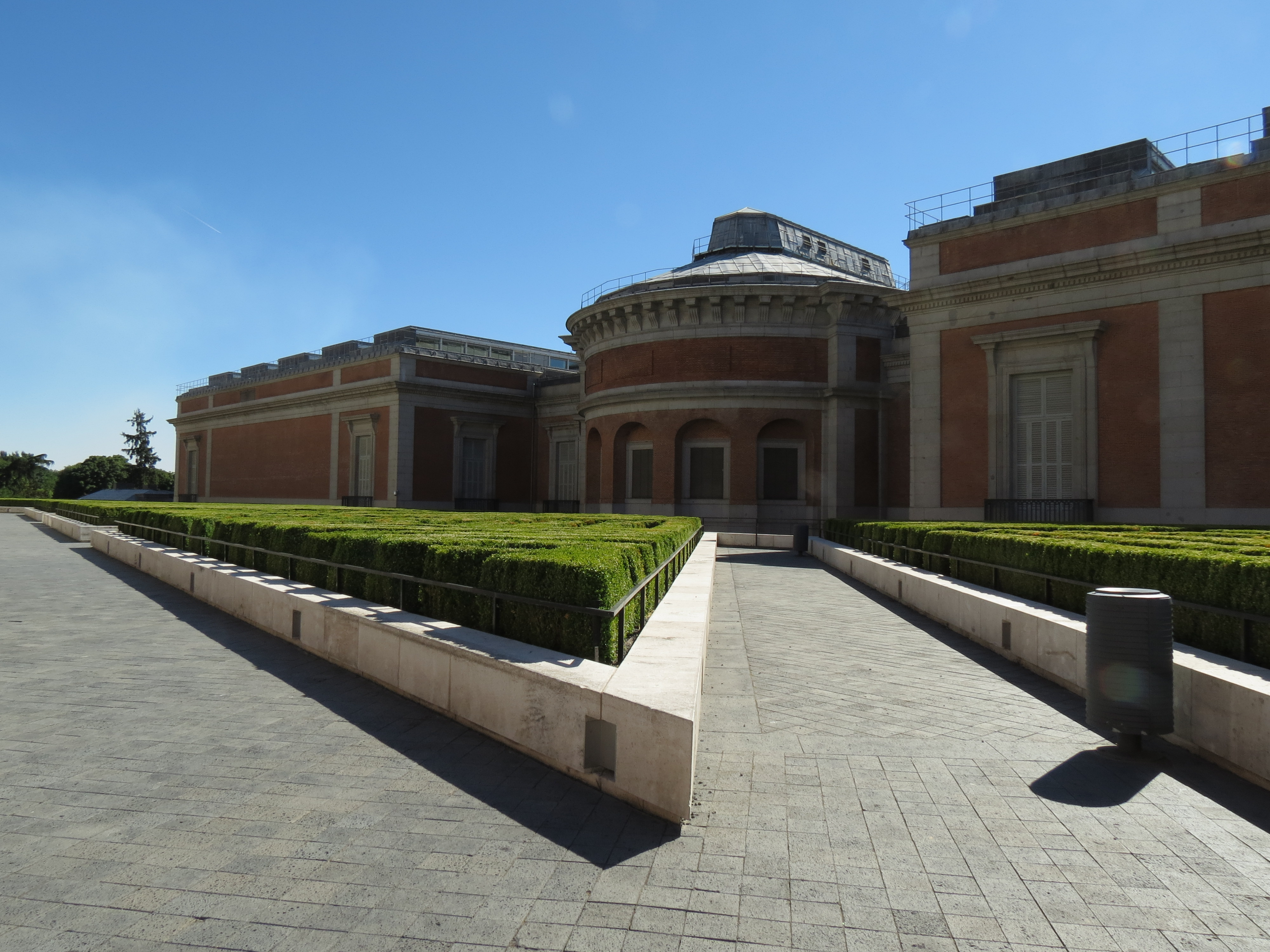
Museo del Prado Extension

In all of his works, he has expressed his faithfulness to the classical idiom and to the integration of his work in the urban setting or in the rural landscape. In his restorations of monuments, he has avoided any aggressive approach to the buildings of the past, respecting the architecture handed down and complementing it with a simple yet academic architecture that integrates into the monument without any visual aggression or turning it into a pretext for creating a contemporary work of questionable quality.

He has restored and consolidated the following monuments, among others:

- Squares and the Basílica de Santa Maria de Castelló d'Empúries, Girona.
- Cathedral Square in Tarragona.
- Fortress of the Old Cathedral of Lleida.
- Church of Mary Magdalene in Tarazona.
- Castle of Alcañiz, Turiel.
- Church of Saint Michael, in Cuenca.
- Complete external reconstruction and new interiors for the Royal Academy of Pharmacy, in Madrid.
- Reconstruction of the cloisters, tower, chapter room, stairway and other parts of the “Sobrado de los Monjes” Monastery in La Coruña.
- Total reconstruction of the former Palace of the Dukes of Medina Sidonia in Córdoba.
- Alcazaba of Málaga (Restorations and anastylosis of the housing nearby).
- Church of Saint Dionysius with reconstruction of its lost roofing and discovery of its Gothic-Mudejar brickwork in Jerez de la Frontera, Cádiz.
- “Palacio de las Dueñas”, “Casa del Rey Moro” and other major buildings in Seville.
- Consolidations of the ruins of Itálica in Santiponce, and construction of its monographic museum.
- Total restoration of the Church of Saint George in Palos de la Frontera and organization of its surroundings.
- Designer, together with the architect Fernando Chueca Goitia, of three major projects for the enlargement of the Prado Museum (1972–74 and 1990).
- Excavation of the site of the former “Casa de Contratación de las Indias”, with reconstruction of its Almohad courtyard and garden and a new facade.
- Designer, in 1991, of the total restoration and decoration of Hotel Alfonso XIII in Seville.
- “Hacienda De La Paz” estate for John Z. Blazevich in Los Angeles, California (with the decorator Manuel Gavira Sanjuan).
- Design of a residence for the bullfighter Curro Romero in Coín, Málaga; now belonging to the singer Julio Iglesias.

== Awards and honors ==
Manzano is a member of several Spanish academic institutions, including the Royal Academy of Fine Arts of San Fernando, the Royal Academies of the History and of Fine arts of Granada, Córdoba, Cádiz, Málaga, Écija, Toledo and La Coruña, and the Academy of the Good Letters of Seville.

In Spain he received the Golden Medal of the Fine Arts (13 April 1972) and he is Knight Commander of the Civil Order of Alfonso X, the Wise (7 November 1967).

In terms of international acclaim he was awarded with the 2010 Richard H. Driehaus Prize for Traditional and Classical Architecture for his entire career.

Previously, in 1980 he received the Shiller Prize for Restoration and Conservation.

Also, he received the Silver Medal of the City of Osuna in 2001.

On 9 April 2021, he received the Pro Ecclesia et Pontifice Medal for his service to the Catholic Church.

In January 2022, he received the Federico Joly Prize.

== Selected bibliography ==
- José Guerrero Lovillo, Rafael Manzano Martos, and Enrique de la Vega Viguera. Tres Estudios Sobre Sevilla. Sevilla: Real Academia Sevillana de Buenas Letras, 1984.
- Rafael Manzano Martos, Fernando Chueca Goitia and Real Academia de Bellas Artes de San Fernando. La Qubba, Aula Regia En La España Musulmana. Madrid : Real Academia de Bellas Artes de San Fernando, 1994.
- Rafael Manzano Martos. La Alhambra : El Universo Mágico De La Granada Islámica. Madrid: Grupo Anaya, 1992.
- Rafael Manzano Martos. El Jardín En La España Musulmana, edited by Real Academia de Bellas Artes de Santa Isabel de Hungría. Sevilla: 1990.
