= Nile Niami =

American producer and property developer

Nile Niami (born February 25, 1968) is an American former film producer turned real estate developer, who has developed and sold multimillion-dollar mansions in the Los Angeles neighborhoods of Bel Air and Holmby Hills.

== Early life ==
Niami was born in 1968 in Los Angeles, California. He was raised by a single mother, a special education teacher.

== Career ==
Niami started his career as a film producer. He produced 15 films, many of them B movies, before he started developing small condominiums and renovating homes to sell.

As a real estate developer in Los Angeles, Niami developed a mansion in Holmby Hills which he sold to a Saudi buyer for US$44 million. He developed another house in Holmby Hills, which was purchased by music mogul Sean Combs for US$39 million in 2014. He also hired architect Paul McClean to build a house for the Winklevoss twins Cameron and Tyler in the Bird Streets (north of Sunset Boulevard). He developed a house in Trousdale Estates, a neighborhood in the city of Beverly Hills, with "a spinning car turntable, similar to those in auto showrooms, that's visible from the living room."

Niami launched Wolfpack, a mobile app for single men looking for friends; it is no longer available.

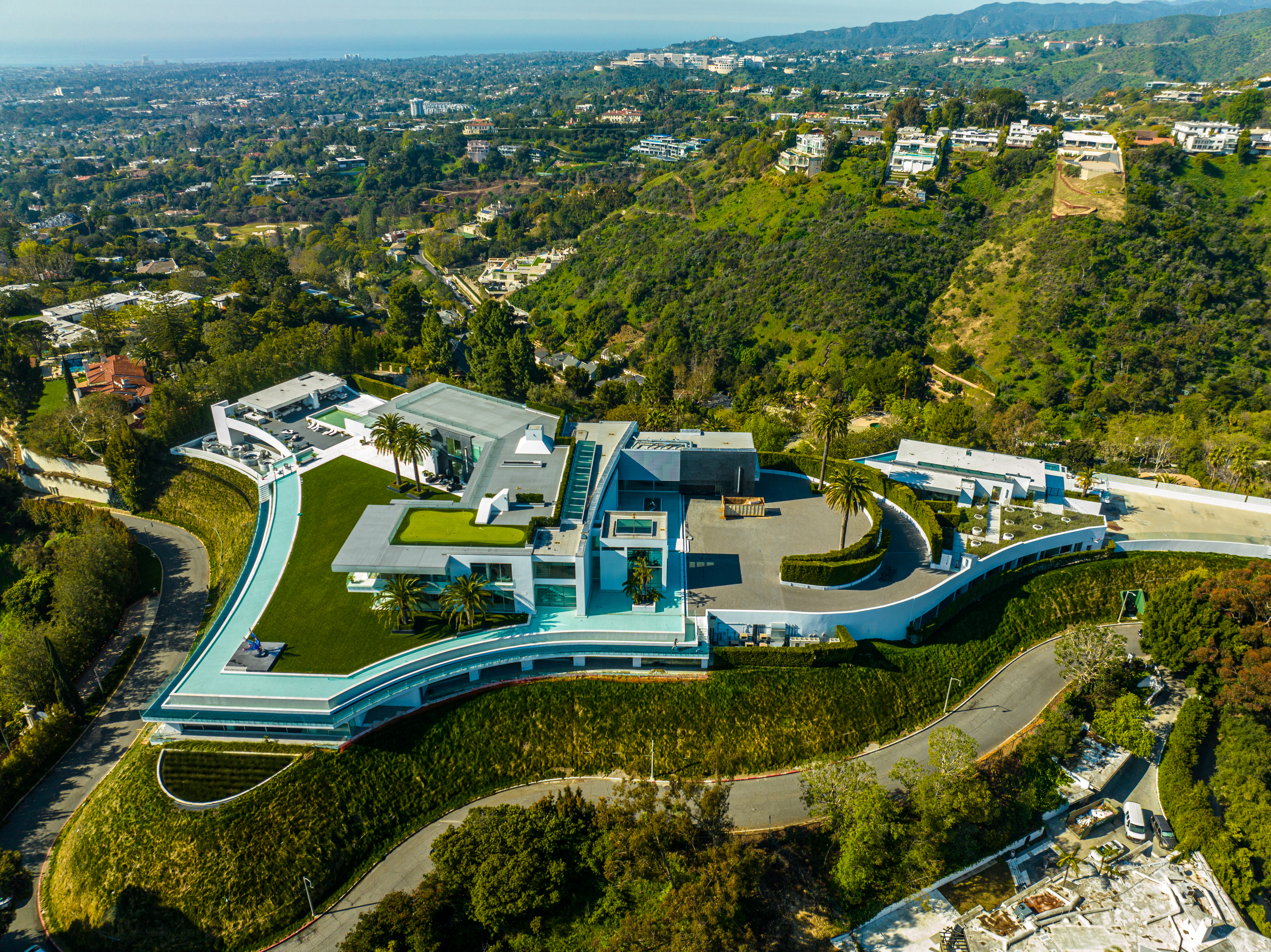
The One as seen in March 2023

=== "The One" ===
Niami began construction on a mega-mansion in Bel-Air named "The One" in 2014, which was also designed by Paul McClean. After years of development and numerous delays, Niami's company went bankrupt in 2021 before construction was completed. The construction attracted unease from the Bel-Air Homeowners Alliance, whose chairman, Fred Rosen, suggested it was so big it should have been "considered a commercial project", subject to more restrictive regulations. It was billed as the most expensive private residence in the United States, and at 105,000 square feet, is one of the country's largest private homes.

The property features 21 bedrooms, 42 bathrooms, multiple kitchens, a nightclub, four-lane bowling alley, salon, gym, 50-seat movie theater, a running track, multiple pools, a 50-car underground garage, and a moat. The home was used as a filming location for the Apple TV+ series Loot.

In March 2021, Niami's LLC, Crestlloyd, defaulted on US$165 million in debt related to the property, causing it to enter receivership. A foreclosure sale scheduled for October 2021 was halted when Crestlloyd filed for Chapter 11 bankruptcy. In July 2021, the 3.8-acre property was placed in court-ordered receivership by Los Angeles County Superior Court. Ted Lanes of Lanes Management was appointed as receiver.

During construction, Niami initially stated the home would be listed for US$500 million. It was formally listed for sale in January 2022 at an asking price of US$295 million. It did not receive an offer and on March 4, 2022, the property was sold at a bankruptcy auction to Richard Saghian, the owner of Fashion Nova, for US$126 million. It became the most expensive home ever sold at an auction in the United States, breaking the previous record set in 2021 when the Hearst Estate in Beverly Hills sold for US$63.1 million, but fell short of the California sales record of US$177 million set by a Malibu mansion purchased by Marc Andreessen in 2021. Its sale price was considered a disappointment, as the mansion had accrued $256 million of debt from its construction, and required at least $10 million of additional work to receive a certificate of occupancy and fix issues such as cracked marble and water leakage. Niami unsuccessfully attempted to block the sale to Saghian.

== Personal life ==
Niami purchased Scooter Braun's Bel Air house for US$9.5 million in July 2015.

== Filmography ==
=== As producer ===
- Galaxis (1995)
- DNA (1996)
- T.N.T. (1997)
- Point Blank (1998)
- The Patriot (1998)
- The Survivor (1998)
- Resurrection (1999)
- Justice (1999)
- The Watcher (2000)
- Camouflage (2001)
- Tart (2001)
