= Camm Morton =

American businessman (born 1951)

- Born: June 12, 1951 (age 75); Birmingham, Alabama
- Education: Hampden-Sydney College, University of Florida, East Carolina University
- Occupations: Businessman, investment banker

Claude Cammack "Camm" Morton (born June 12, 1951) is an American businessman, investment banker and entrepreneur.

== Early life and education ==
Morton was born in Birmingham, Alabama. and is the son of Emily Cammack and Claude Morton Jr. Claude Morton was a real estate professional for The Equitable Life Assurance Company. Throughout his long career, Claude Morton was subject to transfer, moving his family to New Orleans, Louisiana and then on to Richmond, Virginia.

Morton graduated from Huguenot High School of Richmond, Virginia in 1969. In 1973, he earned his bachelor's degree in economics from Hampden-Sydney College in Hampden-Sydney, Virginia where he was a 4-year letterman in football, junior class president, Chairman of the Honor Council, Who's Who in Colleges and Universities, and a member of the fraternity Kappa Alpha Order. In 1976, Camm received his master of science in horticulture from the University of Florida in Gainesville, Florida and in 1980 earned his M.B.A. from East Carolina University in Greenville, North Carolina.

== Career ==
From 1976 to 1980, Morton worked for DuPont in Greensboro and Greenville, North Carolina as a sales representative while pursuing his M.B.A. In 1980, after graduating from East Carolina University, he accepted a position with Rhone-Poulenc in North Brunswick, New Jersey as a Product Manager.

In 1981, a chance meeting with the owners of the Kravco Company—a Philadelphia-based regional mall developer—landed him a job as a department store relations manager working directly for Kravco President Bob Girling.

Working as the President of Retail Development for Western Development Corporation, where Morton would apply his retail shopping center skills as the developer in charge of creating Potomac Mills, an outlet mall in Woodbridge, Virginia, in the Washington, D.C. metropolitan area, Potomac Mills was later deemed "one of the most significant developments in retail" and was the prototype development of the Mills concept, In 1992 it was touted as the state's top tourist destination

Morton founded his first company, Charter Oak Partners, in 1986. Later affiliated with Rothschild Realty of New York City, where Morton later became a managing director, Charter Oak Partners grew to over 3.3 million square feet of retail assets through the development and acquisition of outlet properties across the United States. It was acquired by Tanger Factory Outlet Centers for $491 million.

In 1994, Morton was hired as president and chief operating officer by Factory Outlets of America and later became the president and CEO. In 1998 the company became Konover Property Trust and in 2002, was acquired by Kimco Realty (NYSE: KIM)—a Real Estate Investment Trust (REIT) headquartered in New Hyde Park, New York owning and operating North America's largest portfolio of neighborhood and community shopping centers—and Chelsea Property Group, Inc. (NYSE: CPG) of Roseland, New Jersey, which is now a subsidiary of retail giant Simon Property Group.

In 2002, Morton was recruited by the Baton Rouge Area Foundation to manage its portfolio of commercial properties as president and CEO of Commercial Properties Development Corporation (CPDC). While at CPDC, Morton proposed and steered its conversion to a "REIT"—Real Estate Investment Trust—and was instrumental in leading several significant redevelopment and revitalization projects including the renovation of a historic downtown property into the 300-room Hilton Baton Rouge Capitol Center.

In 2007, Morton formed the hotel management company Ashby Hospitality in partnership with CPRT.

Camm is the Principal/Owner of VR Baton Rouge—a business brokerage firm affiliated with VR Business Sales, VR Baton Rouge is based in Baton Rouge, Louisiana.
