= Bill Gates's house =

Mansion in Medina, Washington

Bill Gates' house
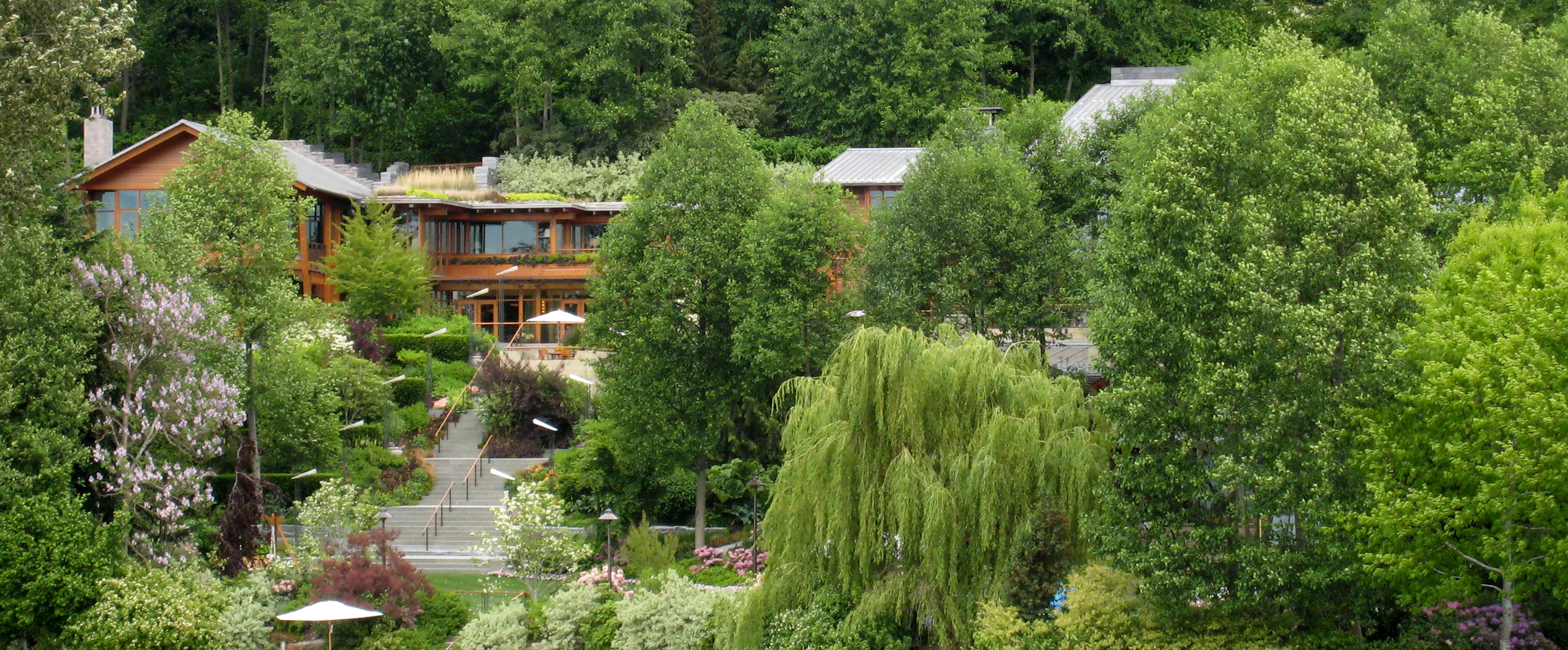
- Interactive map of the Bill Gates' house area

General information
- Architectural style: Pacific lodge
- Location: Medina, Washington, United States
- Coordinates: 47°37′40″N 122°14′31″W

Technical details
- Structural system: Earth-sheltered home

Bill Gates designed and owns a 66,000-square-foot (6,100 m^{2}) mansion that is on Lake Washington in Medina, Washington. In 2009, property taxes were reported to be US$1.063 million on a total assessed value of US$147.5 million.

== Design ==
The house was designed collaboratively by Bohlin Cywinski Jackson and Cutler-Anderson Architects of Bainbridge Island, Washington. The mansion is a modern design in the Pacific lodge style, with classic features such as a private library with a dome-shaped roof and oculus. The house features an estate-wide server system, a 60-foot (18 m) swimming pool with an underwater music system, a 2,500-square-foot (230 m^{2}) gym, and a 1,000-square-foot (93 m^{2}) dining room. There are six kitchens and 24 bathrooms, ten of which contain bathtubs.

== In popular culture ==
The house was made fun of in Dilbert in January 1997 when the lead character was forced to become a towel boy after his failure to read an end-user license agreement over purchased Microsoft software. Some news articles call the house Xanadu 2.0, a reference to the motion picture Citizen Kane, which was itself a reference to the opening lines of Samuel Taylor Coleridge's classic poem Kubla Khan.
