= John Paulson =

American hedge fund manager (born 1955)

- Born: John Alfred Paulson; December 14, 1955 (age 70); New York City, U.S.
- Education: New York University (BA); Harvard University (MBA)
- Known for: Founder of Paulson & Co.
- Political party: Republican
- Spouse: Jenny Zaharia (m. 2000; sep. 2021)
- Children: 3

John Alfred Paulson (born December 14, 1955) is an American billionaire hedge fund manager. He leads Paulson & Co., a New York-based investment management firm he founded in 1994. He has been called "one of the most prominent names in high finance".

He acquired much of his fortune in 2007 when he earned almost $4 billion and was transformed "from an obscure money manager into a financial legend" by using credit default swaps to effectively bet against the U.S. subprime mortgage lending market. In 2010, Paulson earned $4.9 billion. Forbes estimated his net worth at $3.8 billion as of August 2025.

== Early life and education ==
Paulson was born on December 14, 1955, in Queens, New York City, the third of four children of Alfred G. Paulson (1924–2002) and Jacqueline (née Boklan, 1926–2018).

His father was born Alfredo Guillermo Paulsen in Ecuador to a father of half French and half Norwegian descent and an Ecuadorian mother. Alfredo was orphaned at fifteen, and at age sixteen moved to Los Angeles with his younger brother, Alberto. Alfredo enlisted in the U.S. Army, where he served and was wounded in Italy during World War II. He later changed his surname from Paulsen to Paulson.

John's mother, Jacqueline, was the daughter of Jewish immigrants from Lithuania and Romania who had moved to New York City. She met Alfredo while they both attended UCLA. They wed and moved to New York City, where Alfredo worked at Arthur Andersen and later as the CFO at public-relations firm Ruder Finn.

After dropping out of college then realizing that his previously chosen career path in sales would not provide a steady and secure cash flow, John Paulson returned to NYU in 1976, where he began to excel in business studies. In 1978, he graduated valedictorian of his class summa cum laude in finance from New York University's College of Business and Public Administration. He went on to Harvard Business School, on a Sidney J. Weinberg/Goldman Sachs scholarship, earning an MBA as a George F. Baker Scholar (top 5 percent of his class) in 1980.

== Career ==
Paulson began his career at Boston Consulting Group in 1980 where he did research, providing advice to companies. Ambitious to work in investment on Wall Street, he left to join Odyssey Partners where he worked with Leon Levy. He moved on to Bear Stearns working in the mergers and acquisitions department, and then to Gruss Partners LP, where he was a general partner.

In 1994, he founded his own hedge fund, Paulson & Co., with $2 million and one employee, located in office space rented from Bear Stearns on the 26th floor of 277 Park Avenue. The firm moved to 57th and Madison in 2001. By 2003, his fund had grown to $300 million in assets.

Paulson and his company specialize in "event-driven" investments—i.e. in mergers, acquisitions, spin-offs, proxy contests, etc.—and he has made hundreds of such investments throughout his career. Many of the events involved merger arbitrage—which has been described as waiting "until one company announces that it's buying another, rushing to purchase the target company's shares, shorting the acquirer's stock (unless it's a cash deal), and then earn the differential between the two share prices when the merger closes." An example of a proxy event investment Paulson made was during Yahoo's proxy contest in May 2008, when Carl Icahn launched a proxy fight to try to replace Yahoo's board.

In 2010, he set another hedge fund record by making nearly $5 billion in a single year, primarily investing in the gold sector. However, in 2011, he made losing investments in Bank of America, Citigroup and the fraud-suspected China-based Canadian-listed company, Sino-Forest Corporation. His flagship fund, Paulson Advantage Fund, fell sharply in 2011. Paulson has also become a major investor in gold. In 2025, it was published that an abandoned Idaho gold mine controlled by Paulson, is in plans to be revived and bring in large profits to Paulson and his holding company.

== Subprime mortgage crisis ==
Paulson became world-famous in 2007 by shorting the US housing market, as he foresaw the subprime mortgage crisis and bet against mortgage-backed securities by investing in credit default swaps. Sometimes referred to as the greatest trade in history, Paulson's firm made a fortune and he earned over $4 billion personally on this trade alone.

Paulson worked with Goldman Sachs to provide liquidity for low-performing home loans in Arizona, California, Florida and Nevada. Together, Paulson and Goldman created the Abacus 2007-AC1 investment vehicle and kept Paulson's bet against the underlying assets hidden from people who purchased it. Paulson escaped indictment because his firm maintained that it was always transparent about its view of the mortgages that had been securitized and that the assets were not without risk. Goldman was sued by the Securities and Exchange Commission and had to reach a settlement for Abacus. On July 15, 2010, Goldman settled out of court, agreeing to pay the SEC and investors US$550 million, including $300 million to the U.S. government and $250 million to investors, one of the largest penalties ever paid by a Wall Street firm.

== Political and economic views ==
Paulson contributed $140,000 to political candidates and parties between 2000 and 2010, 45% of which went to Republicans, 16% to Democrats, and 36% to special interests, including former House Speaker John Boehner.

In 2008, Paulson co-wrote a Wall Street Journal op-ed piece suggesting an alternative to the Treasury Secretary's plan for stabilizing the markets. The alternative plan included recapitalizing the troubled financial institutions by spending the $700 billion Troubled Asset Relief Program funds to buy their senior preferred stock rather than their "worst assets".

In 2008 while testifying before US House Committee on Oversight and Government Reform Paulson was asked about the low tax rate on long-term capital gains and carried interest earnings and Paulson replied "I believe our tax situation is fair." In a 2012 interview with Bloomberg Businessweek magazine he expressed displeasure over the Occupy Wall Street movement, saying, "We pay a lot of taxes, especially living in New York—there's an almost 13 percent city and state tax rate. ... Most jurisdictions would want to have successful companies like ours located there. I'm sure if we wanted to go to Singapore, they'd roll out the red carpet to attract us."

In 2011, Paulson donated $1 million to Mitt Romney's Super PAC Restore Our Future. On April 26, 2012, Paulson hosted a fund-raiser at his New York townhouse for Romney's presidential candidacy.

At the 2014 Puerto Rico Investment Summit in San Juan, Paulson stated: "Puerto Rico will become the Singapore of the Caribbean." Paulson was reportedly investing in the territory's municipal debt and real estate developments, and was building a home at a resort.

Paulson donated $50,000 to Kathy Hochul in 2021. In 2025, he donated $250,000 to MAGA KY, a super PAC in opposition to Thomas Massie.

=== Support for Donald Trump ===
Paulson received media attention when he immediately backed Donald Trump after Trump secured the Republican nomination in 2016. Paulson served as one of the top economic advisers to Trump's 2016 presidential campaign. Paulson had established a relationship with Trump prior to the campaign, with Paulson and other investors having sold the Doral Golf Resort & Spa to Trump in 2012. Together with his spouse, Paulson contributed $831,370 to Trump's 2020 presidential campaign.

Paulson was a major fundraiser for Donald Trump's 2024 campaign. On April 6, 2024, the Trump campaign self-reported a $50.5 million fundraising haul at John Paulson's Palm Beach house. During the campaign, Paulson had publicly criticized offshoring of American manufacturing jobs; in June 2026, the musical instrument manufacturer Conn-Selmer, which is owned by Paulson's investment firm, closed its Eastlake, Ohio, brass instrument plant and moved the production to China.

Trump reportedly had considered Paulson for Secretary of the Treasury but chose Scott Bessent. Paulson said he had withdrawn his name from consideration because of "complex financial obligations".

== Wealth and philanthropy ==
New York University's Paulson Center sports complex, opened in 2023.

Between 2009 and 2011 Paulson made several charitable donations, including $15 million to the Center for Responsible Lending, $20 million to New York University Stern School of Business (auditorium now named after Paulson), $5 million to the Southampton Hospital on Long Island, $15 million to build a children's hospital in Guayaquil, Ecuador, and £2.5 million to the London School of Economics for the John A. Paulson Chair in European Political Economy.

In October 2012, Paulson donated $100 million to the Central Park Conservancy, the nonprofit organization that maintains New York City's Central Park. At the time of the donation, the gift represented the largest monetary donation in the history of New York City's park system. In June 2015, Paulson donated $400 million to Harvard University's School of Engineering and Applied Sciences (SEAS), the largest gift received in the university's history. Following the donation, the engineering school was renamed the Harvard John A. Paulson School of Engineering and Applied Sciences. The next month, he gifted $8.5 million to New York City's largest charter school organization, Success Academy, to change public education and open up middle schools in the Bedford-Stuyvesant area of Brooklyn and in the Hell's Kitchen area of Manhattan.

In 2022, New York University announced that Paulson had donated $100 million towards the cost of a new building in its Washington Square Campus. The building was named the John A. Paulson Center in recognition of the gift. He served on the Board of Trustees at NYU Stern from 2013 to 2021, as well as the Metropolitan Museum of Art from at least 2013 to 2018.

In 2024, the Hebrew University of Jerusalem awarded Paulson an honorary doctorate in recognition of his extensive philanthropic contributions to Israeli cultural and educational institutions. His support for Israeli initiatives includes a $27 million commitment to establish the Paulson Bar-El Building for Computer Science and Engineering at Hebrew University. Paulson also contributed significantly to the Tel Aviv Museum of Art in 2021 to celebrate the museum's 90th anniversary and has supported the Jerusalem Campus for the Arts.

In October 2026 Paulson announced a historic $250 million donation to the Hebrew University. The donation was intended for the building of a new Faculty of Engineering, to improve the medical faculty, and research into trauma. Following the donation, the university announced it would rename the Mt. Scopus campus to the Alina and John Paulson campus in appreciation of Paulson and his wife. At the time, it was the third-largest individual donation ever given to any Israeli university, and the largest one-time donation the Hebrew University had ever received.

== Personal life ==
In 2000, Paulson married Jenny Zaharia in an Episcopalian ceremony in Southampton, New York; Jenny is a Romanian immigrant who came to the United States after her brother George, a track star in Romania, defected and moved to Queens. The couple have two daughters and lived most of the year in a 28,500-square-foot Upper East Side townhouse on East 86th Street, bought in 2004 for $14.7 million. Paulson also owned a home in Aspen, Colorado, purchased for $24.5 million in 2010 and an estate in Southampton that he bought for $41 million in 2008.

In 2017, Paulson and his wife wrote a letter to the elite Manhattan Spence School, threatening to withdraw aid if the school continued its "alarming pattern" of "anti-white indoctrination". In the letter, they stated: "In fact for children of all races, we strongly believe that schools should value and define success in terms of hard work, earned accomplishment, merit, a commitment to academic rigor, and personal integrity."

Paulson filed for divorce in September 2021, but later withdrew his divorce action so that both sides could negotiate out of court and away from the media. In 2022, Zaharia sued Paulson for $1 billion in damages.

In 2024, Paulson was reportedly engaged to be married to clinical dietitian, Alina de Almeida, after three years of dating. De Almeida is 33 years his junior. In February 2025, the couple welcomed a daughter. In 2026, the couple announced they were expecting their second child together.

In September 2025, Paulson was accused by Republican Representative Thomas Massie of being named in Jeffrey Epstein's "black book."

== See also ==
- The Big Short and The Big Short (film) recount many of the events described in Gregory Zuckerman's 2009 book The Greatest Trade Ever: The Behind-the-Scenes Story of How John Paulson Defied Wall Street and Made Financial History
- List of New York University alumni
- List of Harvard University people
