= Fair Field =

Large private house in the Hamptons, Long Island, in New York State

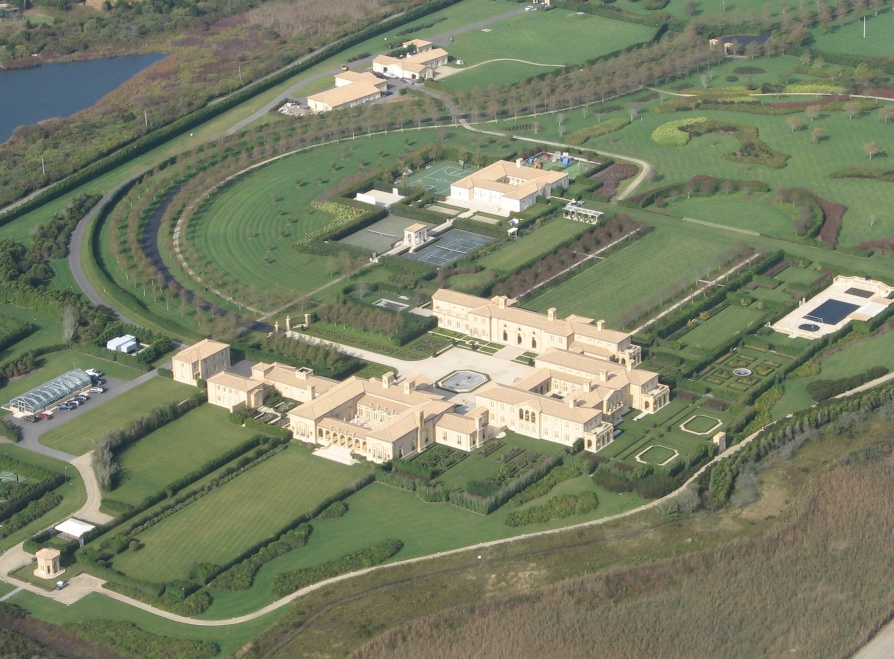
- Fair Field in 2006
- Interactive map of Fair Field

General information
- Location: 281 Daniels Lane, Sagaponack, NY
- Coordinates: 40°55′7.87″N 72°15′52.62″W
- Year built: 2003
- Owner: Ira Rennert
- Grounds: 63 acres (25 ha)

Fair Field is a large private house in Sagaponack, Long Island, in New York State in the United States. The main house is approximately 64,000 sq ft (5,900 m^{2}), and the total floor area is 110,000 sq ft (10,000 m^{2}). It is valued between $267 and $500 million for tax purposes. Built in 2003, it is owned by Ira Rennert.

The house is located on 63 acres (25 ha) of property fronting the Atlantic Ocean.

In response to concerns raised from local residents about the size of Rennert's proposed house, the Town of Southampton passed a resolution that subsequently limited the size of single family homes to a maximum floor area of 20,000 sq ft (1,900 m^{2}), unless an exception is granted by the town's Zoning Board of Appeals.
