= Pacific lodge =

Architectural style prevalent in the Northwestern United States

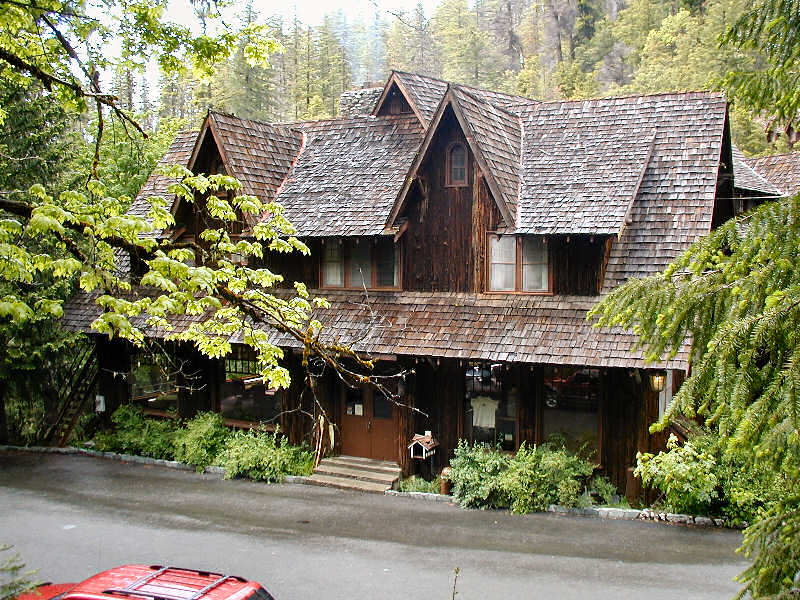
Oregon Caves Chateau at Oregon Caves National Monument.

The Pacific lodge style of architecture is based loosely on vague notions of cedar lodges and log cabin dwellings of early inhabitants of the Pacific Northwest region of the United States and Canada. This style can be seen in historic National Park hotels, such as the Lake Quinault Lodge, and in the houses of some wealthier Seattleites of the timber baron era. However, most early Seattleites preferred to mimic the accepted styles of the East; to this day, historical pastiches remain more popular throughout the region.

== History ==
The "Pacific Lodge" style of architecture is based on necessity. The homes were made out of nearby materials, which were often cedar and stone. The stone base seen in many Pacific Lodge homes is to both accent the nature around the house, as well as to protect it from snowfall and ground water. Most "Pacific Lodge" homes have unique sizes and shapes, and this is due to the fact that historically pacific lodge homes were built out of necessity. A small house was initially built and then later modified and expanded, creating a compound look.

== Design ==
Pacific Lodge homes often feature exposed wood exteriors and interiors, high ceilings with interlocking exposed beams, and large windows. Most "Pacific Lodge" houses are large to match the massive landscapes they are often built next to or on. Steeply angled roofs are used to keep off snow. Most roofs extend past the house a few feet to ensure that snow and water are not falling on or near the sides of the house.

== Architectural influences ==
The architectural style of "Pacific Lodge" homes is based on the log homes built in the northwest and national parks in the past. The biggest influence on the "Pacific Lodge" home was the lodges built in many western National Parks that still stand today. The railroad system had a huge influence on expanding the "Pacific Lodge" style of architecture as well. Buildings were needed to house both people and goods, and builders used whatever they had lying around. This led to the idea of tying houses in with nature and using locally sourced materials.

== Examples ==
- The Bill Gates estate is based on this style.
- Paradise Inn in the Paradise Historic District in Paradise, Washington is based on this style.

== See also ==
- National Park Service rustic
