= Hala Ranch =

Ranch in Aspen, Colorado

Coordinates: 39.246394°N 106.849573°W

The Hala Ranch is a 95-acre (380,000 m^{2}) estate located just north of Aspen, Colorado, originally purchased and given its name by Prince Bandar bin Sultan. The main house on the property was designed by the architectural firm of Hagman Yaw and built by Hansen Construction of Aspen, Colorado, in 1991. The estate has been ranked by Forbes magazine as the most expensive home in the United States, once listed at $135 million. John Paulson bought the ranch in 2007 for $49 million, according to the Wall Street Journal.

The Saudi Prince purchased the land while he served as ambassador to the United States, and originally visited about three times a year. The Prince's visits, which were always announced to local officials for security reasons, became less frequent after the terrorist attacks on September 11, 2001, which were carried out mostly by Saudi nationals. In 2007, Prince Bandar bin Sultan sold the estate, after accepting a position as National Security Councillor in Saudi Arabia.

The estate has its own wastewater treatment plant and a mechanical shop with its own gasoline pumps and car wash. Cross-country ski trails are maintained throughout the property. The centerpiece lodge of the estate is larger than the White House. It is built in a rustic style, with massive timber beams and stone columns, and contains 15 bedrooms, all with patios, and 16 bathrooms. There is also an interior elevator. The decoration of the interior features mahogany wood and bronze hardware, as well as stained glass windows and a wood-burning fireplace. The master wing has a room set aside for grooming, while guest rooms open onto a courtyard with a reflecting pool and waterfall. Other amenities of the estate include a commercial kitchen, a fishing pond, a racquetball court, a sophisticated security system, heated hay barn and stables, steam room, a swimming pool, and a tennis court.

In December 2007, the 14,395-square-foot (1,337.3 m^{2}) guesthouse was sold for a reported $36.5 million.
