= Pensmore =

One of the largest homes in the United States

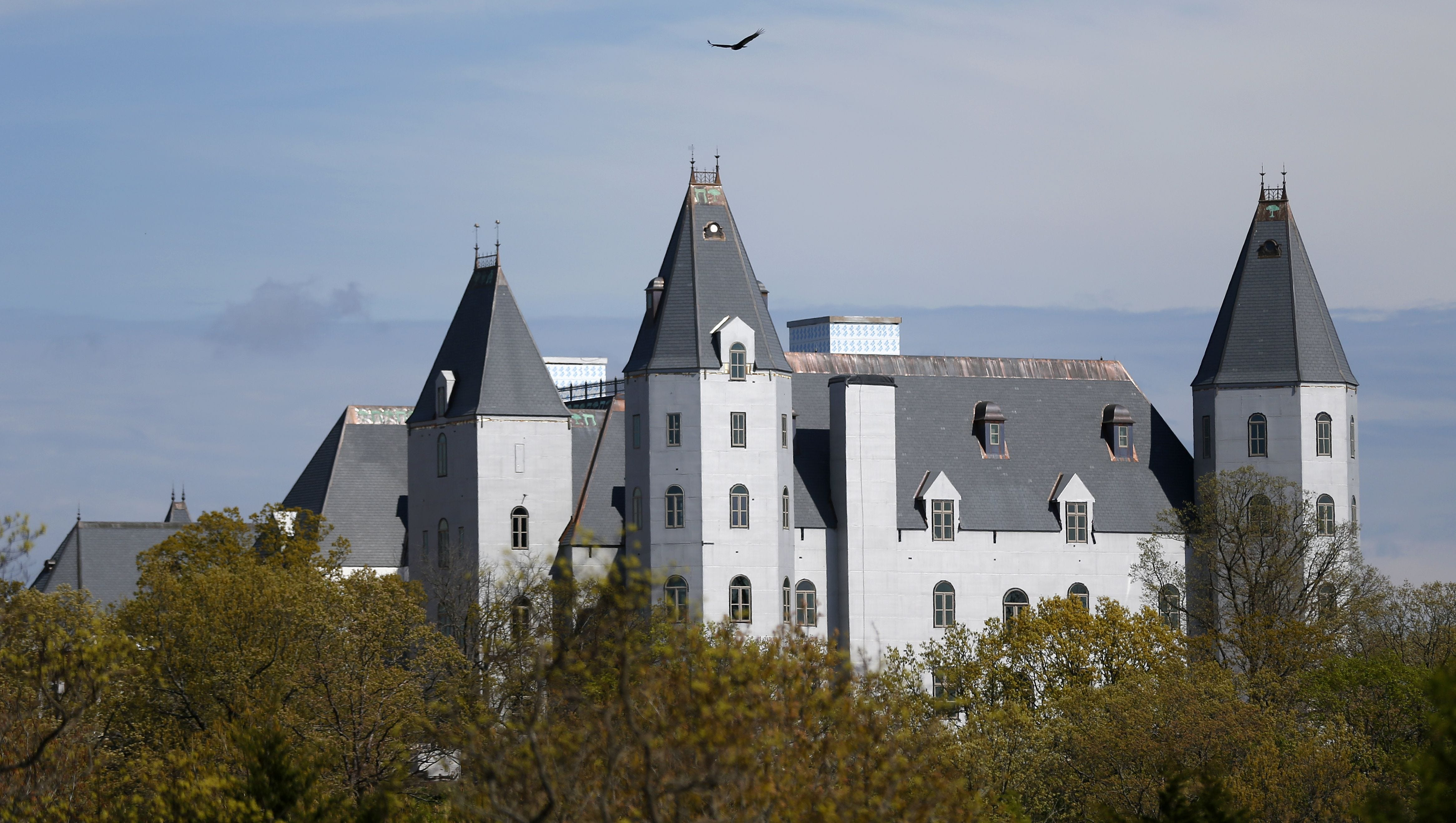
- Interactive map of the Pensmore area

General information
- Type: Insulated concrete form
- Architectural style: Châteauesque
- Location: 2700 Woods Fork Road, Highlandville, Missouri
- Coordinates: 36.8797°N 93.2125°W
- Construction started: 2008
- Completed: 2016
- Governing body: Private

Technical details
- Floor area: 72,215 square feet (6,709.0 m^{2})

Pensmore is a 72,000 square feet (6,700 m^{2}) home in the Ozark Mountains near Highlandville, Missouri. One of the largest homes in the United States, it has five stories, contains 14 baths and 13 bedrooms, has exterior walls 12 inches thick, and was designed to survive earthquakes, tornadoes, and bomb blasts. Its owner, Steven T. Huff, told The Kansas City Star in 2015 that "the house should stand for 2,000 years".

== Construction ==
In 2008, the Steven T. Huff Family LLC applied for a construction permit to begin construction of the Pensmore mansion – made unique because it is an insulated concrete form structure designed to showcase sustainable construction techniques on a large scale, with it being designed to be earthquake resistant, bullet resistant, blast resistant, capable of withstanding an EF5 tornado, bug resistant, and fire resistant. Its construction was completed in 2016.

The home's large size and its location in the Ozarks (which experiences both high and low temperatures, as well as tornadoes) were chosen so that Huff could explore how these concepts work on a commercial scale and under a broad range of climate conditions – while noting that it was built in an area where it was not subject to government building inspections or regulations.

== 2016 lawsuit and 2017 settlement ==
On July 3, 2016, the Associated Press reported that lawyers for Huff filed a lawsuit against Monarch Cement Company, of Humboldt, Kansas, and its Springfield subsidiary, City Wide Construction Products, seeking $63 million in damages and alleging that Pensmore was shorted more than 70,000 pounds of a crucial steel fiber, named Helix (invented in a laboratory at the University of Michigan, Helix is an alternative to rebar and was developed for the United States Army Corps of Engineers)—but a settlement being reached on 21 July 2017 with no terms about it being publicly revealed.
