= Steven T. Huff =

American businessman

Steven T. Huff (born 1951) is an American billionaire businessman, astrophysicist and inventor. After his careers in the United States Army and Central Intelligence Agency (CIA) he founded defense intelligence related companies he eventually sold. He is building one of the largest homes in the United States, Pensmore, and in retirement runs the Pensmore Foundation dedicated to philanthropy and voluntarism. His net worth is said to be around US$2.5 billion.

== Early life ==
Huff grew up in Scottsville, Virginia, moving to the Ozarks when he was 10, after which he attended Hampden-Sydney College in Virginia graduating summa cum laude and receiving his Bachelor of Science degree in physics. He then attended California Institute of Technology where he received his Master of Science degree in physics and became a member of Phi Beta Kappa society.

== Career ==
Upon graduation Huff served in the U.S. Army Intelligence Agency from 1975 to 1978, after which he was in the CIA from 1979 to 1983. After leaving the CIA, Huff was a co-founder of BDS, Inc.m a Sterling, Virginia-based computer reseller valued at $27 million that in 1992 merged with BDS Inc., a wholly owned subsidiary of Titan Corporation. In 1985 Huff founded Sensor Systems, Inc. as a consulting operation, merging it in 1993 with another company he founded and was vice president and Chief technology officer (CTO), Overwatch Systems, Ltd. that delivered multi-source intelligence to the United States Department of Defense. In 2009 Huff sold his companies Overwatch Geospatial Systems and Overwatch Tactical Operations to Textron Systems for what The Kansas City Star said was a gazillion dollars.

== Pensmore ==
In 2008, Huff bought TF Concrete Forming Systems and began construction of one of the largest homes in America named Pensmore, which was completed in 2016 and is located in the Ozark Mountains near Highlandville, Missouri.

== Pensmore Foundation ==
In 2005, Huff founded the Pensmore Foundation, whose National Taxonomy of Exempt Entities (NTEE) are listed as Philanthropy, Voluntarism and Grantmaking Foundations: Private Independent Foundations.
