= Fashion Nova =

American fast fashion retail company

Fashion Nova, Inc.
- Type: Store
- Industry: Retail
- Founded: 2006; 20 years ago
- Founder: Richard Saghian
- Headquarters: Los Angeles, California, U.S.
- Number of locations: 5
- Area served: Worldwide
- Products: Clothing
- Number of employees: 600
- Website: fashionnova.com

Fashion Nova is an American fast fashion retail company. It primarily operates online, but it also has five brick and mortar locations. Fashion Nova is known to use affiliate marketing, particularly on Instagram. Models, celebrities, and other customers receive payments or free clothing in exchange for generating publicity related to the company.

== History ==
Fashion Nova was founded in 2006 by its CEO, Richard Saghian, who started his career in the retail industry by working at his father's clothing boutique located in Los Angeles. Fashion Nova opened its first location inside the Panorama Mall in Panorama City, a neighborhood of Los Angeles, selling inexpensive clubwear attire. In 2013, Saghian launched the e-commerce website for Fashion Nova.

In 2016, Fashion Nova launched the Curve Collection. In 2018, the company expanded to menswear with the release of their Fashion Nova Men's line. In July 2018, Quartz, citing data from the analytics firm InfluencerDB, reported that Fashion Nova was the most-mentioned fashion brand on Instagram in the first half of that year. In August 2020, Fashion Nova announced reforms to its contracting practices in support of California's proposed bill, SB 1399, that includes a mandate that its contractors and subcontractors agree to random independent audits and that their workers are paid the applicable minimum wage, which in Los Angeles is scheduled to rise to $15 an hour for employers of all size in 2021. Fashion Nova also established a toll-free hotline for workers to report abuses as well as a system of penalties for those who violate its reform efforts. In October 2020, Fashion Nova launched Maven Beauty, an affordable beauty brand.

Founder Richard Saghian rarely speaks with reporters but is known to collect real estate, including The One, a mansion in Los Angeles. He has homes previously owned by Avicii and Netflix executive Ted Sarandos. Richard Saghian is of Iranian Jewish descent. He is not married and has no children.

== Collaborations ==
In November 2018, Fashion Nova released its line with rapper Cardi B. The collection launched at a "Party with Cardi" event, with performances by Cardi B, Saweetie, DreamDoll and Brianna Perry. The collection reportedly sold out shortly after its release. Since the collaboration, Fashion Nova has been endorsed by many celebrities and influencers including Teyana Taylor, Blac Chyna, and Christina Milian. The store has a seasonal Halloween costume line, with items debuting alongside its most popular ambassadors at Halloween events. Fashion Nova launched a second season of the Cardi B collection in May 2019, with performances by Cardi B, YG, Blueface, and Lil Nas X.

In April 2020, Fashion Nova launched Fashion Nova Cares, an initiative focused on supporting social causes. That same month, Fashion Nova Cares partnered with Cardi B to donate $1 million to those affected by COVID-19. In June 2020, Fashion Nova pledged to donate $1 million to a number of social justice organizations including Black Lives Matter, Know Your Rights Camp, and the NAACP Legal Defense and Education Fund. In November 2020, Fashion Nova released a line with Megan Thee Stallion, including statement pieces and an assortment of crafted denim for those 5 feet 9 inches (1.75 m) and taller. The collection reportedly generated $1.2 million in sales within 24 hours of the launch.

Megan Thee Stallion and Fashion Nova Cares partnered in March 2021 working with her Women on Top philanthropic initiative, which seeks to empower women by supporting educational and business endeavors with scholarships, grants, and donations. Daily throughout Women's History Month, Fashion Nova Cares provided $25,000 or more to female entrepreneurs, students, and women-focused charities. She also launched a swimwear line in June 2021.

== Controversy ==
In December 2019, the United States Department of Labor launched an investigation and found that some Fashion Nova suppliers or subcontractors hired workers who were paid as little as $2.77 an hour and that the suppliers owed $3.8 million in back wages to hundreds of workers. In October 2020, Playboy filed a complaint against Fashion Nova Inc. in Los Angeles, for its trademark rights with its Bunny costume. The Bunny mark contains the costume's "iconic bunny ears, tail, ribbon name tag, wrist cuffs, corset, and bowtie collar," according to the lawsuit. In 2021, Fashion Nova and Playboy reached a settlement agreement.

In January 2022, Fashion Nova settled with the Federal Trade Commission for $4.2 million after the company was found to have artificially inflated its ratings by deliberately blocking negative reviews on its site.
