= Beverly Drive station =

Future rapid transit station in Beverly Hills, California

Beverly Dr
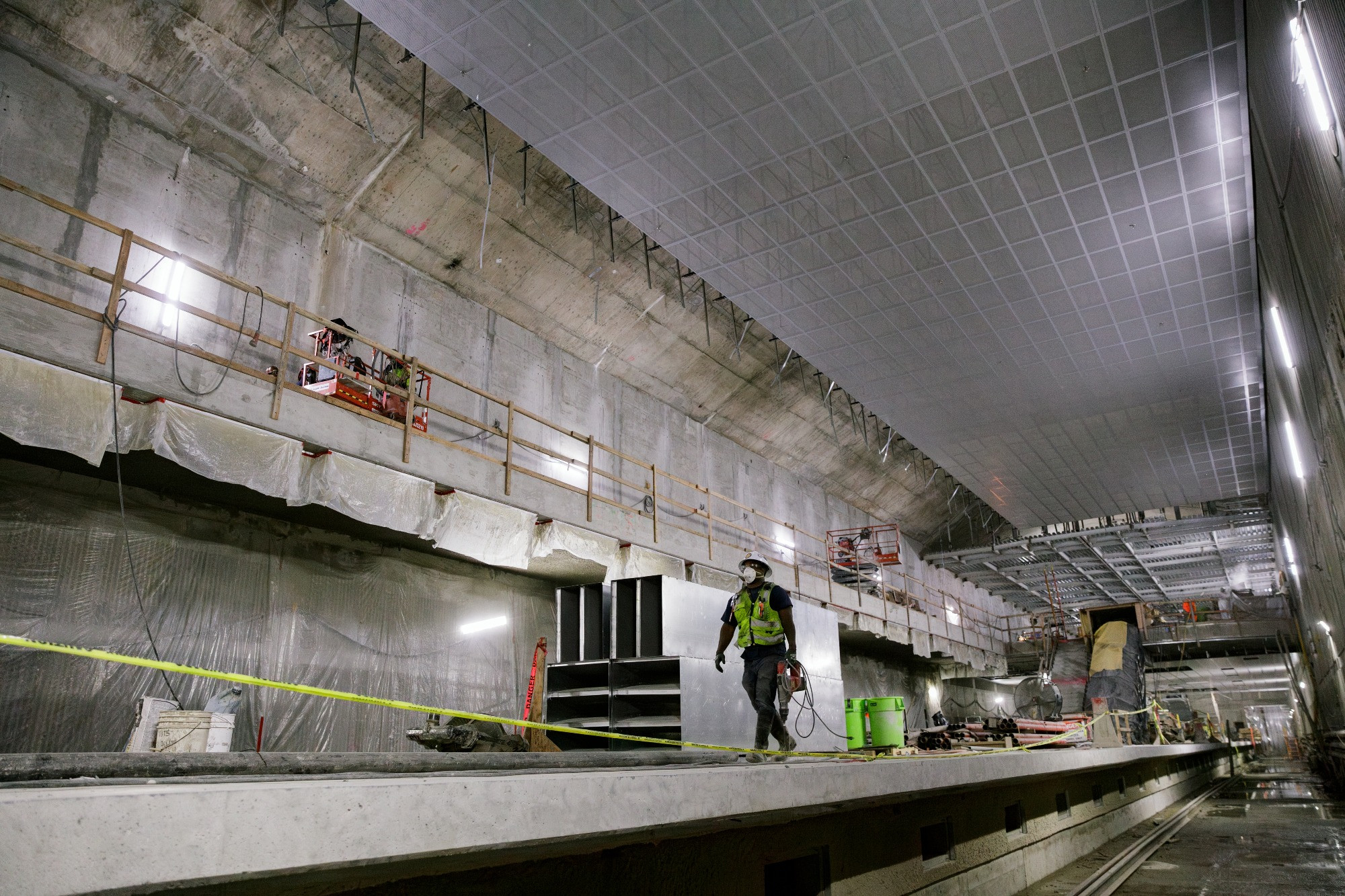
- Beverly Drive station under construction in July 2025

General information
- Location: Wilshire Boulevard and Beverly Drive; Beverly Hills, California
- Coordinates: 34°4′01″N 118°23′54″W
- Owner: Los Angeles Metro
- Platforms: 1 island platform
- Tracks: 2

Construction
- Accessible: Yes

Other information
- Status: Under construction

History
- Opening: 2027; 1 year's time

Future services
Preceding station	Metro Rail	Following station
Century City Terminus	D Line Extension Section 2	Wilshire/La Cienega toward Union Station
Location

Beverly Drive station is an under construction, underground rapid transit station on the D Line of the Los Angeles Metro Rail system. It is currently under construction as part of the D Line Extension project, in Beverly Hills, California. Construction started in 2018 as part of Section 2 of the extension project. It is slated to open in 2027.

The station is being built at the site of the former Ace Gallery on the south side of Wilshire Boulevard between Beverly Drive and Reeves Drive in Beverly Hills.

== History ==
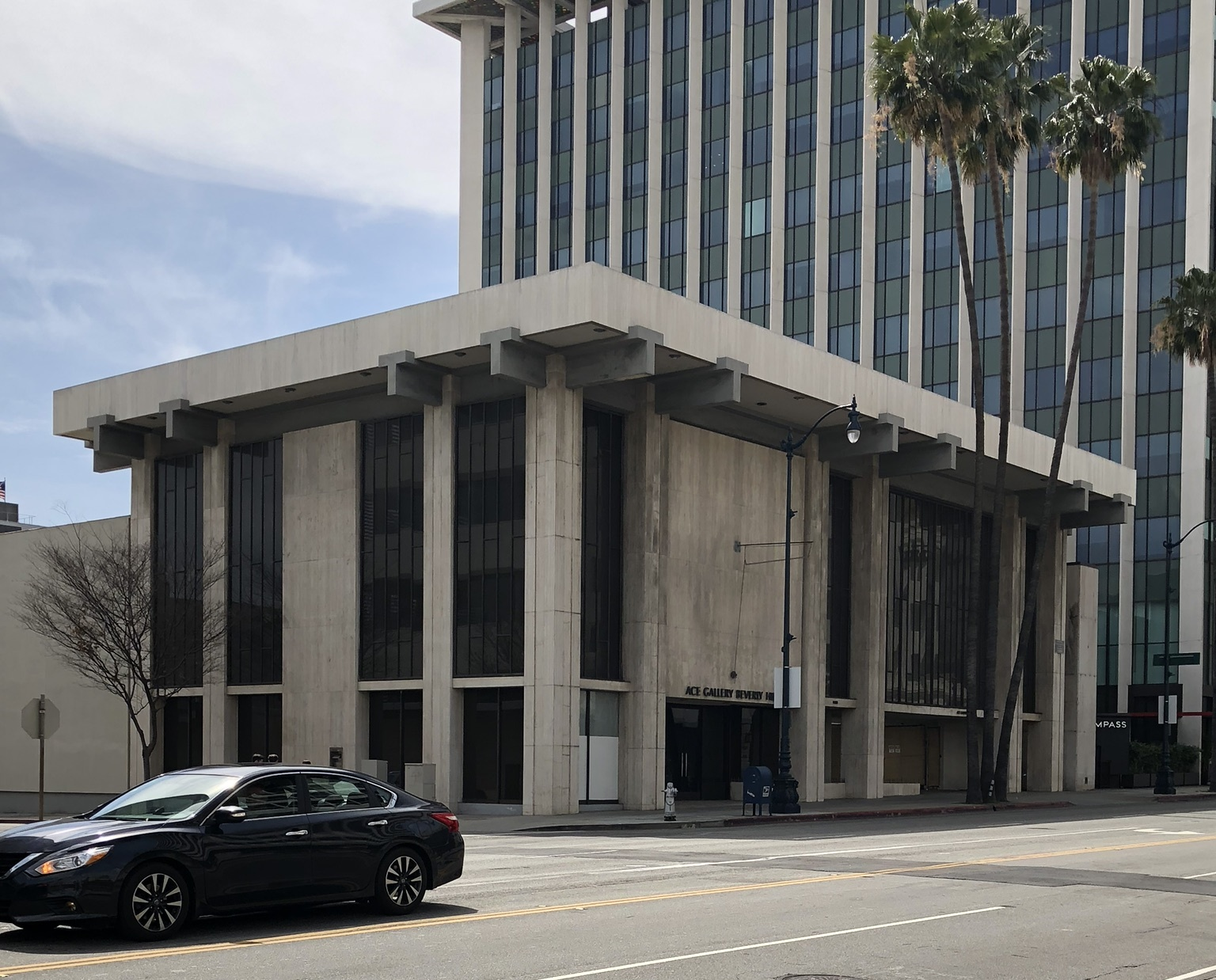
The former Ace Gallery, demolished in 2018 to build the Beverly Drive station

Construction of Beverly Drive station, known in planning as Wilshire/Rodeo station, was officially launched on September 23, 2019.

On March 31, 2020, the Beverly Hills city council approved a proposal from Los Angeles Metro to fully close the two blocks of Wilshire Boulevard needed to facilitate the station's construction, taking advantage of lower traffic levels resulting from the COVID-19 pandemic in California. This would allow for expedited construction of the station and better mitigation of construction impacts as opposed to the original plan, which would require alternating weekend closures for 13 weeks over a 3.5-month period, with completion scheduled for March 2021. Fully closing Wilshire Boulevard, which went into effect the next day and lasted until June 2020, expedited construction of the station by as much as six months.

Metro officially completed foundation and decking work for Beverly Drive station seven months ahead of schedule on June 14, 2020, with Tutor Perini, the project's general contractor, putting workers on extra shifts to further expedite construction. Wilshire Boulevard reopened in both directions later that evening, with construction and excavation activities continuing underground until that phase's scheduled completion in the first quarter of 2021.

As part of a memorandum of agreement (MOA) signed between Metro and the city of Beverly Hills in 2018 for Section 2 of the D Line Extension, Metro agreed to not permanently name the station without the consent of the city. From September 2022 to July 2023, Metro and the city of Beverly Hills solicited public suggestions for a permanent name for the station, with "Wilshire/Beverly Drive" emerging as the most popular choice. Following additional surveying of local businesses from August 17, 2023 to September 1, 2023, representatives of the Beverly Wilshire Hotel opposed the name based on concerns that the similar name of the station could negatively impact the hotel's Google Search results from potential negative coverage of the station and thus damage its brand and reputation. At its regular meeting on October 3, 2023, the Beverly Hills city council would instead approve "Beverly Drive" as a compromise. Metro's Executive Management Committee would approve the name "Beverly Drive" at its meeting on May 15, 2025, where it would go on to be approved by Metro's board of directors at its meeting on May 22, 2025.

== Station layout ==
Beverly Drive station was originally planned with a single entrance, located at the southwest corner of Wilshire Boulevard and Reeves Drive. However, as part of an agreement Metro negotiated with the city of Beverly Hills which was approved on February 28, 2019, a second entrance is being planned on the northern side of Wilshire Boulevard, with three locations being originally considered.

During a Beverly Hills community meeting held on June 7, 2023, it was announced a location for the second entrance was decided by the Beverly Hills city council at the northwest corner of Wilshire Boulevard and Beverly Drive, adjacent to the Wilshire Beverly Center office complex. The second entrance would consist of a street-level glass-enclosed entryway like those on the K Line and the Regional Connector. It would possess a single up escalator and a set of stairs leading into a 170-foot-long (52 m) tunnel which would feed into the station's concourse level. Per a staff report, the total cost of the north portal was expected to be $134.2 million, and the agreement between Metro and the city of Beverly Hills would have them split the cost of the new portal up to the original estimated budget of $78.5 million. However, the two entities are expected to negotiate the split of any amount beyond that original estimate. As a result, the Beverly Hills city council will be required to decide on whether or not to move forward with or cancel the second entrance, with the city possibly deciding to reallocate existing funding to other projects such as first/last mile improvements at transit stations. On May 8, 2024, Beverly Hills chose to not build the second entrance citing high costs, though Metro plans to build provisions for a future second entrance within Beverly Drive's station box.

The station may be one of the only stations in the Metro Rail system (aside from Union Station and the LAX/Metro Transit Center) to have public toilets, which will likely be built after the station opens, and may be built above-ground and/or integrated into a new development which would be built above the station.

== Attractions ==
- The station is located in the Platinum Triangle neighborhood that includes the Rodeo Drive shopping district and its many hotels, including the Luxe Rodeo Drive Hotel, the Beverly Wilshire Hotel, The Beverly Hilton, the under construction One Beverly Hills, the Waldorf-Astoria and The Peninsula Beverly Hills hotels.
- Beverly Gardens Park and its Electric Fountain, Beverly Cañon Gardens plaza park and Reeves Park.
- Various fine dining establishments are located in the neighborhood, including Spago, which is directly across the street.
- The Academy Headquarters Building along with its Samuel Goldwyn Theater, the Paley Center for Media, the Wallis Annenberg Center for the Performing Arts are located nearby, Lumiere Music Hall and the Writers Guild Theater.
- The Rodeo Drive Walk of Style aligns Rodeo Drive.
- Consulate General of Kuwait and Qatar.
