= Temescal Canyon =

Temescal Canyon may refer to:

- Temescal Canyon, Los Angeles County, California
- Temescal Canyon, Riverside County, California

== See also ==
- Temescal Creek (disambiguation)
