= Community United Methodist Church of Pacific Palisades =

United Methodist church in Los Angeles, California

Community United Methodist Church
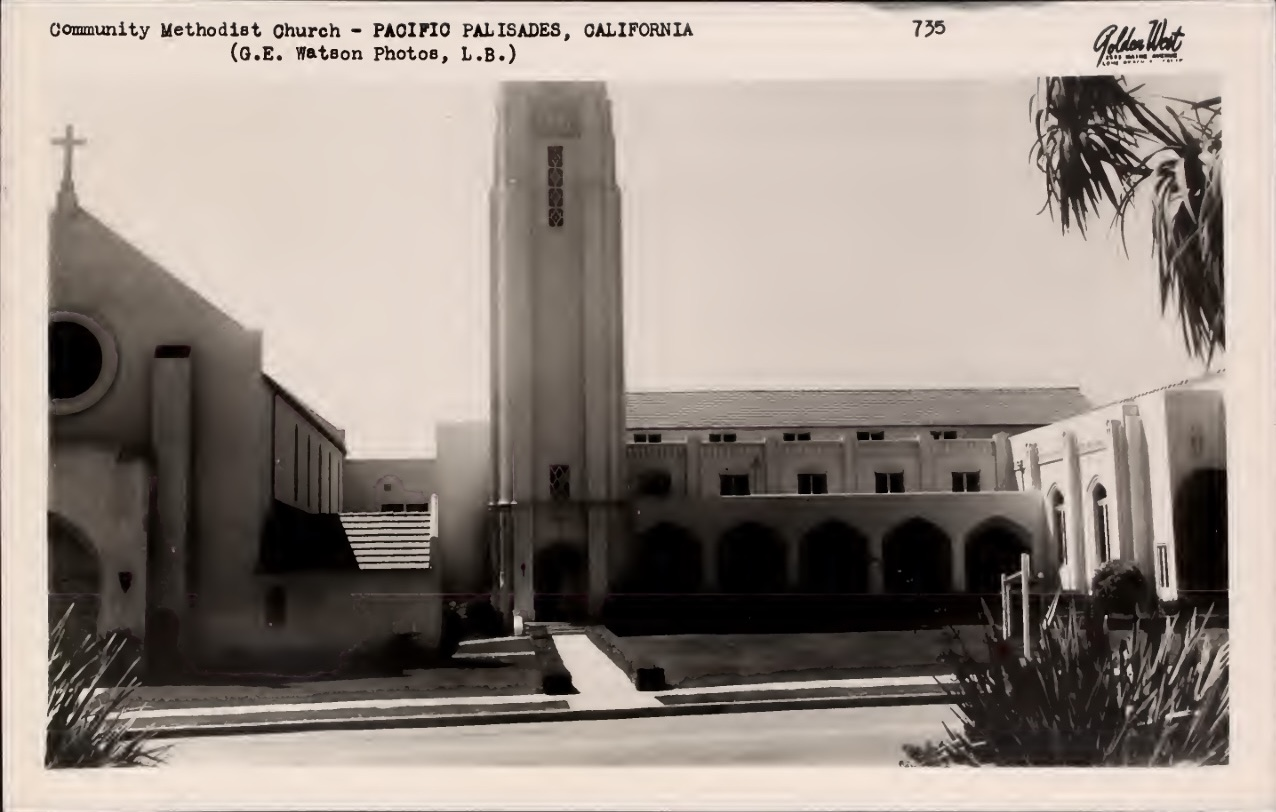
- Pacific Palisades Community Methodist Church, Via de la Paz, c. 1955 (Princeton Theological Seminary Digital Commons)
- Location: 801 Via de la Paz; Pacific Palisades, Los Angeles, California, U.S.
- Denomination: United Methodist Church
- Website: palisadesmethodist.org

Architecture
- Groundbreaking: August 18, 1929

Community United Methodist Church of Pacific Palisades is a United Methodist church in the Pacific Palisades neighborhood of Los Angeles, California. The community of Pacific Palisades was laid out as a result of Methodist church planters selecting an area on the bluffs north of Santa Monica as the location of their new Southern California camp meeting, inspired by the Chautauqua movement. The congregation initially worshipped in tents set up in Temescal Canyon. The first Community Methodist church building was dedicated in 1930, with substantial expansions in 1952 and the late 1960s. The church was badly damaged during the Palisades Fire on January 8, 2025.

== History ==
=== The Methodist origins of Pacific Palisades ===
Community Methodist was the first house of worship established in what is Pacific Palisades, by Methodist missionary settlers who simultaneously founded and named Pacific Palisades. The Palisades is unusual amongst west Los Angeles communities in that it "was not founded as a speculative enterprise promoted by subdividers, but by a need for more space in which to carry on [a] program of religious education" and as a permanent site of the Chautauqua movement in Southern California. The location also suited the founders' plans for a beach resort especially for Methodists. As with other Chautauqua sites, it would offer lectures, performances, and religious services in a scenic, camp-like setting, and "expected to become the world's greatest Christian Resort and Assembly Center."

The church was founded in 1922 under the oversight of Rev. Marle Smith of Pasadena, who sought a new "assembly area" for the church that could support a summer camp and a youth institute. The Pacific Palisades community was the successor to a Methodist church and community center called Alomar in Huntington Beach; in 1920, after a six-year search "they reported that a great assembly area modeled after that at Ocean Grove, New Jersey, was needed. In May of the following year 1,100 acres in the Santa Monica area were purchased for $660 an acre. The Pacific Palisades Association was organized." The Huntington Beach location was sold—apparently the discovery and development of the Huntington Beach Oil Field nearby created both an unpleasant place to worship and a good opportunity to sell real estate. The proceeds from the sale of Alomar bought the bluffs from the Santa Monica Land and Water Company, the church conference set aside "certain space" for "institutional purposes," and the remainder was subdivided for sale. From 1922 until 1929, congregants worshipped at a tent camp in Temescal Canyon and then in the Pacific Palisades Association building. Another one of the Methodist institutions established, circa 1921, was the Pacific Palisades Rest Home Society, a retirement home for deacons and deaconesses, an institution that was later relocated to Alhambra. Brush fires in Topanga threatened the Pacific Palisades project in 1924.

Unfortunately for investors, the lots held by the Pacific Palisades Association did not sell rapidly, interest accrued, additional purchases added to the debt, and then the Great Depression was on, such that by 1934, "foreclosure to the bondholders was recorded."

=== The Community Methodist Church building ===
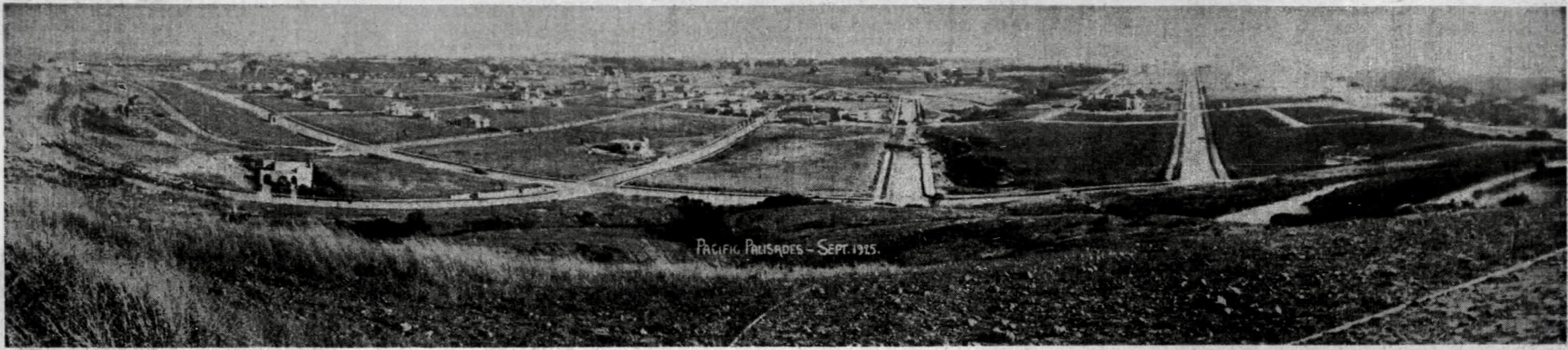
Pacific Palisades, September 1925: A panoramic view of the Methodist Church land holdings on the bluffs below Santa Monica

The church proper was built on a 1.5-acre site donated by the Southern California Methodist Conference, and the original sanctuary building cost $35,000. The groundbreaking for the original church building on Via de la Paz took place on August 18, 1929. There were 73 charter members in the founding congregation. A new sanctuary hall was built in 1952, and the original building became the Fellowship Hall and the Sunday school. In the 1960s, the church supported the establishment of the North Redondo United Methodist Church in Redondo Beach, California. By 1967, the church had 700 members and fundraising was underway for the construction of new offices, a sanctuary annex, a smaller chapel, a bride's room, and more classrooms.

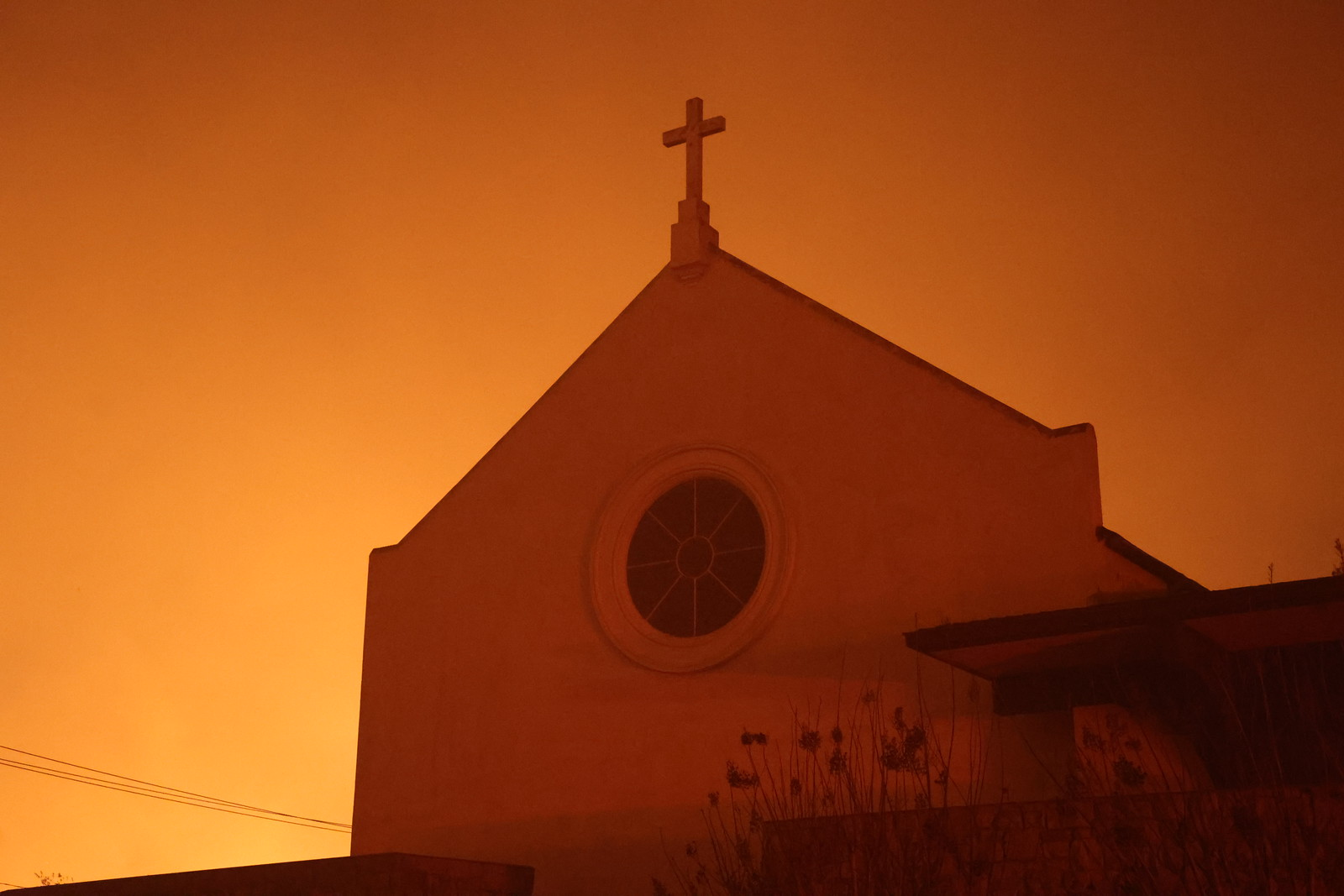
The church on January 8, 2025, just before catching on fire

The church has been used as a filming location for multiple TV series: in August 2016 an episode of Jane the Virgin was filmed there; and in October 2016 an episode of the sixth season of New Girl turned the church into a school.

On January 8, 2025, the church was heavily damaged during the Palisades Fire. Bishop Dottie Escobedo-Frank released a video statement confirming the church was on fire and asked parishioners within the California-Pacific Annual Conference to pray for the congregation.

== Additional images ==
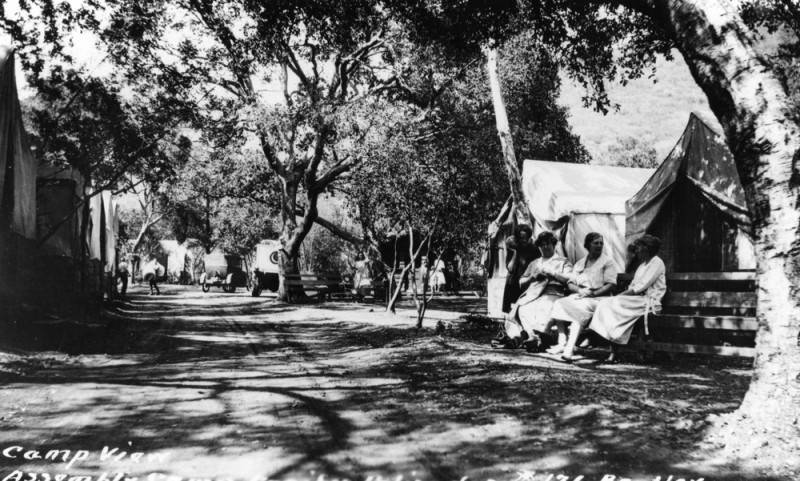
View of the grounds of the Methodist camp meeting site in Pacific Palisades; this location is now Temescal Gateway Park (Security National Pacific Bank photo collection, Los Angeles Public Library)

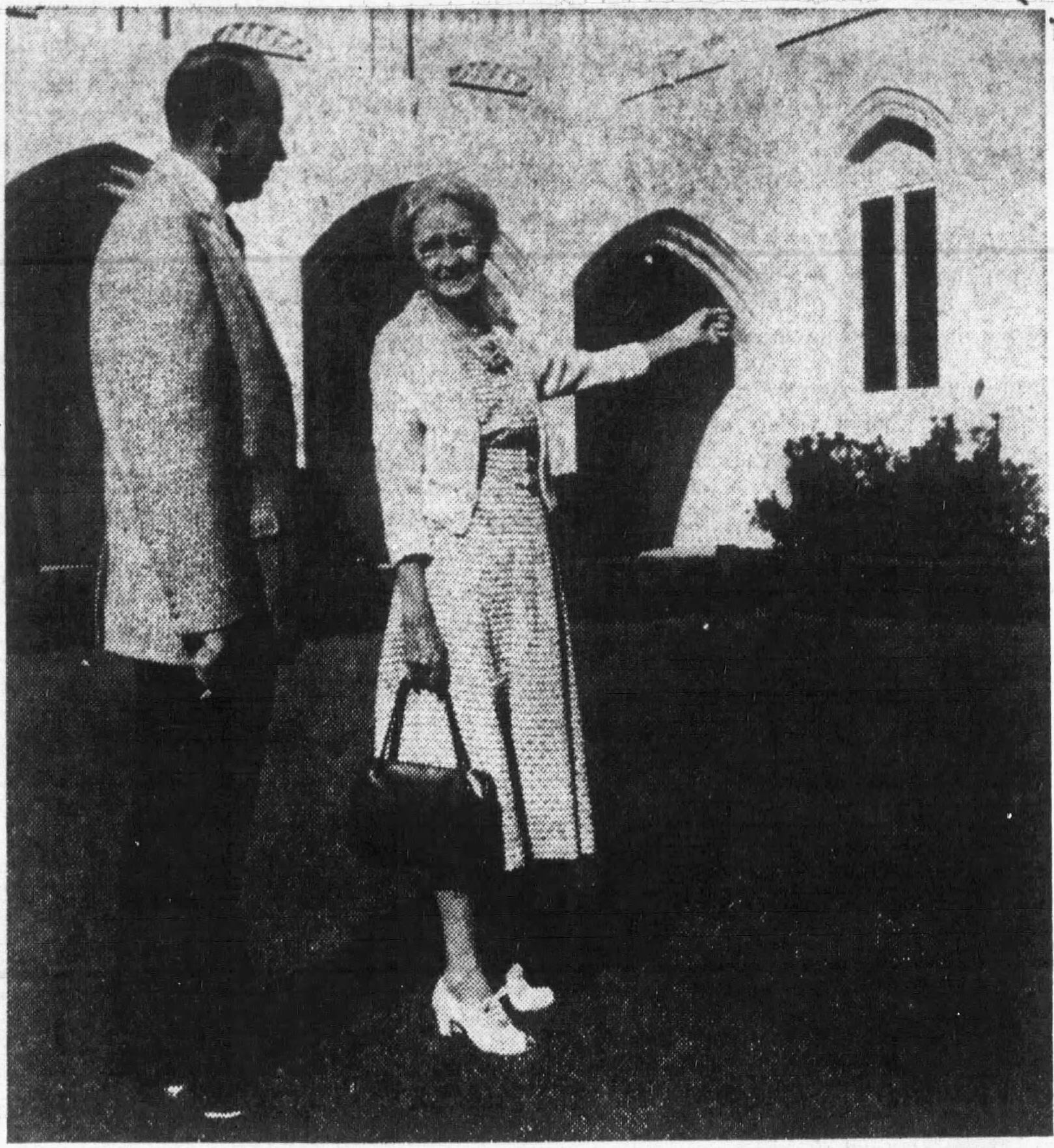
A founding member of the church points out a feature of the original section of the church building (The Roberts News, 1959)

== See also ==
- Corpus Christi Catholic Church, Pacific Palisades
