= Coldwater Canyon Avenue =

Street in Los Angeles County, California, US

Coldwater Canyon
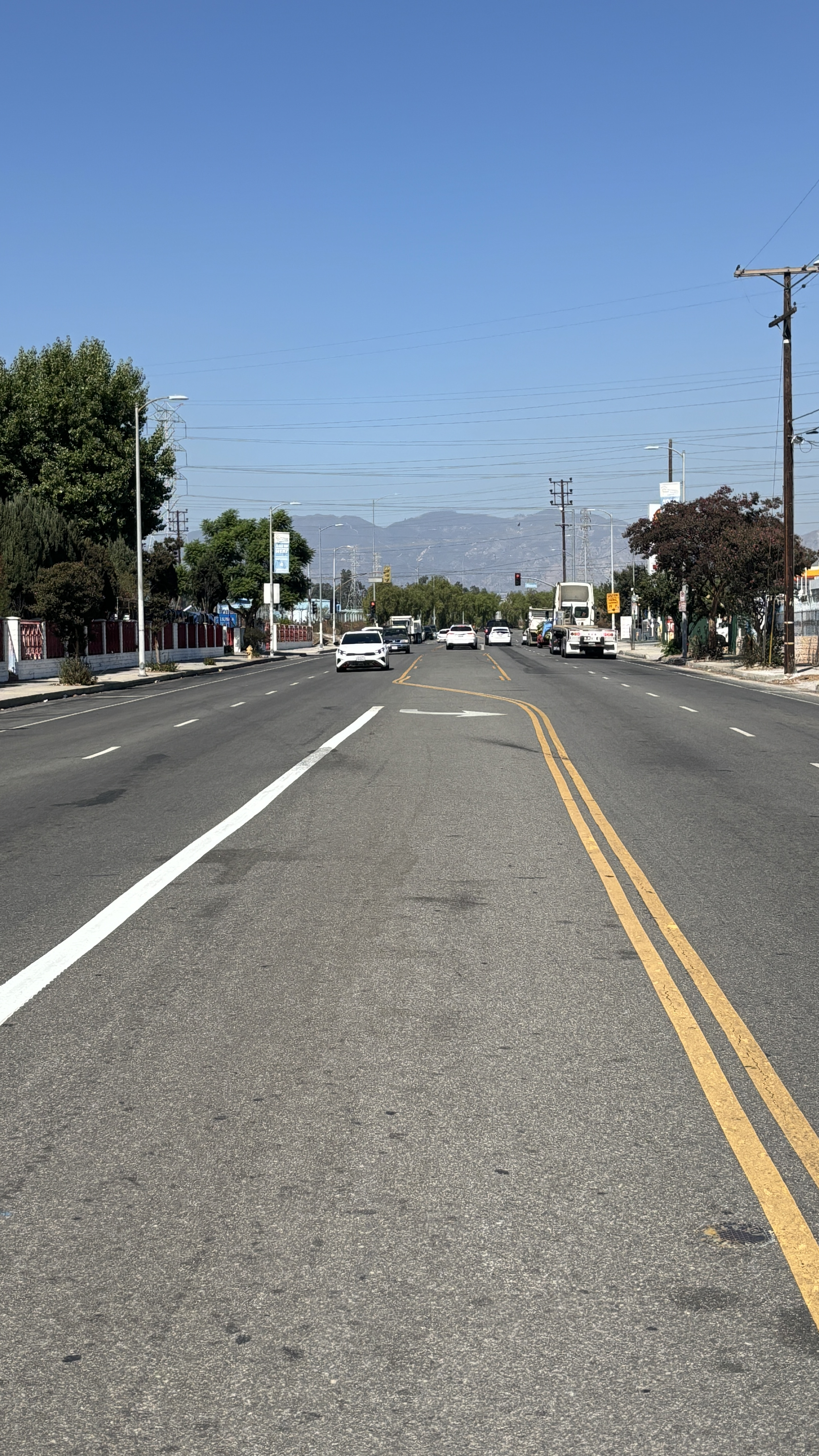
- Coldwater Canyon Avenue, 2024
- Interactive map of Coldwater Canyon
- Maintained by: City of Los Angeles Department of Public Works
- Length: 10.3 mi (16.6 km)
- South end: North Beverly Drive in Beverly Hills
- Major junctions: US 101 in Sherman Oaks
- North end: Roscoe Boulevard in Sun Valley

Coldwater Canyon Avenue (designated as Coldwater Canyon Drive south of Mulholland Drive) is a street, primarily within the City of Los Angeles, in Los Angeles County, California. It runs 10.3 miles (16.6 km) from North Beverly Drive at Coldwater Canyon Park in Beverly Hills, north up Coldwater Canyon, including a short stretch shared with Mulholland Drive, ending at a crossroad intersection with Roscoe Boulevard in Sun Valley, where the Coldwater Canyon Avenue changes into Sheldon Street.

== Name ==
Coldwater Canyon Avenue was named after Coldwater Canyon, the canyon the road traverses. The street of the street north of the canyon (in the San Fernando Valley) was named Diaz Avenue until 1937.

== Route ==
Coldwater Canyon Avenue begins at a Y intersection with North Beverly Drive in Beverly Hills in the Westside region of Los Angeles. It then heads north within the canyon of the same name, running perpendicular to and then over the central Santa Monica Mountains, then descends into the eastern portion of the San Fernando Valley, continuing through that valley to Roscoe Boulevard. It parallels Laurel Canyon Boulevard for its entire length. Communities it passes through include Beverly Hills, Sherman Oaks, Valley Glen and Van Nuys. When passing through the Studio City community of Los Angeles, Coldwater Canyon Avenue crosses the main Los Angeles River, then runs along the west side of the north–south fork of Tujunga Wash, before crossing the wash to its east side, as the road continues north through the Valley Glen community. Coldwater Canyon Avenue continues north, parallel but at a steadily greater distance from Tujunga Wash. Coldwater Canyon Avenue moves closer to the east side of Tujunga Wash just before becoming the northeasterly Sheldon Street at a crossroad intersection with Roscoe Boulevard, in the western portion of the Sun Valley community of Los Angeles.

Coldwater Canyon Avenue is a busy thoroughfare, particularly as it winds through, and over, the Santa Monica Mountains between Beverly Hills and the San Fernando Valley. In this specific area, the neighborhoods are highly affluent.

== Transportation ==
Metro Local line 167 services Coldwater Canyon Avenue between Roscoe Boulevard and Ventura Boulevard.

Los Angeles Valley College and the adjacent Metro G Line station are located on Burbank Boulevard and Fulton Avenue, placed two long blocks west of Coldwater Canyon Avenue.

== Features ==
- Franklin Canyon Park
- Harvard-Westlake School
- Los Angeles Valley College
- Wilacre Park

== See also ==
- Coldwater Canyon
- Streets in Los Angeles
- Streets in Los Angeles County, California
