= Benedict Canyon, Los Angeles =

Benedict Canyon
- Neighborhood of Los Angeles
- Location within Western Los Angeles
- Coordinates: 34.097789°N 118.430706°W
- Country: United States
- State: California
- County: Los Angeles
- City: Los Angeles
- Time zone: UTC-8 (PST)
  - Summer (DST): UTC-7 (PDT)

Benedict Canyon is an area in the Westside of the city of Los Angeles, California.

To the north of the Benedict Canyon neighborhood is the neighborhood of Sherman Oaks, to the west is the neighborhood of Beverly Glen, to the east are Beverly Park and Franklin Canyon, and to the south is the city of Beverly Hills.

== Geography ==
Benedict Canyon is a ravine that drops in a north-to-south direction from its high point at the crest line in the Santa Monica Mountains; to the east of the Canyon are its two sisters, Franklin Canyon and Coldwater Canyon. Rainwater percolating over the ancient strata of all three canyons emerges at their lowest altitude as the springs feeding Franklin's Lake and Creek. A cross-section of the land reveals granite of volcanic origin, layered between worn river rocks and ocean-bottom mud.

In upper Benedict Canyon are the subdivisions of Benedict Hills, which consists of 107 homes, and Benedict Hills Estates, which consists of 229 homes between Deep Canyon and Mulholland Drive, just east of Hutton.

== History ==
Benedict Canyon was a part of Rancho de las Aguas ("Ranch of the Waters"), which also included present-day Beverly Hills. It was named by Edson A. Benedict, a storekeeper and native of Boonville, Missouri, who took a homestead in the Canyon in 1868. With help from his wife and sons, E. A. Benedict built an apiary that was so bountiful that in one year, they were reported to have made a single shipment of 45,000 pounds (20,000 kg) of honey from Santa Monica Pier. One of Mr. Benedict's sons, Pierce E. Benedict, later went on to be elected to the city of Beverly Hills Board of Trustees at the time of its incorporation.

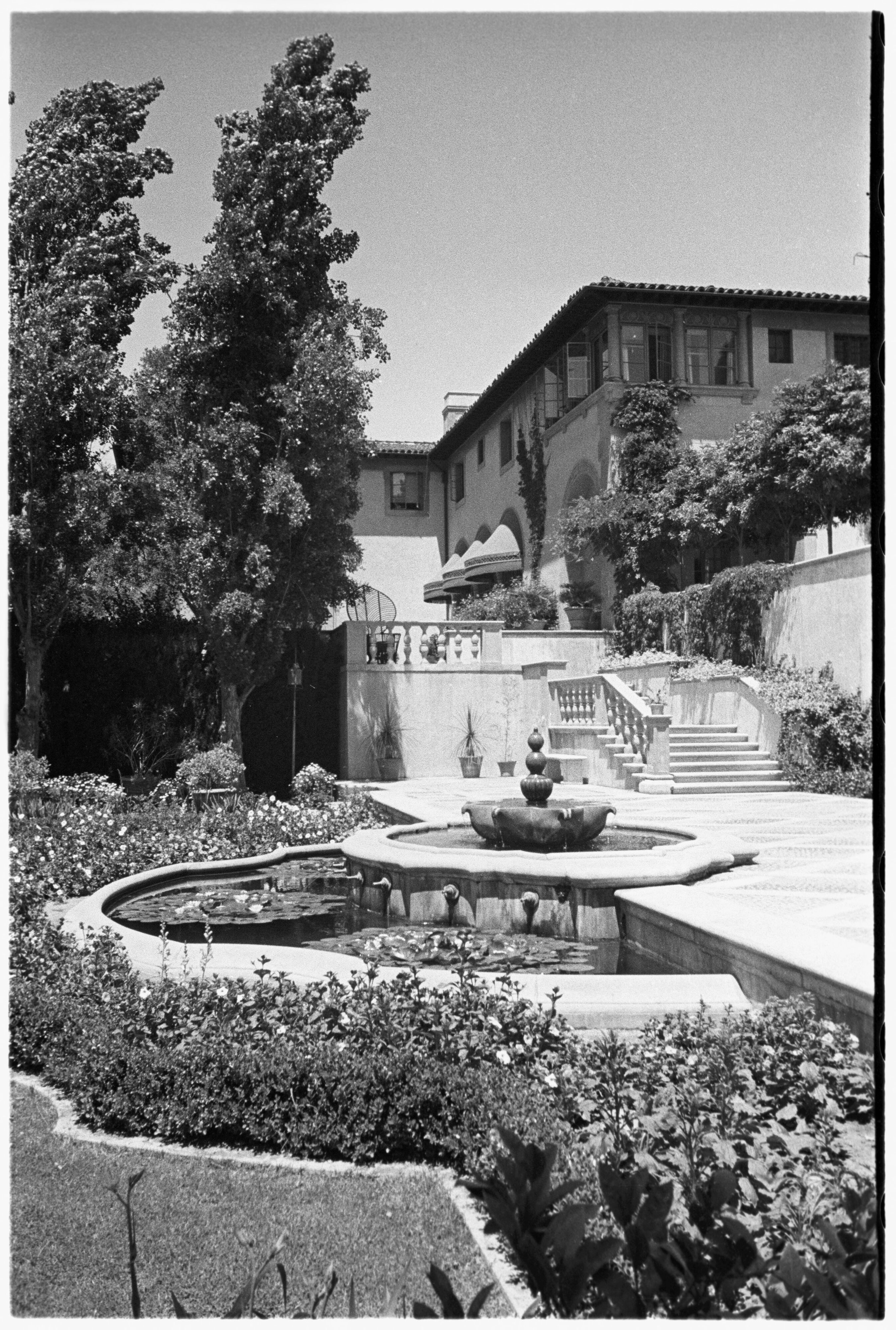
Fountain on the estate of film comedian Harold Lloyd and his wife Mildred, Beverly Hills, c.1927

In 1923, silent film star Harold Lloyd purchased 15.7 acres at the southern mouth of the canyon from P.E. Benedict for $100,000. Lloyd built a 44-room mansion on the site that would become known as Greenacres, and helped establish Benedict Canyon as a desirable address. Upon its completion in 1929, Greenacres had a private 9-hole golf course, one of the largest pools in the western US, and a miniature English village built for Lloyd's daughter, Gloria. After Harold Lloyd's death in 1971, the property was left to his family, but mounting debt and a delinquency on the promissory note led City National Bank to foreclose on it by the end of 1974. Proceedings were paused as the Beverly Hills city council considered acquiring the grounds and establishing it as a film museum, but the plan was ultimately abandoned due in part to the $700,000 cost of paying off the accrued debts, an additional $180,000 needed to collect various artifacts for the museum, $500,000 to redevelop the site, and roughly $100,000 a year in maintenance costs, all of which would defer city funds for other projects. The bank then completed its repossession of Greenacres and put it up for auction in the summer of 1975 with an estimated value between $1.2 million and $1.6 million. Nasrollah Afshani, a retired Iranian businessman and Beverly Hills resident, bought the estate for $1.6 million telling the Los Angeles Times that he was "looking at property, shopping centers, to buy". Afshani kept the main house and the 5 acres surrounding it intact, resold it, and in 1984, it became listed on the National Register of Historic Places. Meanwhile, Afshani subdivided the remaining 10 acres into 15 lots that he sold for over $1 million each.

In August 1969, the Tate murders took place in Cielo Drive. Sharon Tate, Roman Polanski's pregnant wife, and four others were killed by members of the Manson Family at the couple's 10050 Cielo Drive home. The place was later renamed 10066 Cielo Drive, and ultimately the house was razed, and another erected in its place.

Author and LSD enthusiast Timothy Leary spent the last years of his life in a house in Benedict Canyon, where he died in 1996.

Sunset

== Residences ==
Homes range from smaller one-story family residences to large properties. Homes are predominantly single-family and owner-occupied and have two or more bedrooms. The median year in which the homes were built is 1960.

In 2000, Benedict Canyon homeowners won a legal battle against the City of Los Angeles over the latter relaxing height requirements to allow a 45,000-square-foot villa that Mark R. Hughes had hoped to build on the area’s highest peak.

== Vegetation and plants ==
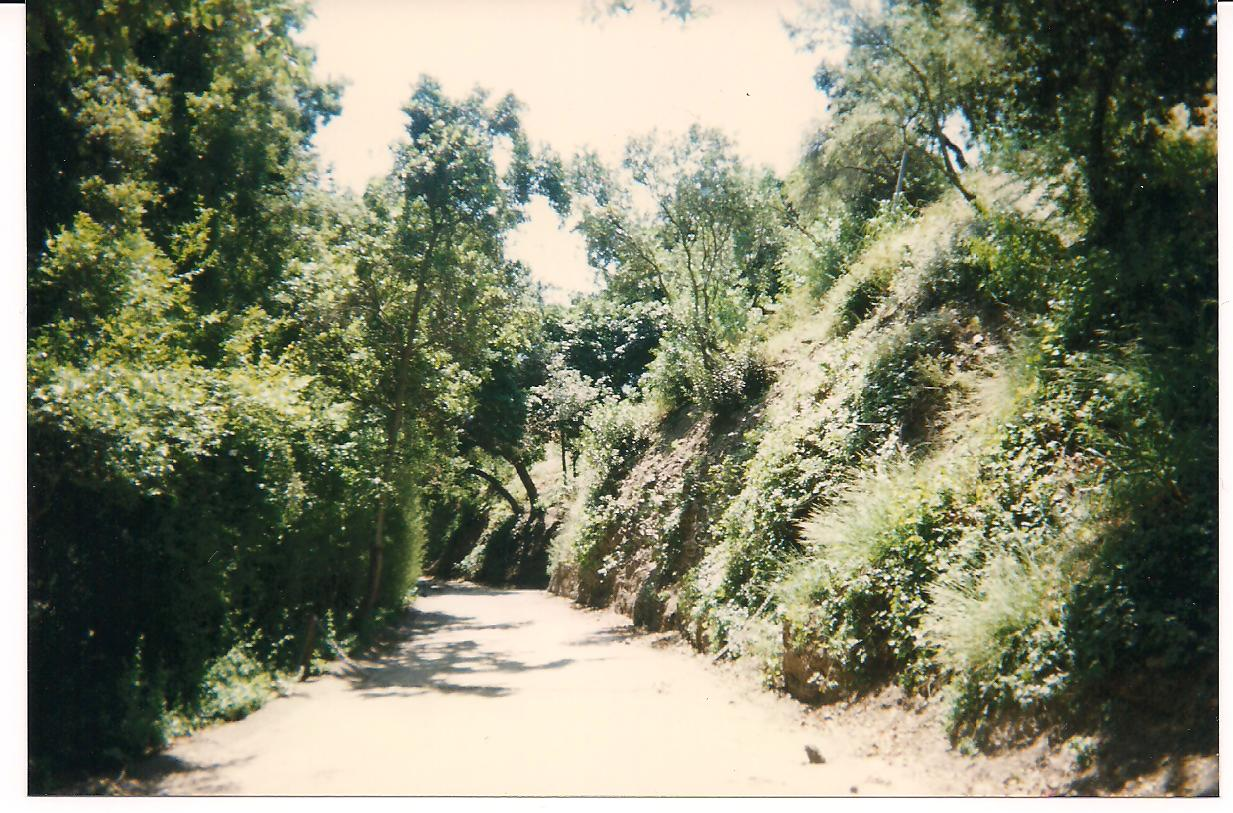
Cielo Drive in Benedict Canyon

Benedict Canyon has a mix of vegetation and growth that is endemic to Southern California: oaks and grasses on the lower slopes, and chaparral and lupine on the higher hillsides. Along nearby Franklin's Creek can be found sycamores, ferns and vines. Evergreens, such as pines, cypresses, deodars and eucalyptus, were planted as settlers moved in, and built homes and parks. Vegetation types within the Santa Monica Mountains range from moist coastal canyon bottoms in the Santa Monica Mountains, to desert transitional areas at the headwaters of the Santa Clara River. With the exception of the areas that border the Mojave Desert, all of the vegetation within the zone is influenced by the effects of the Pacific Ocean. The resulting cool, wet winters and hot, dry summers create a Mediterranean-type ecosystem.

By far, the dominant vegetation sub-type is chaparral. Chaparral is composed of drought- and fire-tolerant evergreen shrubs that range in height from four to ten feet. Unless recently subjected to fire, or some other type of disturbance, this plant community is generally too dense to penetrate. Another unique shrub community to Southern California is sage scrub, which varies between coastal and inland types. Sage scrub vegetation contains fewer stout, woody shrubs, and more openings with fine, delicate plants. The expansive valley floors between the mountain ranges were plowed and farmed long ago. They are now entirely developed. The precise former native plant cover of the San Fernando, Simi and Santa Clarita Valleys was never adequately recorded. It is suspected that native perennial bunch grasses were dominant elements. Throughout the zone, over ninety-five percent of the native grasslands have been displaced by foreign invasive plants. The most common riparian (stream-related) woodland species are various willows, coast live oak, California sycamore, and Fremont's cottonwood. Less common species that are relics of the last ice age include white alder, bigleaf maple, and black cottonwood. On slopes, and in valleys where rainfall concentrates, groves of evergreen coast live oaks are common throughout Benedict Canyon. These evergreen oaks provide food and shelter for numerous species of wildlife. Deeper soiled areas in the Santa Susana Mountains, the Simi Hills and the Santa Monica Mountains support the deciduous valley oak. A widely dispersed tree in the Santa Monica Mountains, and to a lesser extent in other ranges, is the California black walnut.

== Wildlife ==
The animal population is pretty much the same as it was 10,000 years ago. Grizzly bears are an exception, as they were killed off by early settlers of the area. The most common medium-sized and large mammals are coyotes, mule deer, bobcats, raccoons, and skunks. Just away from the urban edge, other predators, such as grey fox, mountain lion, American badger, long-tailed weasel, and ringtailed cat, occupy various niches. The ecosystem's top predator, the mountain lion, is present everywhere except the fragmented eastern end of the Santa Monica Mountains that bisects the Los Angeles metropolitan area. Because they fear humans, however, they are rarely seen. Also, there are numerous prey species — such as rabbits, squirrels, rats, mice, and other rodents. Seven species of hawks, eight species of owls, peregrine falcons, golden eagles, northern harriers, American kestrels, and white-tailed kite share in this bounty of prey.

Benedict Canyon is also part of the Pacific Flyway. As a result, the resident Southern California bird species often share company with neo-tropical migrants and other species, such as Canada geese. There are over eighteen species of snakes and eight species of lizards. The most common snakes are pacific rattlesnake, gopher snake, California king snake, and California striped racer. The rattlesnake is the only venomous snake in California. They seek shade during the hottest summer afternoons and hibernate during the winter. The zone supports five species of frogs, three species of toads, and five species of newts and salamanders. As in most parts of the world, frog populations have declined, probably due to climate change and pollution. The widely scattered perennial streams still support unique populations of native fish. Topanga and Malibu Creeks contain tidewater gobies, arroyo chub, and the endangered Southern California Distinct Population Segment of steelhead. The Santa Clara River supports these species as well as the federally listed endangered, unarmored three spine stickleback. Some of the upper reaches of the Los Angeles River at the foot of the San Gabriel Mountains harbor populations of the Santa Ana sucker and speckled dace.

== Community ==
The Benedict Canyon Association (BCA), started in 1948, is an example of neighborhood activism. The BCA is dedicated to preserving the beauty, safety, environment and quality of life in the Canyon. Because of their early efforts, Benedict Canyon remains the only canyon that is 100% residential.

The Hillside Ordinance to limit building height at 36 feet (11 m) and stipulate restrictions on set-back, side yards or parking, was a product of Association lobbying and participation. That ordinance was also the basis of the recent defeat of the proposed villa on top of the Mark Hughes hilltop, an event cheered by many residents.

Current and past beautification projects of the Association include the repair and repaving of roads, repainting of guardrails, repair of Upper Benedict Canyon, and a subsidized monthly service of clearing debris and trimming vegetation that spills on the roadway.

"Adopt Fire Station 99" is another community grass-roots organization representing about 9,000 residents in the Mulholland-Benedict Canyon area. Going hand-in-hand with the BCA, residents helped to generate the media attention, popular support, and political will that defeated the city's plan to reduce from two to one the number of paramedics available at each Fire Station to deliver emergency care.

== Celebrities ==
A number of notable people live or have lived in Benedict Canyon. Some of them are:

- Fred Astaire
- John Barrymore
- David Beckham
- Susan Berman
- Jacqueline Bisset
- Orlando Bloom
- Adrien Brody
- Ron Burkle
- Gerard Butler
- Timothée Chalamet
- Mike Farrell
- Cary Grant
- Jimi Hendrix
- Thomas H. Ince
- Danny Kaye
- Kirk Kerkorian
- Robby Krieger
- Jack Lemmon
- Lisa Kudrow
- Mila Kunis
- Ashton Kutcher
- John Legend
- Jay Leno
- Harold Lloyd
- Jon Lovitz
- Demi Moore
- Phil McGraw
- Rupert Murdoch
- Roman Polanski
- George Reeves
- Emmy Rossum
- Tom Snyder
- Bruce Springsteen
- Sharon Tate
- Channing Tatum
- Kate Upton
- Rudolph Valentino
- Yvette Vickers
- Jon Voight

== Fire danger ==
Bottlenecks on the neighborhood's narrow canyon roads have been noted as a primary concern. As part of the plan, the Department of Transportation tows away cars that are parked illegally on narrow hillside streets on "red flag days," when fire danger is high. When fire conditions reach the critical red flag level — 25 mph (40 km/h) wind and relative humidity below 15% — illegally parked vehicles that restrict access are ticketed and towed. Fire departments notify residents by raising red flags over the 103 fire stations in Los Angeles. Over the last ten-plus years (2015), the maximum number of Red Flag days per year was 12. The normal range is between four and seven days per year.

Brush clearance is a year-round responsibility for those homeowners living in Benedict Canyon. Fire officials said that both the foliage and the lack of recent fires in the area are cause for concern, not comfort, noting the Oakland Hills fire of October 1991 that killed 25 and destroyed 3,276 residences under similar conditions.

== Emergency services ==
The Los Angeles Police Department operates the West Los Angeles Community Police Station at 1663 Butler Avenue, 90025, serving the neighborhood.

The Los Angeles Fire Department serves the area of Benedict Canyon. Fire Station 71 and Fire Station 99 serve the Benedict Canyon Area.

== Education ==
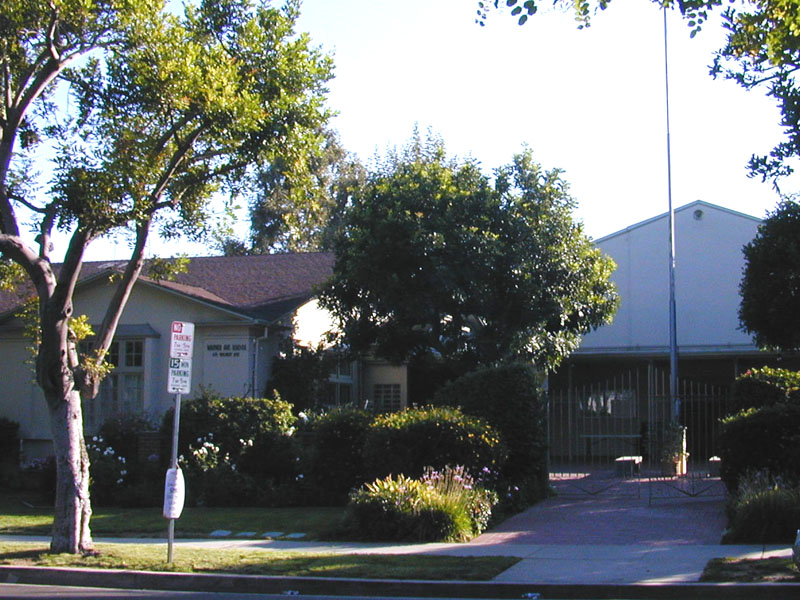
Warner Avenue School

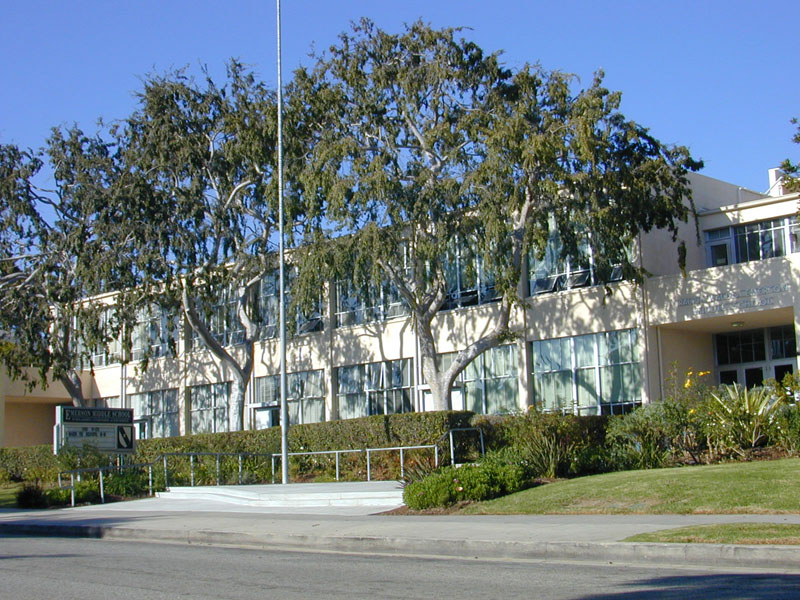
Emerson Middle School

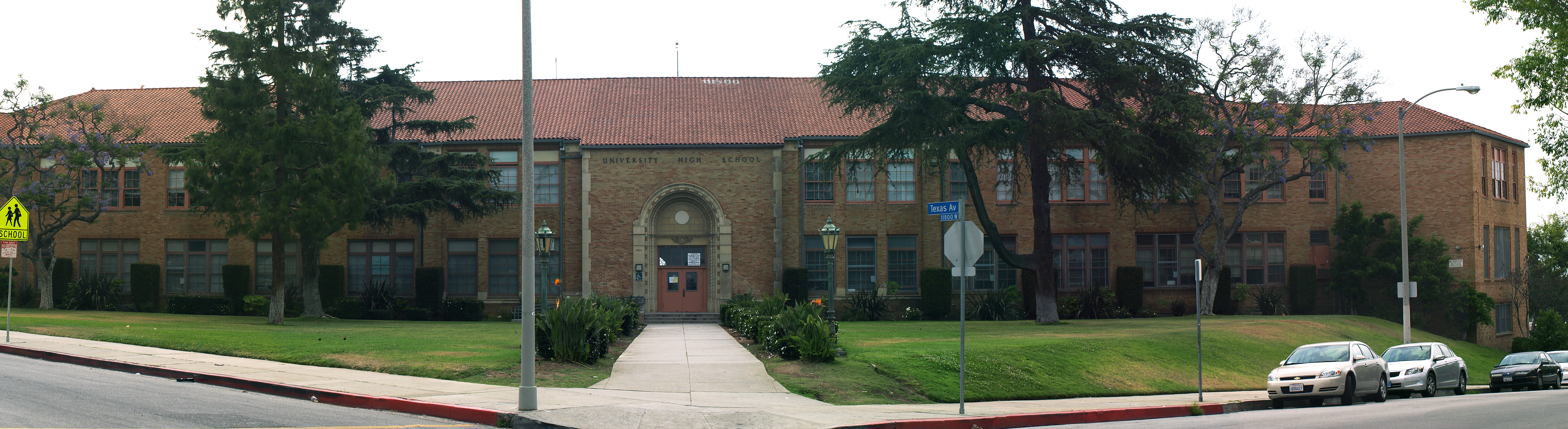
University High School

Residents are assigned to schools in the Los Angeles Unified School District:

- Warner Avenue Elementary School
- Emerson Middle School
- University High School

== In popular culture ==
- Numerous notable individuals have lived in the house at 10050 Cielo Drive, which in August 1969 became notorious for being the site where the Manson family murdered Sharon Tate, Wojciech Frykowski, Abigail Folger, Jay Sebring, and Steven Parent.
- Hollywood producer Jeff Franklin currently owns the property formerly located at 10050 Cielo Drive; the former house was razed, replaced with a new mansion, and assigned a new address: 10066 Cielo Drive.
- In the AMC series Mad Men, reviewers and bloggers have noted what they interpret to be multiple references to Sharon Tate, Roman Polanski, and the Sharon Tate murders. Several of these references relate to a house Megan Draper rents in "the canyon" overlooking Hollywood. In the Season 7 premiere ("Time Zones"), set in late January 1969 (the year in which the Sharon Tate murders took place), Don visits the house and tells Megan it reminds him of Dracula's Castle, and he worries about how isolated it is. Tim Goodman of The Hollywood Reporter pointed out that Tate and Polanski first met on the set of The Fearless Vampire Killers (1967). Also, while admiring the view, Don is startled by the howling of coyotes outside the house, evoking two additional Tate references: Tate dined there with Abigail Folger, Wojciech Frykowski, and Jay Sebring, at 8 p.m. on the night they were later murdered, and Megan assures Don the wild animals are not as close as they sound: "It's just what happens to the sound in the canyons," she says, sharply echoing the second line of Helter Skelter: The True Story of the Manson Murders (1974), which reads, "The canyons above Hollywood and Beverly Hills play tricks with sounds. A noise clearly audible a mile away [1.6 km] might be indistinguishable at a few hundred feet [~91 m]."
- In an episode of Match Game '74, after winning $100 in the "Audience Match" bonus round, the contestant, Barbara, selected Richard Dawson as the person to match in the "Head to Head Match" question for $1,000. The question was "[Blank] Canyon". Barbara told the host, Gene Rayburn, that her answer was "Grand [Canyon]", which was very popular with the audience. Rayburn replied that since Dawson "has only been in the country about 20 minutes" [lots of audience laughter] and doesn't know about American geography [more laughter], her answer would likely not match; indeed, Dawson's answer was "Benedict [Canyon]". Much teasing and razzing ensued, including Dawson writing a new card saying "oops..." and later referencing his "Benedict Canyon" answer in a subsequent verbal exchange with Rayburn.
