= Coldwater Canyon =

Canyon in Los Angeles County, California, United States

Coordinates: 34°6′27″N 118°24′18″W

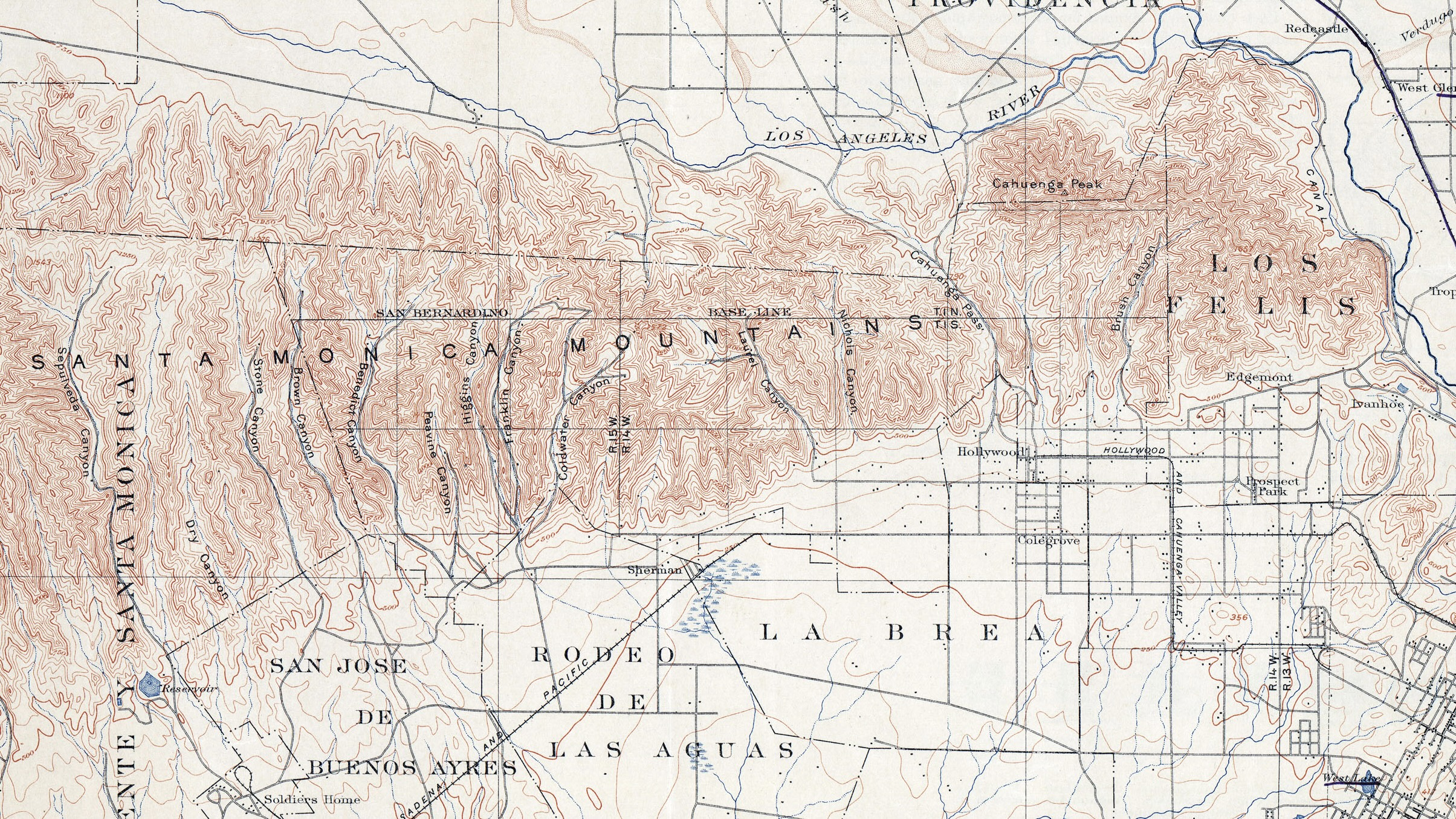
Canyons and creeks of the Santa Monica Mountains in Los Angeles c. 1894

Coldwater Canyon (Spanish: Cañada de las Aguas Frias) is a canyon running perpendicular to and over the central Santa Monica Mountains, in Los Angeles County, California, United States.

A section of the canyon south of Mulholland Drive is also a neighborhood in the Beverly Crest Neighborhood Council of the City of Los Angeles. Hidden Valley is the area "just below Mulholland on the west side of Coldwater" that used to be Myrna Loy's estate.

== Geography ==
The canyon is traversed via Coldwater Canyon Drive and Coldwater Canyon Avenue (linked by a short section of Mulholland Drive), which connects the city of Beverly Hills and the Westside, with the Studio City neighborhood and the San Fernando Valley. The canyon is drained Coldwater Canyon Creek, a tributary of Ballona Creek. Coldwater Canyon Creek is considered an intermittent stream, "flowing southward and southeastward into Rodeo de las Aguas Rancho. Near the mouth of its canyon it receives streams draining Franklin and Higgins canyons."

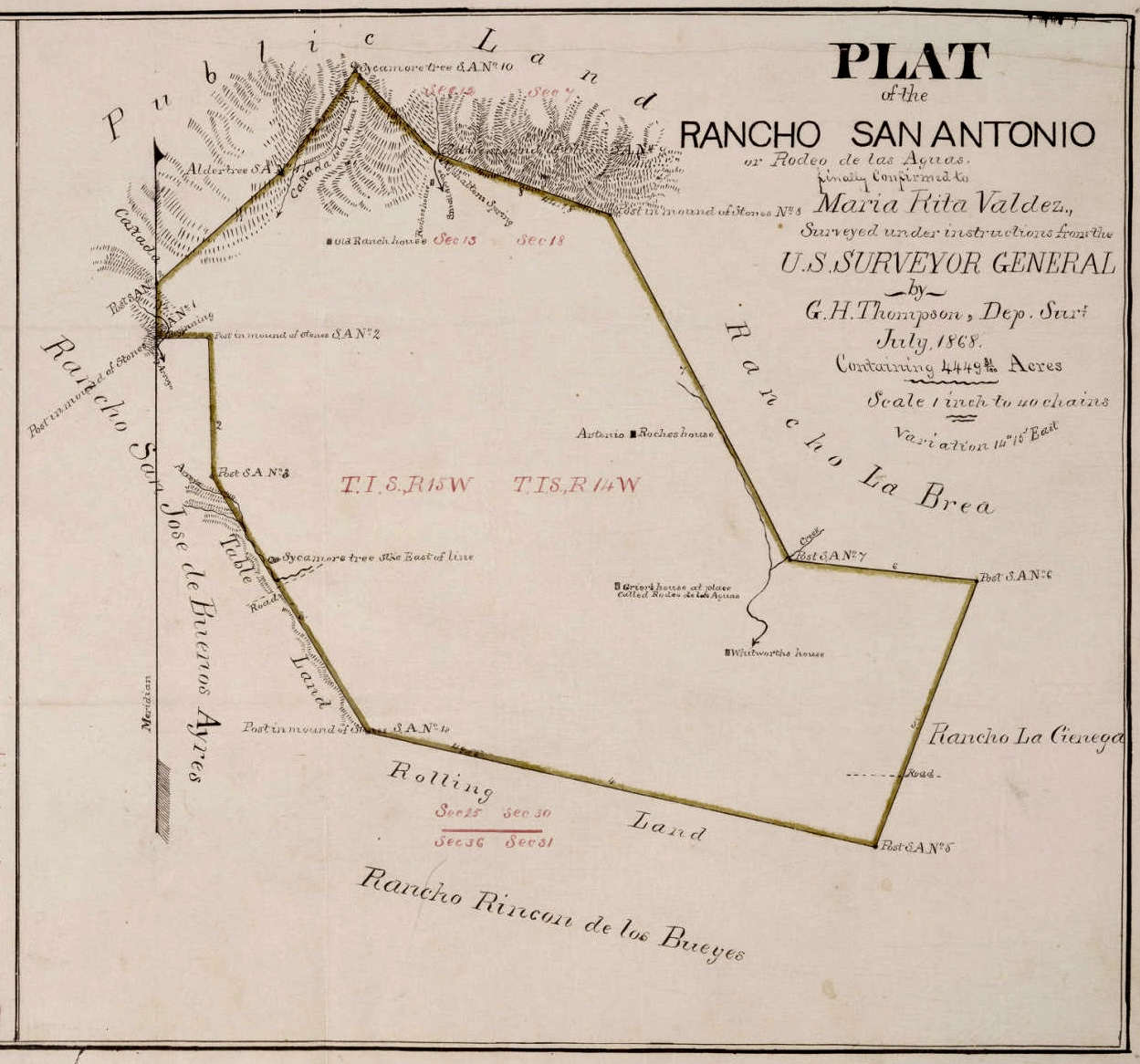
Rancho Rodeo de las Aguas plat map created 1868 likely shows Coldwater as Cañada de las Aguas

== History ==
Fishermen found a good quantity of speckled trout in Coldwater Creek in 1888. There was a rock quarry in the canyon in the 1890s. For much of the first half of the 20th century, the canyon was defined by "orange groves and bridle paths." There were four houses in the canyon around 1908. It snowed in Coldwater Canyon in 1934. There was a "vice joint" affiliated with mobster Mickey Cohen located in the canyon around 1944. In 1954 Jack Palance's wife (Virginia Baker Palance) discovered and reported a brushfire in the canyon that burned 20 acres and destroyed one home before it was extinguished.

== See also ==
- Rancho Rodeo de las Aguas
- Benedict Canyon
- Laurel Canyon
- Nichols Canyon
- Franklin Canyon
- Mandeville Canyon
- Neighborhoods in Los Angeles, California
- Santa Monica Mountains−related topics
