= Wilshire Beverly Center =

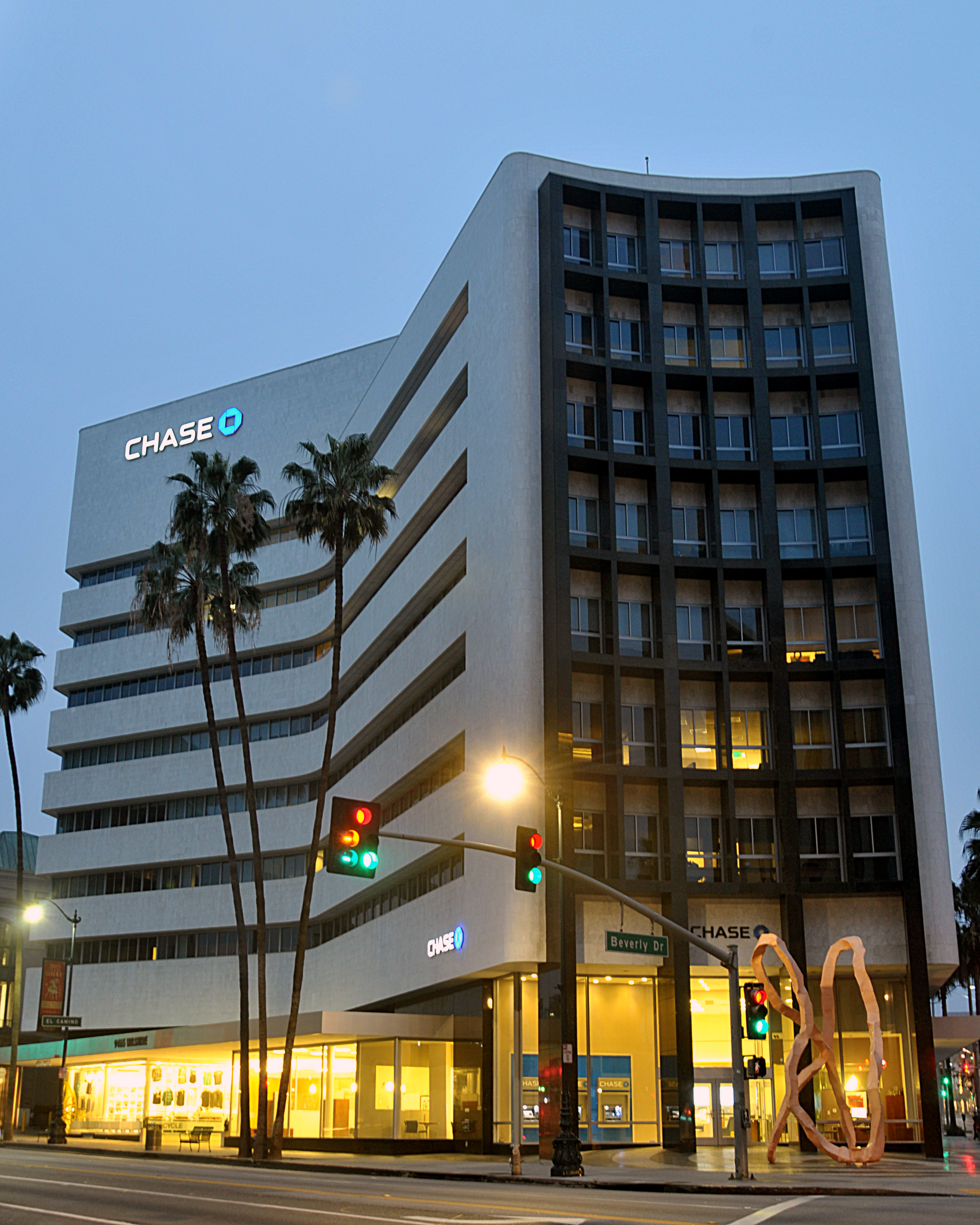
- Interactive map of the Wilshire Beverly Center area

General information
- Status: Completed
- Architectural style: International Style
- Location: 9465 Wilshire Boulevard, Beverly Hills, California
- Coordinates: 34.06766°N 118.40007°W
- Completed: 1962

Technical details
- Floor count: 9

Design and construction
- Architect: Victor Gruen

The Wilshire Beverly Center is a landmark building in Beverly Hills, California.

== Location ==
The building is located on the corner of Wilshire Boulevard and Beverly Drive in the City of Beverly Hills. The exact address is 9465 on Wilshire Boulevard.

== History ==
It was designed in the International Style by renowned architect Victor Gruen (1903-1980) and completed in 1962. It was built by the Buckeye Construction Company, whose founder and CEO was George Konheim (1917–2001). It spans 184,000 square feet over nine floors.

Underneath the building, there are three levels of subterranean parking. In the context of the Cold War, they were also meant to enable 4,000 people to live there for fourteen days in the event of a nuclear attack.

Over the years, it has been home to the largest Bank of America branch in the United States. Additionally, it has been the headquarters of airline companies and a medical center. It currently houses Chase bank, among other tenants.
