= Beverly Hills six-way intersection =

Road junction in California, United States

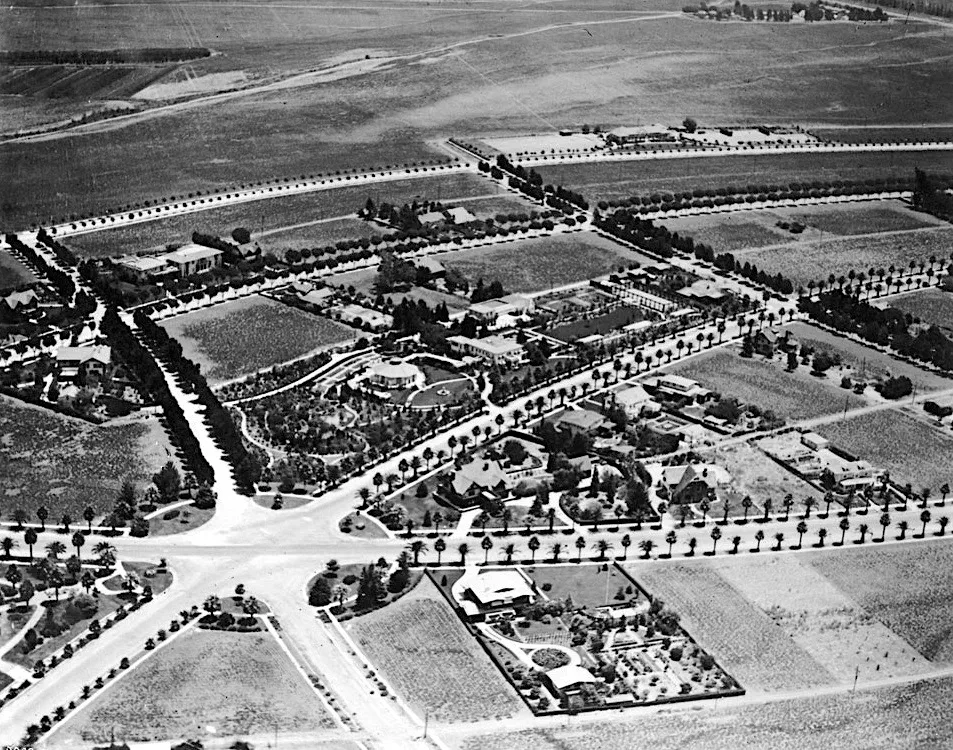
- Aerial view from 1918
- Interactive map of Beverly Hills six-way intersection

Location
- Beverly Hills, California, US
- Coordinates: 34°04′47″N 118°24′42″W
- Roads at junction: Beverly Drive; Canon Drive; Lomitas Avenue

Construction
- Type: Intersection (road)

In Beverly Hills, California, United States, the streets of Beverly Drive, Canon Drive, and Lomitas Avenue converge into a six-way intersection near the Beverly Hills Hotel. Built in 1907, it is the second-largest intersection in the city. The roads converge into a wide-open space with no roundabout, no traffic lights, no yield signs, and no lane markings – just stop signs marking the entryways. Crosswalks and sidewalk ramps were installed in 2023 after a street takeover that occurred the year before. One internet poll found the intersection to be one of the worst in the Los Angeles area, but relatively few vehicle collisions occur; drivers tend to approach the intersection cautiously.

== History and function ==
An intersection was created in 1907 at the confluence of Beverly Drive, Canon Drive, and Lomitas Avenue in Beverly Hills, California. It has since been repaved and had its signs replaced, but was otherwise largely unchanged until the 2020s. The intersection has stop signs at each entry point, but there is no roundabout, and there are no traffic lights, yield signs, or lane markings. A block away from the Beverly Hills Hotel, it is the second-largest intersection in the city, behind the intersection of Wilshire Boulevard and San Vicente Boulevard.

There have been proposals to change the intersection since the 1990s, but the discussion only gained traction after a street takeover in 2022 drew about 150 onlookers, with drivers doing doughnuts and setting off fireworks. In the immediate aftermath, the city added traffic cameras to the intersection. In 2023, looking to discourage future takeovers and improve pedestrian safety, the City Council considered several additional proposals for improvement; the three options were doing nothing, installing a roundabout, and adding sidewalk ramps (in compliance with the Americans with Disabilities Act) and crosswalks with flashing lights. The city's Traffic and Parking Commission unanimously recommended the roundabout, but the City Council ultimately decided against it because of the $4 million price (equivalent to $4.4 million in 2025), opting instead for the ramps and crosswalks.

Drivers tend to handle the intersection cautiously and courteously. According to Bernard Weissman, writing in the Los Angeles Times in 1991, "they don't push, they don't dart, they don't play chicken, they seldom even honk. By common consent, obedient to an impromptu honor system, they are patient, careful, cooperative – as politely deferential as ants crossing a sidewalk." A 2023 Beverly Press article stated that traffic moves slowly through the intersection, while Weissman's 1991 article characterized the traffic as relatively fast and high-volume. Vehicle collisions are fairly rare in the intersection – between 2014 and 2022, there were only 32 – but one city official cited pedestrian safety as a concern before the ramps were installed.

== Analysis and reaction ==
The six-way intersection was not included in a February 2026 Los Angeles Times study ranking the 14 "worst" intersections in Los Angeles. (Note: The Los Angeles Times ranking purports to be a study of Los Angeles city proper, which would exclude Beverly Hills, but the ranking also lists a street from the neighboring city of Inglewood.) Around the time the study was released, however, a tournament-style poll on Instagram launched to find the region's worst intersection; the Beverly Hills six-way intersection quickly became one of the favored choices. Within a day or two, the poll went viral on Reddit, with users in the Los Angeles subreddit sharing their experiences of the intersections. The Beverly Hills intersection came in 2nd place out of 64 candidates, with the intersection of Virgil Avenue, Sunset Boulevard, and Hollywood Boulevard coming in first.

A writer for Vogue included the Beverly Hills junction in a humorous list of potential alternate challenges for the 2028 Summer Olympics in Los Angeles, explaining, "One six-way intersection. Zero stop lights. Just vibes. Fastest to cross without having a full-blown panic attack wins." Weissman, on the other hand, cited the intersection as a positive example of anarchy in action, arguing that even in the absence of strict rules, people still cooperate, rather than creating chaos.
