= Corpus Christi Catholic Church, Pacific Palisades =

Catholic church building in California

Corpus Christi Catholic Church

Religion
- Affiliation: Catholic Church
- Diocese: Catholic Archdiocese of Los Angeles
- Status: Destroyed

Location
- Location: 880 Toyopa Drive; Pacific Palisades
- State: California

Architecture
- Destroyed: January 8, 2025 (Palisades Fire)

Website
- corpuschristichurch.com

Corpus Christi Catholic Church was a Catholic church in Pacific Palisades, California. It was destroyed in January 2025 during the Palisades Fire.

== History ==
The church was built in the 1950s and served the neighborhood of Pacific Palisades, between Santa Monica and Malibu, on the western side of Los Angeles County. The church was organized by "Fr. Richard Cotter, a buoyant Irishman from Cork and the director of the Catholic Youth Organization." The congregation originally met in the local YMCA. The church building was constructed in the 1960s, in line with Father Cotter's vision of an "enormous, modernist, parabolic brick structure. He liked to say it was like the extended arms of the Lord, welcoming parishioners into...'the body of Christ.'"

It was the parish church for several celebrities. Corpus Christi was under the authority of the Archdiocese of Los Angeles.

On January 8, 2025, the church was destroyed during the Palisades Fire. According to an image shared by Archdiocese of Los Angeles, the only remaining part of the church following the fire was a steel frame. The affiliated parish school was damaged in the fire.

== See also ==
- Our Lady of the Angels Pastoral Region
- Community United Methodist Church of Pacific Palisades
