= Ace Gallery =

Contemporary art gallery in Los Angeles, California

Coordinates: 34.06214°N 118.34888°W

ACE Gallery
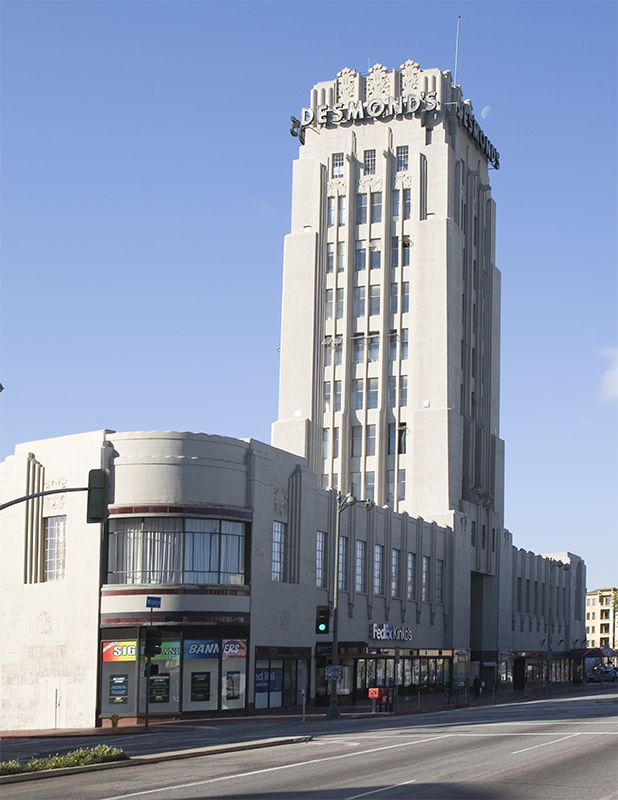
- ACE Gallery Los Angeles occupies the 2nd floor of 5514 Wilshire Blvd in Los Angeles, California
- Industry: Art gallery
- Founded: 1961
- Founder: Douglas Chrismas
- Headquarters: Los Angeles, United States
- Website: www.acegallery.art

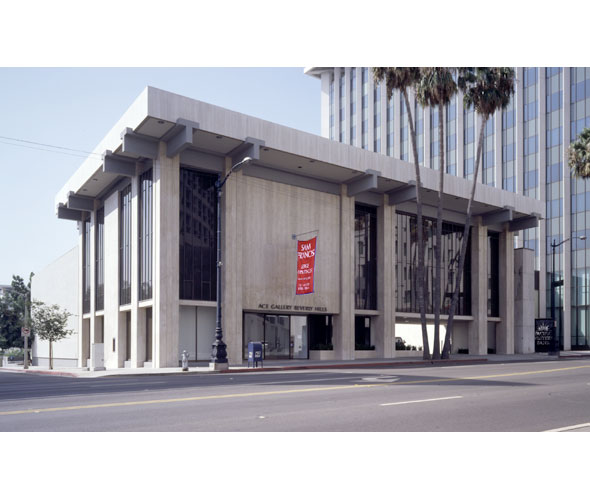
Exterior of ACE Gallery Beverly Hills, 9430 Wilshire Blvd, Beverly Hills, CA 90212

ACE Gallery is an internationally recognized art gallery specializing in contemporary art. ACE Gallery Los Angeles is located in the Miracle Mile section of Los Angeles a few blocks east of Museum Row.

== Locations ==
=== ACE Gallery Los Angeles ===
Since 1986, ACE Gallery Los Angeles has occupied the entire second floor of the Wilshire Tower. This 11-story Art Deco structure fills an entire block of Wilshire Boulevard's Miracle Mile. The building first opened on March 15, 1929, with Desmond Department Store that signaled the start of this becoming an important retail district. Inside the Wilshire Tower, Ace has 30,000 feet of museum-quality gallery space.

=== ACE Gallery Beverly Hills ===
In 2003, ACE Gallery opened an annex in Beverly Hills with an inaugural exhibition of large paintings by Sam Francis. ACE Gallery Beverly Hills closed in November 2016. The site of this location will be replaced by the Beverly Drive station as part of the D Line Extension.

=== ACE Museum ===
In 1985, ACE Gallery launched an exhibition space in a 13,000 ft^{2} (1,200 m^{2}) warehouse with 25-foot (7.6 m) ceilings at 5917 Burchard St. near Venice and La Cienega boulevards called the "Ace Museum." Incorporated in June 2009, Ace Museum became a separate and independent non-profit organization. The current museum is located at 400 South La Brea Avenue in the Hancock Park neighborhood of Los Angeles.

As of the change of directorship in April 2016, ACE Gallery Los Angeles and ACE Gallery Beverly Hills have no relationship with Ace Museum.

== History ==
In 1961, ACE Gallery founder Douglas Chrismas opened his own frame shop and gallery in Vancouver at the age of 17. His gallery became known as a venue where Vancouver artists could show alongside major New Yorker artists, and get the feeling of belonging to a bigger scene. In the 60s and early 70s he brought artists such as Robert Rauschenberg, Carl Andre, Sol LeWitt, Bruce Nauman, and Donald Judd to Vancouver, Canada.

The gallery relocated to Los Angeles in 1967 at the former Virginia Dwan Gallery space in Westwood. Chrismad opened a second location in Venice, Los Angeles in 1972. In 1978, the gallery expanded with a third location in an old car showroom on Georgia Street in Vancouver. The galleries were noted for doing museum-level exhibitions by up-and-coming and internationally renowned artists.

In 1972, Christmas mounted Robert Irwin's installation Room Angle Light Volume at the first ACE/Venice, which opened at 72 Market Street in 1971. In 1977, ACE mounted exhibitions of work by Andy Warhol, Frank Stella and Robert Motherwell, along with Michael Heizer’s Displaced/Replaced Mass. Installed at ACE/Venice, the Heizer piece required that huge chunks be gouged out of the gallery floor to create recessed areas able to accommodate boulders.

The gallery further expanded with a New York location in 1994. The New York gallery's presence was amplified by doing exhibitions in conjunction with cultural institutions such as the Guggenheim Museum and the Cartier Foundation (Paris). Under Christmas' directorship, ACE Gallery has had either offices or galleries in art centers outside of the United States, such as Mexico City, Paris, Berlin, and Beijing.

In April 2016, ACE Gallery emerged from a three-year bankruptcy proceeding under the leadership of Sam S. Leslie. In May 2016, founder Douglas Chrismas was terminated from all roles at the gallery.

In July 2021, Douglas Chrismas was arrested by the FBI and charged with embezzlement.

In May 2022, Douglas Chrismas was ordered to repay 14.2 million in ACE art sale profits, which were diverted to personal accounts.

In September 2022, the Los Angeles Times did a long expose on Christmas' career and the state of his court case where he faced "up to 15 years in prison if convicted".

In June 2024, Christmas was found guilty of embezzlement and is awaiting sentencing.

== Controversies ==
In a 1983 lawsuit in Los Angeles federal court, Rauschenberg sought $500,000 from Christmas' Flow ACE Gallery; the artist won a $140,000 judgment in the suit in 1984. Eventually the two reconciled their differences and in 1997 Robert Rauschenberg insisted that ACE Gallery New York (in conjunction with the Guggenheim Museum) host his Retrospective.

In 1986, Christmas pleaded no contest after Canadian real estate developer C. Frederick Stimpson alleged that he had improperly sold work belonging to the collector, among them pieces by Andy Warhol and Rauschenberg. Under the terms of the settlement, Christmas agreed to pay Stimpson $650,000 over a period of five years. He continues to work with the Stimpson family in handling their art interests.

In 1989, ACE Gallery wanted to borrow a work by Judd along with Carl Andre's 1968 Fall, both owned by Count Giuseppe Panza, for an exhibition devoted to minimal art called The Innovators Entering into the Sculpture. Rather than shipping the two large scale works from Italy, Panza authorized ACE Gallery to refabricate the pieces in Los Angeles. In Panza's collection archives, there is a series of signed certificates signed by Judd that granted Panza broad authority over the works by Judd in his collection. These certificates "authorized Panza and followers to reconstruct work for a variety of reasons," as long as instructions and documentation provided by Judd were followed and either he or his estate was notified. This even included the right to make "temporary exhibition copies, as long as the temporary copy was destroyed after the exhibition; and the right to recreate the work to save expense and difficulty in transportation as long as the original was then destroyed." Miwon Kwon, in her account of site specificity: "One Place After Another," presents the account of ACE Gallery recreating artworks by Donald Judd and Carl Andre without the artist's permission. Andre and Judd both publicly denounced these recreations as "a gross falsification" and a "forgery," in letters to Art in America, however, the fabrication of the pieces were permitted by Panza Collection in Italy, the owner of the works. Despite the confusion surrounding the Panza refabrications, both Carl Andre and Donald Judd maintained a professional relationship with Douglas Christmas and ACE Gallery. Andre showcased works at ACE Gallery in 1997, 2002, 2007, 2011 and present day. In 2007, Carl Andre's show entitled "Zinc" was exhibited at ACE Gallery in Beverly Hills. Donald Judd paid a visit to The Innovators Entering into the Sculpture exhibition at ACE Gallery and agreed to keep his sculpture in the exhibition. After the exhibition was over, Christmas planned to sell the metal used for the re-fabrication of Judd's work for scrap metal but Judd wanted to own the re-fabrication for himself. ACE Gallery then sold the re-fabrication of Donald Judd's work to Donald Judd.

After having consigned more than $4 million worth of art to ACE Gallery to sell in 1997 and 1998, the sculptor Jannis Kounellis filed a lawsuit in Los Angeles Superior Court in 2006, accusing Christmas of keeping most of the profits of artworks and refusing to return the pieces that did not sell. According to the lawsuit, the primary agreement between Kounellis and Christmas was oral. Christmas returned all of Kouenllis' artwork, and did a full accounting of the proceeds from Kounellis' work—minus the expense of exhibiting it. The matter was resolved between the two of them and ACE Gallery still sells and exhibits Kounellis' work today.

By 2006, Christmas had filed for Chapter 11 bankruptcy protection at least six times since 1982, barring most of his creditors from collecting the money immediately owed to them. Christmas filed for Chapter 11 bankruptcy to protect the gallery's extensive real estate holdings from the problematic landlord. The landlord of the Wilshire Boulevard space, Wilshire Dunsmuir Company, claimed that ACE owed back rent and penalties however, the claim was disputed by Douglas Christmas. In court papers, Christmas Fine Art claimed that it would cure "the pre-petition" debt by Feb. 1, 2000, and was asking the court to protect its right to remain in the property. A declaration filed by Douglas Christmas characterized this leasehold as the business' primary asset.

Nancy Wandlass a San Francisco art dealer, made a deal with Barral, a New York art dealer, to sell a Lichtenstein and Basquiat that had been smuggled into the country by Edemar Cid Ferreira, the former head of Brazil's Banco Santos. In turn, according to a January 2007 consignment agreement, they agreed to have Doug Christmas, owner of ACE Gallery in Los Angeles, sell the Lichtenstein. Christmas sold it for $1.3 million to L.A.-area collector Seth Landsberg, who appraised it at $3.5 million for resale at Sotheby's. ACE Gallery then ran the painting's name through a database of stolen artworks. Days later, a federal agent contacted the gallery to warn Christmas that the Lichtenstein was subject to seizure and forfeiture, court papers say. In 2008, federal agents seized Modern Painting With Yellow Interweave (1967) by Roy Lichtenstein from the Los Angeles home of collector Seth Landsberg (The painting was returned in 2010 to the Museum of Contemporary Art, University of São Paulo.)
