= Temescal Creek =

Temescal Creek may refer to:

- Temescal Creek (Northern California)
- Temescal Creek, San Diego County, tributary of San Dieguito River
- Temescal Creek (Riverside County), tributary of the Santa Ana River

== See also ==
- Temescal Creek, stream through Temescal Canyon, Los Angeles County
