= Beverly Cañon Gardens =

Park in Beverly Hills, California, US

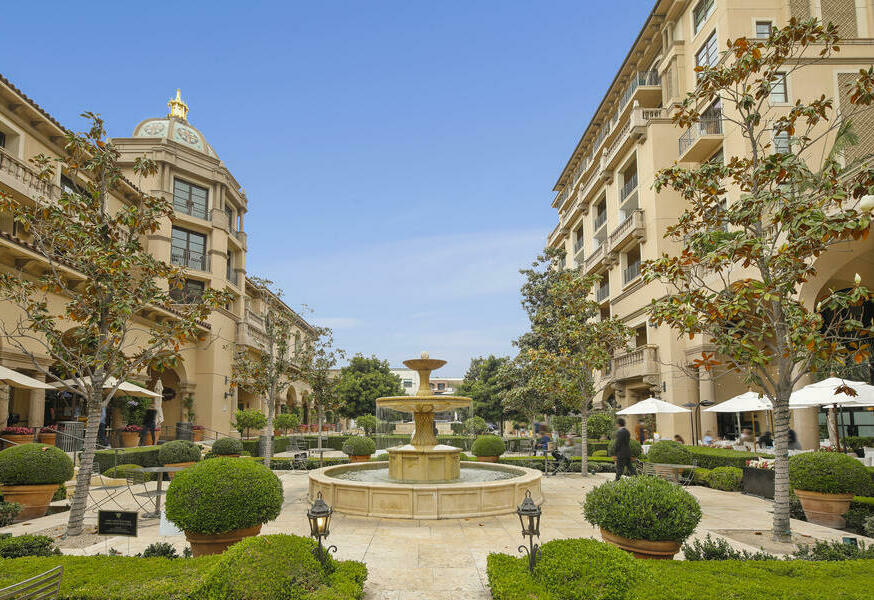
- Interactive map of Beverly Cañon Gardens
- Type: Municipal
- Location: 241 North Cañon Drive, Beverly Hills, California
- Coordinates: 34.06804°N 118.39931°W

Beverly Cañon Gardens is a public park in Beverly Hills, California.

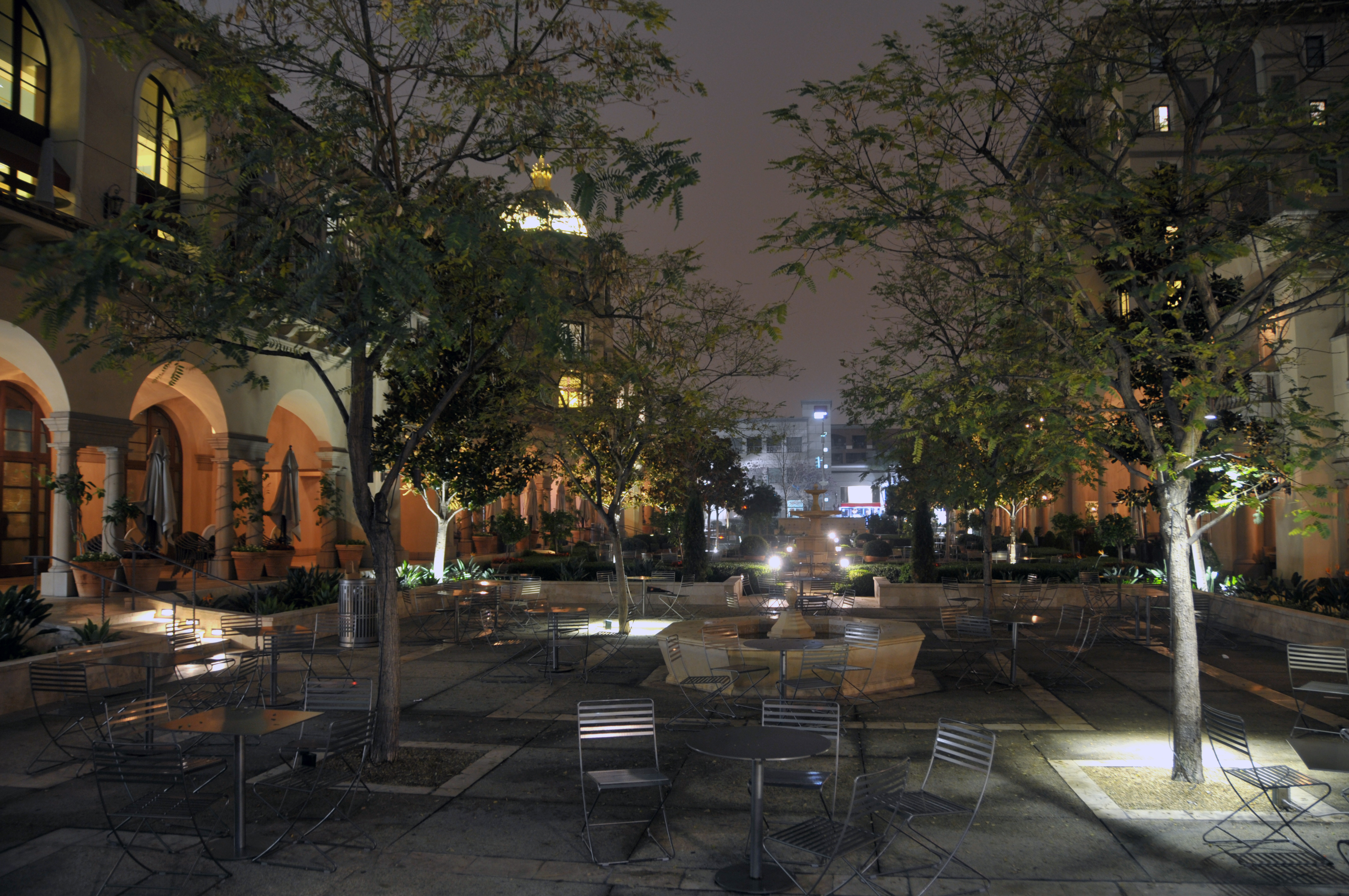
Beverly Cañon Gardens, looking East.

== Location ==
The address is 241 North Cañon Drive. The park runs from Cañon Drive to Beverly Drive and spans 33,000 square feet. On one side is the Montage Beverly Hills and on the other side is Bouchon, chef Thomas Keller's restaurant.

== History ==
The park was created by the developers of the Montage Beverly Hills hotel, and was officially opened in 2009. It has landscaped gardens (including sycamores, topiaries and tulip trees), walkways with colonnades on each side, and dining tables. The fountain in the center was handcarved in Israel.

In the summer, the city organizes 'Concerts on Canon', a series of weekly concerts, as well as Sunday Movie Nights, both of which take place in the park. In September 2014, the city screened Troop Beverly Hills, a movie set in Beverly Hills.

In August 2014, 400 residents who took part in the "Walk with the Mayor" program celebrated Mayor Lili Bosse's birthday in the park.
