= Franklin Canyon Park =

City park in Los Angeles, California

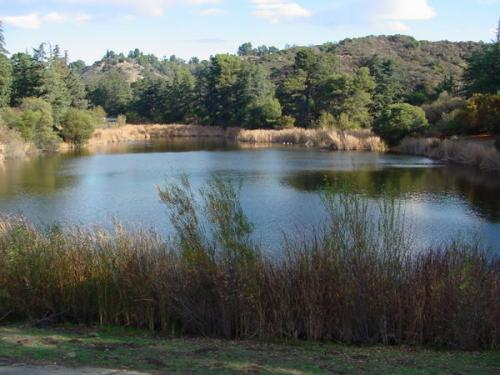
- Franklin Lake
- Interactive map of Franklin Canyon Park
- Type: Urban park
- Location: Unincorporated area abutting Beverly Hills Post Office, Beverly Hills, and the city of Los Angeles, California
- Coordinates: 34.1031°N 118.4122°W
- Area: 605 acres (245 ha)
- Elevation: 630
- Created: 1981
- Operator: Mountains Recreation and Conservation Authority, for the Santa Monica Mountains Conservancy
- Open: All year

Franklin Canyon Park is a public municipal park located between Benedict Canyon and Coldwater Canyon, at the eastern end of the Santa Monica Mountains, in Los Angeles, California. The park comprises 605 acres (245 ha), and is located near the geographical center of the city of Los Angeles. Franklin Canyon is also the name of the canyon and surrounding neighborhood.

The park features a 3-acre (1.2 ha) lake, a duck pond and over five miles (8 km) of hiking trails. The lake and pond are visited by birds in the Pacific Flyway.

The park is managed by the Mountains Recreation and Conservation Authority (MRCA), a partnership between the state-based Santa Monica Mountains Conservancy and the county-based Conejo Recreation and Park District and Rancho Simi Recreation and Park District, responsible for the parks those four organizations own or operate in the Los Angeles and Ventura counties.

The park has been used as a filming location for numerous television and film productions, including the hitchhiking scene in the 1934 film It Happened One Night and for the opening credits of The Andy Griffith Show.

== History ==
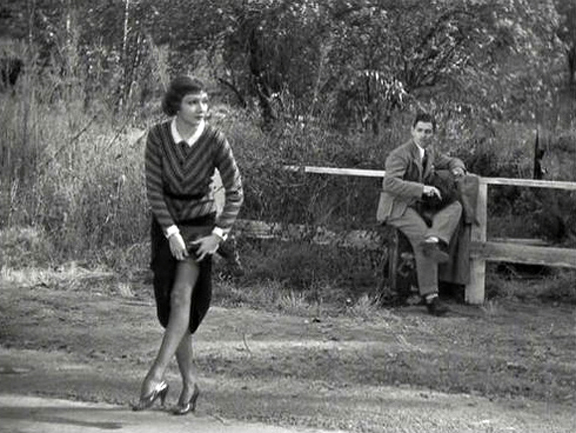
Characters played by Claudette Colbert and Clark Gable try to hitchhike in It Happened One Night.

The park traces its beginnings to 1914 when William Mulholland and the Los Angeles Department of Water and Power built a reservoir in upper Franklin Canyon. The canyon was used by the family of oil baron Edward L. Doheny as a summer retreat. The 1930s began the frequent use of the canyon for filming. Claudette Colbert's hitchhiking scene from It Happened One Night was filmed in 1935. Today about 25 films are shot here annually. During the 1970s the canyon was spared from development through the efforts of conservationist Sooky Goldman and Congressman Howard Berman, which resulted in the creation of the park.

== Neighborhood ==
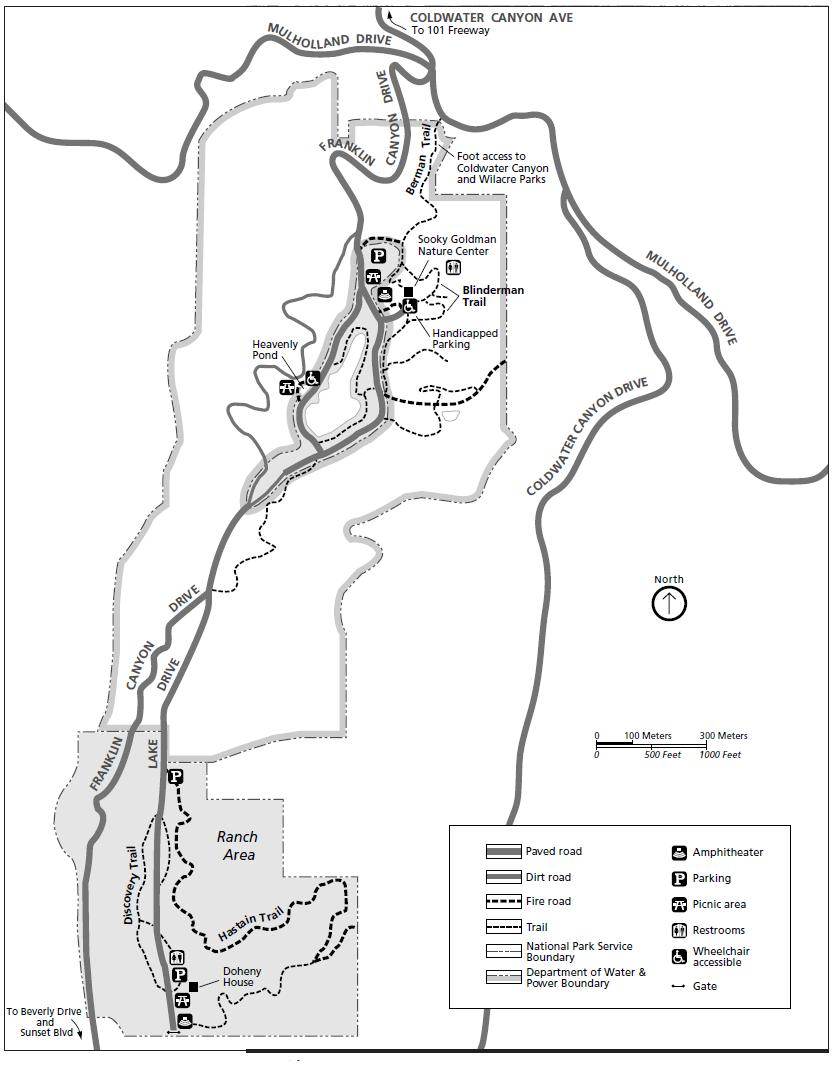
Map of Franklin Canyon Park

The Franklin Canyon neighborhood lies south of Mulholland Drive and extends south almost to the city limits of Beverly Hills. It contains about 700 single-family homes. It is represented by the North Beverly Drive/Franklin Canyon Homeowners Association, a member of the Bel Air–Beverly Crest Neighborhood Council.

== Flora and fauna ==
Franklin Canyon is rich in plant life. Chaparral, shady grassland meadows and oak woodlands are found in the park. Also within the park's boundaries are sycamore, redwood and walnut trees, along with non-native pine and cedar. A vast array of wildflowers grow here.

The park is home to a variety of indigenous wildlife such as frogs, rabbits, squirrels, rats, mice, snakes, cougars, gray foxes, coyotes, and bobcats. Known as a bird watcher's delight, great horned owls, as many as seven species of hawk can be found here, and even eagles. Also found are ducks, including Mandarins and Wood ducks. Franklin Canyon is part of the Pacific Flyway and as a result the resident bird species often share company with neo-tropical migrants and other transient species, such as Canada geese.

== Activities ==
Popular activities are hiking, cycling, picnicking and bird watching. Park staff lead regularly scheduled hikes. Swimming and fishing are not permitted. The park conducts natural history programs at the Sooky Goldman Nature Center, and the William O. Douglas Outdoor Classroom.

Located directly adjacent to Franklin Park is the headquarters of the conservation organization TreePeople. TreePeople also offers organized hikes, as well as tree care workshops and themed festivals.

== Stop sign cameras ==
In July, 2007, the Mountains Recreation and Conservation Authority installed three stop sign cameras in the park. The cameras photograph on average 17 motorists per day. The cost of the citation is $175. A spokeswoman for MRCA said, "We have seen a significant reduction in the number of people running stop signs." Former Beverly Hills city attorney Jack Allen opposes the cameras. He decried the alleged safety issue saying, "They're not speeding through there." In September 2010 a class action lawsuit was filed against the MRCA. The chief staff legal counsel of MRCA said in 2015 that the camera and ticketing program generates $1.5 million in revenue annually and costs the agency about $780,000. Cameras are also installed at Temescal Canyon Park, Marvin Braude Mulholland Gateway Park, and Topanga State Park. MRCA issues roughly 24,000 traffic citations each year for various violations.

== Gallery ==
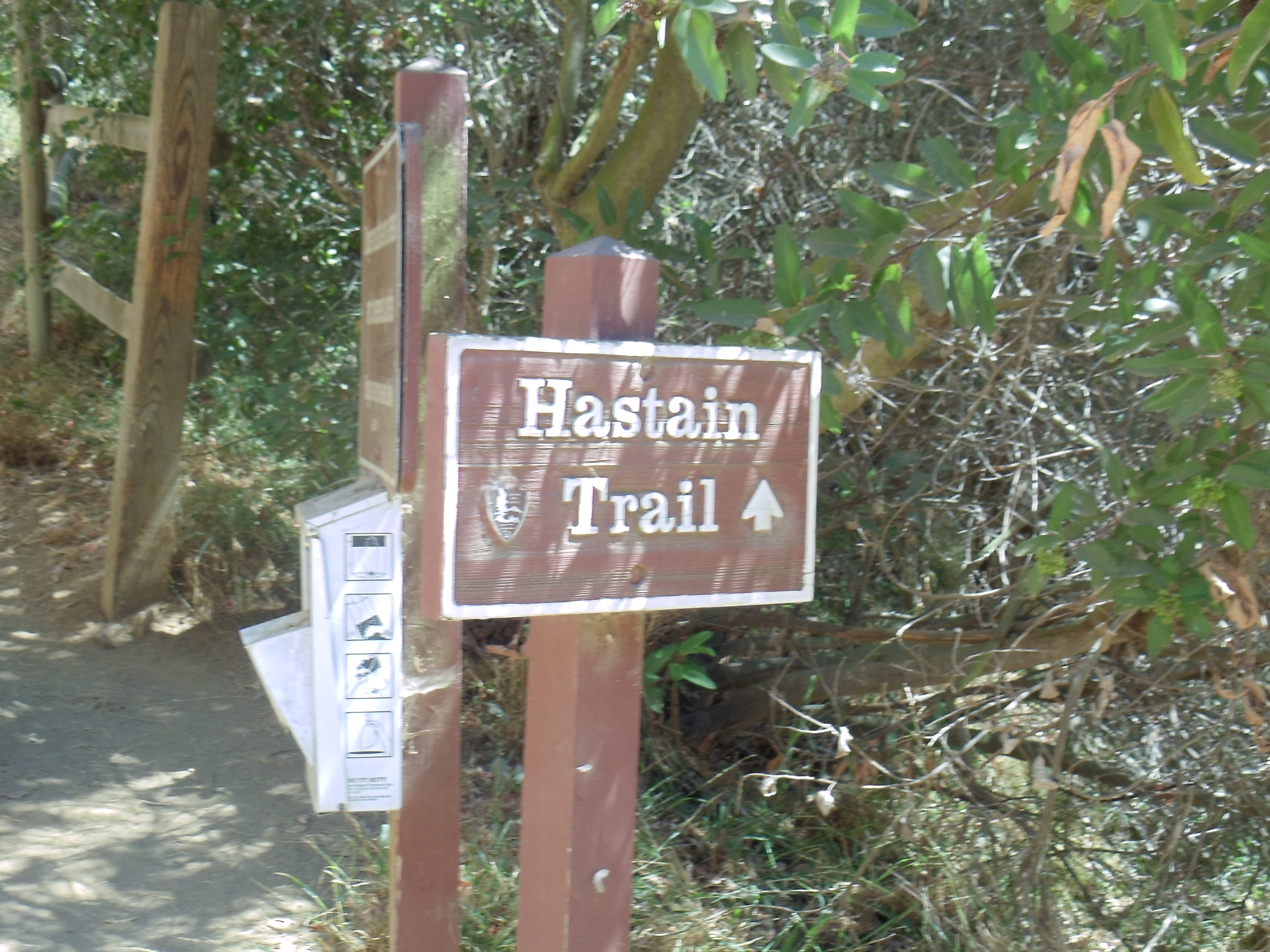
Hastain Trail sign in Franklin Canyon Park

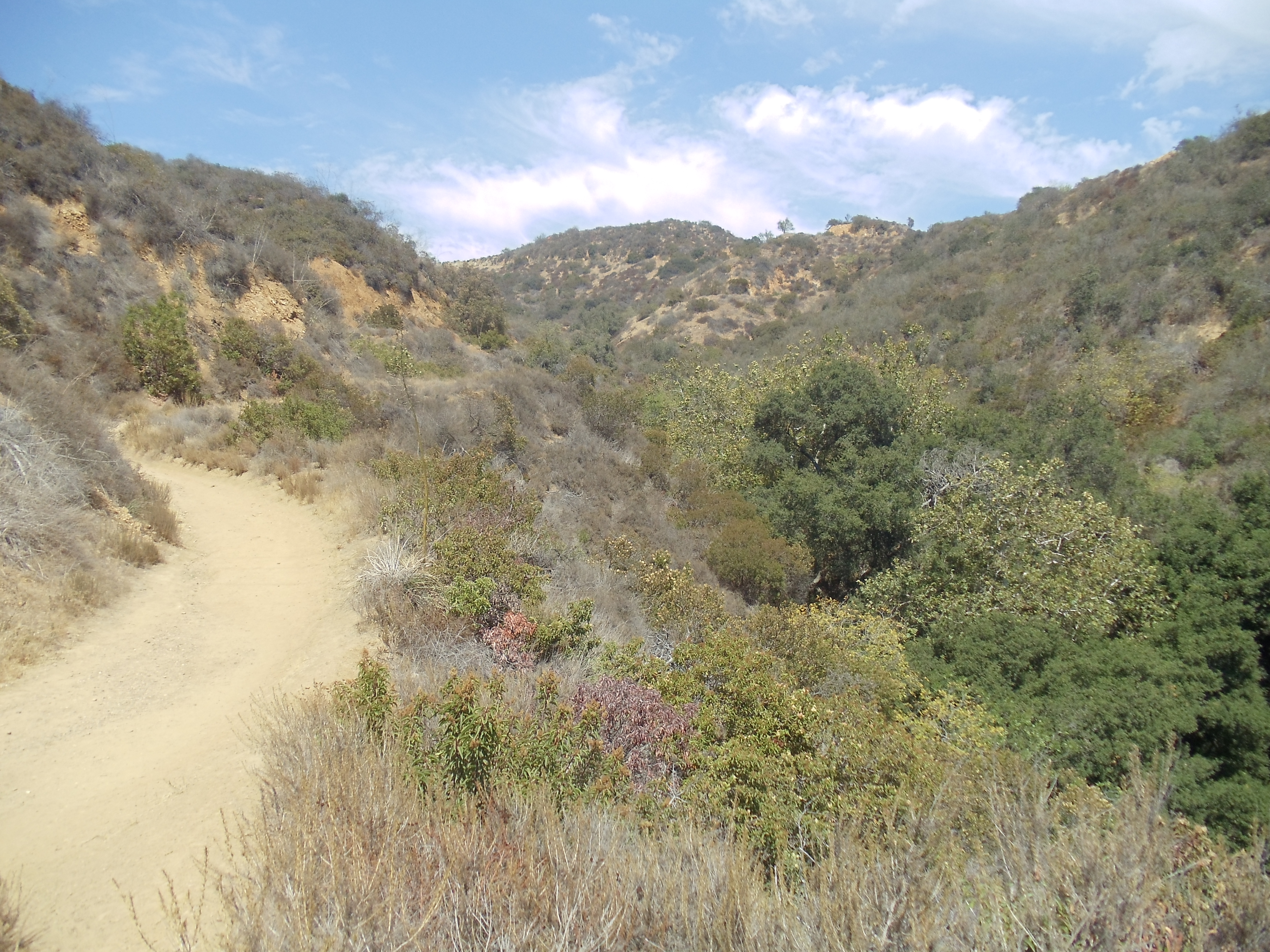
Hastain Trail in Franklin Canyon Park

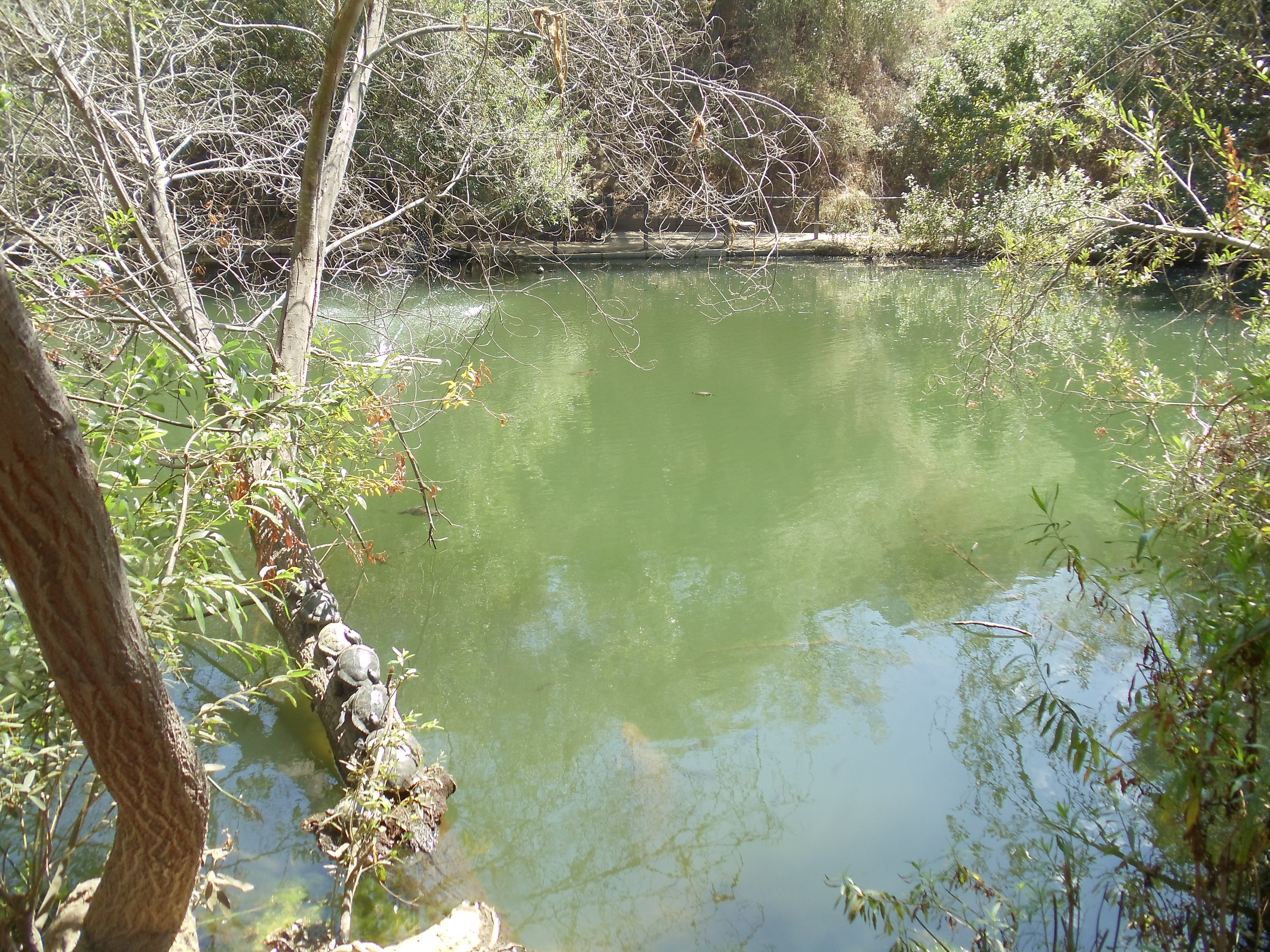
Heavenly Pond in Franklin Canyon Park

== In the media ==
This is a partial list of media which have used Franklin Canyon Park:

=== Film ===
- Private Lives (1931)
- It Happened One Night (1934) - Claudette Colbert's hitch-hiking scene, rural roads were filmed here
- These Three (1936)
- The Lady Escapes (1937)
- I Met My Love Again (1938)
- Four Men and a Prayer (1938)
- A Ducking They Did Go (1939)
- Creature from the Black Lagoon (1954) - the lagoon is Franklin Lake.
- The Manchurian Candidate (1962)
- The Man (1972)
- Bittersweet Love (1976)
- On Golden Pond (1981) - the eponymous pond
- A Nightmare on Elm Street (1984)
- Purple Rain (1984)
- Rambo: First Blood Part II (1985)
- Platoon (1986)
- The Great Outdoors (1988)
- Kindergarten Cop (1990)
- The Silence of the Lambs (1991)
- Camp Nowhere (1992)
- Sleepwalkers (1992)
- Drowning Mona (2000)
- Big Momma's House (2000)
- Dr. Dolittle 2 (2001)
- Minority Report (2002)
- Win a Date with Tad Hamilton! (2004)
- When a Stranger Calls (2006)
- Georgia Rule (2007)
- All About Steve (2007)
- National Treasure: Book of Secrets (2007)
- I Love You, Beth Cooper (2008)

=== Television ===
- According To Jim
- American Horror Story: 1984
- The Andy Griffith Show - opening credits fishing hole, Myers Lake, is Franklin Lake
- B. J. and the Bear
- Bonanza
- The Brady Bunch
- Camp Runamuck
- Combat!
- Criminal Minds
- CSI: NY
- Doogie Howser, M.D.
- Dynasty
- ER
- Falcon Crest
- Green Acres - S3E15 "No Trespassing"
- How I Met Your Mother
- JAG
- How the West Was Won
- Hunter
- Lassie
- Leave it to Beaver - S3E7 "Borrowed Boat (Friends Lake)"
- Mannix - S3E2 "Color Her Missing"
- Matlock
- Murder She Wrote
- NCIS
- Quantum Leap
- Salem's Lot
- Salute Your Shorts
- Santa Barbara
- Sons Of Anarchy
- Star Trek - some alien landscapes, including "The Paradise Syndrome"
- That Girlthe rifleman
- True Blood
- Twin Peaks
- The Fugitive - S1E14 "The Girl from Little Egypt"
- The Waltons - S4E25 "The Collision"
- Will And Grace
- The Young and the Restless

=== Music ===
The park was used by photographer Guy Webster as a background for the following album covers:

- Sounds of Silence, Simon & Garfunkel
- Big Hits (High Tide and Green Grass), The Rolling Stones

== See also ==
- Santa Monica Mountains National Recreation Area
- Santa Monica Mountains
