= Beverly Drive =

Roadway in Beverly Hills and Los Angeles, California, U.S.

Coordinates: 34°4′23″N 118°24′18″W

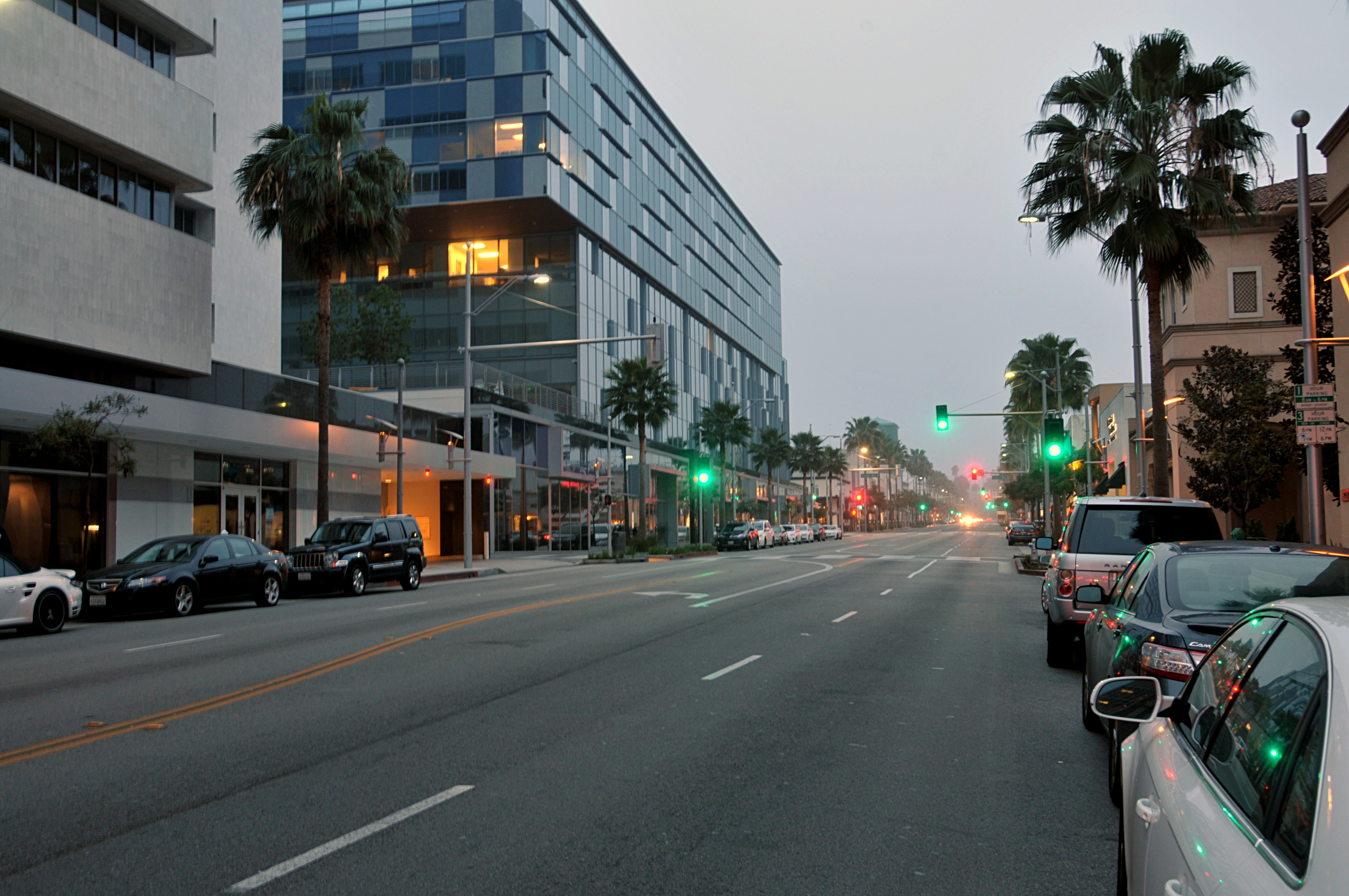
- Beverly Drive, looking North from Wilshire Boulevard, 2015
- Interactive map of Beverly Drive
- Maintained by: Bureau of Street Services, City of Los Angeles Department of Public Works; City of Beverly Hills
- Location: Los Angeles, California; Beverly Hills, California
- South end: Harlow Avenue in Los Angeles
- Major junctions: Wilshire Boulevard; Sunset Boulevard
- North end: North of Desford Drive in Beverly Hills

Beverly Drive is a major north–south roadway in Beverly Hills and Los Angeles.

== Location ==
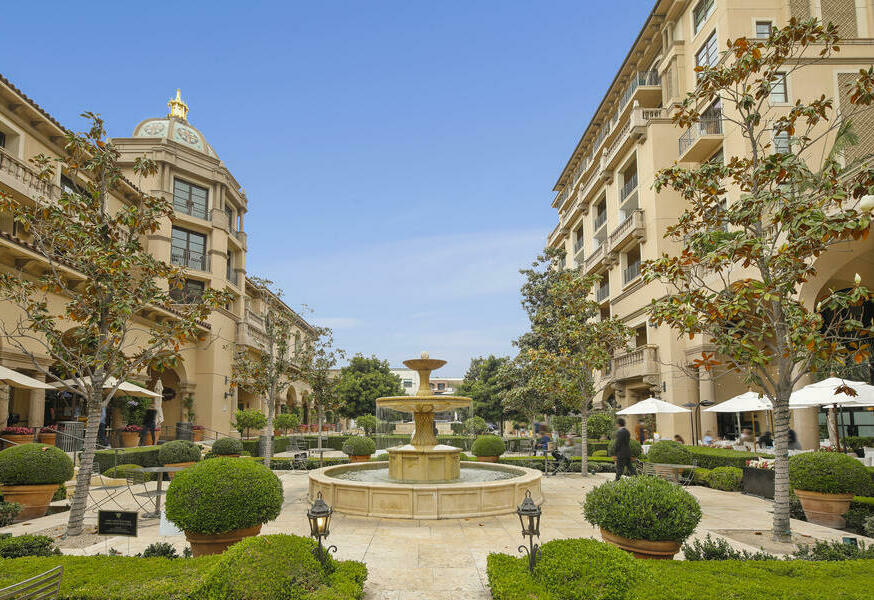
Beverly Cañon Gardens, between Beverly Drive and Cañon Drive.

=== South Beverly Drive ===
South Beverly Drive begins northbound at Harlow Avenue, a small street just north of the Santa Monica Freeway in the city of Los Angeles. It passes through the residential neighborhood of Beverlywood and intersects with Pico Boulevard before entering the city of Beverly Hills at Whitworth Avenue. Between Olympic and Wilshire Boulevards, it becomes markedly commercial, with dining and shopping establishments throughout. This street is the location of the original California Pizza Kitchen.

=== North Beverly Drive ===
North Beverly Drive begins northbound after Wilshire, with a continuation of luxury stores and restaurants. North of Santa Monica Boulevard it crosses Beverly Gardens Park and enters one of the city's more lavish residential neighborhoods. Before crossing Sunset Boulevard it approaches a broad six-way intersection with Canon Drive and Lomitas Avenue, with Will Rogers Memorial Park at its northwest corner. At the intersection of Beverly and Sunset lies the historic Beverly Hills Hotel, one of the city's most notable landmarks. It continues northbound to Coldwater Canyon Park and Beverly Hills Fire Station #2, where arterial traffic merges onto Coldwater Canyon Drive and crosses the Santa Monica Mountains to connect with the eastern San Fernando Valley.

It is possible to continue north on Beverly by turning left at the merger with Coldwater Canyon and passing west of the park. The terrain becomes noticeably hillier and later mountainous as the street enters the Santa Monica Mountains National Recreation Area. Franklin Canyon Reservoir is directly to the east, and later, Franklin Canyon Park with its Upper Franklin Canyon Reservoir.

The road ends just north of Desford Drive in Beverly Hills at a private residence.
