= Temescal Canyon, Los Angeles =

Canyon in Los Angeles, California, United States

Temescal Canyon (Temescal, Spanish for "sweat lodge") is a valley lying in Pacific Palisades within the Los Angeles County portion of the Santa Monica Mountains in California.

Head of Canyon 34°06′21″N 118°32′27″W Mouth of Canyon 34°02′09″N 118°32′07″W

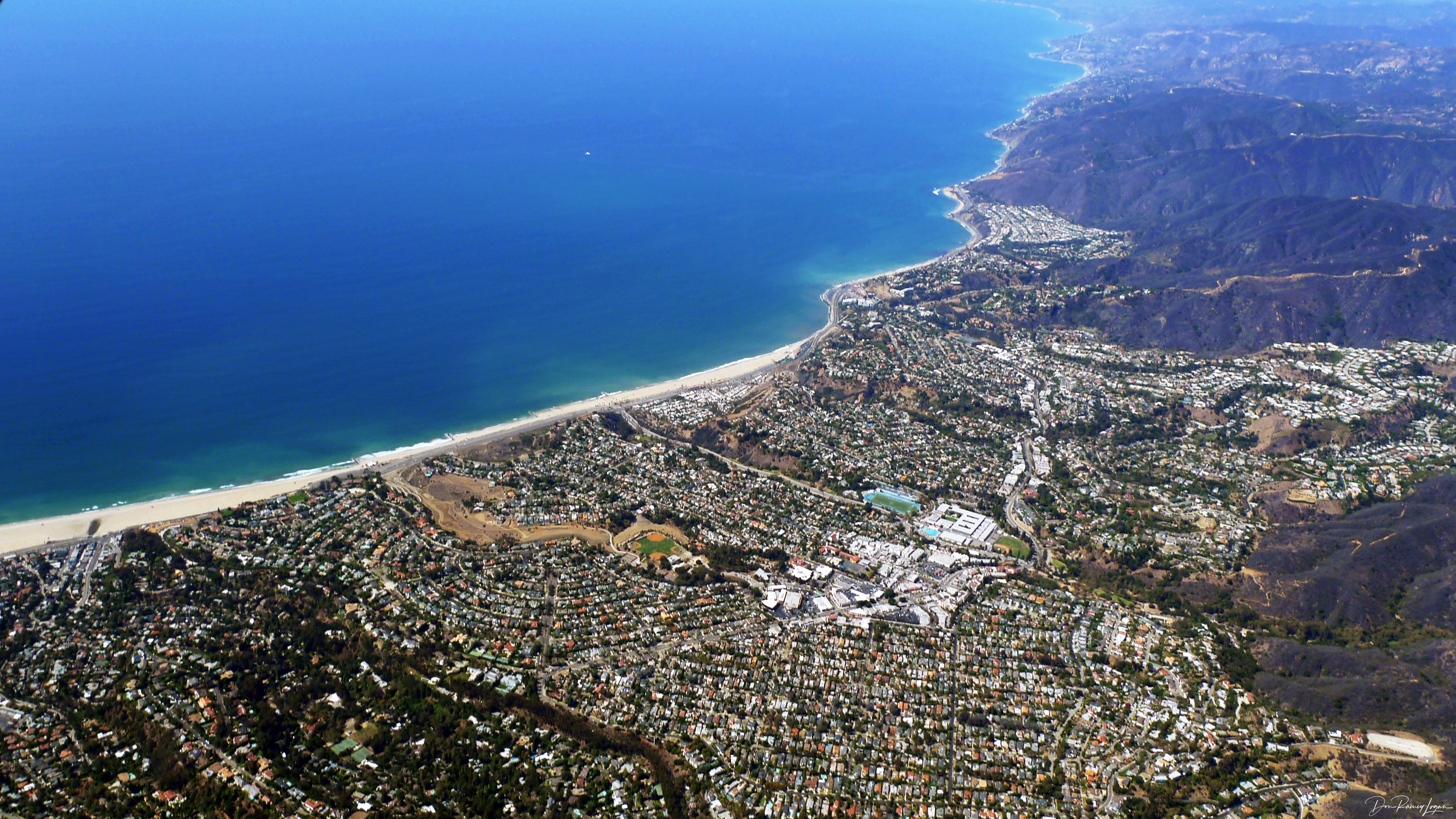
Temescal Canyon can be seen in the center of this aerial photo of Pacific Palisades

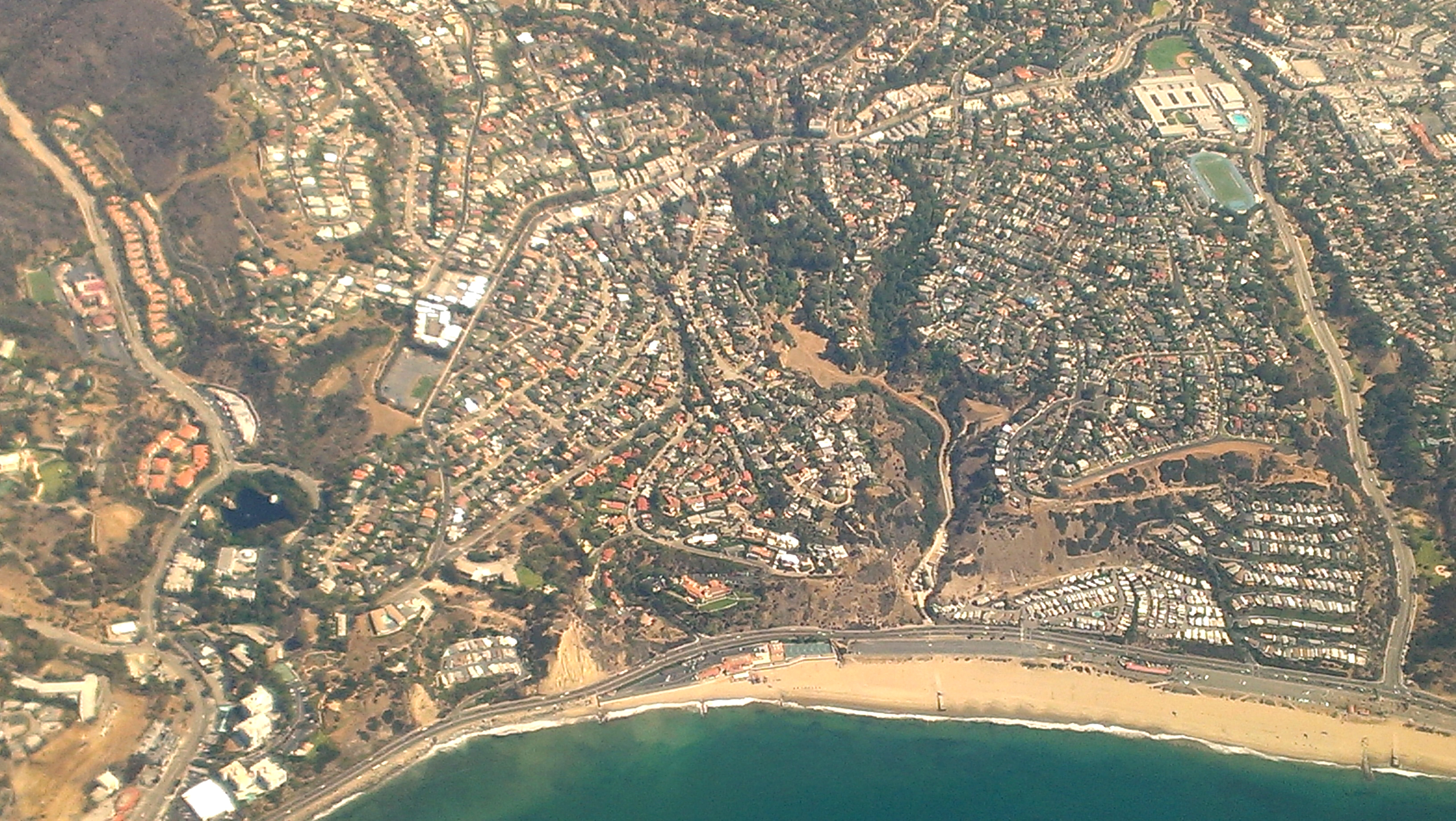
Temescal Canyon can be seen on the far right of this photo
