= Hubert T. Parson =

American businessman

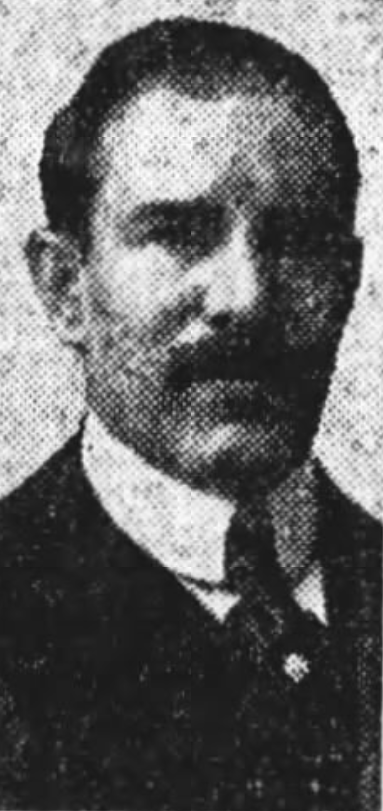
- Parson in 1923

President of the F. W. Woolworth Company
- In office 1919–1932
- Preceded by: Frank Winfield Woolworth
- Succeeded by: Byron D. Miller

Personal details
- Born: Hubert Templeton Parson; September 18, 1872 Toronto, Ontario
- Died: July 9, 1940 (aged 67) New York City, New York, U.S.
- Resting place: Green-Wood Cemetery
- Spouse: Maysie Adelaide Gasque (m. 1893)
- Education: Boys High School

Hubert Templeton Parson (September 18, 1872 – July 9, 1940) was an American businessman who served as president of the F. W. Woolworth Company.

== Early life ==
Parson was born on September 18, 1872, in Toronto, Ontario. He was a son of Eliza S. (née McGibben) Parson and Henry Edwin Parson, a former oil operator who made a fortune but lost it due to fires and the discovery of oil in Oil City, Pennsylvania. He had two brothers, Charles Parson (of Missoula, Montana) and Stuart Parson (of Bronxville, New York).

When he was seven years old, his parents brought him to Brooklyn. After receiving his education at the Boys High School in Brooklyn, where he completed a course in bookkeeping.

== Career ==
This office carries with it the responsibilities of the general management and oversight of the business, and I count on every man in the business to give me his full support and co-operation so that I can administer this office to the best interest of the business and every man in it. I propose to give the best that is in me to the administration of this great business with which I have been associated for the past twenty-seven years, but no one man can make this business a success.

— Parson's message to the stores upon his promotion to President, June 13, 1919

After his graduation from the Boys High School, Parson worked several jobs in Brooklyn, first with the Atlantic Chemical Company, then, at age 19, becoming a partner in a chicory importing business.

In the spring of 1892, Parson began working with the F. W. Woolworth Company as a $12 a week bookkeeper, obtaining that position through a 5-cent "want ad" when the Woolworth executive staff consisted of only four men. In 1905, he became treasurer, and eventually, after the death of Carson Peck in 1916, he became general manager and vice president of the Woolworth Company in 1917.

Following the death of Frank W. Woolworth in 1919, Parson (who was always thought of by Woolworth as the son he never had) served as the second president of the company before retiring in 1932 (just before the company's 60-year age limit), responsible for the founding of over 2,000 stores.

== Personal life ==
In 1893, Parson was married to Maysie Adelaide Gasque (d. 1956). Maysie's brother, Clarence Warren Gasque was the director of Woolworth's in England. Parson walked Clarence's daughter, Maysie Gasque, down the aisle at her July 1930 wedding to Roland Robinson (later 1st Baron Martonmere) at St Margaret's Church, Westminster where Princess Mariza Chavchavadze was a bridesmaid. Maysie and Roland were the parents of Loretta Anne Robinson, who later married Edward S. Rogers Jr., the president and CEO of Rogers Communications Inc.

Parson died at New York Hospital in New York City on July 9, 1940. After a service at Fairchild Chapel, he was buried at Green-Wood Cemetery in Brooklyn. His widow, who was then living at 998 Fifth Avenue, died in May 1956.

=== Residences ===
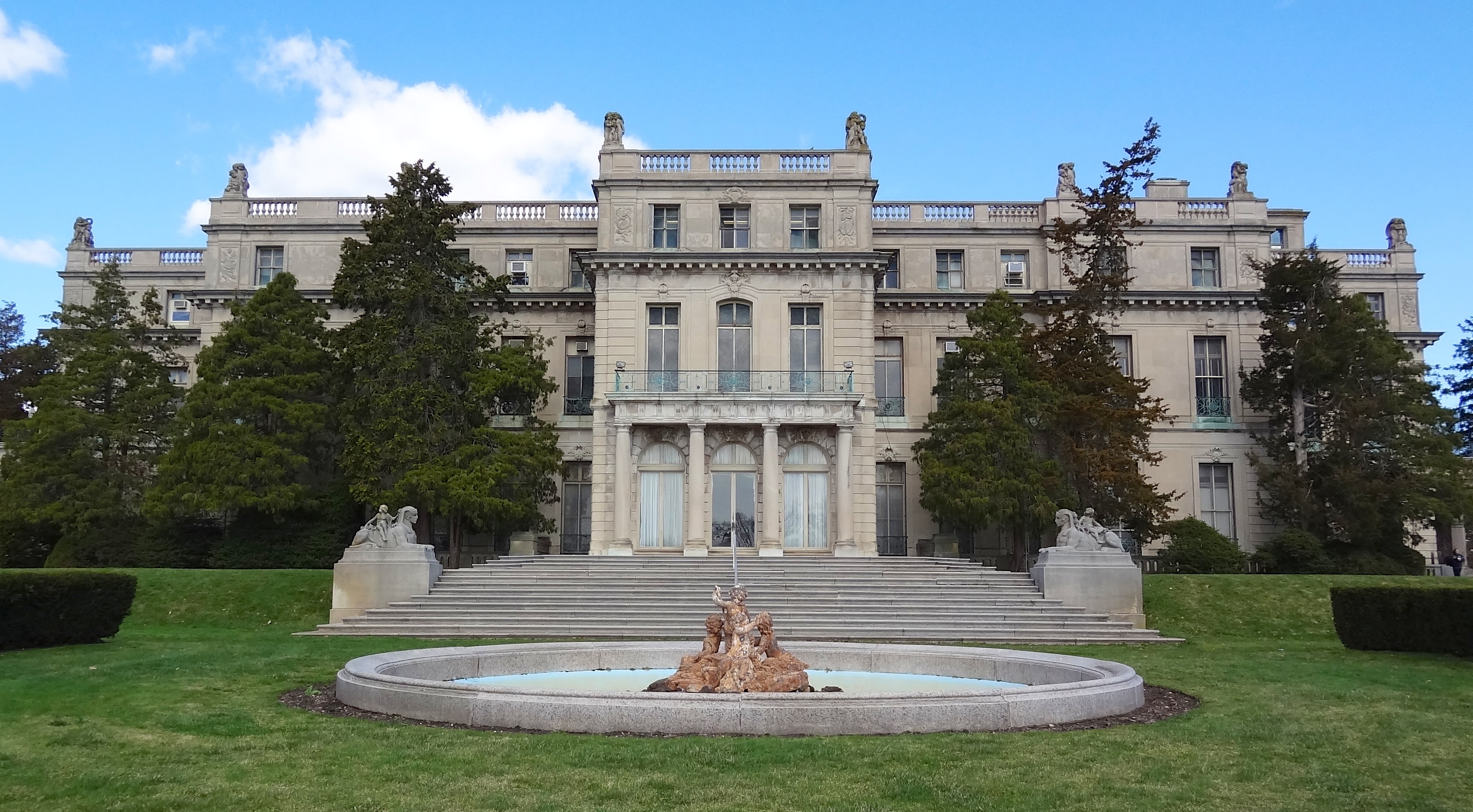
Shadow Lawn, Parson's home in West Long Branch, New Jersey

The Parsons owned a house down the street from F.W Woolworth (who was at 990 Park Avenue) at 1071 Fifth Avenue in New York (today the site of the Solomon R. Guggenheim Museum) and a large home at 72 Avenue Foch in Paris, which later was confiscated by the Nazis and became the base of operations for the Gestapo in Paris. At the time of his death, they were residing at 420 Park Avenue.

In 1918, Parson bought Shadow Lawn, a colonial, wood-frame structure mansion in West Long Branch, New Jersey (not far from the resort town of Asbury Park), from Joseph B. Greenhut, head of the Siegel-Cooper Company for $800,000 in cash plus a $150,000 mortgage. The mansion, which was originally built in 1903 for John A. McCall (president of the New York Life Insurance Company), contained fifty-two rooms and was the subject of a $1 million renovation by Parson after he acquired it. During the 1916 presidential campaign, Greenhut had loaned Shadow Lawn to President Woodrow Wilson, who used the mansion as his Summer White House. In 1927, the home was destroyed by a fire and, in 1929, Parson built a new mansion which contained 130 rooms and cost a reported $10.5 million to build. The home was designed by Philadelphia architect Horace Trumbauer in the American Beaux-Arts style and built by Thompson-Starrett Company of New York, who built the Woolworth Building in New York City. The exterior gardens were by Achille Duchêne and the interior design was crafted by Julian Abele, one of the first professionally trained African American architects in the United States. Parson and his wife, along with her mother and sister (who worked in the New York office of Woolworth), all lived at Shadow Lawn.

In 1939, Parson, who was financially ruined by the Great Depression, lost Shadow Lawn to the town for nonpayment of $132,000 in taxes. The home later served as a military hospital and the site of a private school before Monmouth University acquired it in 1955 for $350,000.
