= Staccato (disambiguation) =

Staccato is a form of musical articulation, signifying an unconnected note.

Staccato may also refer to:

- The Five Man Electrical Band, a Canadian rock group formerly known as The Staccatos
- Staccato lightning, a form of lightning
- Staccato cough, a type of cough
- Johnny Staccato, an American private detective series and its title character
- Mr. Staccato, a character in The Secret Order of the Gumm Street Girls
