= Shadow Lawn (New Jersey) =

Historic house in New Jersey, United States

- U.S. National Register of Historic Places
- U.S. National Historic Landmark
- New Jersey Register of Historic Places
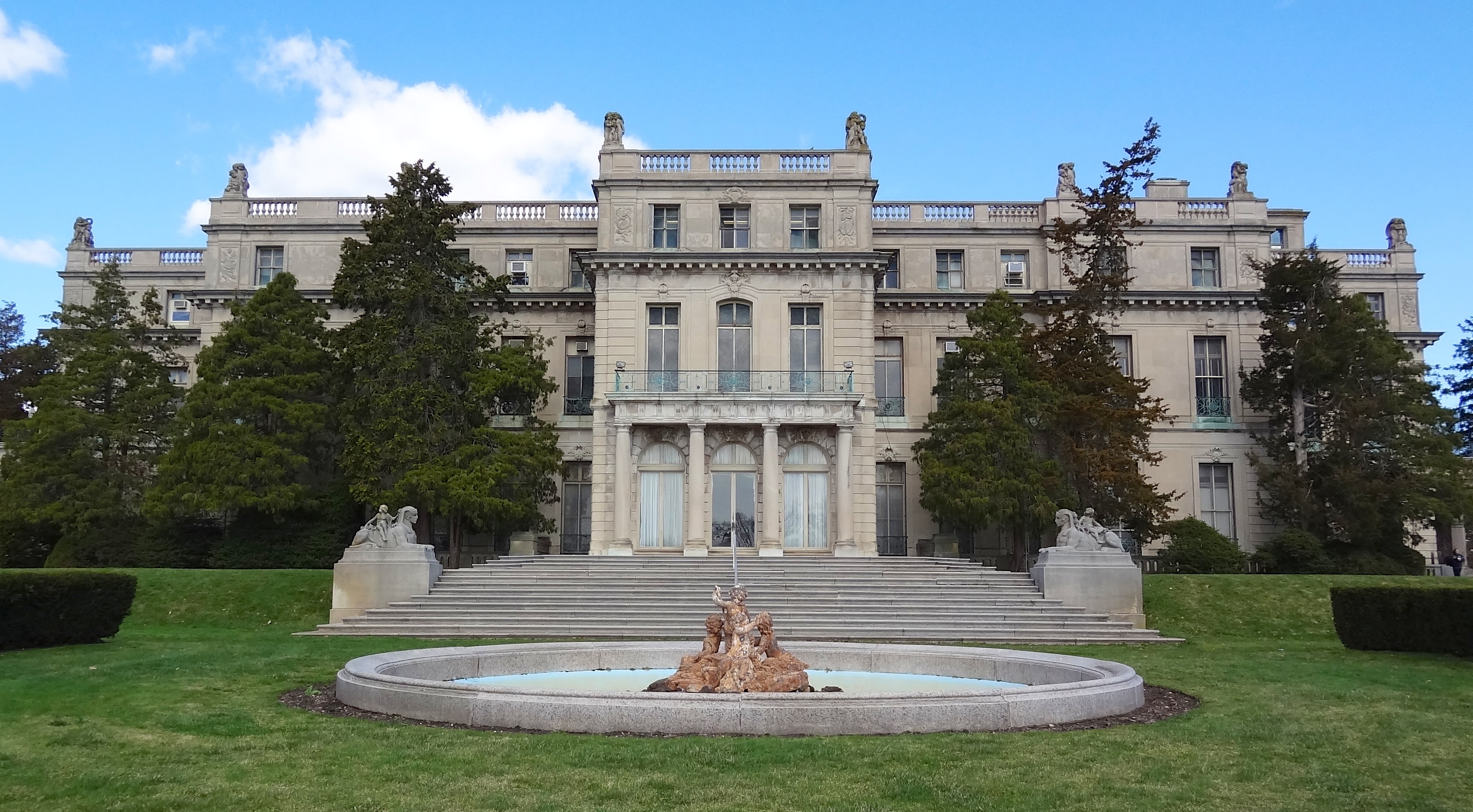
- The Great Hall at Shadow Lawn

- Location within Monmouth County, New Jersey Location within New Jersey Location within the United States
- Location: Cedar and Norwood Avenues, West Long Branch, New Jersey
- Coordinates: 40°16′46″N 74°0′19″W
- Area: less than one acre
- Built: 1927
- Built by: Thompson–Starrett Co.
- Architect: Horace Trumbauer, Julian Abele
- Architectural style: Beaux Arts; French chateau; Italian Renaissance
- NRHP reference No.: 78001780
- NJRHP No.: 2084

Significant dates
- Added to NRHP: March 28, 1978
- Designated NHL: February 4, 1985
- Designated NJRHP: August 19, 1977

Shadow Lawn is a historic building on the campus of Monmouth University in West Long Branch, Monmouth County, New Jersey, United States. Built in 1927 for Hubert T. Parson, president of the F.W. Woolworth Company, it was one of the last large estate houses to be built before the Great Depression. It was designated a National Historic Landmark in 1985 for its architecture.

== Architecture ==
Shadow Lawn is a large masonry building, three stories in height, with a main facade that is over 300 feet (91 m) wide. A three-bay section projects at the center of the main (south) facade, with a Doric columned single-story portico at its front. A dentillated cornice separates the second and third floors, and a balustrade surrounds the roof, with sculptures mounted on some of the corner columns.

The interior has more than 100 rooms, with lavishly appointed public spaces. An interior courtyard is 100 feet (30 m) long, with a covering skylight; its walls are adorned with plaster pilasters and arched window openings. The main hall features a well-concealed Aeolian Skinner organ, and the basement houses a bowling alley that saw little use during the Parsons' ownership.

== History ==
The Shadow Lawn estate was first developed in the early 20th century by John A. McCall, president of the New York Life Insurance Company. Its main house was a 52-room mansion, which in 1916 served as the summer White House for President Woodrow Wilson. Wilson planned many aspects of his reelection campaign from that house.

In 1918, the estate was purchased by Hubert T. Parson, president of the F.W. Woolworth Company. The main house was destroyed by fire in 1927, after which Parson and his wife Maysie immediately embarked on building an ostentatious replacement. Sparing no expense, they retained the noted Gilded Age architect Horace Trumbauer, and the design of the present building is credited to Trumbauer and his assistant, Julian Abele. The exterior garden landscape was designed by the French landscape architect Achille Duchêne.

By the time the building was complete, the Parsons had spent more than $10 million. They had continued work despite the onset of the Great Depression, which eventually ruined their finances. Unable to recoup the expenditures made on Shadow Lawn by selling it, the property was taken by the town for $100 in 1939.

After housing a girls' school for a time, the property became part of Monmouth University in 1956. Shadow Lawn was listed on the National Register of Historic Places in 1978 for its significance in art, architecture, and landscape design. It was declared a National Historic Landmark in 1985.

Shadow Lawn was used to portray the mansion of Oliver Warbucks (Albert Finney) in the 1982 film Annie.

After Monmouth's acquisition of the property, the current building's name was changed from Shadow Lawn to Woodrow Wilson Hall, honoring Wilson's occupation of its predecessor. In 2020, the building was renamed to the Great Hall at Shadow Lawn, with the university citing Wilson's racist policies for the change.

== See also ==
- List of residences of presidents of the United States
- List of National Historic Landmarks in New Jersey
- National Register of Historic Places listings in Monmouth County, New Jersey
