= Thompson–Starrett Company =

American construction and engineering firm

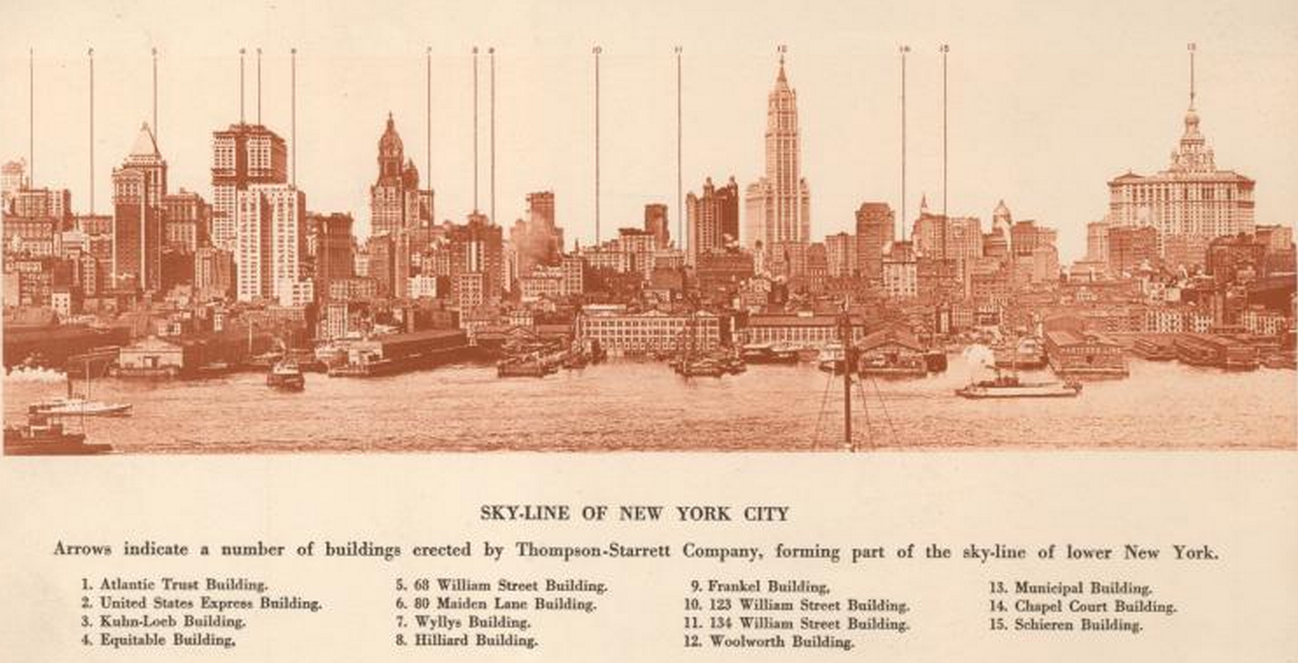
- New York skyline, 1920, with key to buildings erected by Thompson–Starrett Co.
- Formerly: TST Industries, Inc.
- Industry: Construction contracting and engineering, later manufacturing
- Founded: 1899
- Founder: Henry Soffe Thompson; Theodore Starrett
- Defunct: June 1968
- Fate: Merged with Elgin National Watch Company
- Successor: Elgin National Industries
- Headquarters: New York City, U.S.
- Subsidiaries: Roberts & Schaefer Company; Federal Scientific Corporation

Thompson–Starrett Co. was an American construction contracting and engineering firm based in New York City that operated from 1899 until 1968.

During the company's first 30 years, it was a pioneer in the construction of skyscrapers and one of the first companies to develop a national practice involving large-scale construction projects. At least six of the company's works built between 1905 and 1923 have been designated as National Historic Landmarks, including the Woolworth Building (the tallest skyscraper in the world from 1913 to 1930), the Equitable Building in Manhattan, the former General Motors Building in Detroit, the Sears, Roebuck and Company Complex in Chicago, the American Stock Exchange Building in Lower Manhattan, and the John D. Rockefeller Estate at Pocantico Hills.

The company continued to operate until 1968. Its later works include Fairlington in Arlington, Virginia, the largest housing project financed by the Defense Homes Corporation during World War II, and the Ford Magic Skyway and New York State Pavilions for the 1964 New York World's Fair. By 1967, the company had diversified into other areas, and in 1968, the company was merged with the Elgin Watch Company to form Elgin National Industries.

== History ==
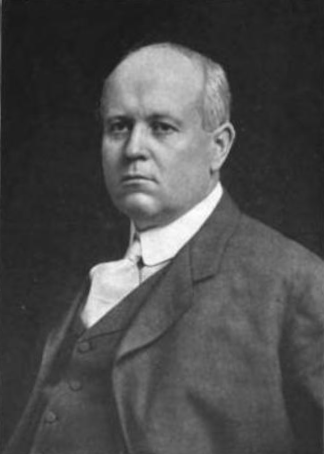
Theodore Starrett (1865–1917)

Thompson–Starrett was founded in 1899 by Henry Soffe Thompson and Theodore Starrett and continued in operation until 1968. The company became a pioneer in the construction of skyscrapers in the United States. Thompson sold his interest in the firm in approximately 1902, and Starrett continued the company as its president. Thompson–Starrett and the George A. Fuller Company were the first American construction firms to build large projects, including skyscrapers, on a national basis. By 1902, the two companies were involved in the construction of most of New York's skyscrapers and faced allegations that they had become a "Skyscraper Trust."

After Theodore Starrett retired, Louis J. Horowitz, an immigrant from Russia, became the president of Thompson–Starrett. He had been the company's general manager since 1905. In 1911, Horowitz sought to allay concerns that New York was becoming overbuilt. He noted that Thompson–Starrett had more than $40 million in projects underway and was "not suffering for lack of business." Although Leo J. Fischer took over as the company's president in 1928, Horowitz remained chairman of the board and led the company for 24 years until his retirement in 1934. In 1937, Simon & Schuster published Horowitz's autobiography which was titled, "The Towers of New York." The review of the book in The New York Times carried the headline, "He Has Changed Manhattan's Profile."

After Horowitz retired in 1934, Leo J. Fischer became the company's chairman, holding that position until 1947. Fischer joined the company in 1903 after a stint with the George A. Fuller Company and spent 45 years at Thompson–Starrett. Under Fischer's leadership, the company played a part in the construction of the Grand Coulee Dam in the 1930s. Other large projects undertaken under Fischer's leadership included the United States Naval Ammunition Depot at Charleston, West Virginia. The company also built the $31 million Fairlington project in Arlington, Virginia, the largest housing project financed by the Defense Homes Corporation during World War II. From 1903 to 1947, Thompson–Starrett reportedly "performed contracts worth one billion dollars."

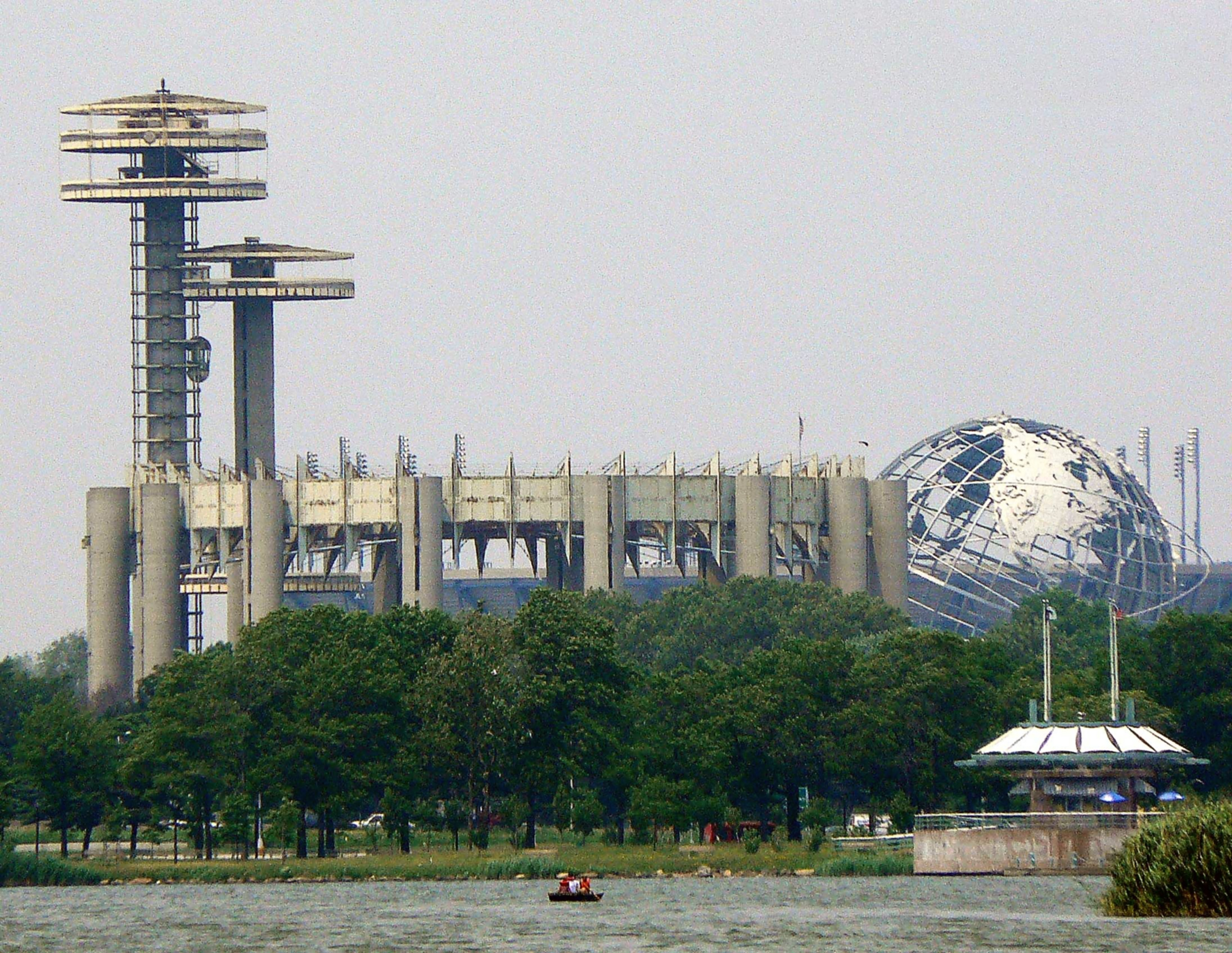
The New York State Pavilion was built by the company for the 1964 New York World's Fair.

In 1947, a proxy battle developed for control of the company. The company's stockholders "voted overwhelmingly to oust the old management," and an opposition faction led by Joseph McGoldrick assumed control of the board of directors in November 1947. At that time, General Donald B. Adams was appointed as the company's president with McGoldrick as the board chairman. The dissident group pointed to "the long record of operating losses and the failure to pay any dividends at all since 1931" as the reason for the shakeup.

After 50 years of stable management under Theodore Starrett, Louis Horowitz, and Leo Fischer, the company experienced rapid turnover in its senior management, with at least six different persons serving as the company's president from 1947 to 1960. In 1949, J. R. Van Raalte was elected president of the company succeeding Gen. Adams who became the chairman of the company's board. In 1954, John E. Kalinka succeeded Van Raalte as president and chief executive officer of the company. Also in 1954, the company acquired Roberts & Schaefer Company of Chicago, which thereafter operated as a division of Thompson–Starrett. Following Kalinka's retirement at the end of 1957, Robert Zaborowski took over as the company's president. In 1960, M. John Mee was appointed as the president of the Thompson–Starrett Construction Company, which was at that time "the general division" of Thompson–Starrett Company. The company built the Ford Magic Skyway and New York State Pavilions for the 1964 New York World's Fair.

In 1967, the brokerage firm Weis, Voisin, Cannon, Inc., purchased a substantial block of Thompson–Starrett's stock, and L. Alan Shafler was elected president and chief executive officer. In the fall of 1967, Herbert S. Cannon, the president of Weis, Voisin, had taken over as the chairman of Thompson–Starrett, and the company had entered the scientific instrumentation industry by purchasing Federal Scientific Corporation. By 1968, Thompson–Starrett had been renamed TST Industries, Inc., and had become a diversified manufacturing and construction concern with interests in a watch manufacturer and specializing in the construction of television distribution and scientific instruments. In June 1968, the company was then merged with the Elgin Watch Company to form Elgin National Industries led by Herbert S. Cannon.

== Historic designations ==
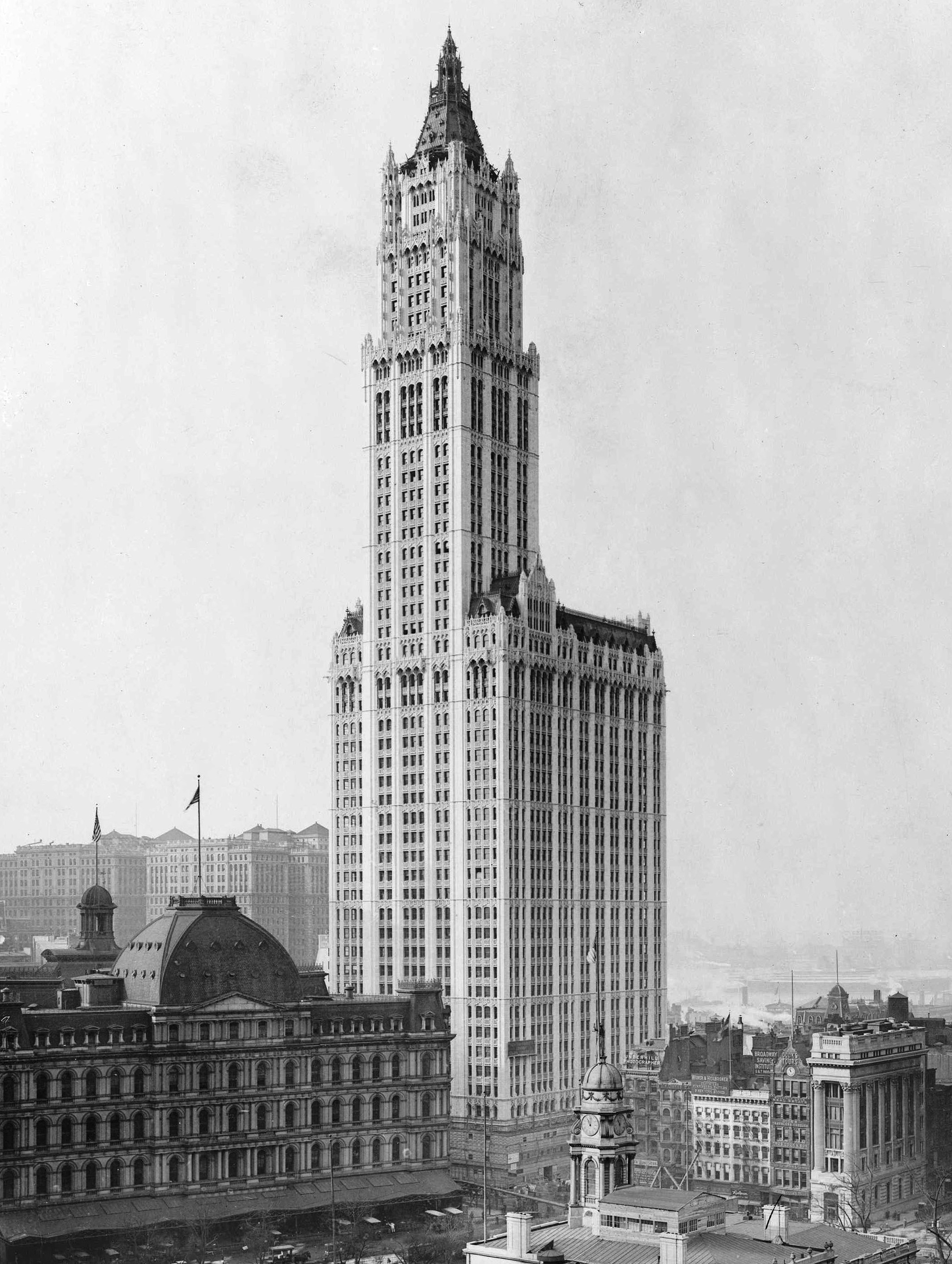
Woolworth Building

A number of Thompson–Starrett's works are listed on the U.S. National Register of Historic Places. The firm's works include the Woolworth Building, which was the tallest skyscraper in the world from 1913 to 1930. At least seven buildings erected by the firm have received National Historic Landmark designation, including the Woolworth Building, the Equitable Building in Lower Manhattan (completed in 1915), the former General Motors Building in Detroit (built 1919–1923), the Sears, Roebuck and Company Complex in Chicago (completed 1905), the American Stock Exchange Building in Lower Manhattan (completed 1921), Kykuit (1913), the John D. Rockefeller Estate at Pocantico Hills, New York, and Shadow Lawn (built 1928–1930), now known as Woodrow Wilson Hall, located on the campus of Monmouth University, West Long Branch, New Jersey.

== Notable works ==
=== New York City ===
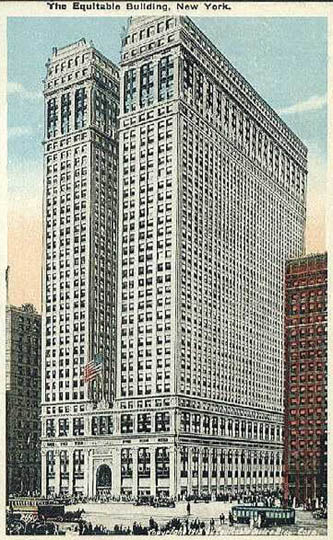
Equitable Building

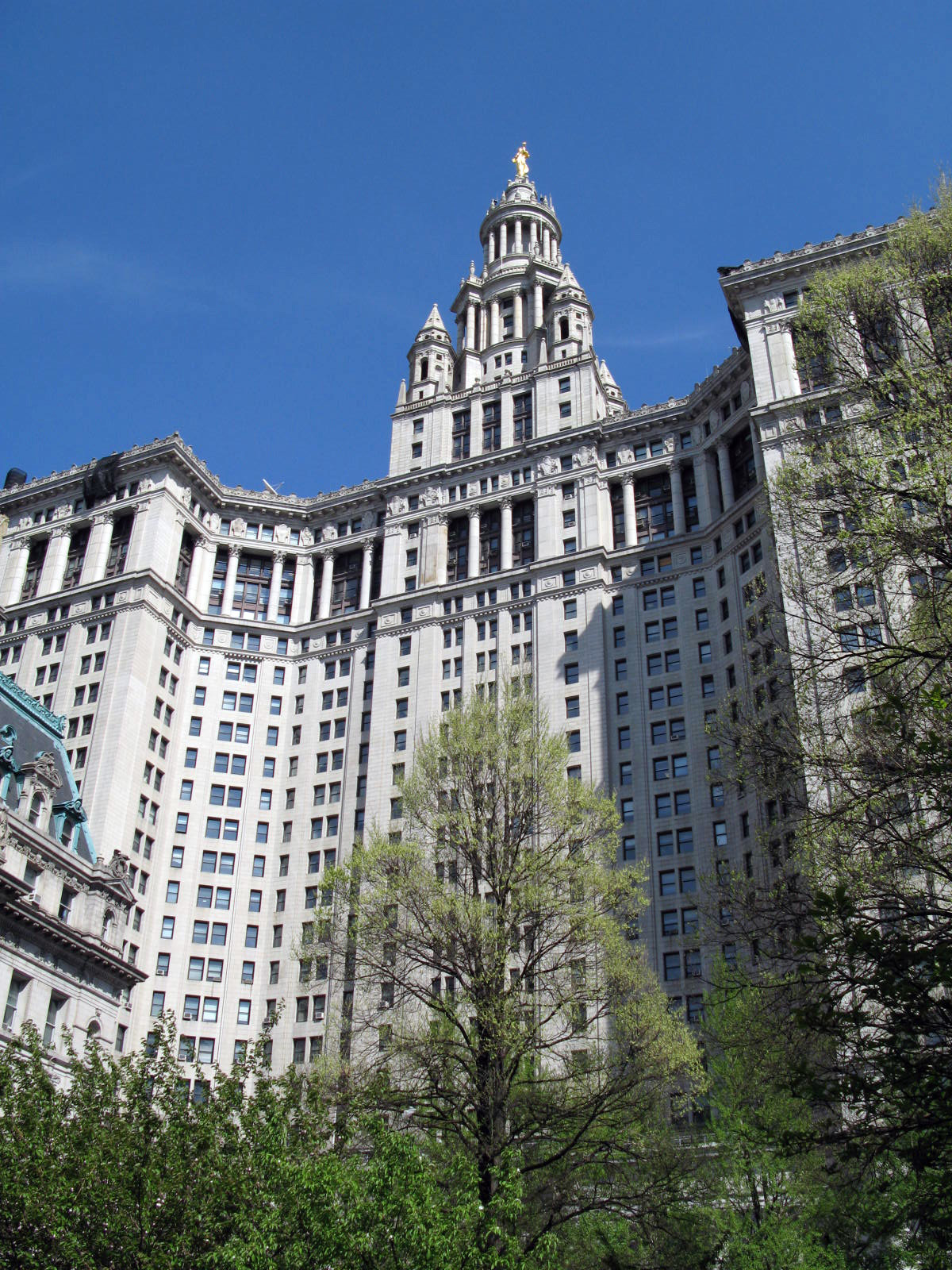
Manhattan Municipal Building

Works in New York City include:

- Algonquin Hotel (1902-1903), 59 West 44th Street, Manhattan, New York, New York, designated as a New York City Landmark, a National Literary Landmark, and home of the Algonquin Round Table.
- American Stock Exchange Building (1921), 86 Trinity Pl., New York, New York, NRHP-listed
- Equitable Building (1915), 120 Broadway, New York, New York, NRHP-listed
- Gimbel Brothers Department Store (1909-1910), Broadway and Thirty-Third Street, Manhattan, New York, New York
- Hotel Claridge (built 1910-1911, demolished 1972), Times Square, Manhattan, New York, New York
- Hotel McAlpin (1912), corner of Broadway and 34th Street, Manhattan, New York City (the largest hotel in the world when it opened)
- New York Municipal Building (1907-1914), later known as the Manhattan Municipal Building, 1 Centre Street, New York, New York, NRHP-listed
- New York State Pavilion, Flushing Meadows – Corona Park, Flushing, New York, NRHP-listed
- The Roosevelt Hotel (1924), 45 East 45th Street, Manhattan, New York, New York
- St. Regis New York (1904), 2 East 55th St., New York, New York
- Waldorf-Astoria Hotel (1931), 301 Park Avenue, Manhattan, New York, New York
- Woolworth Building (1910-1913), 233 Broadway, Manhattan, New York, New York, a National Historic Landmark

=== Chicago ===
Works in Chicago include:

- Field Museum of Natural History, 1400 S. Lake Shore Drive, Chicago, Illinois, NRHP-listed
- The Palmer House (1923-1925), 17 E. Monroe Street Chicago, Illinois, designated as a Chicago Landmark
- Sears, Roebuck and Company Complex (1905), 925 S. Homan Ave., Chicago, Illinois, NRHP-listed

=== Elsewhere ===
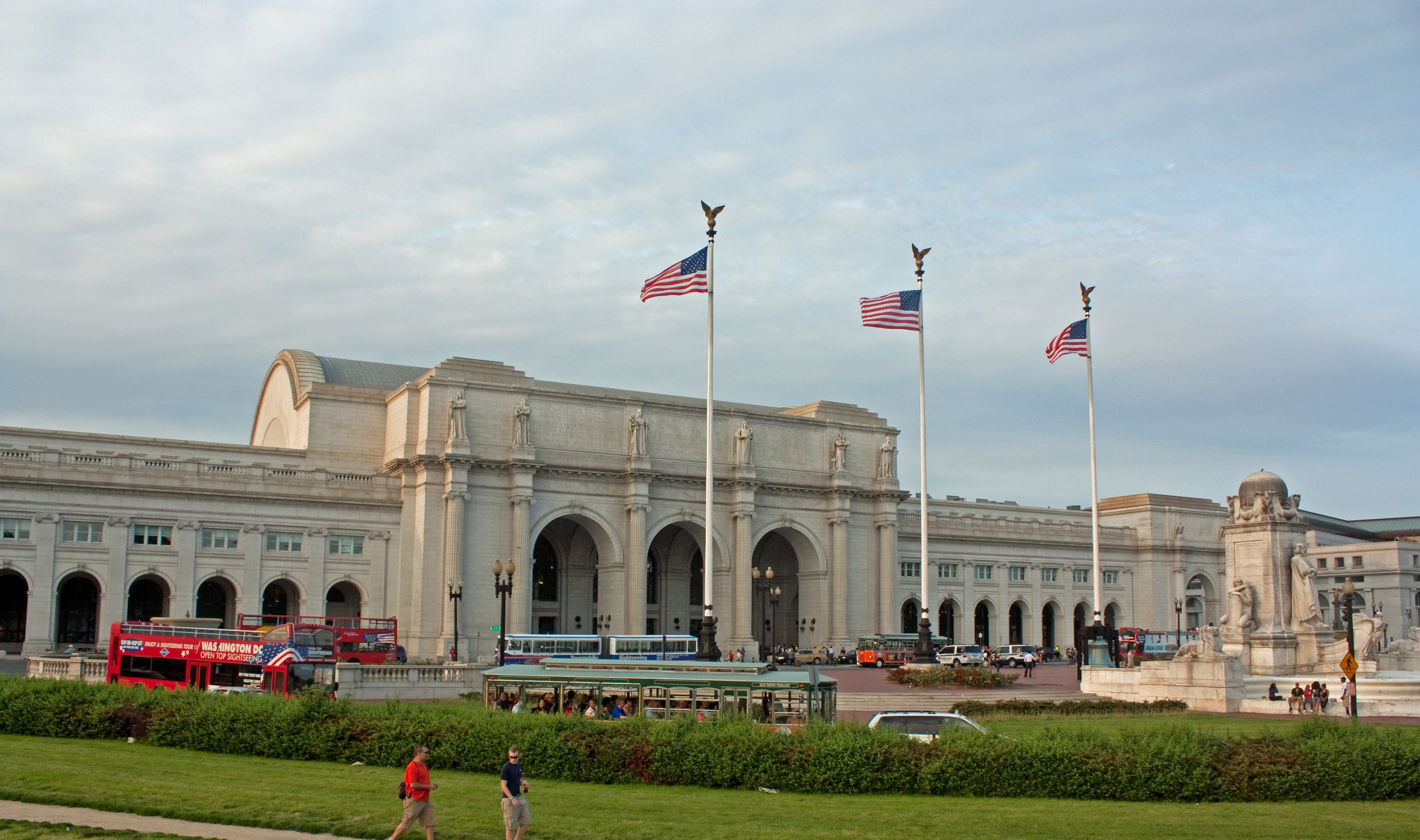
Union Station

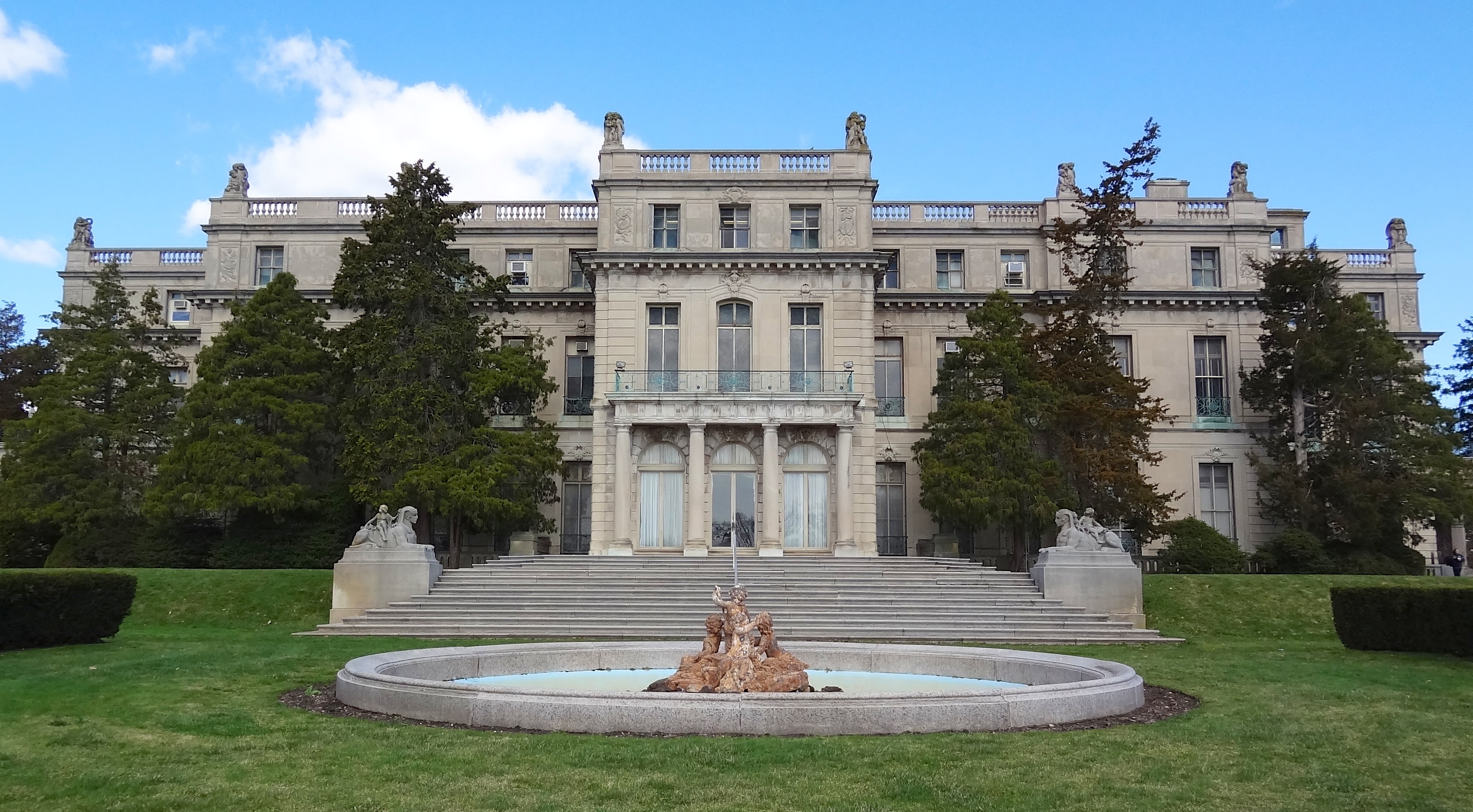
Shadow Lawn, now known as Woodrow Wilson Hall

Works elsewhere include:

- Continental Trust Company Building (1900), now known as One Calvert Plaza, 1 S. Calvert St., Baltimore, Maryland, NRHP-listed
- Fairlington, Arlington, Virginia, NRHP-listed
- General Motors Building (1919-1923), now known as Cadillac Place, 3044 W. Grand Blvd., Detroit, Michigan, NRHP-listed
- Hahn Building, Newark, New Jersey
- Kykuit (1913), also known as the John D. Rockefeller Estate, 200 Lake Rd., Pocantico Hills, Mt. Pleasant, New York
- Mainstreet Theatre (1921), 1400 Main St., Kansas City, Missouri, NRHP-listed
- National Town and Country Club (1929), now known as Fenn Tower, 2401 Euclid Ave., Cleveland, Ohio, NRHP-listed
- O'Shaughnessy Dam and Bridge (1922-1925), Co. Rd. 126 between OH 257 and 745, Shawnee Hills, Delaware County, Ohio, NRHP-listed
- Princeton University (Princeton gymnasium, Little dormitory, Blair dormitory, and expansion of Little Hall), Princeton, New Jersey
- Shadow Lawn (1928-1930), now known as Woodrow Wilson Hall at Monmouth University, West Long Branch, New Jersey, NRHP & NHL Listed
- SOO Line terminal elevator, Minneapolis, Minnesota
- Union Station, 50 Massachusetts Avenue NE, Washington, DC, NRHP-listed
- Yeon Building (1911), 522 SW. Fifth Ave., Portland, Oregon, NRHP-listed
