= West Long Branch, New Jersey =

Borough in New Jersey, US

- Borough
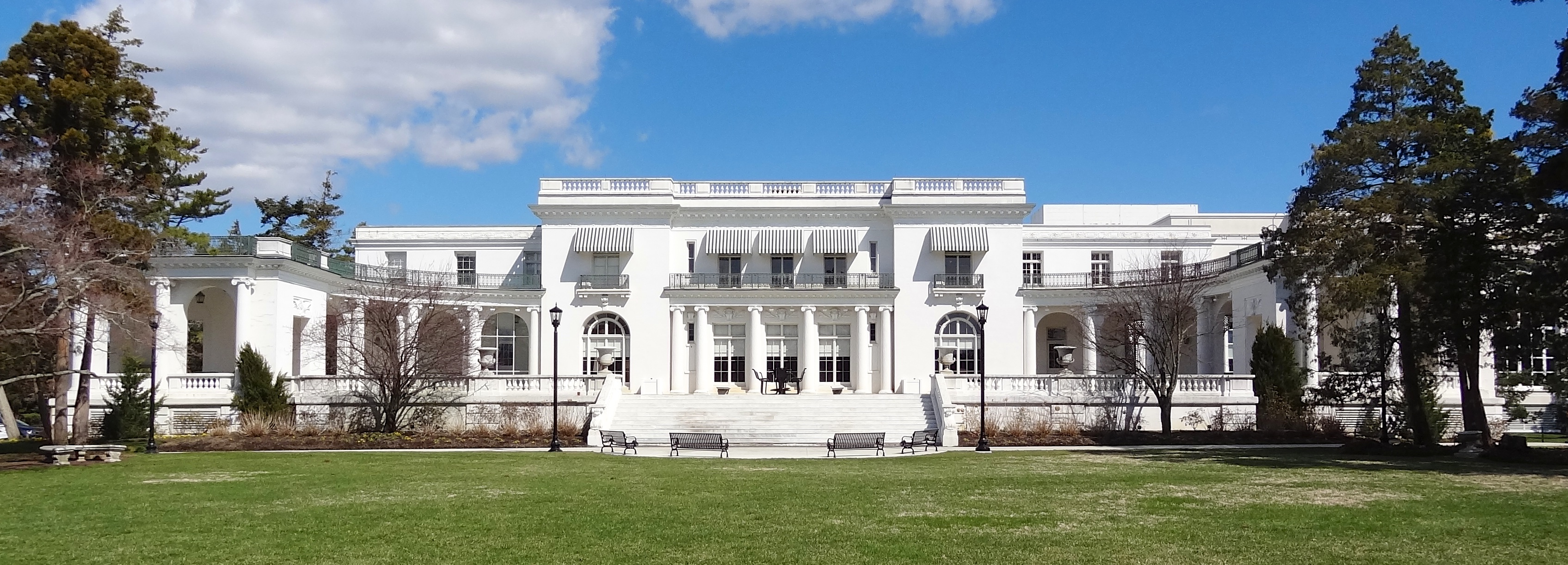
- Murry Guggenheim House

- Seal

- Location of West Long Branch in Monmouth County highlighted in red (left). Inset map: Location of Monmouth County in New Jersey highlighted in orange (right).

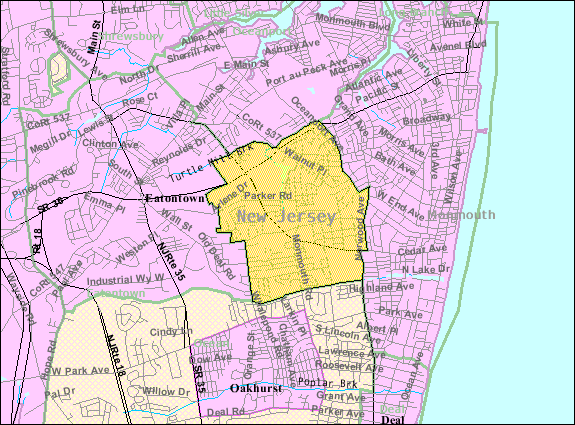
- Census Bureau map of West Long Branch, New Jersey

- Location in Monmouth County Location in New Jersey Location in the United States
- Coordinates: 40.287904°N 74.020019°W
- Country: United States
- State: New Jersey
- County: Monmouth
- Incorporated: May 5, 1908

Government
  - Type: Borough
  - Body: Borough Council
  - Mayor: Janet W. Tucci (R, term ends December 31, 2026)
  - Administrator: Jason W. Gonter
  - Municipal clerk: Carolina Kelly

Area
  - Total: 2.89 sq mi (7.49 km^{2})
  - Land: 2.86 sq mi (7.40 km^{2})
  - Water: 0.035 sq mi (0.09 km^{2}) 1.25%
  - Rank: 342nd of 565 in state 23rd of 53 in county
- Elevation: 26 ft (7.9 m)

Population (2020)
  - Total: 8,587
  - Estimate (2023): 8,555
  - Rank: 279th of 565 in state 22nd of 53 in county
  - Density: 3,006.7/sq mi (1,160.9/km^{2})
  - Rank: 217th of 565 in state 25th of 53 in county
- Time zone: UTC−05:00 (Eastern (EST))
  - Summer (DST): UTC−04:00 (Eastern (EDT))
- ZIP Code: 07764
- Area codes: 732 and 908 (cell)
- FIPS code: 3402579310
- GNIS feature ID: 0885437
- Website: www.westlongbranch.org

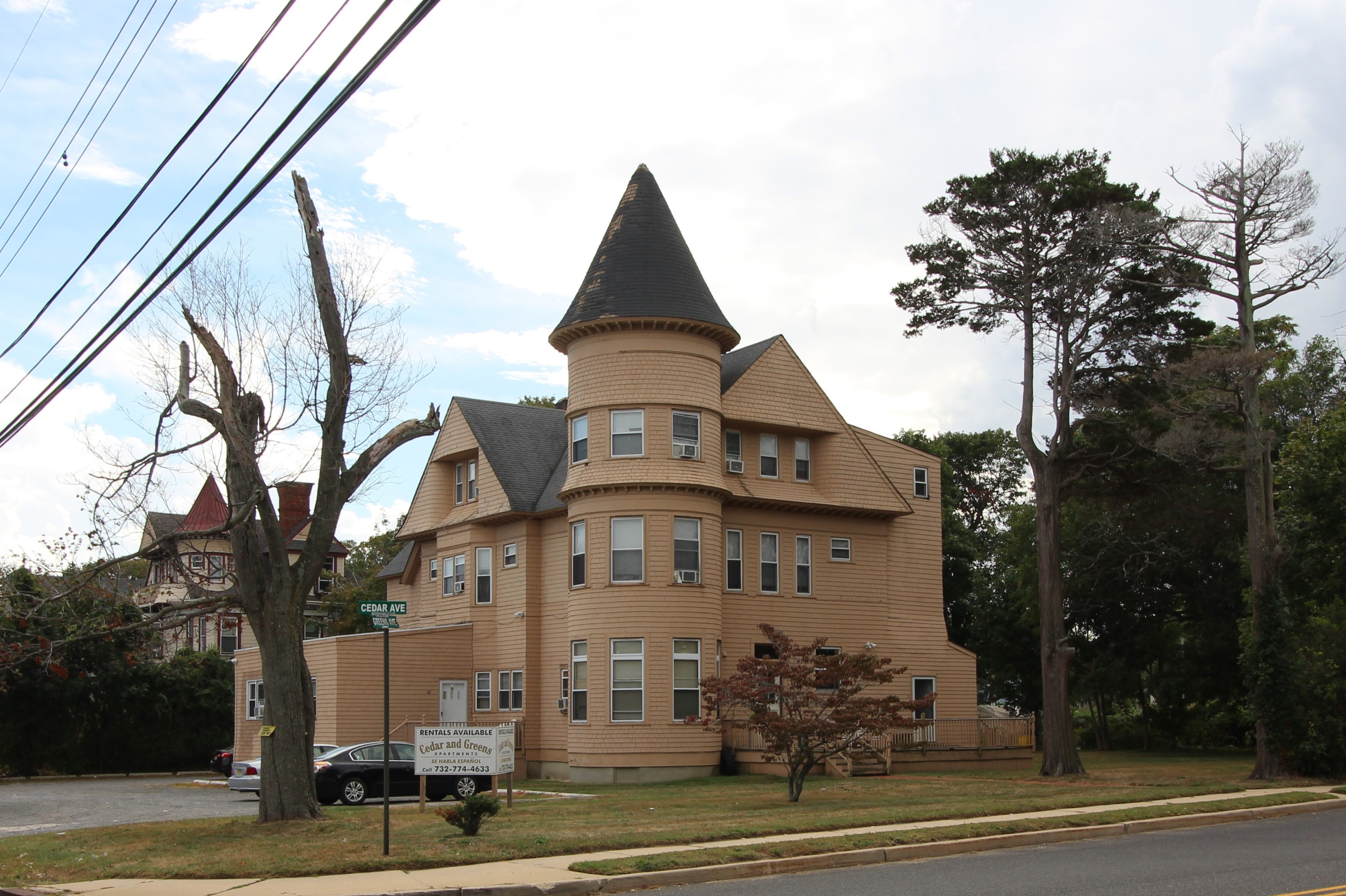
A typically large estate home on Cedar Avenue in West Long Branch

West Long Branch is a borough situated within the Jersey Shore region, in Monmouth County, in the U.S. state of New Jersey. As of the 2020 United States census, the borough's population was 8,587, its highest decennial count ever and an increase of 490 (+6.1%) from the 2010 census count of 8,097, which in turn reflected a decline of 161 (−1.9%) from the 8,258 counted in the 2000 census. West Long Branch is the home of Monmouth University.

== History ==
Prior to being called West Long Branch, the area had been called Mechanicsville from the 18th century through the Civil War, and then Branchburg in the 1870s. The name West Long Branch appears in the 1889 Wolverton Atlas of Monmouth County, and seems to have derived its name from its proximity to a section of the Shrewsbury River.

In 1908, the residents of what was the West Long Branch section of Eatontown thought that they were not getting a fair return on their taxes. A request was made that the West Long Branch section be separated from Eatontown. The Township of Eatontown strongly resisted as there were several large estates in the West Long Branch section that were a source of considerable tax revenues. An act of the New Jersey Legislature was passed on April 7, 1908, and the Monmouth County Board of Chosen Freeholders authorized an election. On May 5, 1908, a referendum was held in West Long Branch, with voters approving the separation. The borough takes its name from Long Branch, which in turn takes its name from the "long branch" or south branch of the Shrewsbury River.

== Geography ==
According to the United States Census Bureau, the borough had a total area of 2.89 square miles (7.49 km^{2}), including 2.86 square miles (7.40 km^{2}) of land and 0.04 square miles (0.09 km^{2}) of water (1.25%).

Unincorporated communities, localities and place names located partially or completely within the borough include Norwood Park.

The borough borders the Monmouth County municipalities of Eatontown, Long Branch, Ocean Township and Oceanport.

=== Climate ===
Climate data for West Long Branch
Month	Jan	Feb	Mar	Apr	May	Jun	Jul	Aug	Sep	Oct	Nov	Dec	Year
Mean daily maximum °C (°F)	4.3 (39.7)	5.7 (42.3)	9.3 (48.7)	15.1 (59.2)	19.9 (67.8)	24.9 (76.8)	27.8 (82.0)	27.1 (80.8)	23.7 (74.7)	18 (64)	12.3 (54.1)	7.3 (45.1)	16.3 (61.3)
Daily mean °C (°F)	0.7 (33.3)	1.6 (34.9)	5.1 (41.2)	10.6 (51.1)	15.9 (60.6)	21.1 (70.0)	24.3 (75.7)	23.7 (74.7)	20.5 (68.9)	14.6 (58.3)	8.8 (47.8)	4 (39)	12.6 (54.6)
Mean daily minimum °C (°F)	−2.1 (28.2)	−1.5 (29.3)	1.8 (35.2)	7.2 (45.0)	12.7 (54.9)	18.1 (64.6)	21.3 (70.3)	21 (70)	17.8 (64.0)	11.9 (53.4)	6.2 (43.2)	1.5 (34.7)	9.7 (49.4)
Average rainfall mm (inches)	99 (3.9)	88 (3.5)	117 (4.6)	98 (3.9)	97 (3.8)	98 (3.9)	93 (3.7)	108 (4.3)	101 (4.0)	107 (4.2)	85 (3.3)	119 (4.7)	1,210 (47.8)
Average rainy days	7	7	8	8	8	8	8	8	7	7	6	8	90
Average relative humidity (%)	64	62	64	65	70	72	70	71	72	69	68	67	68
Source: Climate-Data.org, altitude: 10

== Demographics ==
Historical population
Census	Pop.	Note	%±
1910	879		—
1920	1,686		91.8%
1930	1,686		0.0%
1940	2,030		20.4%
1950	2,739		34.9%
1960	5,337		94.9%
1970	6,845		28.3%
1980	7,380		7.8%
1990	7,690		4.2%
2000	8,258		7.4%
2010	8,097		−1.9%
2020	8,587		6.1%
2023 (est.)	8,555	▼	−0.4%
Population sources: 1910–1920; 1910 1910–1930 1940–2000; 2000 2010 2020

=== 2020 census ===
As of the 2020 census, West Long Branch had a population of 8,587. The median age was 31.8 years. 18.4% of residents were under the age of 18 and 15.3% of residents were 65 years of age or older. For every 100 females there were 87.2 males, and for every 100 females age 18 and over there were 84.1 males age 18 and over.

100.0% of residents lived in urban areas, while 0.0% lived in rural areas.

There were 2,551 households in West Long Branch, of which 31.8% had children under the age of 18 living in them. Of all households, 57.0% were married-couple households, 13.8% were households with a male householder and no spouse or partner present, and 24.5% were households with a female householder and no spouse or partner present. About 22.4% of all households were made up of individuals and 12.7% had someone living alone who was 65 years of age or older.

There were 2,755 housing units, of which 7.4% were vacant. The homeowner vacancy rate was 0.3% and the rental vacancy rate was 5.0%.

Racial composition as of the 2020 census
Race	Number	Percent
White	6,993	81.4%
Black or African American	302	3.5%
American Indian and Alaska Native	12	0.1%
Asian	145	1.7%
Native Hawaiian and Other Pacific Islander	2	0.0%
Some other race	388	4.5%
Two or more races	745	8.7%
Hispanic or Latino (of any race)	774	9.0%

=== 2010 census ===
The 2010 United States census counted 8,097 people, 2,384 households, and 1,757 families in the borough. The population density was 2,832.9 per square mile (1,093.8/km^{2}). There were 2,528 housing units at an average density of 884.5 per square mile (341.5/km^{2}). The racial makeup was 94.45% (7,648) White, 2.21% (179) Black or African American, 0.06% (5) Native American, 1.19% (96) Asian, 0.01% (1) Pacific Islander, 0.95% (77) from other races, and 1.12% (91) from two or more races. Hispanic or Latino of any race were 5.03% (407) of the population.

Of the 2,384 households, 32.3% had children under the age of 18; 60.0% were married couples living together; 9.8% had a female householder with no husband present and 26.3% were non-families. Of all households, 21.7% were made up of individuals and 12.7% had someone living alone who was 65 years of age or older. The average household size was 2.77 and the average family size was 3.23.

19.6% of the population were under the age of 18, 25.4% from 18 to 24, 16.7% from 25 to 44, 24.7% from 45 to 64, and 13.6% who were 65 years of age or older. The median age was 32.4 years. For every 100 females, the population had 91.2 males. For every 100 females ages 18 and older there were 88.1 males.

The Census Bureau's 2006–2010 American Community Survey showed that (in 2010 inflation-adjusted dollars) median household income was $96,369 (with a margin of error of +/− $15,449) and the median family income was $114,250 (+/− $13,662). Males had a median income of $75,634 (+/− $8,441) versus $49,483 (+/− $5,714) for females. The per capita income for the borough was $32,822 (+/− $3,260). About 5.0% of families and 8.2% of the population were below the poverty line, including 11.0% of those under age 18 and 6.3% of those age 65 or over.

=== 2000 census ===
As of the 2000 United States census there were 8,258 people, 2,448 households, and 1,860 families residing in the borough. The population density was 2,859.9 inhabitants per square mile (1,104.2/km^{2}). There were 2,535 housing units at an average density of 877.9 per square mile (339.0/km^{2}). The racial makeup of the borough was 94.22% White, 2.23% African American, 0.07% Native American, 1.21% Asian, 0.04% Pacific Islander, 0.50% from other races, and 1.73% from two or more races. Hispanic or Latino of any race were 2.92% of the population.

There were 2,448 households, out of which 35.5% had children under the age of 18 living with them, 64.9% were married couples living together, 8.6% had a female householder with no husband present, and 24.0% were non-families. 21.3% of all households were made up of individuals, and 13.3% had someone living alone who was 65 years of age or older. The average household size was 2.77 and the average family size was 3.25.

In the borough the population was spread out, with 21.8% under the age of 18, 22.1% from 18 to 24, 21.1% from 25 to 44, 20.4% from 45 to 64, and 14.6% who were 65 years of age or older. The median age was 34 years. For every 100 females, there were 87.6 males. For every 100 females age 18 and over, there were 84.7 males.

The median income for a household in the borough was $71,852, and the median income for a family was $80,127. Males had a median income of $59,638 versus $34,000 for females. The per capita income for the borough was $27,651. About 3.1% of families and 4.5% of the population were below the poverty line, including 7.0% of those under age 18 and 3.2% of those age 65 or over.

== Government ==
=== Local government ===
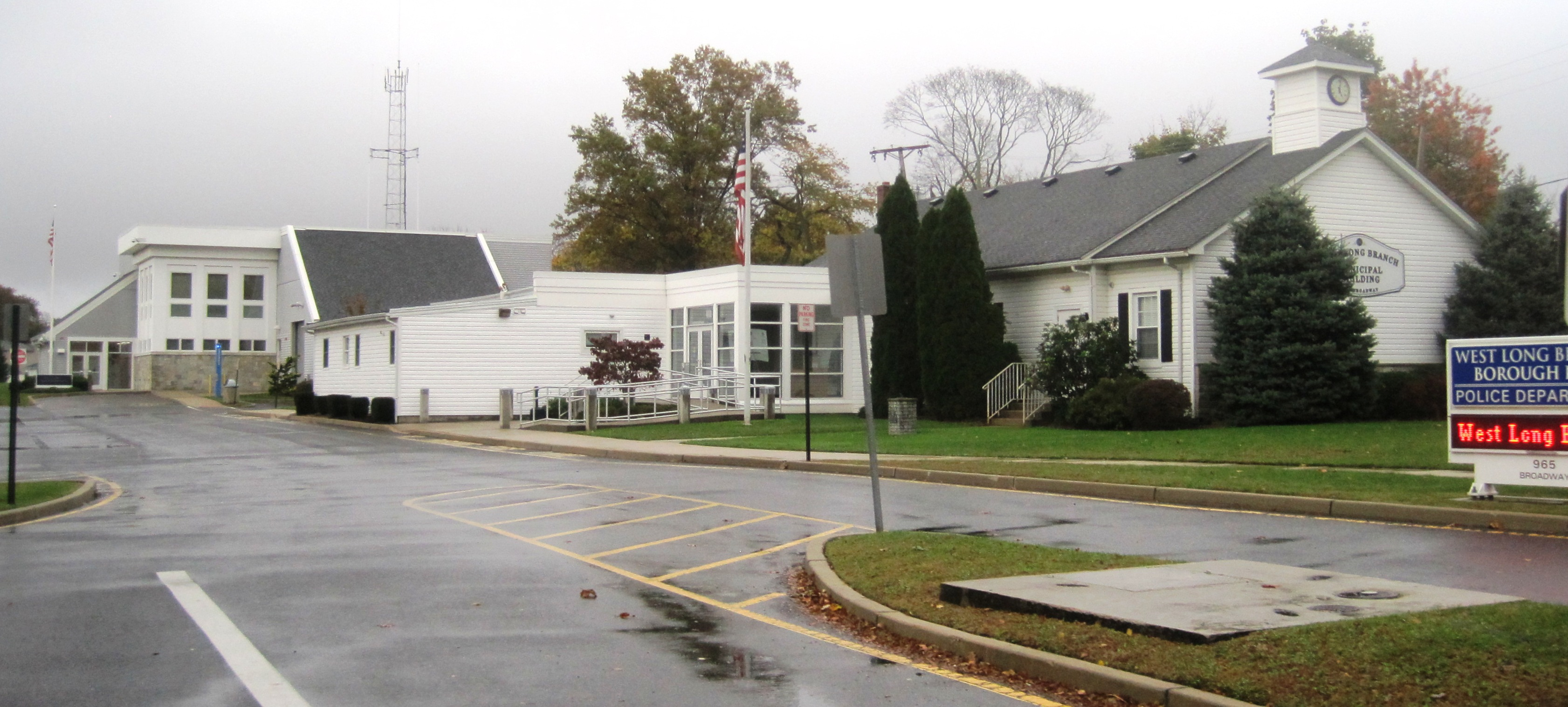
West Long Branch Borough Hall and Police Department

West Long Branch is governed under the borough form of New Jersey municipal government, which is used in 218 municipalities (of the 564) statewide, making it the most common form of government in New Jersey. The governing body is comprised of the mayor and the borough council, with all positions elected at-large on a partisan basis as part of the November general election. The mayor is elected directly by the voters to a four-year term of office. The borough council is comprised of six members elected to serve three-year terms on a staggered basis, with two seats coming up for election each year in a three-year cycle. The borough form of government used by West Long Branch is a "weak mayor / strong council" government in which council members act as the legislative body with the mayor presiding at meetings and voting only in the event of a tie. The mayor can veto ordinances subject to an override by a two-thirds majority vote of the council. The mayor makes committee and liaison assignments for council members, and most appointments are made by the mayor with the advice and consent of the council.

As of 2025, the mayor of the Borough of West Long Branch is Republican Janet W. Tucci, who was first elected as mayor in 2005, and whose current term of office ends December 31, 2026. Members of the West Long Branch Borough Council are Stephen A. Bray (R, 2025), Steven Cioffi (R, 2027), James P. Gomez (R, 2025), John M. Penta Jr. (R, 2027), Barbara Ruane (R, 2026) and Matthew B. Sniffen (R, 2026).

==== Police department ====
The West Long Branch Police Department is responsible for law and traffic enforcement in the Borough of West Long Branch. Its current Chief is Marlowe Botti.

The department has two divisions, Operations and Investigations. The Operations Division consists of Patrol, Traffic, Dispatch, Firearms, Records and Special Services. The Investigations Division is responsible for all criminal investigations.

=== Federal, state and county representation ===
West Long Branch is located in the 6th Congressional District and is part of New Jersey's 13th state legislative district.

For the 119th United States Congress, New Jersey's 6th congressional district is represented by Frank Pallone (D, Long Branch). New Jersey is represented in the United States Senate by Democrats Cory Booker (Newark, term ends 2027) and Andy Kim (Moorestown, term ends 2031).

For the 2026–2027 session, the 13th legislative district of the New Jersey Legislature is represented in the New Jersey Senate by Declan O'Scanlon (R, Little Silver) and in the General Assembly by Vicky Flynn (R, Holmdel Township) and Gerard Scharfenberger (R, Middletown Township).

Monmouth County is governed by a Board of County Commissioners composed of five members who are elected at-large to serve three-year terms of office on a staggered basis, with either one or two seats up for election each year as part of the November general election. At an annual reorganization meeting held in the beginning of January, the board selects one of its members to serve as director and another as deputy director.

As of 2025, Monmouth County's Commissioners are Director Thomas A. Arnone (R, Neptune City, 2025), Susan M. Kiley (R, Hazlet Township, 2027), Erik Anderson (R, Shrewsbury, 2026), Nick DiRocco (R, Wall Township, 2025), and Deputy Director Ross F. Licitra (R, Marlboro Township, 2026).

Constitutional officers elected on a countywide basis are Clerk Christine Giordano Hanlon (R, 2025; Ocean Township), Sheriff Shaun Golden (R, 2025; Howell Township) and Surrogate Rosemarie D. Peters (R, 2026; Middletown Township).

=== Politics ===
United States presidential election results for West Long Branch
Year	Republican		Democratic		Third party(ies)	
Year	No.	%	No.	%	No.	%
2024	2,410	64.16%	1,283	34.16%	63	1.68%
2020	2,444	59.57%	1,602	39.04%	57	1.39%
2016	2,231	59.91%	1,372	36.84%	121	3.25%
2012	2,029	57.63%	1,461	41.49%	31	0.88%
2008	2,208	58.43%	1,524	40.33%	47	1.24%
2004	2,202	57.73%	1,574	41.27%	38	1.00%
2000	1,727	46.05%	1,902	50.72%	121	3.23%
1996	1,476	44.46%	1,600	48.19%	244	7.35%
1992	1,824	49.36%	1,323	35.81%	548	14.83%

As of March 2011, there were a total of 4,862 registered voters in West Long Branch, of which 1,189 (24.5%) were registered as Democrats, 1,049 (21.6%) were registered as Republicans and 2,622 (53.9%) were registered as Unaffiliated. There were 2 voters registered as either Libertarians or Greens.

In the 2012 presidential election, Republican Mitt Romney received 57.6% of the vote (2,029 cast), ahead of Democrat Barack Obama with 41.5% (1,461 votes), and other candidates with 0.9% (31 votes), among the 3,548 ballots cast by the borough's 5,079 registered voters (27 ballots were spoiled), for a turnout of 69.9%. In the 2008 presidential election, Republican John McCain received 57.4% of the vote (2,208 cast), ahead of Democrat Barack Obama with 39.6% (1,524 votes) and other candidates with 1.2% (47 votes), among the 3,844 ballots cast by the borough's 5,065 registered voters, for a turnout of 75.9%. In the 2004 presidential election, Republican George W. Bush received 57.4% of the vote (2,202 ballots cast), outpolling Democrat John Kerry with 41.1% (1,574 votes) and other candidates with 0.8% (38 votes), among the 3,833 ballots cast by the borough's 4,926 registered voters, for a turnout percentage of 77.8.

Gubernatorial election results for West Long Branch
Year	Republican		Democratic		Third party(ies)	
Year	No.	%	No.	%	No.	%
2025	1,893	63.33%	1,087	36.37%	9	0.30%
2021	1,694	65.46%	881	34.04%	13	0.50%
2017	1,348	59.86%	847	37.61%	57	2.53%
2013	1,612	72.71%	573	25.85%	32	1.44%
2009	1,732	63.68%	794	29.19%	194	7.13%
2005	1,555	53.88%	1,210	41.93%	121	4.19%

In the 2013 gubernatorial election, Republican Chris Christie received 72.7% of the vote (1,612 cast), ahead of Democrat Barbara Buono with 25.8% (573 votes), and other candidates with 1.4% (32 votes), among the 2,246 ballots cast by the borough's 5,068 registered voters (29 ballots were spoiled), for a turnout of 44.3%. In the 2009 gubernatorial election, Republican Chris Christie received 63.1% of the vote (1,732 ballots cast), ahead of Democrat Jon Corzine with 28.9% (794 votes), Independent Chris Daggett with 6.4% (176 votes) and other candidates with 0.7% (18 votes), among the 2,743 ballots cast by the borough's 4,872 registered voters, yielding a 56.3% turnout.

United States Senate election results for West Long Branch1
Year	Republican		Democratic		Third party(ies)	
Year	No.	%	No.	%	No.	%
2024	2,221	63.01%	1,244	35.29%	60	1.70%
2018	1,739	60.51%	1,052	36.60%	83	2.89%
2012	1,894	57.34%	1,347	40.78%	62	1.88%
2006	1,479	55.87%	1,108	41.86%	60	2.27%

United States Senate election results for West Long Branch2
Year	Republican		Democratic		Third party(ies)	
Year	No.	%	No.	%	No.	%
2020	2,370	59.35%	1,541	38.59%	82	2.05%
2014	1,277	55.59%	972	42.32%	48	2.09%
2013	743	56.72%	549	41.91%	18	1.37%
2008	1,921	55.31%	1,482	42.67%	70	2.02%

== Education ==
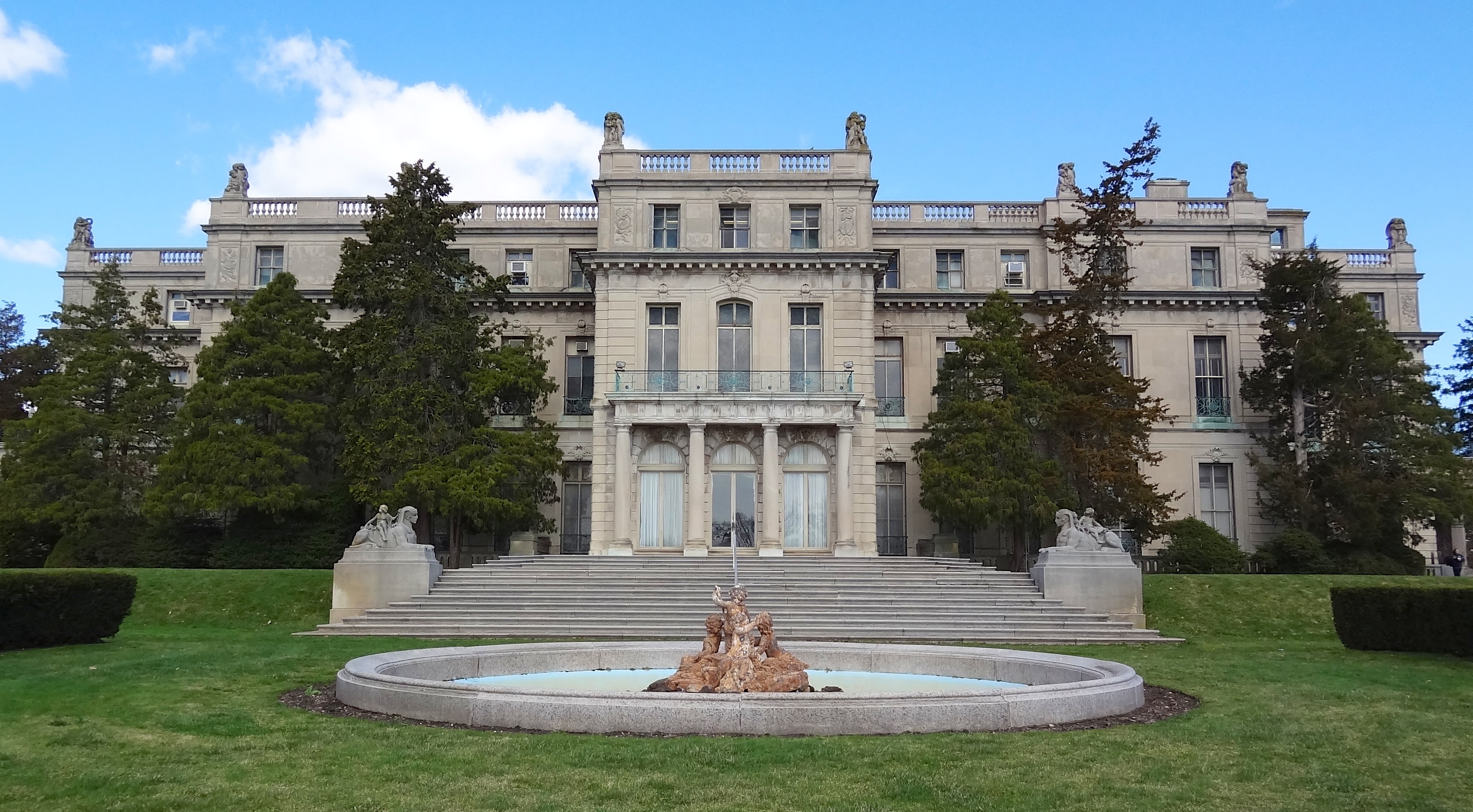
The Great Hall at Monmouth University

The West Long Branch Public Schools serves students in pre-kindergarten through eighth grade from West Long Branch. Students from Allenhurst, Interlaken and Loch Arbour attend the district's school as part of sending/receiving relationships, in which students attend on a tuition basis. As of the 2021–22 school year, the district, comprised of two schools, had an enrollment of 551 students and 61.5 classroom teachers (on an FTE basis), for a student–teacher ratio of 9.0:1. Schools in the district (with 2021–22 enrollment data from the National Center for Education Statistics) are Betty McElmon Elementary School with 330 students in pre-Kindergarten through fourth grade and Frank Antonides School with 214 students in fifth through eighth grades.

For ninth through twelfth grades, public school students attend Shore Regional High School, a regional high school located in West Long Branch that also serves students from the constituent districts of Monmouth Beach, Oceanport and Sea Bright. As of the 2021–22 school year, the high school had an enrollment of 613 students and 55.7 classroom teachers (on an FTE basis), for a student–teacher ratio of 11.0:1. Seats on the board of education for the high school district are allocated based on the population of the constituent municipalities, with four of the nine seats assigned to West Long Branch.

Established in 1933, Monmouth University is a four-year private university on a 155-acre (0.63 km^{2}) campus, with 5,600 students and 232 full-time faculty. The campus is notable for the Great Hall at Shadow Lawn, a National Historic Landmark that was used in the 1982 film Annie.

== Transportation ==
=== Roads and highways ===
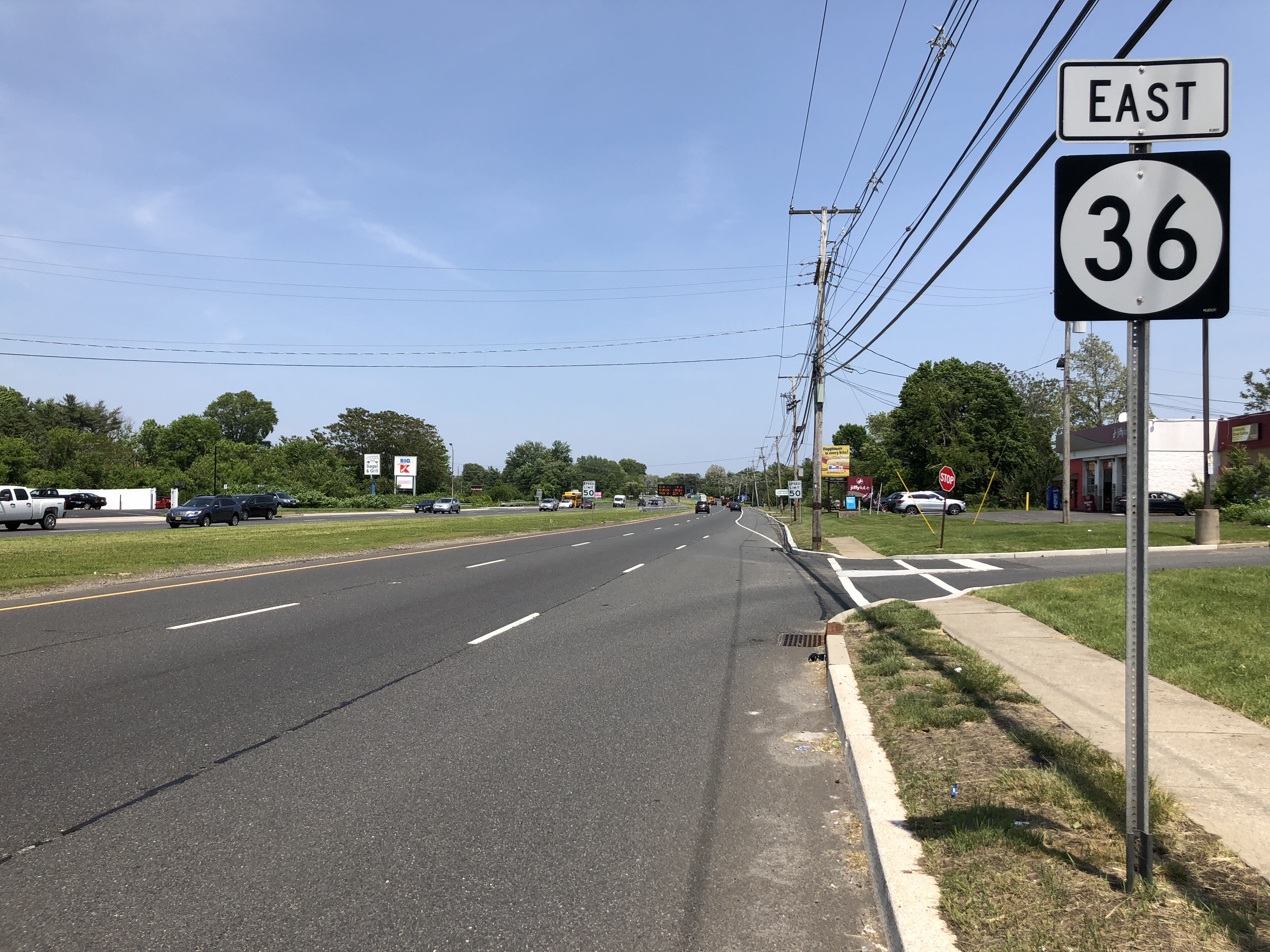
Route 36 in West Long Branch

As of May 2010, the borough had a total of 36.65 miles (58.98 km) of roadways, of which 27.84 miles (44.80 km) were maintained by the municipality, 5.19 miles (8.35 km) by Monmouth County and 3.62 miles (5.83 km) by the New Jersey Department of Transportation.

Route 36 and Route 71 intersect in the borough.

=== Public transportation ===
NJ Transit provides local bus service on the 831 and 837 routes.

The nearest train service is available at the Long Branch station. Commuter service is provided on the North Jersey Coast Line, offering express and local service. Diesel service operates from Hoboken Terminal to Bay Head station. Electric service operates from New York Penn Station to Long Branch station, where the electrified portion of the line ends. Mid-line stations include Newark Penn Station, Newark Liberty International Airport Station and Secaucus Junction.

== Notable people ==
People who were born in, residents of, or otherwise closely associated with West Long Branch include:

- Jake Areman (born 1996), soccer player who played for the Tampa Bay Rowdies in the USL Championship
- Holly Black (born 1971), author of the Spiderwick series of books
- Chester Bowman (1901–1936), sprinter who competed in the 1924 Summer Olympics
- Bessie Clayton (c. 1875–1948), toe-tap dancer
- Stephen Donaldson (1946–1996), LGBT rights and prison reform activist
- Clarkson Sherman Fisher (1921–1997), federal judge who served as a councilmember in West Long Branch and later as Chief Judge of the United States District Court for the District of New Jersey
- Jon Herington (born 1954), jazz guitarist
- Steve Holeman (born 1967), head coach of the Lamar Lady Cardinals soccer team
- Ryan McCormick (born 1991), professional golfer who plays on the PGA Tour
- Bill Palmer (1938–2020), swim coach
- Hubert T. Parson (1872–1940), businessman who served as president of the F. W. Woolworth Company
- Elise Primavera (born 1955), author and illustrator of children's books, including The Secret Order of the Gumm Street Girls
- Arthur Pryor (1870–1942), trombone virtuoso, bandleader, and soloist with the Sousa Band who was a prolific composer of band music, best known for "The Whistler and His Dog"
- T. M. Stevens (born 1951), bassist
- Jack Yonezuka (born 2003), judoka who competed in the 2024 Summer Olympics
- Jimmy Zoppi (born 1954), musician and voice actor
