= Elise Primavera =

American writer

- Born: 19 May 1955 (age 71); West Long Branch, New Jersey, United States
- Occupation: Illustrator/Author
- Writing career
- Notable work: The Secret Order of the Gumm Street Girls

Elise Primavera (born 19 May 1955) is an American author and illustrator of children's novels. She arrived on the literary scene in 1981 as an illustrator for Atheneum, Putnam, and other publishing houses. Over the course of the last three decades, she has been a prolific illustrator and has written and illustrated several well-received books of her own.

== Biography ==
Primavera was born in West Long Branch, New Jersey. As a young girl, her brother, whom she admired greatly as an artist, taught her to draw a tree and a simple cartoon. She began copying cartoons she found in comic books, drawing on anything she could find, including her school books, her desks, and even getting in trouble for drawing on her clothing. Her interest in art grew more serious during the summer after she turned 11, when she contracted rheumatic fever and was confined to bed for the entire summer. During the enforced physical inactivity, she used the time to refine her drawing ability by working through several "learn-to-draw" books. Her childhood goal was to become an Olympic rider, and after she recovered from her illness and was no longer bedridden, she rekindled her love for horseback riding.

During her childhood, she became an admirer of the works of great artists, particularly that of Michelangelo, as her parents had large replicas of his paintings that she particularly enjoyed. She specifically credits the period when she was ill for motivating her to develop her artistic skills in a serious way. She also enjoyed the work of Howard Pyle, an artist she discovered on a trip to the college art museum. After a visit to an art museum during college, she set aside her dream of becoming an Olympian to focus full-time on becoming an artist. Primavera lived for a time in Red Bank, New Jersey, but she currently resides in New York City. She is not married.

== Career ==
While Primavera displayed an interest in art from a very young age, she has said in Talking With Artists, "I can't say I ever really dreamed I'd grow up to be an artist." Instead, she had focused from a young age on becoming an Olympic horseback rider. During college, she turned her artistic talents to fashion illustration, but she realized quickly that beginning a career in this field was very difficult. After college, she gave up this pursuit, and decided to become an artist. Her first published work appeared in 1981, with the release of The Mermaid's Cape and The Snug Little House, which she illustrated. Her first work as an author, Basil and Maggie, was published in 1983.

Primavera has stated that she gets her best ideas while taking showers. She wrote the book Auntie Claus in 1999, after one such "shower session." According to The New York Times, her illustrations in that book "brim with fantastic energy" and, in fact, were of such quality that dioramas based upon the illustrations appeared in the window of the flagship Saks Fifth Avenue stores in Manhattan. In 2005, Primavera was chosen to create the art for the White House's Holiday Program. Her first novel-length work, The Secret Order of the Gumm Street Girls, was released in 2006, and in recent years, she has been very prolific, releasing two books in the Fred and Anthony series in 2007, with two more set to be released in 2008. She is also working on another book about the Gumm Street Girls.

== Bibliography ==
Bibliography courtesy of isbndb.com.

=== As author/illustrator ===
Basil and Maggie, c. 1983, Lippincott
Ralph's Frozen Tale, c. 1991, Putnam
The Three Dots, c. 1993, Putnam
Plantpet, c. 1994, Putnam and Gosset Group.
Auntie Claus, c. 1999, Silver Whistle/Harcourt Brace.
Tatie Noël, c. 2001, Milan.
Auntie Claus and the Key to Christmas, c. 2002, Silver Whistle/Harcourt.
The Secret Order of the Gumm Street Girls, c. 2006, Harper Collins
Fred and Anthony Escape from the Netherworld, (As Esile Arevamirp), c. 2007, Hyperion.
Fred and Anthony Meet the Super-de-Germ-O Zombie, (As Esile Arevamirp), c. 2007, Hyperion.
Fred & Anthony Meet the Heinie Goblins from the Black Lagoon, (As Esile Arevamirp), c. 2008, Hyperion.
Fred & Anthony's Horrible, Hideous Back-to-School Thriller, (As Esile Arevamirp)

=== As illustrator only ===
The Mermaid's Cape, by Margaret K. Wetterer, c. 1981, Atheneum.
The Snug Little House, by Eils Moorehouse Lewis, c. 1981, Atheneum.
The Giant's Apprentice, by Margaret K. Wetterer, c. 1982, Atheneum.
Surprise in the Mountains, by Natalie Savage Carlson, c. 1983, Harper & Row.
Uncle George Washington and Harriet's Guitar, by Miriam Anne Bourne, c. 1983, Coward McCann.
The Bollo Caper, by Art Buchwald, c. 1983, Putnam.
Grandma's House, by Elaine Moore, c. 1985, Lothrop Lee & Shepard Books.
Make Way for Sam Houston, by Jean Fritz, c. 1986, Putnam.
Hobie Hanson, You're Weird, by Jamie Gilson, c. 1987, Pocket Books.
Christina Katerina and the Time She Quit Her Family, by Patricia Lee Gaugh, c. 1987, Putnam.
Best Witches: Poems for Halloween, by Jane Yolen, c. 1988, Putnam.
Double Dog Dare, by Jamie Gilson, c. 1988, Pocket Books.
Grandma's Promise, by Elaine Moore, c. 1988, Lothrop Lee & Shepard Books.
Christina Katerina and the Great Bear Train, by Patricia Lee Gaugh, c. 1990, Putnam.
Moe the Dog in Tropical Paradise, by Diane Stanley, c. 1992, Putnam.
Santa and Alex, by Delis Ephron, c. 1993, Little Brown & Company.
Woe is Moe, by Diane Stanley, c. 1995, Putnam.
Jack, Skinny Bones, and the Golden Pancakes, by M.C. Helldorfer, c. 1996, Viking.
Wowo, the Radio Dog, by Kevin McCloskey, c. 1996, William Morrow & Company.
Moonlight Kite, by Helen Elizabeth Buckley, c. 1997, Lothrop Lee & Shepard Books.
Raising Dragons, by Jerdine Nolen, c. 1998, Silver Whistle.
Hewitt Anderson's Big Life, by Jerdine Nolen, c. 2001, Harcourt Children's Books.
