= Sears, Roebuck and Company Complex =

Buildings in Chicago, Illinois

- U.S. National Register of Historic Places
- U.S. National Historic Landmark
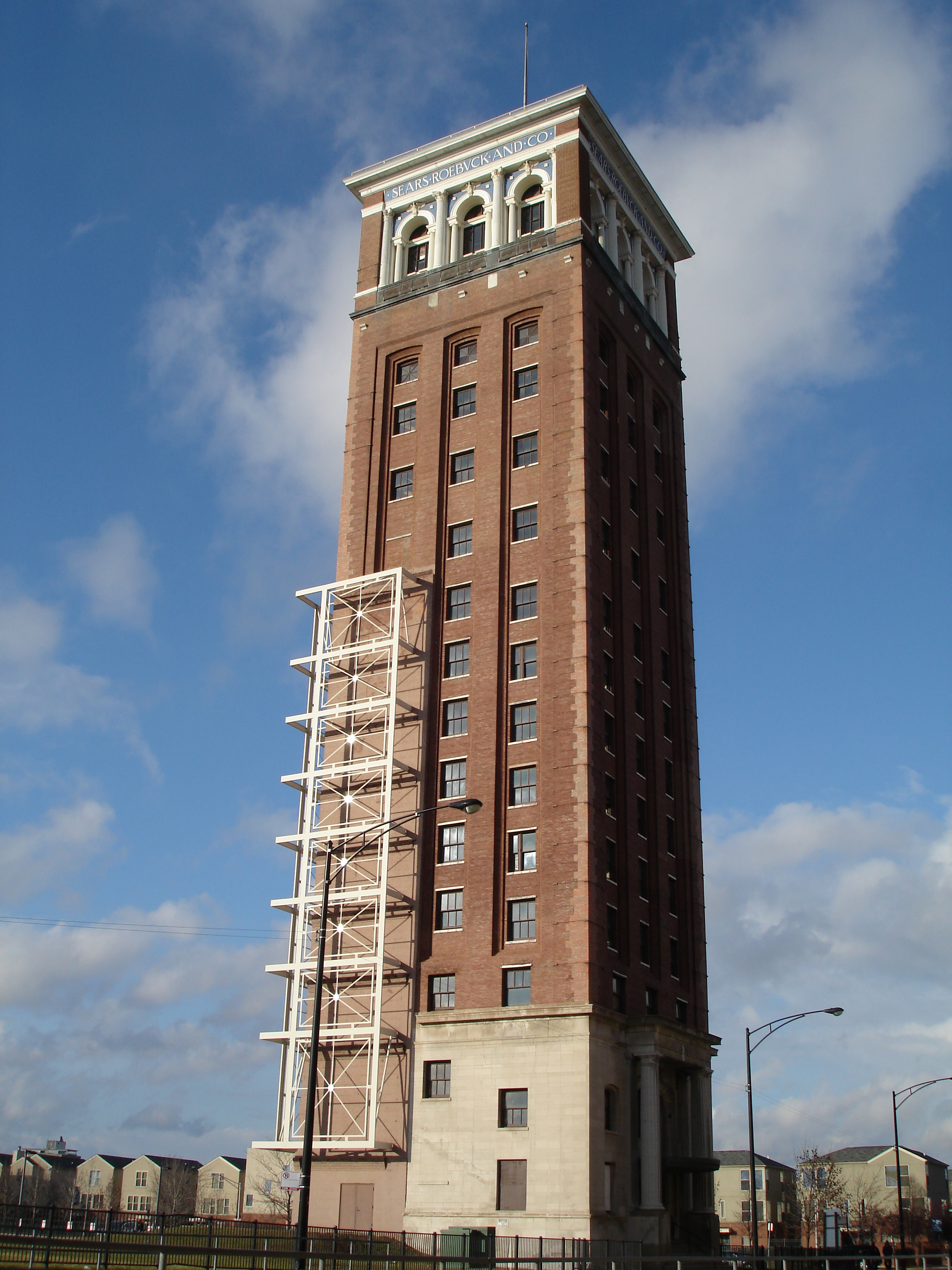
- The former Sears Merchandise Building Tower, the sole surviving portion of the complex's Merchandise Building, as shown in 2006.

- Location within Chicago metropolitan area Location within Illinois Location within the United States
- Location: 925 S. Homan Avenue, North Lawndale, Chicago, Illinois
- Coordinates: 41°52′10″N 87°42′42″W
- Area: 16 acres (6.5 ha)
- Built: 1905; 121 years ago
- Built by: Thompson-Starrett Co.
- Architect: Nimmons & Fellows
- NRHP reference No.: 78001129

Significant dates
- Added to NRHP: June 2, 1978
- Designated NHL: June 2, 1978

The Sears, Roebuck and Company Complex is a building complex in the community area of North Lawndale in Chicago, Illinois. The complex hosted most of department-store chain Sears' mail order operations between 1906 and 1993, and it also served as Sears' corporate headquarters until 1973, when the Sears Tower was completed. Of its original 40-acre (16 ha) complex, only three buildings survive and have been adaptively rehabilitated to other uses. The complex was designated a National Historic Landmark in 1978, at which time it still included the 3,000,000-square-foot (280,000 m^{2}; 69-acre; 28 ha) mail order plant, the world's largest commercial building when it was completed. That building has been demolished, its site taken up by the Homan Square redevelopment project.

These core buildings occupy an area bounded on the north by West Arthington Street, the west by Central Park Avenue, the east by Spaulding Avenue, and the south by West Fillmore Street.

== History ==
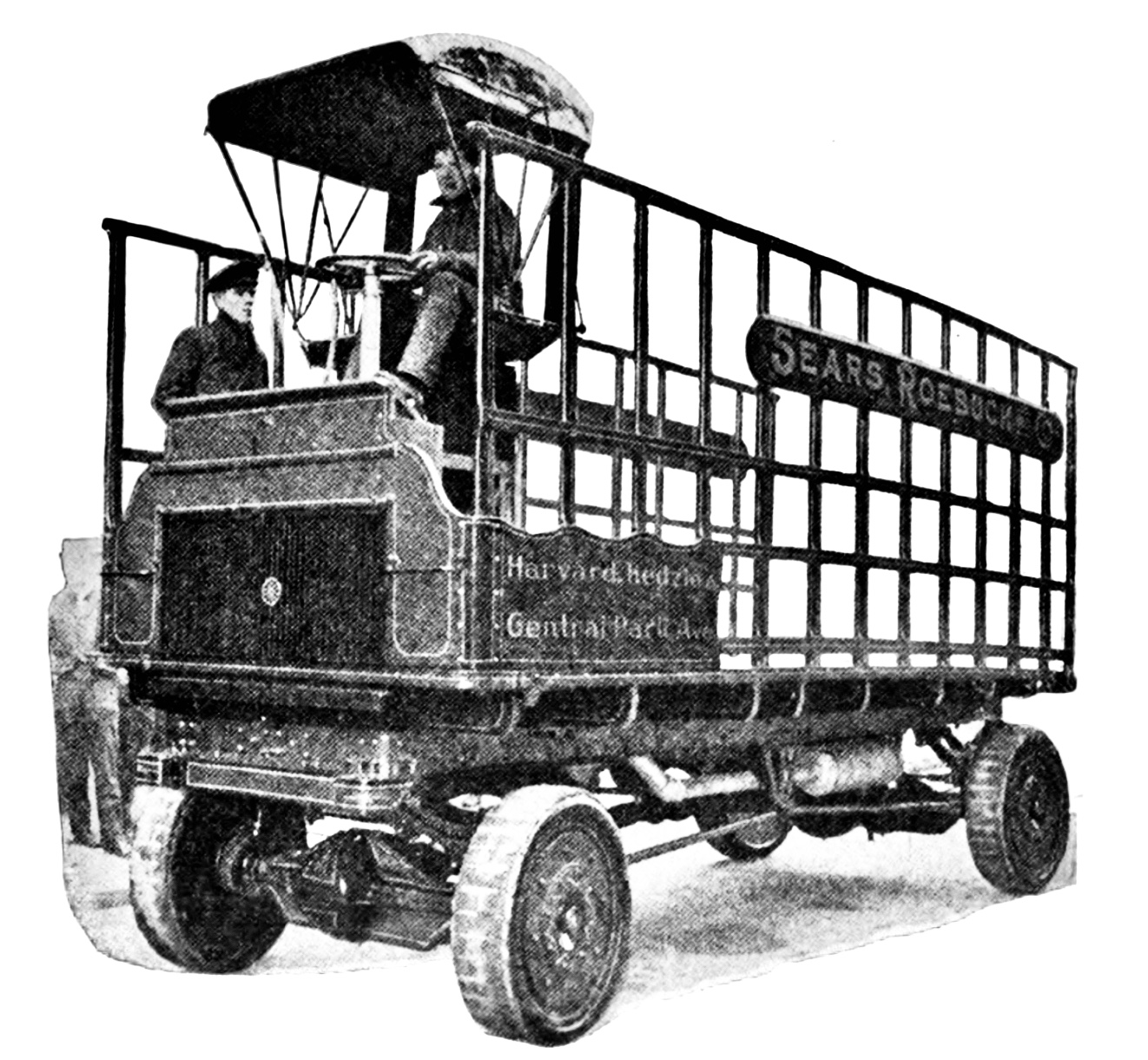
Truck owned by Sears Roebuck. Two of them were in use around 1908.

Sears was founded in 1886, renamed Sears Roebuck in 1893 when Alvah Roebuck joined the firm, and was originally headquartered in Minneapolis, Minnesota. Experiencing rapid growth, the retailer in 1895 moved its headquarters to a building on West Adams Street in Chicago, and again the following year to Fulton and Desplaines Streets. The company's rapid growth created problems with the fulfillment of orders, because it had to lease space all over the city to warehouse its products.

In 1904 the company purchased more than 40 acres (16 ha) of land on Chicago's West Side, and embarked on one of the largest retail development projects to date. The centerpiece of the company-owned "city within a city" were its central administration building, a merchandise development house, and a mail order processing facility, along with a power plant to provide electricity and heat to the entire complex. Designed by Nimmons and Fellows, a local architectural firm, the complex was so large the company required city permission to build over some city streets.

In the 1920s extensive athletic facilities were added to the complex, as an encouragement for after-work socialization to keep employee morale high. Included were a clubhouse and tennis courts, and the Sears Department of the YMCA. Events included an annual track and field competitions, and company baseball teams.

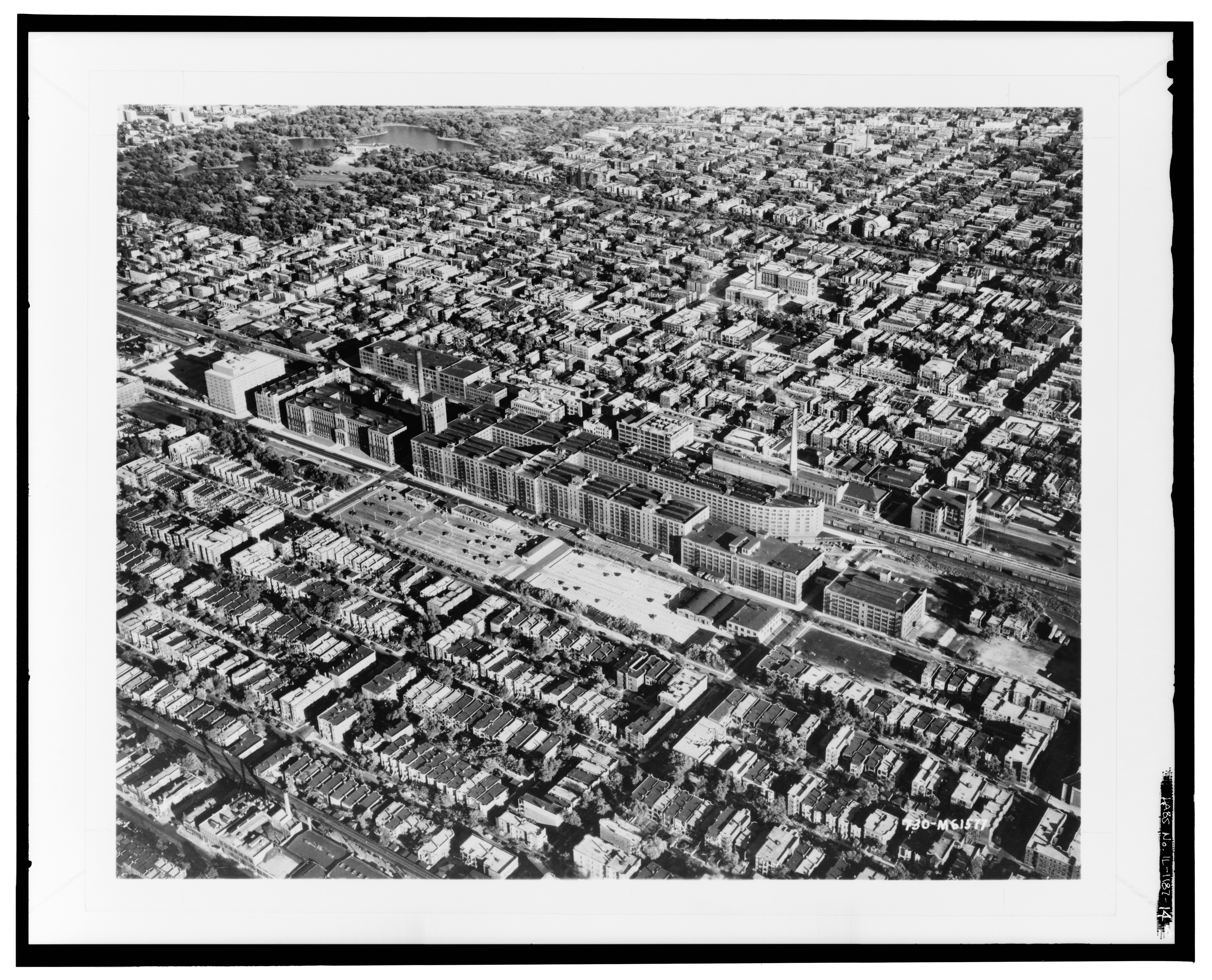
The full extent of the Sears, Roebuck and Company Complex (towering cluster of buildings in center), circa 1950.

By 1926, the first ground level parking lots replaced the athletic fields. This happened at the same time that a strategic shift from catalog sales to retail stores had started with easy auto travel making travel to a store more practical. By 1943 the complex had become a city within itself. Sears created their own services for effective use, much advanced beyond what was required at the time, including:

- a company police department, with armed officers, and early use of private police.
- a company fire department, with volunteer firemen, and early use of fire sprinklers.
- a 200,000-gallon water tank, water use and fire prevention purposes.
- a newspaper publicity office.
- a cafeteria – originally men and women were separated, and multiple levels of service for all employee lunch and breakfast.
- a private bank offering services for employees on site.

The company's growth continued through the 20th century, and by the 1960s it was the largest retailer in the world. Changing trends in retail sales and methods led to a decline, and the company's mail order business was scaled back in 1987, moving out of these premises. The corporate headquarters had been moved in 1973 to the Sears Tower, so the complex then stood vacant. Its closure of the complex presented the city with a redevelopment problem.

In 1992 a non-profit partnership organized by former Sears management began to redevelop the site, now dubbed Homan Square. The mail order merchandise building was demolished (except for its main tower), and the land it occupies has been redeveloped to include new residences, retail, and a community center. Homan Square is used as an example of the gradual turn around of North Lawndale. Included in this reconstruction effort is the massive rehabilitation of the former Sears Power House, into the Charles H. Shaw Technology and Learning Center—a LEED Platinum historic renovation designed by Farr Associates.

== Surviving buildings ==
The elements that survive from the early period of the Sears complex development are organized around South Homan Avenue, between West Arthington Street and the railroad tracks to the south. The merchandise tower, the only surviving element of the 3-million-square-foot Merchandise Building, is to the west, and the Power House and Administration Building are to the east. Beyond those two, fronting on West Arthington and Spaulding Avenue, is the former Merchandise Laboratory. These buildings were built along the former right-of-way of the Baltimore and Ohio Chicago Terminal Railroad (now CSX).

=== Sears Merchandise Building Tower ===
Sears Merchandise Building Tower
- Interactive map of the Sears Merchandise Building Tower area

General information
- Location: 925 South Homan Avenue, Lawndale, Chicago, Illinois 60624
- Construction started: 1905
- Completed: 1906

Height
- Roof: 76 m (249 ft)

Technical details
- Floor count: 14

Design and construction
- Architect: George G. Nimmons – William K. Fellows

The Sears Merchandise Building Tower is a fourteen-story structure, with a limestone base and brick walls. It is crowned by a Classical Revival top floor with round-arch windows and a modillioned cornice. It housed water tanks for firefighting on the upper levels, as well as offices and secretarial training facilities. It also housed the early broadcast facilities for WLS-AM. In 2015, it was refurbished and reopened to the public as the "John D. and Alexandra C. Nichols Tower". It now houses non-profit groups and offices, including a classroom on the 12th floor for the School of the Art Institute of Chicago. The Sears Roebuck plaque is still visible on top of the building.

=== Administration Building ===
The Sears, Roebuck and Company Administration Building is a broad five-story masonry building, occupying about 3/4 of the block facing West Arthington between South Homan and Spaulding. It has ornate Classical Revival detailing applied to an otherwise fairly typical Chicago School design.

=== Power Station ===
The Power Station is a rectangular, nominally single-story, brick structure measuring 114 by 231 feet (35 m × 70 m). Its front facade is characterized by tall and large round-arch windows, with a stepped parapet above.

=== Merchandise Development Laboratory ===
This building, which is an L-shaped structure six stories in height and finished in brick, housed the company's catalog printing operation from 1905 to 1926. It served for about forty years as its principal product testing laboratory.

== Homan Square Facility ==
A former warehouse of the complex was repurposed by Chicago Police into the Homan Square facility. It gained national notoriety due to its characterization in the media as a CPD 'Black site'.

== Filming location ==
- Ocean's Twelve (2004) – George Clooney as Danny Ocean and Matt Damon as Linus Caldwell along with many other actors filmed a scene in the Power House.
- Stranger than Fiction (2006) – For this movie, Emma Thompson as Karen Eiffel filmed a night scene in front of the tower.
