= John A. McCall =

1849–1906, insurance executive

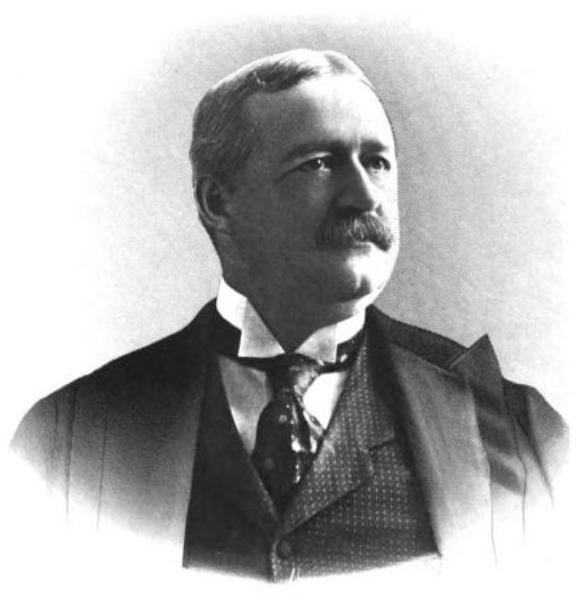
- Born: John Augustine McCall; March 2, 1849; Albany, New York
- Died: February 28, 1906 (aged 56); Lakewood, New Jersey
- Burial place: Woodlawn Cemetery
- Occupation: Insurance executive

Signature
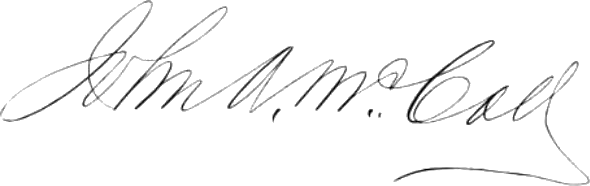

John Augustine McCall (March 2, 1849 – February 18, 1906) was an American insurance executive from New York.

== Life ==
McCall was born on March 2, 1849, in Albany, New York, the son of merchant John A. McCall and Katherine MacCormack. He was of Scotch-Irish descent on both sides of his family. His father was an Irish immigrant and a member of the McCaul family.

McCall attended the Albany Commercial College. In 1865, he became a clerk in the Albany Sorting House for State Currency. He spent two years as bookkeeper in the Albany office of the Connecticut Mutual Life Insurance Company. He then spent some time working with the real estate and insurance firm Levi Parker & Company. In 1870, he became a clerk in the New York State Insurance Department under Superintendent George W. Miller. In 1872, he was put in charge of the statistical reports of the department's reports. A few months later, he was appointed examiner of companies by Superintendent Orlow W. Chapman. In 1876, he was promoted to Deputy Superintendent, a position he held for several years under several Superintendents. As Deputy he helped expose fraudulent practices in the insurance business, resulting in many fire insurance companies, eighteen New York life insurance companies, and fifteen out-of-state life insurance companies to go out of business as well as three prominent officials in insurance companies to be convicted of fraud and sentenced to a severe prison sentence.

In 1883, Governor Grover Cleveland appointed McCall State Superintendent of Insurance. Governor Hill offered to reappoint him to the office in 1886, but he declined the offer and became comptroller of the Equitable Life Assurance Society in New York City, a position he held for six years. In 1892, after the former president of the New York Life Insurance Company resigned due to grave charges against him and his management of the company, the company's board of trustees unanimously appointed McCall president of the company. He was also a trustee of the New York Surety Company and the New York Security and Trust Company, and was a director of the Central National Bank, the National City Bank, the National Surety Company, and the Metropolitan Life Insurance Company.

In 1905, the Armstrong Investigation turned the spotlight onto the New York Life Insurance Company, with McCall taking center stage as its president. He testified the company paid hundreds of thousands of dollars to a legislative agent to stop hostile legislation, made big contributions to national political campaigns, and at one point retained a legislative agent to fight federal legislation in Washington. He then resigned as president in response. He began to suffer poor health as a result of the investigations and died not long afterwards.

McCall was a member of the Metropolitan Club, the Catholic Club of New York, the Manhattan Club, the New York Athletic Club, the City Club of New York, the Chamber of Commerce, the Metropolitan Museum of Art, and the National Arts Club. In 1870, he married Mary I. Horan. Their children were Mary K., Josephine I., John Chapman, Ballard, Leo H., Sidney C., and Clifford H.

McCall died from cirrhosis of the liver in the Laurel House in Lakewood, New Jersey, on February 18, 1906. He was buried in Woodlawn Cemetery.
