= The Secret Order of the Gumm Street Girls =

2006 children's novel by Elise Primavera

- Author: Elise Primavera
- Illustrator: Elise Primavera
- Language: English
- Genre: Children's literature
- Publisher: HarperCollins
- Publication date: September 26, 2006
- Publication place: United States
- Media type: Hardcover
- Pages: 464
- ISBN: 0-06-056946-8

The Secret Order of the Gumm Street Girls is a children's novel written by Elise Primavera. The book was published by HarperCollins on October 1, 2006. Publishers Weekly described it as "a postmodern, surreal reworking" of The Wizard of Oz.

== Plot ==
Former beauty queen Pearl Diamond and her daughter, Ivy, move into #5 Gumm Street in the town of Sherbet. While moving in, Ivy befriends her neighbor, Franny Muggs, and meets two other girls, Pru Gumm and Cat Lemonjello, who harbor ongoing animosity towards each other.

Their neighbor, Mr. Staccato, offers to give Ivy piano lessons. When Ivy goes to his house for her first lesson, she sees the glamorous ruby slippers from the film The Wizard of Oz, which Mr. Staccato claims to have worked on. He tells her that she is the true owner of the slippers, warning her never to give them up.

Sherbet experiences its first hurricane and Ivy speeds off home, promising to return the next day. Later, at #3 Gumm, Franny has a vision of Mr. Staccato, who has died in the storm.

The next day, the hurricane dissipates, and Ivy and Franny return to Mr. Staccato's house. Ivy takes one of the Ruby Red Slippers; the other is missing. ChaCha, a glamorous woman claiming to be Mr. Staccato's relative, appears and demands to be given the shoe. Ivy and Franny manage to escape to Ivy's house, where they all conclude that Ivy, whose mother's middle name is Gale, is a descendant of Dorothy, and that Mr. Staccato's dogs Fred and Ginger are related to Toto, while ChaCha is the Wicked Witch of the West.

ChaCha traps the girls and the dogs in a champagne-colored Cadillac filled with jellybeans, sending them off in a “backwards tidal wave.” They wake up to find themselves in an underground world called Spoz. There they meet Cha Cha's nieces, the vicious teens Bling Bling and Coco, who enslave the girls.

The girls escape and flee to the land of Spudz, where they have various surreal adventures, finally ending up at a gingerbread cottage, where they find the missing shoe and a portal to Mr. Staccato's museum room. ChaCha then appears and demands the shoes. Fred, Ginger, and the girls run to escape ChaCha. They smell something burning and realize the house is on fire. Barely making it out, the girls watch the ill-fated house fall on ChaCha.

Back in Sherbet, the reunited Diamond Family find Mr. Staccato's will and discover that he left his home and all his possessions to them. Now, at #7 Gumm, the Diamonds, Fred, and Ginger make their home.

== Main characters ==
- Franny Muggs lives at #3 Gumm Street and is known for her creative ideas. Throughout the novel, Franny shows her quick-thinking and bravery in her quest to help her newfound friend, Ivy Diamond.
- Ivy Diamond moves to #5 Gumm Street with her mother in search of a fresh start in life. Ivy is plagued with a seven-year Jinx due to breaking a mirror.
- Prudence Gumm: lives at #1 Gumm Street and spends her time making up Safety Tips. She's the only daughter of Patience and Judge Gumm. Pru is the classic “scaredy cat” character. This character and the titular street are both named after Frances Gumm, the given name of Wizard of Oz star Judy Garland.
- Cat Lemonjello: resides at #2 Gumm Street with parents Lenny and Lynette and her ten brothers. Cat spends her time doing cartwheels and other outdoor activities. She also enjoys consulting the I Ching in time of need. Cat is the 11th child of the 11th child, which is said to be the cause of her ESP.

== Reviews ==
Kirkus Reviews called the book "a mixed bag, but entertaining," but also "Great fun in parts, ambitious and good-natured." Both Kirkus and Publishers Weekly praised the author's black and white illustrations.
