= Holmby Hills, Los Angeles =

Neighborhood of Los Angeles, California, US

Holmby Hills
- Neighborhood of Los Angeles
- Location within Western Los Angeles Holmby Hills (the Los Angeles metropolitan area)
- Coordinates: 34.089559°N 118.424034°W
- Country: United States
- State: California
- County: Los Angeles
- City: Los Angeles
- Elevation: 482 ft (147 m)
- Time zone: UTC-8 (PST)
  - Summer (DST): UTC-7 (PDT)
- Zip codes: 90077
- Area codes: 310, 424

Holmby Hills is a neighborhood on the Westside of Los Angeles, California, United States.

The neighborhood was developed in the early 20th century by the Janss Investment Company, which developed the rest of Westwood, Los Angeles, as well as other "LA" neighborhoods. With the expansion of Sunset Boulevard, Holmby Hills was split into northern and southern sections, each lying within a different community plan area designated by the City of Los Angeles: The portion south of Sunset Boulevard extends south to Club View Dr and east to Beverly Glen Boulevard and west of the Los Angeles Country Club; it is located within the Westwood Community Plan Area, but certain characteristics such as the absence of sidewalks and the presence of historic street lamps that are unique to Holmby Hills help to distinguish it from the remainder of Westwood.

The portion north of Sunset is the area east of Beverly Glen Boulevard and west of the city limits of Beverly Hills, with Greendale Drive and Brooklawn Drive as its northernmost streets; it is located within the Bel Air–Beverly Crest Community Plan Area, though it is historically distinct from the neighborhoods of both Bel Air and Beverly Crest, as it was developed concurrently with Westwood.

== Geography ==
Holmby Hills, Bel Air, and Beverly Hills form the "Platinum Triangle" of Los Angeles. It is bordered by the city of Beverly Hills on the east, Wilshire Boulevard on the south, Westwood on the west, and Bel Air on the north.

In an effort to decrease traffic in the neighborhood, speed bumps have been installed on several key streets.

== History ==
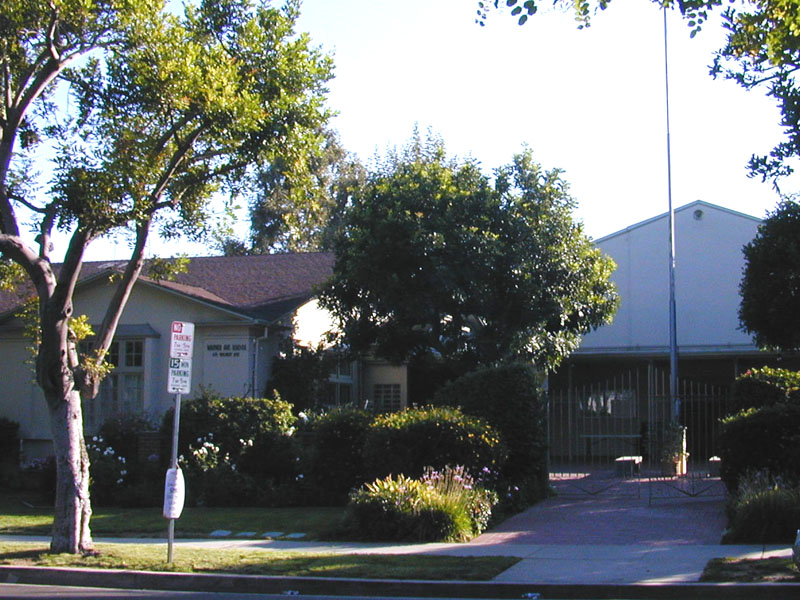
Warner Avenue School

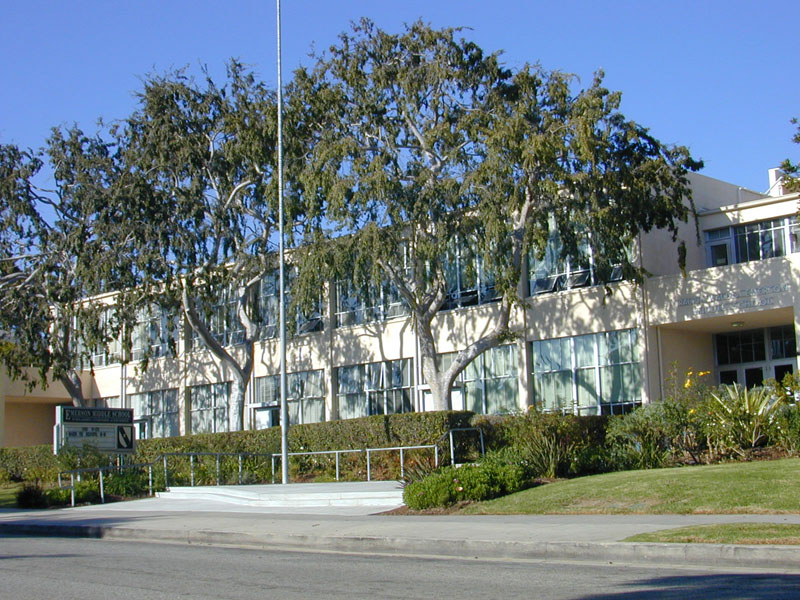
Emerson Middle School

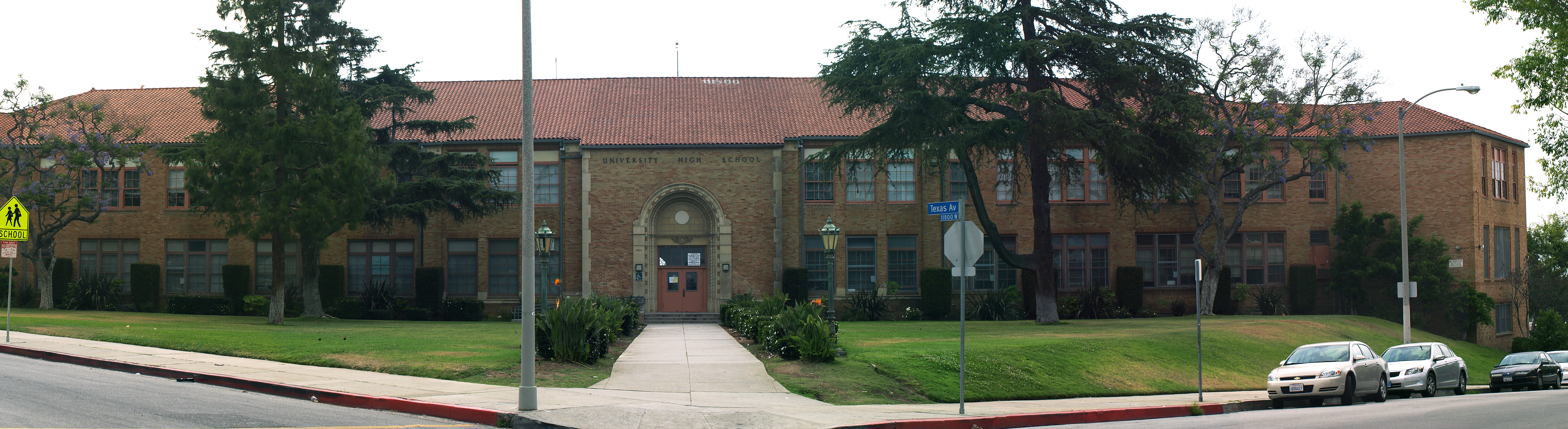
University High School

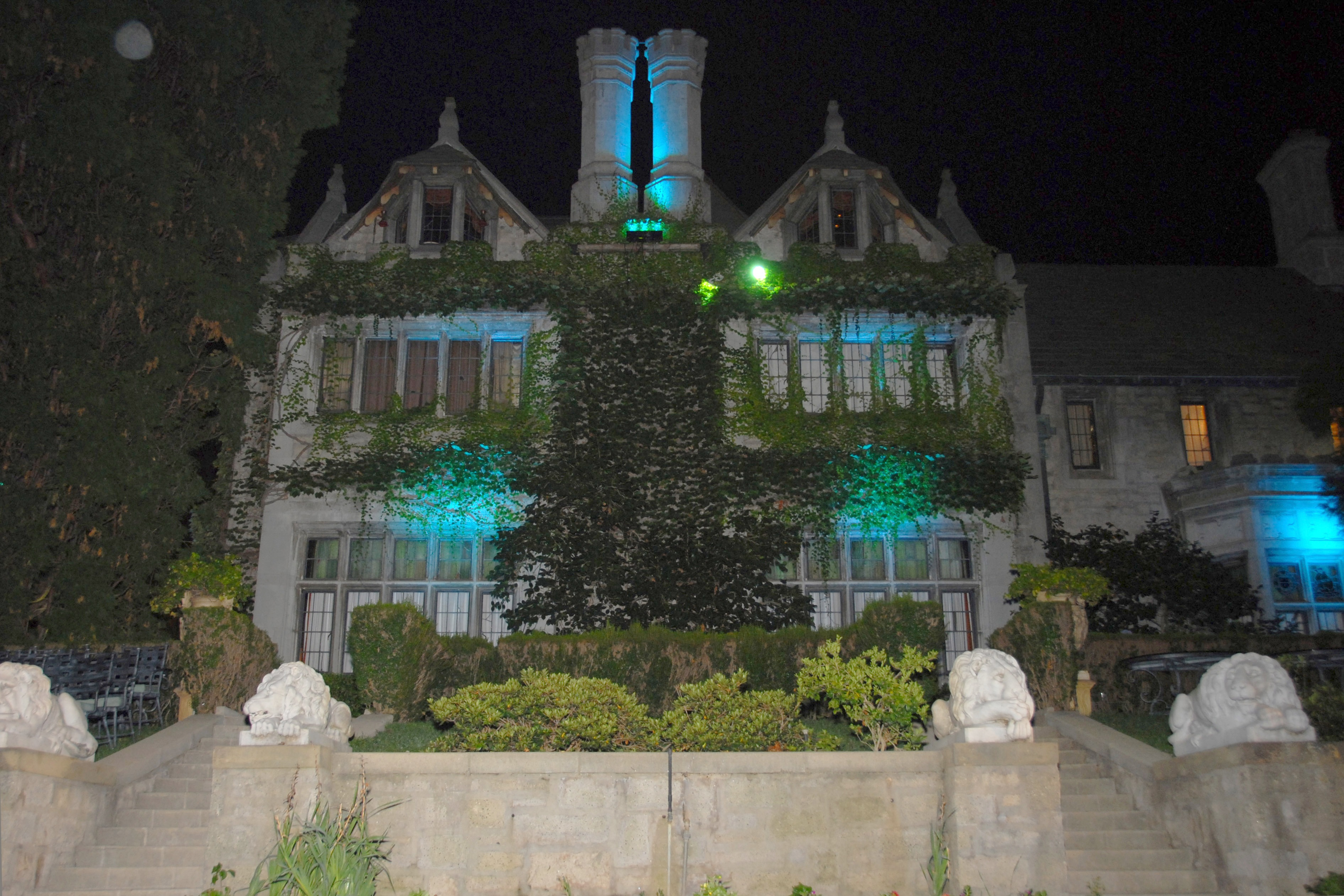
The Playboy Mansion

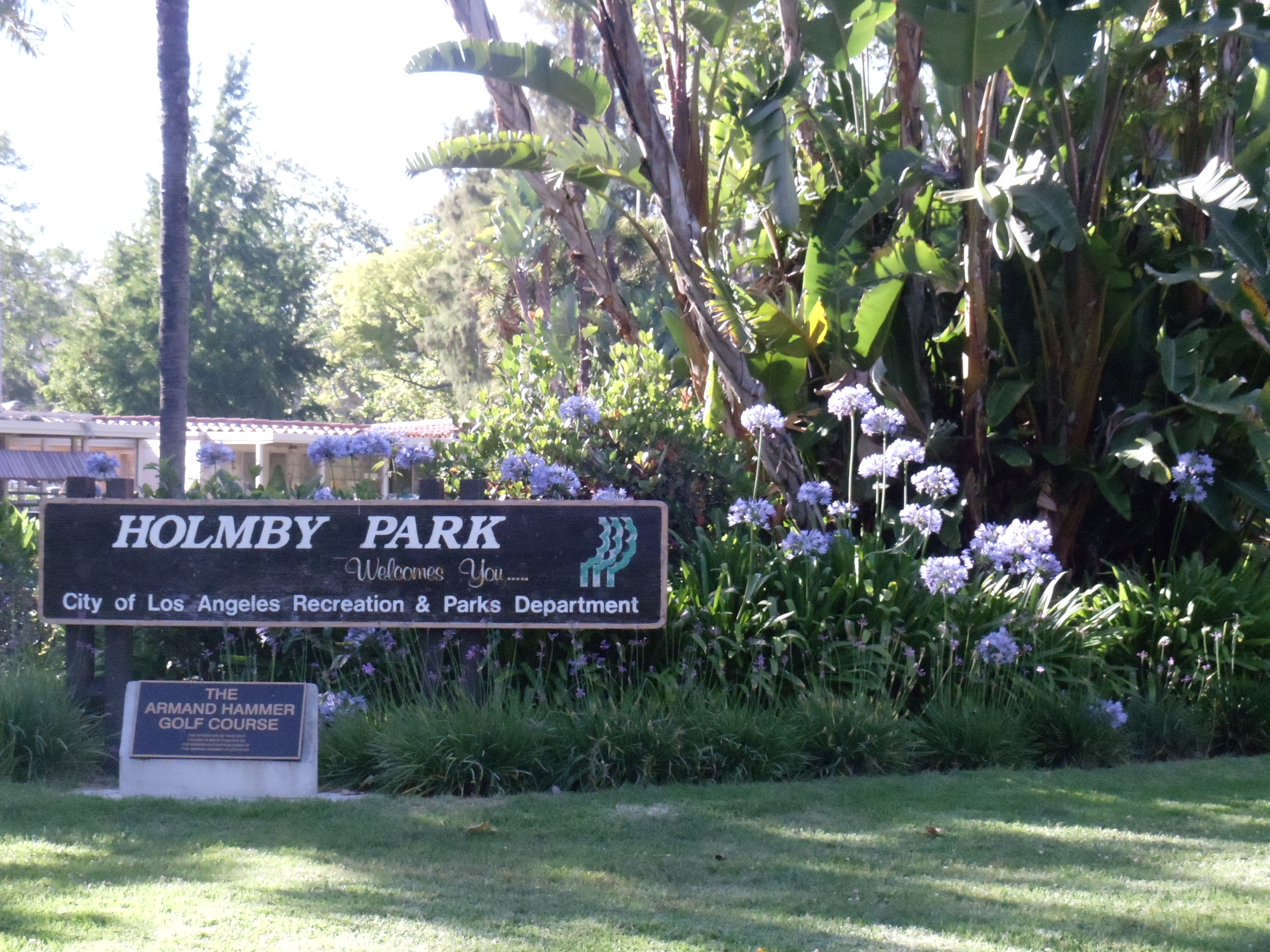
Sign of Holmby Park in Holmby Hills

The first European on the land that present-day Holmby Hills, Bel Air, Westwood, and UCLA now occupy was the Spanish soldier Maximo Alanis, who was the grantee of the 4,438-acre (18 km^{2}) Rancho San Jose de Buenos Ayres from a Mexican land grant issued by Alta California Governor Manuel Micheltorena in 1843.

In 1859, he sold it to Benjamin Davis Wilson, of early Pasadena development, the second Mayor of Los Angeles, and namesake for Mount Wilson in the San Gabriel Mountains. In 1884, Wilson sold Rancho San Jose de Buenos Ayres, at 2,000 acres (8 km^{2}), to the nephew of leading pioneer William Wolfskill, businessman John W. Wolfskill, son of Mathus (Mathius) Wolfskill, William's younger brother. He paid $10 an acre and built a ranch house, near the present-day Mormon Los Angeles Temple.

The development of Holmby Hills began when Arthur Letts Sr., purchased 400 acres (1.6 km^{2}) of the original Wolfskill ranch at $100 an acre. He called the development "Holmby Hills," which was loosely derived from the name of his birthplace, a small hamlet in England called Holdenby, and it was also the name of his estate in Hollywood. Letts died suddenly in 1923, before he could realize his vision. His son-in-law, Harold Janss, took over the project.

Zoning for the community, which straddles Sunset Boulevard, was designed to accommodate lot sizes up to 4 acres (16,000 m^{2}). The streets were named after places in Great Britain: Devon Avenue after Devon, the county in southwestern England; Charing Cross Road after Charing Cross junction in London; Conway Avenue after Conwy in Wales, etc. In the 1920s, English-style streetlamps were added specifically for the neighborhood. After the Wall Street Crash of 1929, grand mansions were constructed.

In 2012, residents tried to be annexed into the city of Beverly Hills, to make sure their potholes would be repaired, but this was rejected by John A. Mirisch, then Beverly Hills city councilor and later mayor.

According to the Holmby Hills Homeowners Association website: "In the 1920s, Sunset Boulevard was a two-lane country road, known as Beverly Boulevard. It was renamed when it was opened through to the Pacific Ocean. When Sunset Boulevard was expanded into a four-lane thoroughfare, Holmby Hills was, for all practical purposes, split into north and south sections." The northern section is served by the Holmby Hills Homeowners Association, while the southern section is served by the Holmby Westwood Property Owners Association, which it shares with the rest of the northern Westwood area east of UCLA. However, "[i]n 2013, the Holmby Hills Homeowners Association Board has decided to reach out to the homeowners south of Sunset (and east of Beverly Glen) to grow the Association with new members also residing in Holmby Hills having similar interests."

In 2000, Holmby Hills was ranked by Higley 1000 as the richest urban neighborhood in the United States. The 2017 report, however, redrew and expanded the neighborhood's boundaries, causing its ranking to slip.

== Community ==
The neighborhood is home to two parks: Holmby Park and De Neve Square Park. The former, Holmby Park, includes two playgrounds, a nine-hole putting green called the Armand Hammer Golf Course, and a classic lawn bowling, home to the Holmby Park Lawn Bowling Club started in 1927. It is located next to the Los Angeles Country Club.

The Frederick R. Weisman Art Foundation, an art gallery named after Frederick R. Weisman, is located on North Carolwood Street. It includes works by many noted artists, including impressionists, post-impressionist, surrealist, and many more, up through today.

== Education ==
=== Primary and secondary schools ===
==== Public schools ====
Residents are zoned to the following Los Angeles Unified School District schools: Warner Avenue Elementary School, Emerson Middle School, and University High School.

=== Colleges and universities ===
Holmby Hills is several blocks east of the University of California, Los Angeles (UCLA).

=== Private schools ===
The only school located within Holmby Hills is the Middle School (grades 7–9) component of the independent Harvard-Westlake School. The campus was originally occupied by Westlake School for Girls, which moved from its original site near downtown L.A. to the Holmby Hills campus in 1927. Harvard-Westlake was created in 1989 when Westlake merged with the Harvard School for Boys.

== Notable people ==
- Nicolas Berggruen purchased a 20,000 square-foot home in 2017.
- The son of Arthur Letts (1862–1923) lived in a mansion designed by architect Arthur Rolland Kelly located at 10236 Charing Cross Road. The residence became known as the Playboy Mansion when Hugh Hefner purchased it.
- Fanny Brice (1891–1951) resided in a house built in 1938 on North Faring Road, designed by architect John Elgin Woolf (1908–1980). Richard and Lauren King later purchased it for $15 million, and they set out to renovate it. Instead, they demolished it and rebuilt a Georgian-style mansion in its place in 2006. They listed the new property in 2013.
- Humphrey Bogart (1899–1957) and wife, Lauren Bacall (1924–2014) lived at 232 South Mapleton Drive in a house previously owned by Hedy Lamarr (1914–2000).
- Walt Disney (1901–1966) lived on North Carolwood Street. In 2001, his house was demolished because of the presence of asbestos and replaced by The Carolwood Estate, owned by investor Gabriel Brener. The Carolwood Estate has eight bedrooms, seventeen bathrooms, a wine cellar, a custom movie room, three bars, a library, a gym, two safe rooms, a pool with a pool house, a tennis court, and a putting green.
- Barbara Stanwyck (1907–1990) and Robert Taylor (1911–1969) lived at 423 North Faring Road.
- Bugsy Siegel (1906–1947) built a house in Holmby Hills, but he never lived in it. However, Max Factor Sr., founder of Max Factor, did. Later, producer Bud Yorkin and his wife Cynthia Sikes lived in the same house, but they sold it in 2010.
- Jack Benny (1894–1974) and his wife Mary Livingstone (1905–1983) lived at 10231 Charing Cross Road. It was then sold to two businessmen consecutively and listed again in 2011.
- Armand Hammer (1898–1990), founder of Occidental Petroleum, lived one block from Holmby Park.
- Irene Dunne (1898–1990) lived at 461 North Faring Road.
- Gary Cooper (1901–1961) lived in a 5,721 square-foot, four-bedroom, four-and-a-half-bathroom house designed by architect A. Quincy Jones in 1955. It was later owned by David Bohnett, co-founder of GeoCities, who listed it in 2010.
- Lloyd Bridges (1913–1998) and his wife, Dorothy Bridges (1915–2009), raised their children, actors Jeff Bridges and Beau Bridges, in the neighborhood.
- Bing Crosby (1903–1977) lived at 594 South Mapleton Drive.
- Joan Bennett (1910–1990) lived in a Provençal-style mansion in Holmby Hills designed by architect Wallace Neff for fifteen years.
- Jean Harlow (1911–1937) lived at 1535 Club View Drive.
- Alan Ladd (1913–1964) lived in a 9,200-square-foot, one-story, five-bedroom, seven-bathroom house designed by architect Wallace Neff. It was later owned by businessman Gerard Sullivan from 1990 to 2012.
- Sidney Sheldon (1917–2007) lived in a house designed by architect Paul Williams in Holmby Hills. It is now the private residence of Max Azria (born 1949).
- Aaron Spelling (1923–2006) and his wife Candy Spelling as well as their two children Tori Spelling and Randy Spelling lived in The Manor located at 594 South Mapleton Drive. It was sold to Petra Ecclestone for $85 million in 2011.
- Jayne Mansfield (1933–1967) lived at the Pink Palace located at 10100 Sunset Boulevard. It later became the home of Engelbert Humperdinck but was demolished in 2002.
- Ernest Carroll Moore (1871–1955) lived on Woodruff Avenue.
- Claudette Colbert (1935–1963) 615 North Faring Road.
- Barbra Streisand lived on North Carolwood Drive, as did Clark Gable (1901–1960), and Gregory Peck (1916–2003).
- Sean Combs (born 1969), founder of Bad Boy Entertainment, as well as rapper, singer, songwriter, record producer, record executive, actor and entrepreneur.
- Frank Sinatra (1915–1998) lived on North Carolwood Drive in the late 1940s. His house was later owned by Brad Grey, CEO of Paramount Pictures, who demolished it in August 2012 to sell it as an empty lot for a new construction.
- In 1989, Casey Kasem purchased a home built in 1954 and located at 138 North Mapleton Drive, previously owned by developer Abraham M. Lurie, as a birthday present for his wife, Jean Kasem. In 2013, he listed it for $43 million.
- In 2009, Michael Jackson (b. 1958) died in a rented mansion in Holmby Hills. The house, designed by architect Richard Landry, belonged to Hubert Guez, CEO of the clothing line Ed Hardy and his wife Roxane. Steven Mayer, a senior managing director at Cerberus Capital Management, purchased it for $18.1 million in 2012.
- W. Howard Lester, former CEO of Williams-Sonoma, Inc., lived in an 18,000-square-foot seven-bedroom, thirteen bathroom mansion with a wine cellar, a billiards room and a gym in Holmby Hills from 2004 to his death in 2010; the house was listed for sale in 2012.
- Jon Feltheimer lived in a 6,400-square-foot, five-bedroom, five-and-a-half-bathroom house built in 1927 in Holmby Hills from 2009 to 2011.
- Neil Diamond lived at 161 South Mapleton Drive.
- Donald Bren lives in Holmby Hills.
- Bradley Bell and wife Colleen Bell resides in Holmby Hills with children.
- David I. Saperstein and his ex-wife Suzanne Saperstein built Fleur de Lys in 2002. It was designed by architect Richardson Robertson III. After their divorce, the mansion spent many years on the market, with many rumors floating regarding its sale. The property eventually sold in March 2014 for $88.3 million to an anonymous buyer.
- Jeremy Renner and Kristoffer Winters purchased an art deco-style mansion called The Reserve in Holmby Hills for US$7 million in 2010 and renovated it with the help of architect Phillip Vertoch. They then sold it for US$24 million in 2013.
- Kylie Jenner bought a $36.5 million mansion in Holmby Hills.
- Eva Gabor, actress and socialite lived at 100 Delfern Drive from 1974 to 1995.

== See also ==
- List of largest houses in the Los Angeles Metropolitan Area
- Westside (Los Angeles County)
