= Holmby Park =

Park in Los Angeles County, California, United States of America

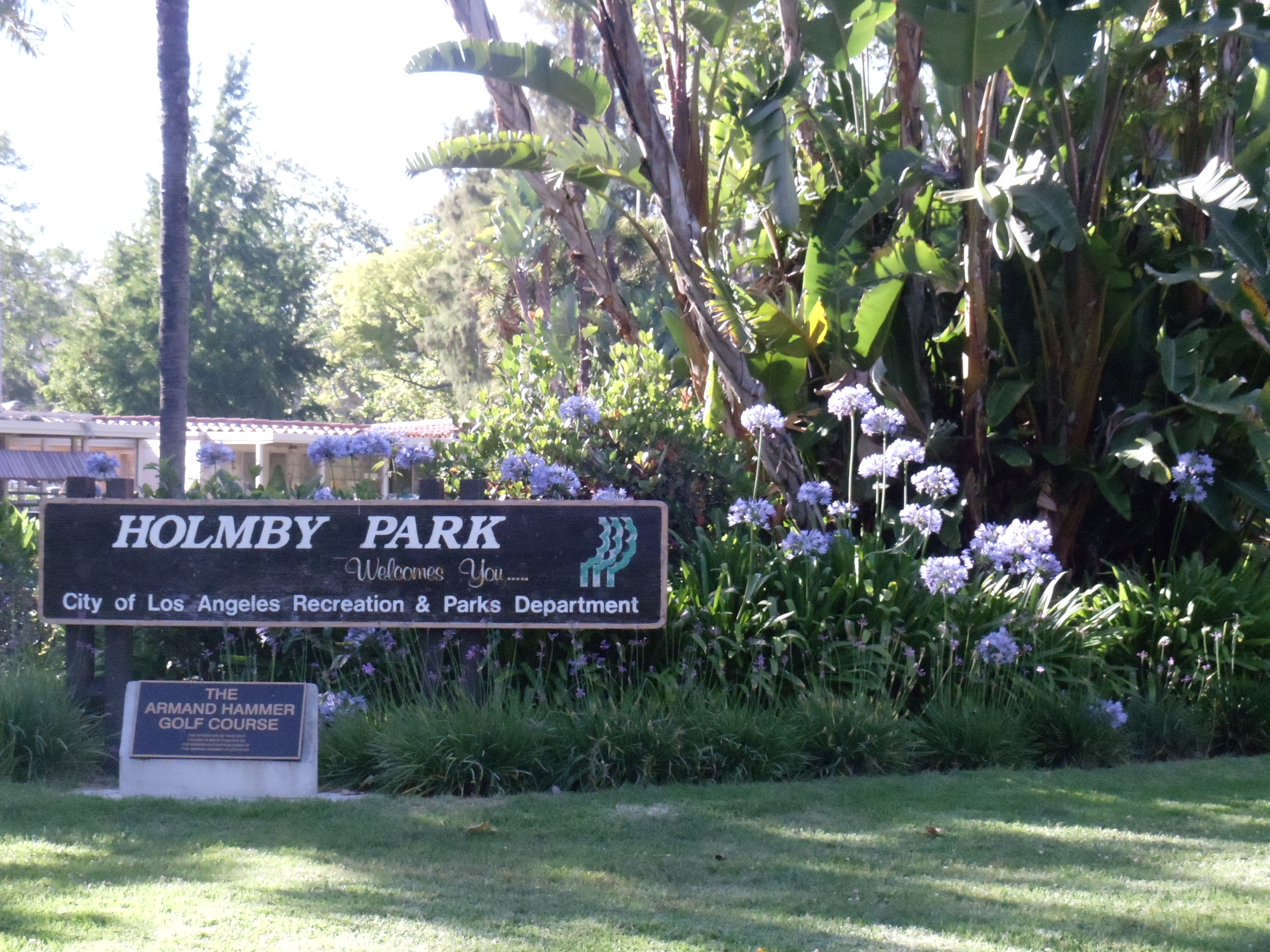

- Location within the Los Angeles metropolitan area Location within California Location within the United States
- Type: Municipal
- Location: 601 Club View Drive, Holmby Hills, Los Angeles
- Coordinates: 34.072395°N 118.429679°W
- Open: From dawn to dusk

Holmby Park is a public park in Holmby Hills, Los Angeles, California.

== Location ==
The park is located in Holmby Hills, Los Angeles, California. It is surrounded by Club View Drive, Beverly Glen Boulevard, Comstock Avenue, and the Los Angeles Country Club. South Mapleton Drive, which eventually leads to the Playboy Mansion, takes off from Club View Drive. The Manor can be seen from the park, as it is located across the street on the corner of Club View Drive and South Mapleton Drive.

== History ==
The land was deeded by the Janss Investment Company, the developers of Holmby Hills, to the City of Los Angeles to create a public park in the 1920s. In 1954, it was dedicated by the Daughters of the American Revolution.

Due to its location, the park has been frequented by celebrities over the years. In the 1950s, Frank Sinatra frequented Holmby Park. In the late 1960s, former president Ronald Reagan, who was governor of California at the time, lived a block from the park, and would visit on several occasions. Reagan also frequented the park in the late 1990s, during the last few years of his life. In the 1980s, composer Nelson Riddle (1921–1985) would meet his son Skip Riddle in Holmby Park at 8:30am on weekdays to talk about personal matters.

In 1996, a dispute occurred between nature lovers and lawn bowlers after trees had been felled to prevent the grass from going brown because of too much shade from leafy trees. However, nature lovers objected to it, arguing the trees had been planted by the Jansses in the 1920s, and the lawn bowling club had no right to fell the trees of a public park. The Holmby Park Lawn Bowling Club is open to all and the park administration sided with the lawn bowlers.

== Facilities ==
The park includes facilities such as barbecue pits, a children's play area, and picnic tables. Signs in the park remind users that dogs must be kept on leashes, and the following activities are forbidden: rollerskating, skateboarding, bicycling, the consumption of alcohol, the use of portable barbecues, littering, and loitering.

It is home to the Armand Hammer Golf Course, named for Armand Hammer (1898–1990), a Holmby Hills resident and founder of Occidental Petroleum. It was formerly called the Holmby Park Pony Course. As made manifest on signs in the park, only registered golfers are allowed on the putting green and turfgrass.

It is also home to the Holmby Park Lawn Bowling Club, which was started in 1927. The club has 150 members from 19 different countries.

== Cultural references ==
=== Movies ===
The movie High School Hellcats (dir. Edward L. Bernds, 1958), starring Yvonne Lime Fedderson and Brett Halsey, was shot on Comstock Avenue, with Holmby Park in the background.

=== Poetry ===
Poet James L. McMichael describes Holmby Park as "triangular, genteel" in his 1994 poem Each in a Place Apart.

== Gallery ==
Holmby Park
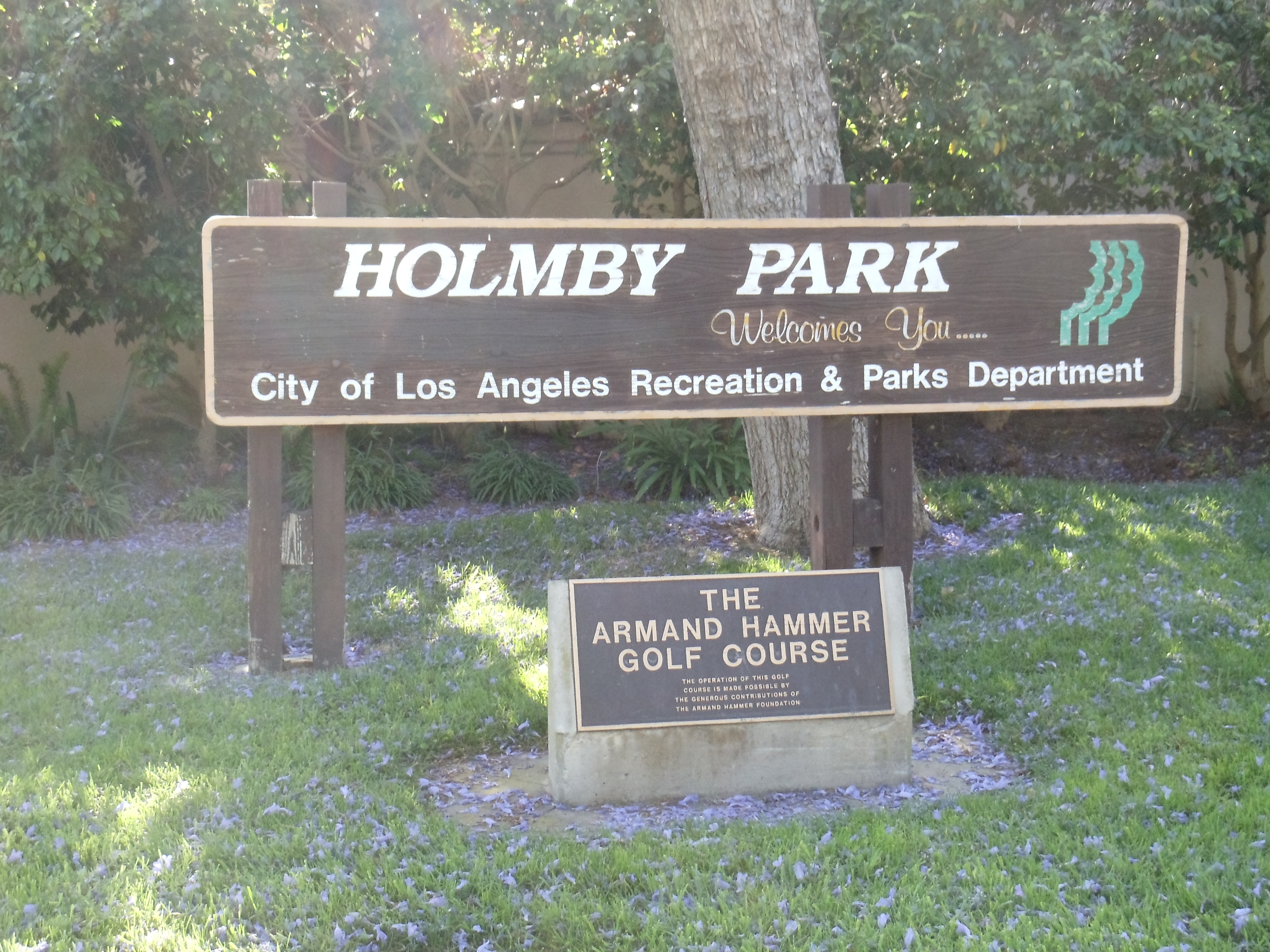
Sign of Holmby Park

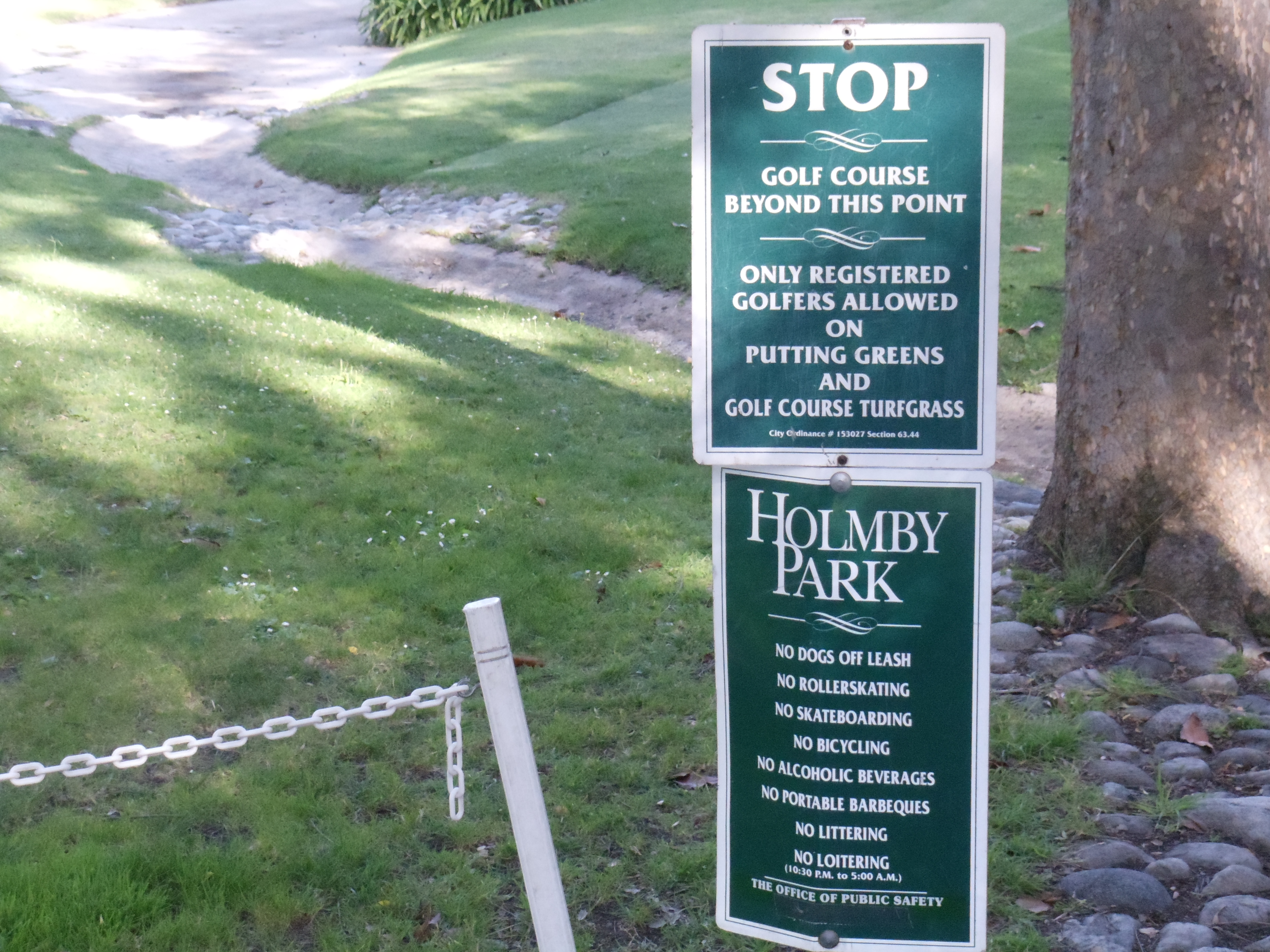
Sign giving instructions about the Armand Hammer Golf Course and park rules

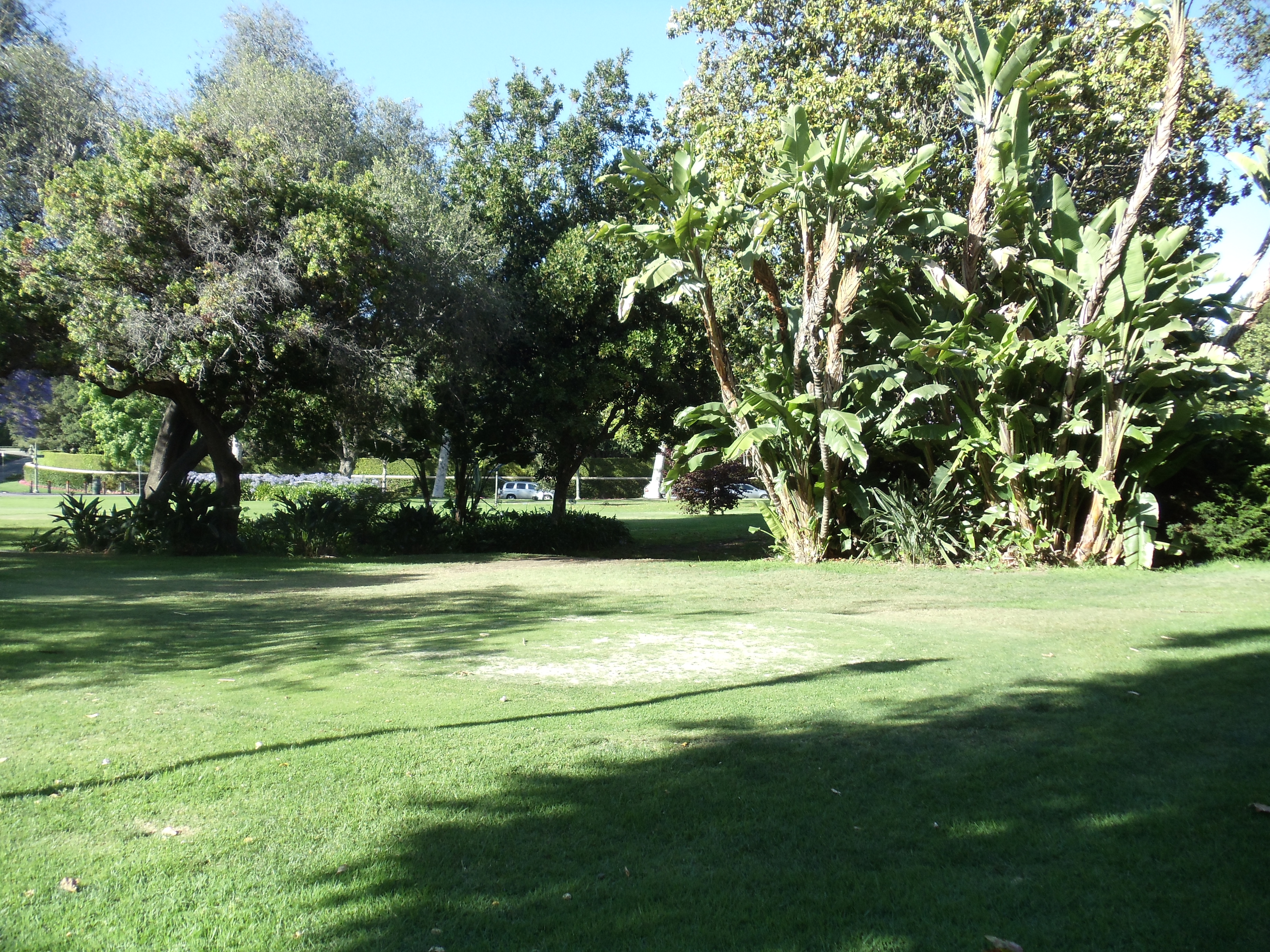
Trees in Holmby Park

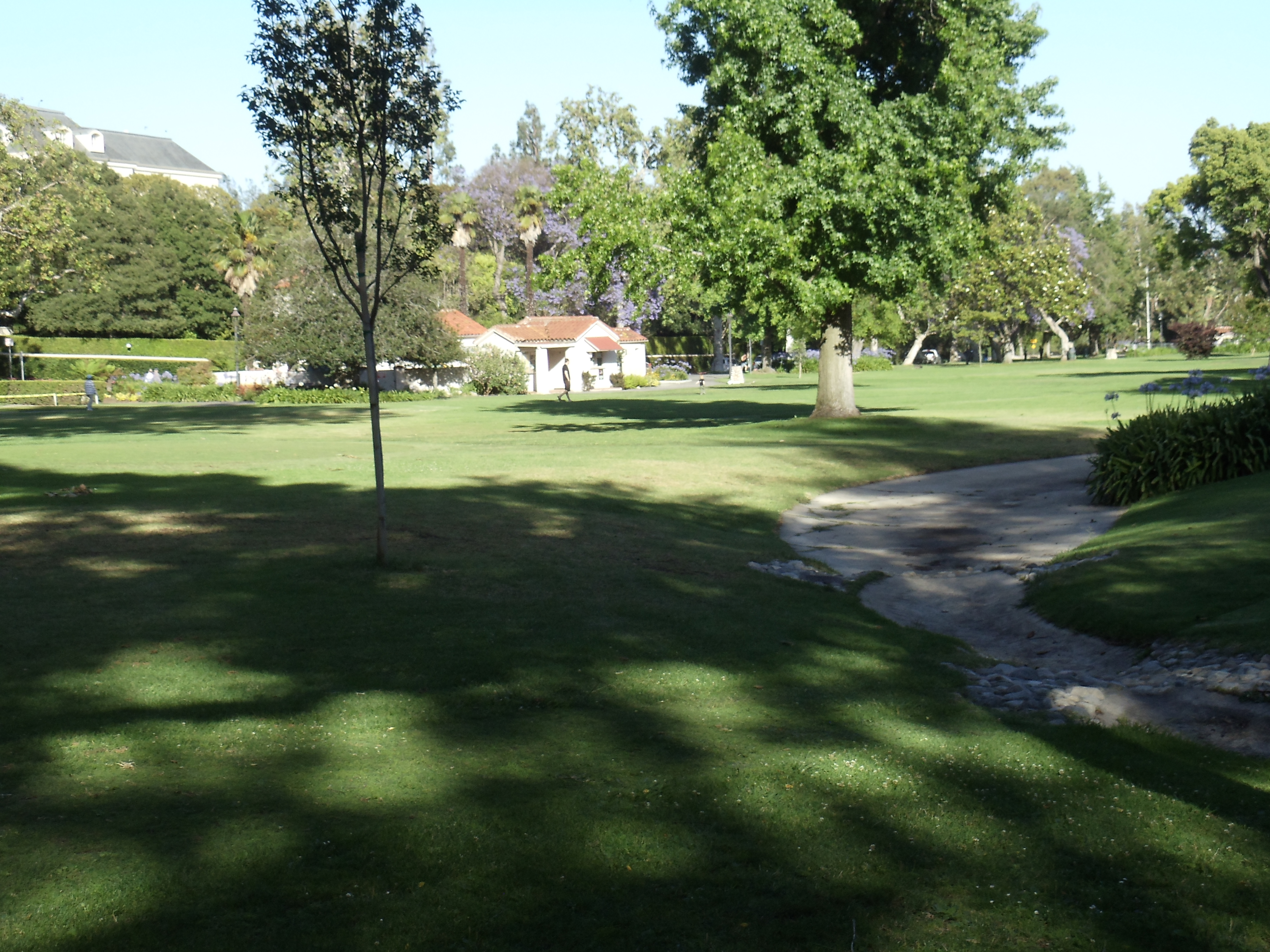
View of Holmby Park with the restrooms in the background and The Manor beyond

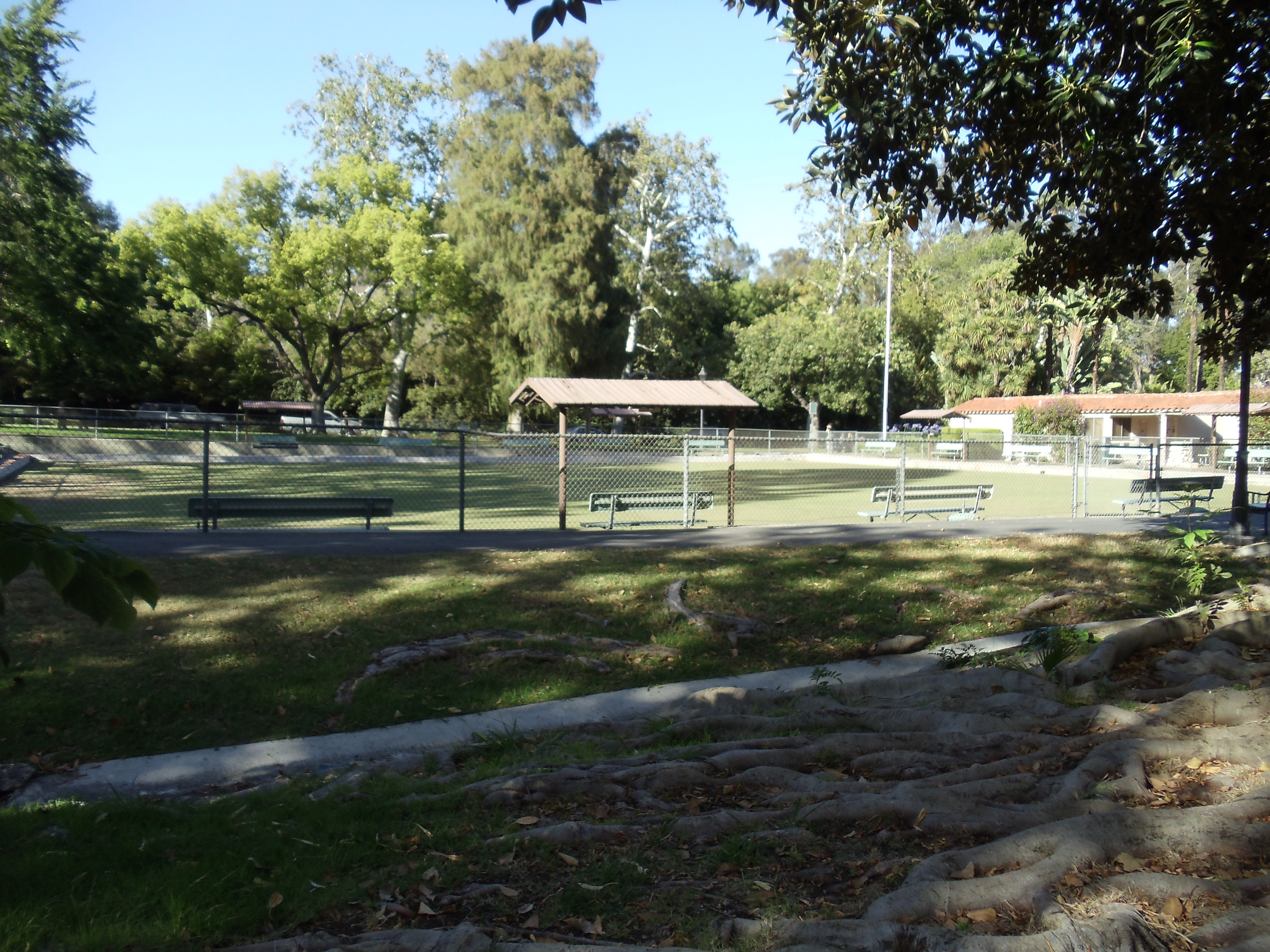
Bowling green in Holmby Park

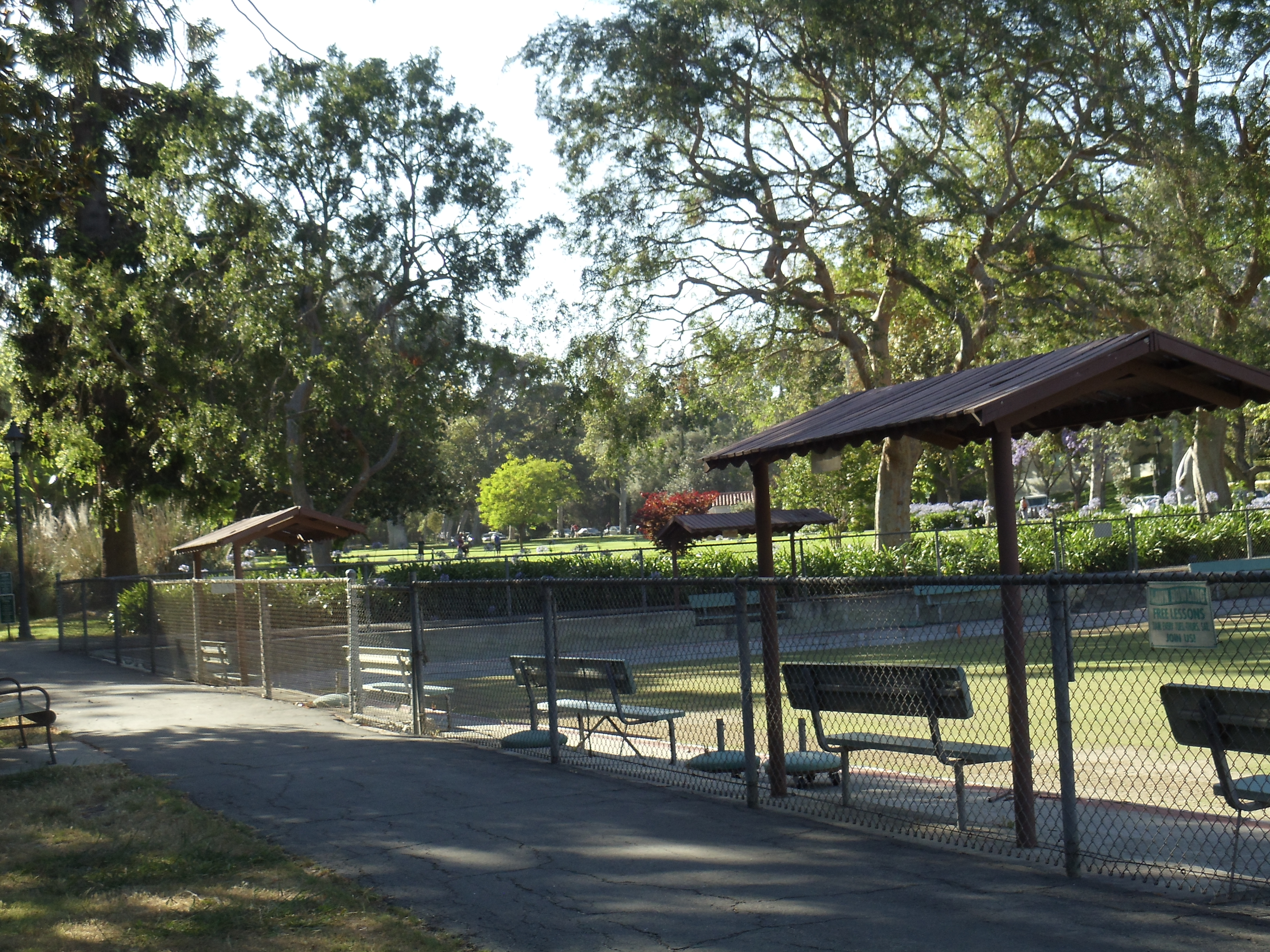
Another view of Holmby Park

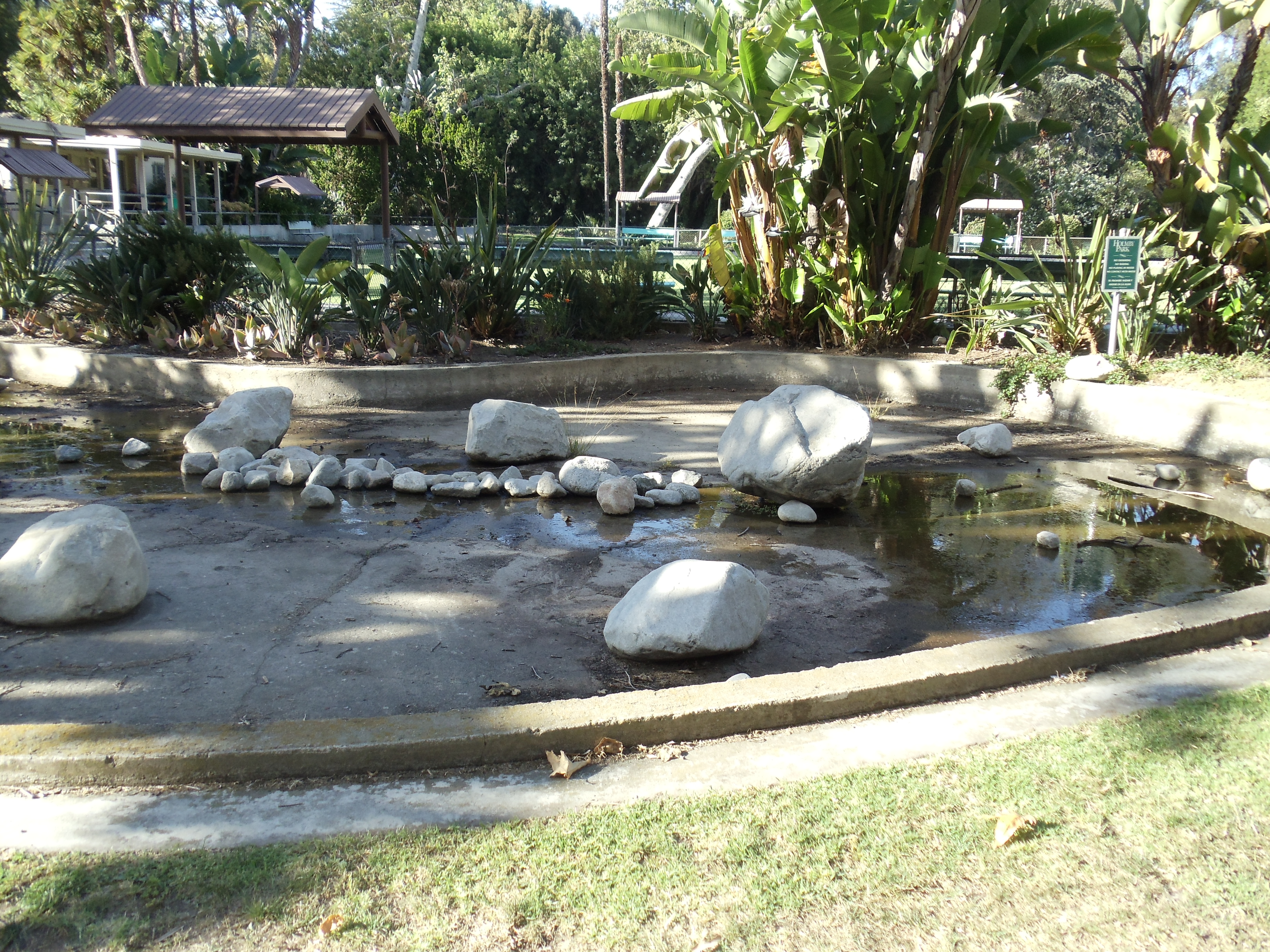
Dried-up pond in Holmby Park

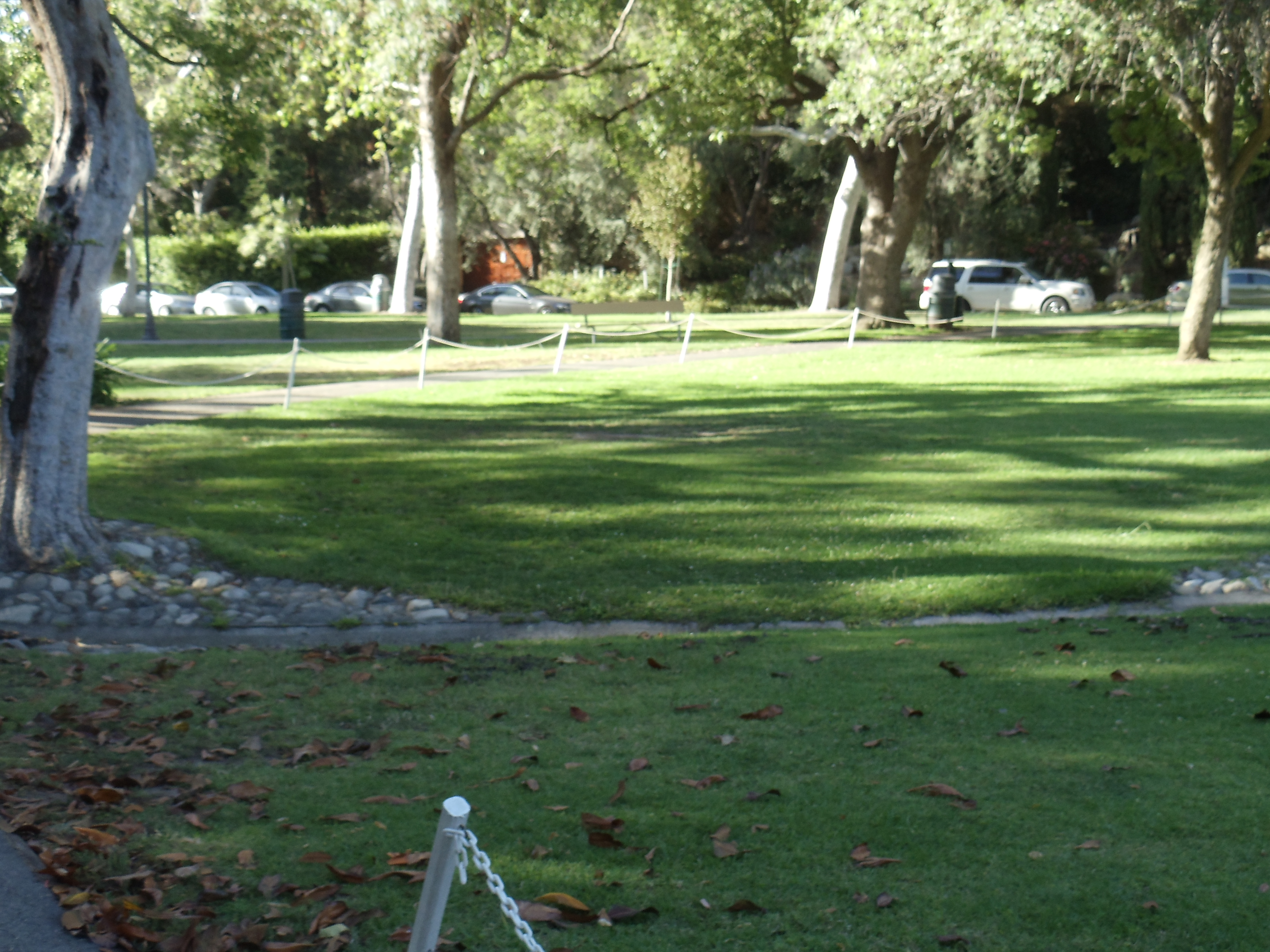
More view of Holmby Park

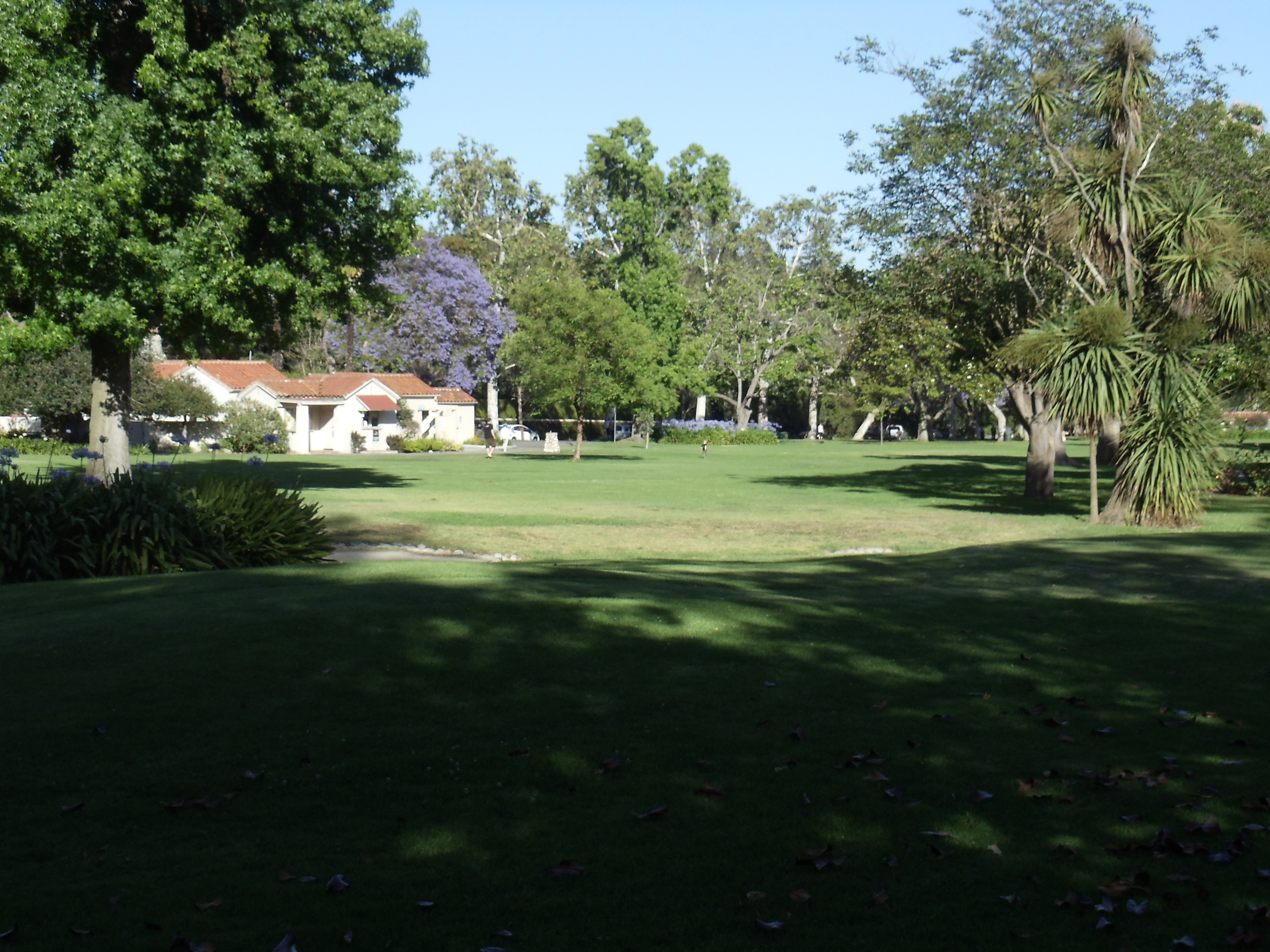
Yet another view of Holmby Park with the restrooms in the background

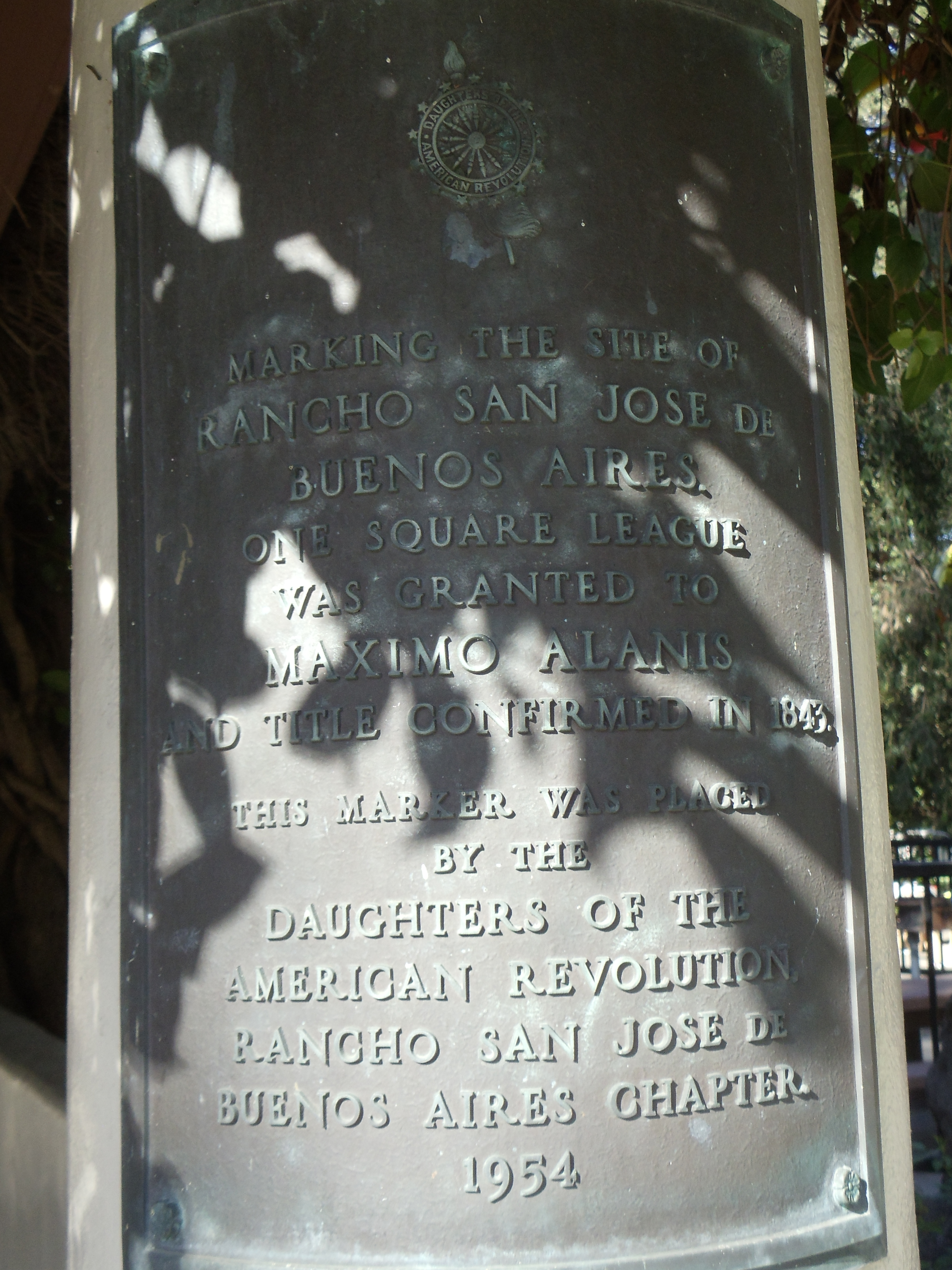
Plaque about Rancho San Jose de Buenos Ayres in Holmby Park dedicated by the Daughters of the American Revolution in 1954

== See also ==
- List of parks in Los Angeles
