= Allison & Allison =

American architectural firm (1910–1969)

Practice information
- Partners: James Edward Allison; David Clark Allison
- Founded: 1904
- Dissolved: 1969
- Location: Pittsburgh, Pennsylvania, and Los Angeles, California

Significant works and honors
- Buildings: Royce Hall; Friday Morning Club numerous schools and libraries

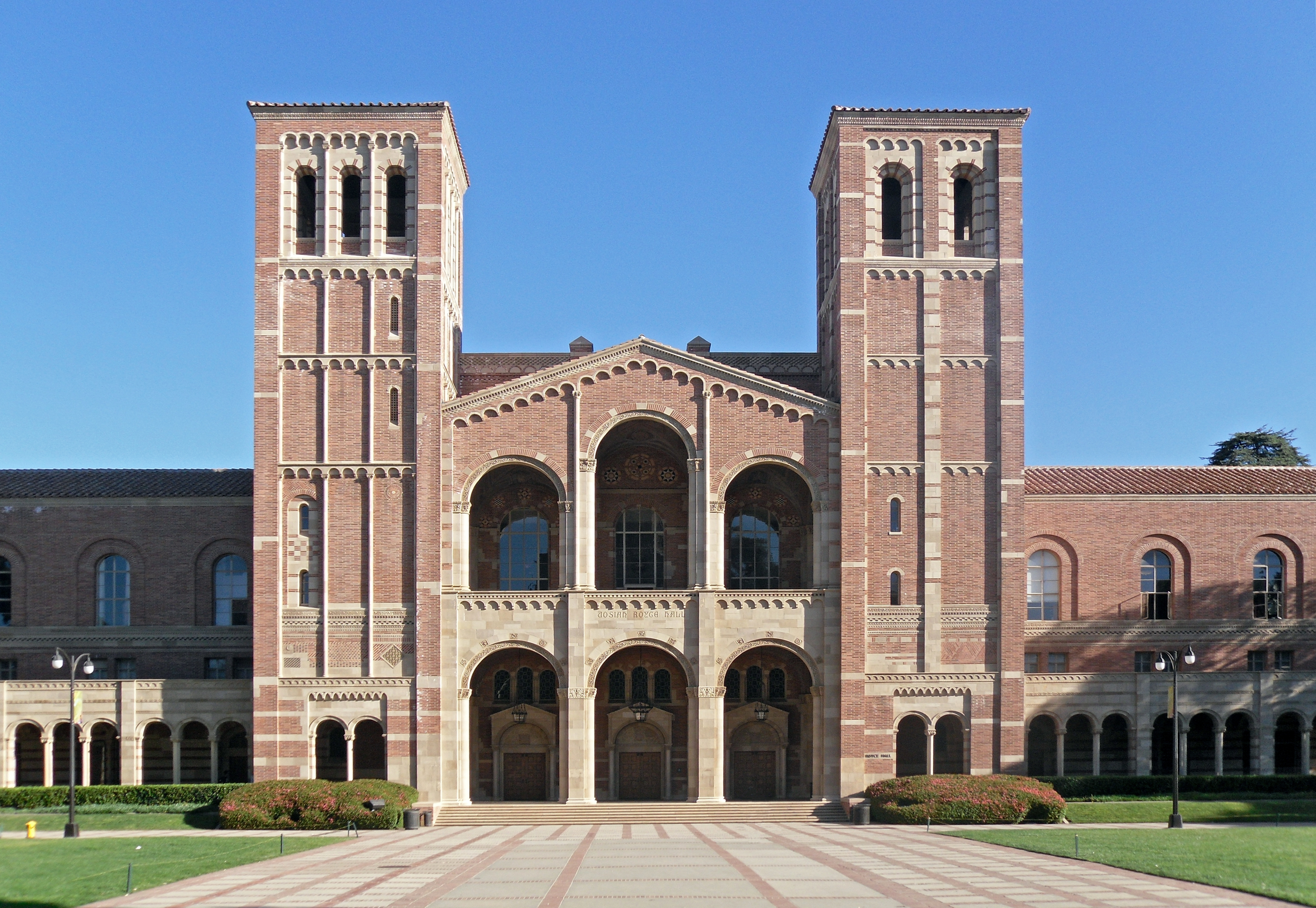
Royce Hall at the University of California Los Angeles

Allison & Allison was the architectural firm of brothers James E. Allison (1870 – 1955) and David C. Allison (1881 – 1962). They established their firm in Pittsburgh in 1904 and moved to Los Angeles in 1910, where they became well known for their institutional building designs. After their retirements, the firm was continued by their nephew and others, under different names, until its acquisition by Leo A. Daly in 1969.

== History ==
James Edward Allison was born on February 22, 1870 in Hookstown, Pennsylvania. James did not finish high school, but he did train in architectural drawing at night school. His first employers were Shepley, Rutan & Coolidge in Pittsburgh and Adler & Sullivan in Chicago, and he opened his own office in 1893.

David Clark Allison was born on May 14, 1881. He was educated in architecture at the University of Pennsylvania, where he graduated in 1904. He became his brother's partner shortly after. David also spent a year in 1909–10 in Paris studying at Eugène Duquesne's atelier.

Allison & Allison was formed in Pittsburgh in 1904, with James serving as firm superintendent and David as chief designer. In 1910, shortly after David returned from Paris, the brothers moved to Los Angeles.

In Los Angeles, the brothers developed a specialty in institutional buildings such as libraries and public schools. The two were awarded projects designing Santa Monica High School and the original campus of the University of California Los Angeles (UCLA) within two years of arrival. Both projects were sprawling academic complexes that cemented their reputation in the area. The two were subsequently hired to design several buildings UCLA's second campus, including Royce Hall which later became a symbol of the university. In 1936, the brothers became UCLA's supervising architect, where they oversaw all construction on campus; they kept this position until David's retirement.

=== Successors ===
James retired in 1942 and David retired c. 1947. In 1939, the brothers admitted their nephew, George B. Allison, to the partnership. George had previously worked for the film since 1930. In 1944, employee U. Floyd Rible was made partner; the firm was thus renamed Allison & Rible. In 1958, Raymond Ziegler and chief designer Rodney Robinson became partners, after which the firm was renamed Allison, Rible, Robinson & Ziegler in 1966. In 1969, the firm merged with the Omaha-based Leo A. Daly Co.. Allison, Rible, and Robinson retired over the next several years, leaving only Ziegler, and in 1974, Ziegler established his own film, after which Daly removed Allison from his firm's name.

== Legacy ==
The work of Allison & Allison reflects the clecticism of early twentieth-century American architecture. David Allison, as an American product of the Beaux-Arts system, freely, or eclecticly, adapted the forms of past architectural styles for new uses on Beaux-Arts principles. One of the major principles of Beaux-Arts architecture, as defined by American architect John Harbeson, was "character," or how a building is to be made appropriate for its site and program. While the Beaux-Arts in France had a strong bias towards neoclassicism, its American students drew from a much wider group of styles. To design a building with an appropriate character, Americans frequently chose forms and styles thought to be appropriate for the history and climate of its region. For Allison in California, that meant the Mediterranean and Spanish Colonial; for an architect in another part of the country, such as New England, it would mean something completely different. George Allison, a later product of the same system, reoriented the firm's work towards modernism, though like many of his contemporaries he freely mixed Beaux-Arts and modernist principles to obtain what they would consider appropriate character. Architectural historian Richard Guy Wilson described this type of work as the "final stage of evolution" of classicism.

At least ten buildings designed by the firm, alone or with others, have been listed on the United States National Register of Historic Places. California architects Rose Connor and William Henry Harrison worked for the firm.

Throughout its existence, the Allison firm was well respected by the architectural community. The three Allisons, Rible and Ziegler were all elected Fellows of the American Institute of Architects (AIA). Rible was also the recipient of the Edward C. Kemper Award, for service to the AIA, in 1970 and served as chancellor of the College of Fellows for 1973.

== Projects ==
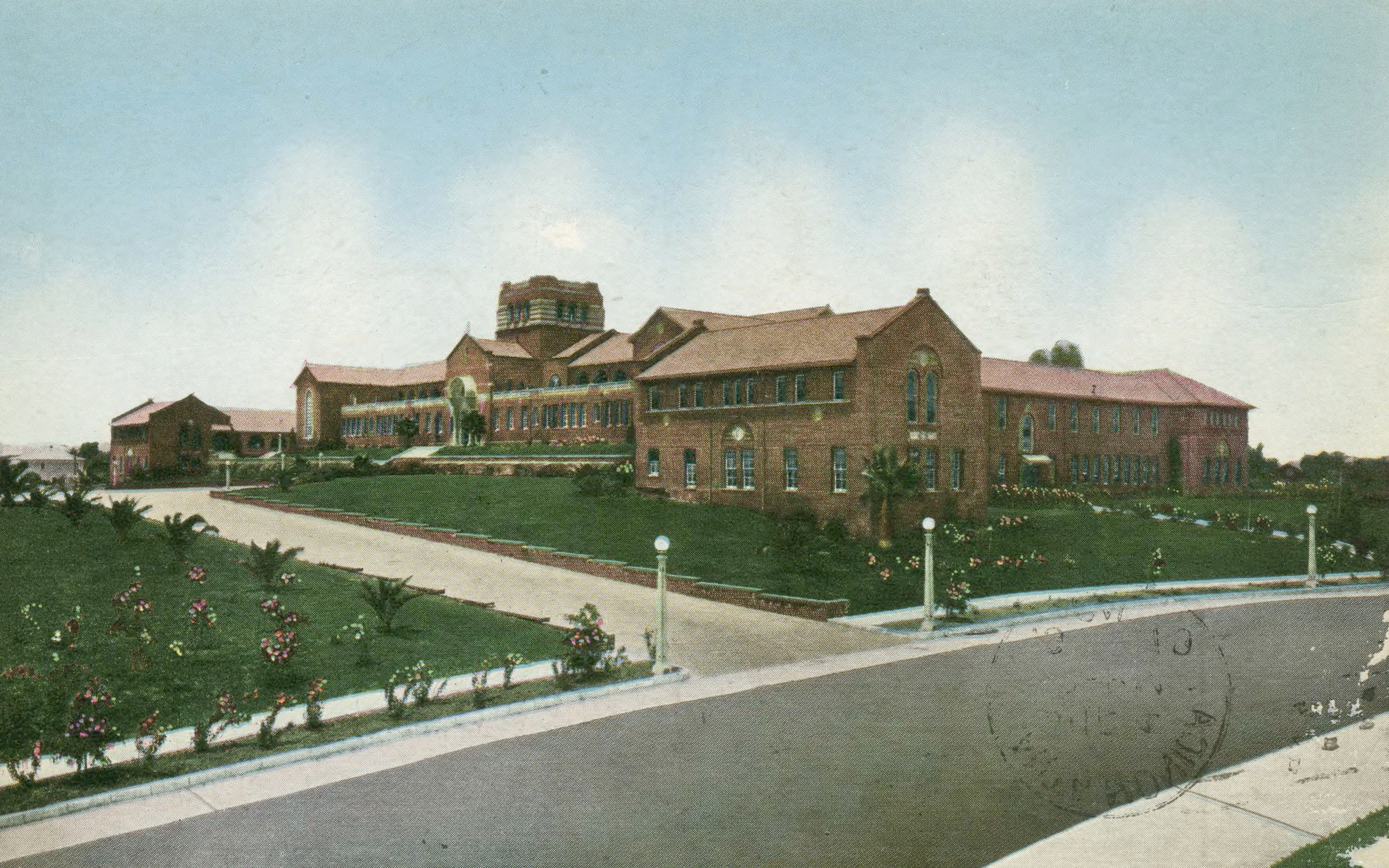
The original Santa Monica High School

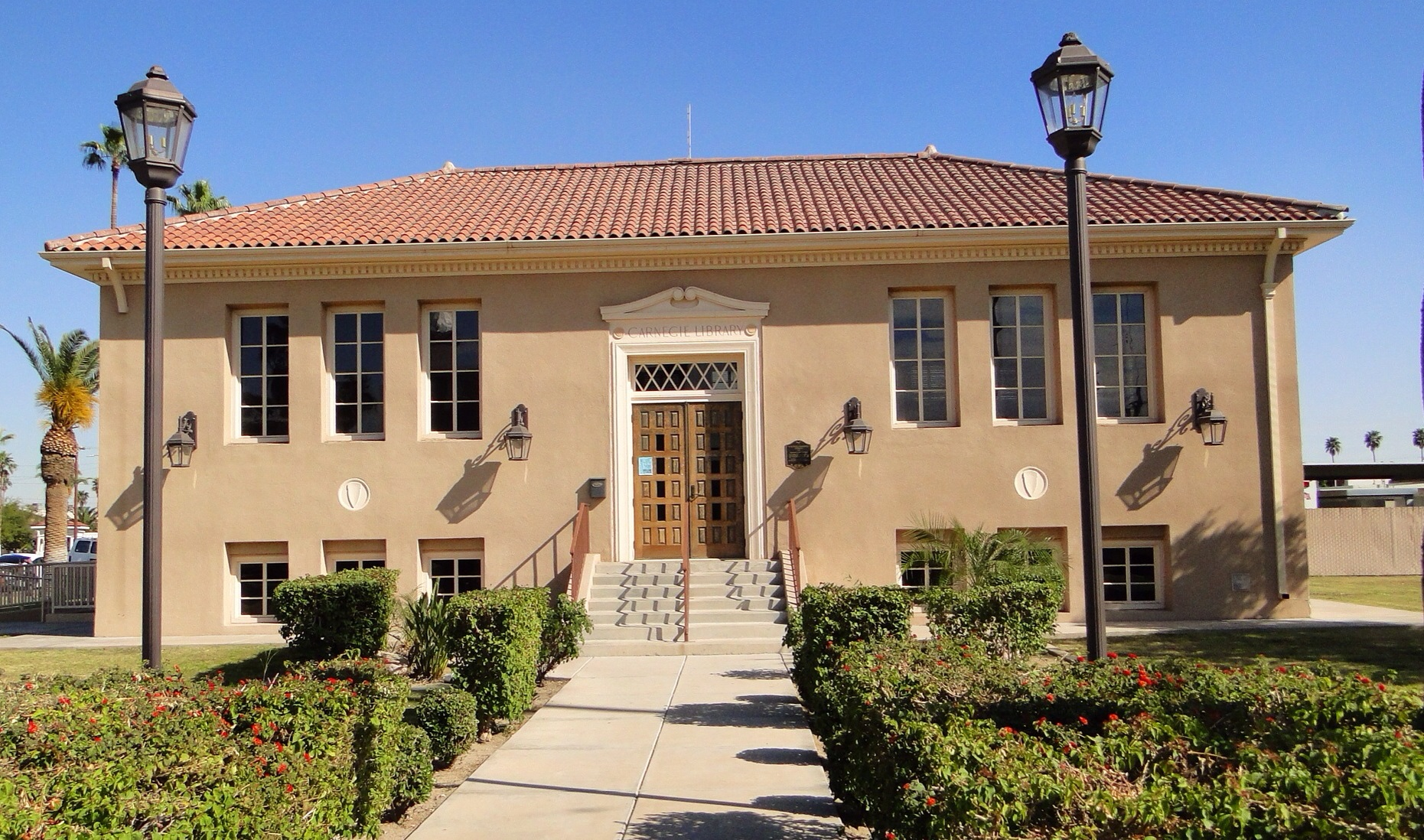
Calexico Carnegie Library

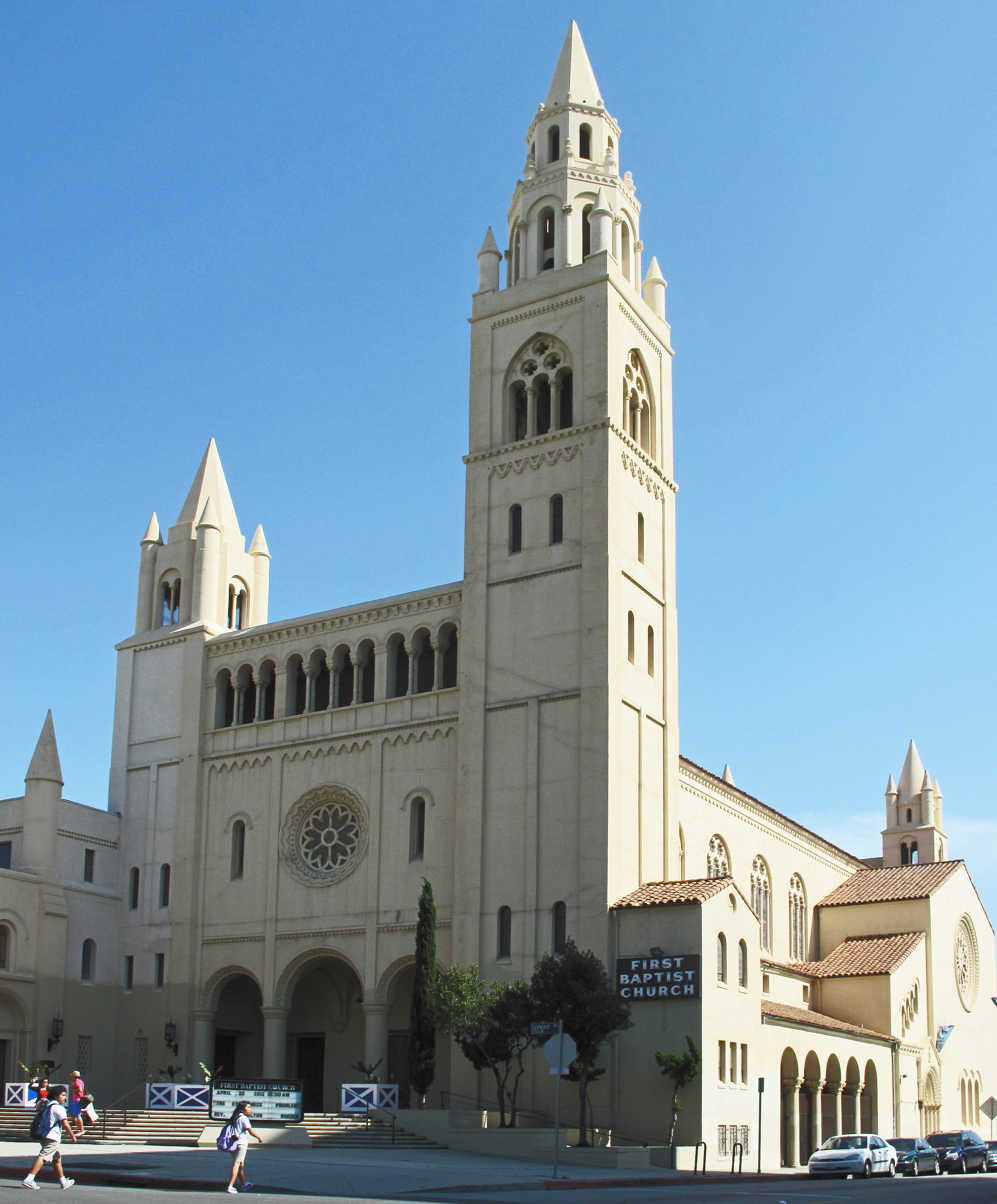
First Baptist Church of Los Angeles

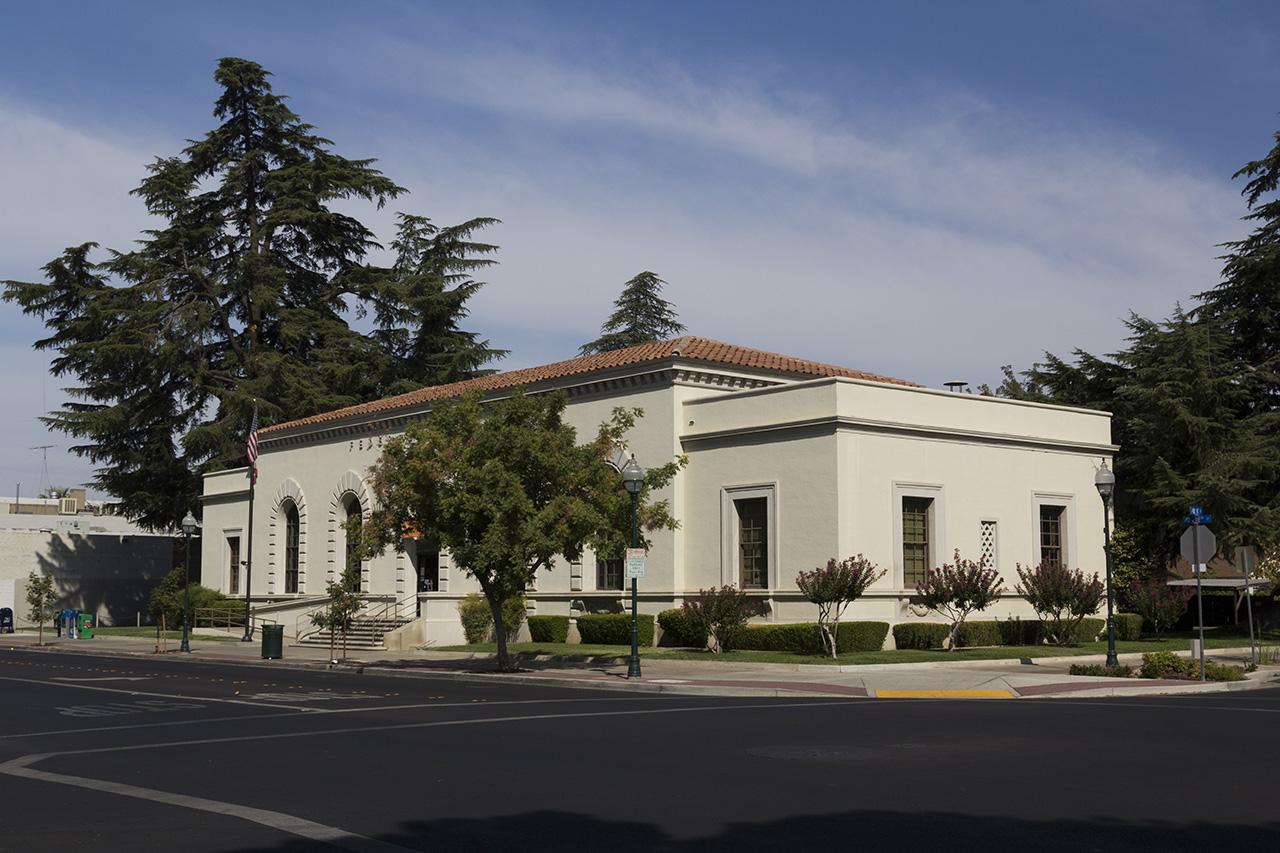
United States Post Office in Merced

Works by Allison & Allison include (in Los Angeles, California unless otherwise noted):

=== National Register of Historic Places ===
- Calexico Carnegie Library (1918), Calexico, California
- Chandler High School (1922), Chandler, Arizona
- Las Vegas Grammar School (1923), Las Vegas, Nevada
- Friday Morning Club (1924)
- Van Nuys Branch Library (1926)
- Washington Irving Branch Library (1927)
- Merced Post Office (1932), Merced, California

=== Other ===
- Becht Hall, Clarion State Normal School (1908), Clarion, Pennsylvania
- Bethel Presbyterian Church (1910), Bethel Park, Pennsylvania
- Santa Monica High School (1912, demolished), Santa Monica, California
- Los Angeles City College campus (1914, demolished)
- Western Pacific Building (1925)
- First Baptist Church (1927),
- First Unitarian Church (1927)
- Janss Investment Company Building (1929)
- Kaplan Hall, University of California Los Angeles (UCLA) (1929)
- Royce Hall, UCLA (1929)
- Thirteenth Church of Christ, Scientist (1930)
- Wilshire United Methodist Church (1931)
- Kaufman Hall, UCLA (1932)

=== Consulting, associate, or supervising ===
- Wilshire Boulevard Temple (1929), NRHP-listed consulting
- Kerckhoff Hall, UCLA (1930), supervising
- Southern California Edison Company Building (1931), supervising
- First Congregational Church (1932), supervising
- Beverly Hills Main Post Office (1934), Beverly Hills, California, consulting, NRHP-listed
- Hollywood Post Office (1937), associates, NRHP-listed

=== Successor firm ===
- Engineering Building I, UCLA (1949, demolished 2011)
- McKenna Auditorium, Claremont McKenna College (1953), Claremont, California
- West Los Angeles Regional Branch Library (1956)
- Cypress Hall, California State University, Northridge (1960)
