= National Register of Historic Places listings in Imperial County, California =

Location of Imperial County in California

This is a list of the National Register of Historic Places listings in Imperial County, California.

This is intended to be a complete list of the properties and districts on the National Register of Historic Places in Imperial County, California, United States. Latitude and longitude coordinates are provided for many National Register properties and districts; these locations may be seen together in a Google map.

There are 12 properties and districts listed on the National Register in the county, including 1 National Historic Landmark.

This National Park Service list is complete through NPS recent listings posted September 4, 2026.

== Current listings ==
| | Name on the Register | Image | Date listed | Location | City or town | Description |
|---|---|---|---|---|---|---|
| 1 | Calexico Carnegie Library | Calexico Carnegie Library | September 28, 2005 (#05001085) | 420 Heber Ave. 32°40′10″N 115°29′33″W | Calexico | |
| 2 | Desert View Tower | Desert View Tower | August 29, 1980 (#80000801) | SW of Ocotillo; 32°39′33″N 116°05′57″W | Ocotillo | |
| 3 | Fages-De Anza Trail-Southern Emigrant Road | Fages-De Anza Trail-Southern Emigrant Road | January 29, 1973 (#73002252) | Anza-Borrego State Park; 32°52′45″N 116°06′11″W | Borrego Springs | |
| 4 | Southwest Lake Cahuilla Recessional Shoreline Archeological District | | December 30, 1999 (#99001567) | Address Restricted | Salton City | Archeological sites along shoreline of former Lake Cahuilla |
| 5 | Spoke Wheel Rock Alignment | | September 29, 2003 (#03000120) | Address Restricted | Ocotillo | |
| 6 | Stonehead (L-7) | | May 1, 1987 (#87001026) | Address Restricted | Yuma | |
| 7 | US Inspection Station-Calexico | US Inspection Station-Calexico | February 14, 1992 (#91001749) | 12 Heffernan Ave. 32°39′55″N 115°29′41″W | Calexico | |
| 8 | US Post Office-El Centro Main | US Post Office-El Centro Main | January 11, 1985 (#85000125) | 230 S. 5th St. 32°47′27″N 115°33′14″W | El Centro | |
| 9 | Winterhaven Anthropomorph (L-8) | | May 1, 1987 (#87001025) | Address Restricted | Yuma | |
| 10 | Winterhaven Anthropomorph and Bowknot, L-9 | | October 25, 1985 (#85003429) | Address Restricted | Winterhaven | |
| 11 | Yuha Basin Discontiguous District | | May 24, 1982 (#82002185) | Address Restricted | Plaster City | |
| 12 | Yuma Crossing and Associated Sites | Yuma Crossing and Associated Sites | November 13, 1966 (#66000197) | Banks of the Colorado River; 32°43′48″N 114°37′05″W | Winterhaven | |

== See also ==
- List of National Historic Landmarks in California
- National Register of Historic Places listings in California
- California Historical Landmarks in Imperial County, California
