= Calexico Carnegie Library =

- U.S. National Register of Historic Places
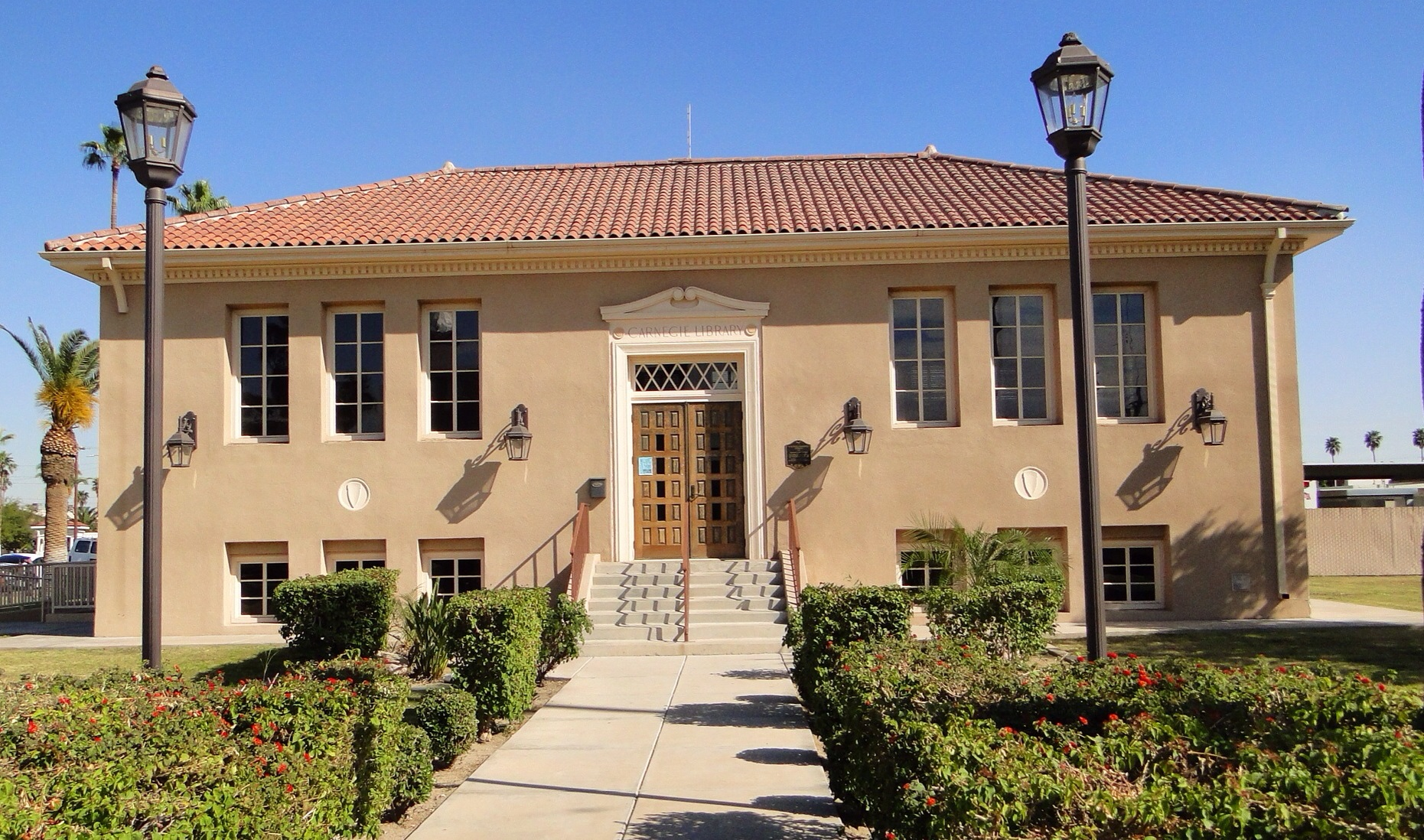

- Location within California Location within the United States
- Location: 420 Heber Ave., Calexico, California
- Coordinates: 32°40′10″N 115°29′33″W
- Area: less than one acre
- Built: 1918
- Architect: Allison & Allison
- Architectural style: Spanish Colonial Revival
- MPS: California Carnegie Libraries MPS
- NRHP reference No.: 05001085
- Added to NRHP: September 28, 2005

The Calexico Carnegie Library is a Carnegie library located at 420 Heber Ave. in Calexico, Imperial County, California

== History ==
The library was built in 1918 through a $10,000 grant from the Carnegie Foundation; while Calexico had initially requested a $25,000 grant, the Foundation felt that the town's size did not merit the larger amount.

The library was designed by Los Angeles architects Allison & Allison in the Spanish Colonial Revival style and features a tile hip roof and a front entrance flanked by pilasters and topped by a scroll. Its original design was more lavish but became simplified due to the Carnegie Foundation's reduced support for the building.

The building served as the city's library until 1986, when a new library building opened. The building was used as a storage facility until it was restored in 2007; it is now a branch of the Calexico City Library and serves as a public technology center.

The Calexico Carnegie Library was added to the National Register of Historic Places on September 28, 2005.
