= United States Post Office (Merced, California) =

- U.S. Post Office
- U.S. National Register of Historic Places
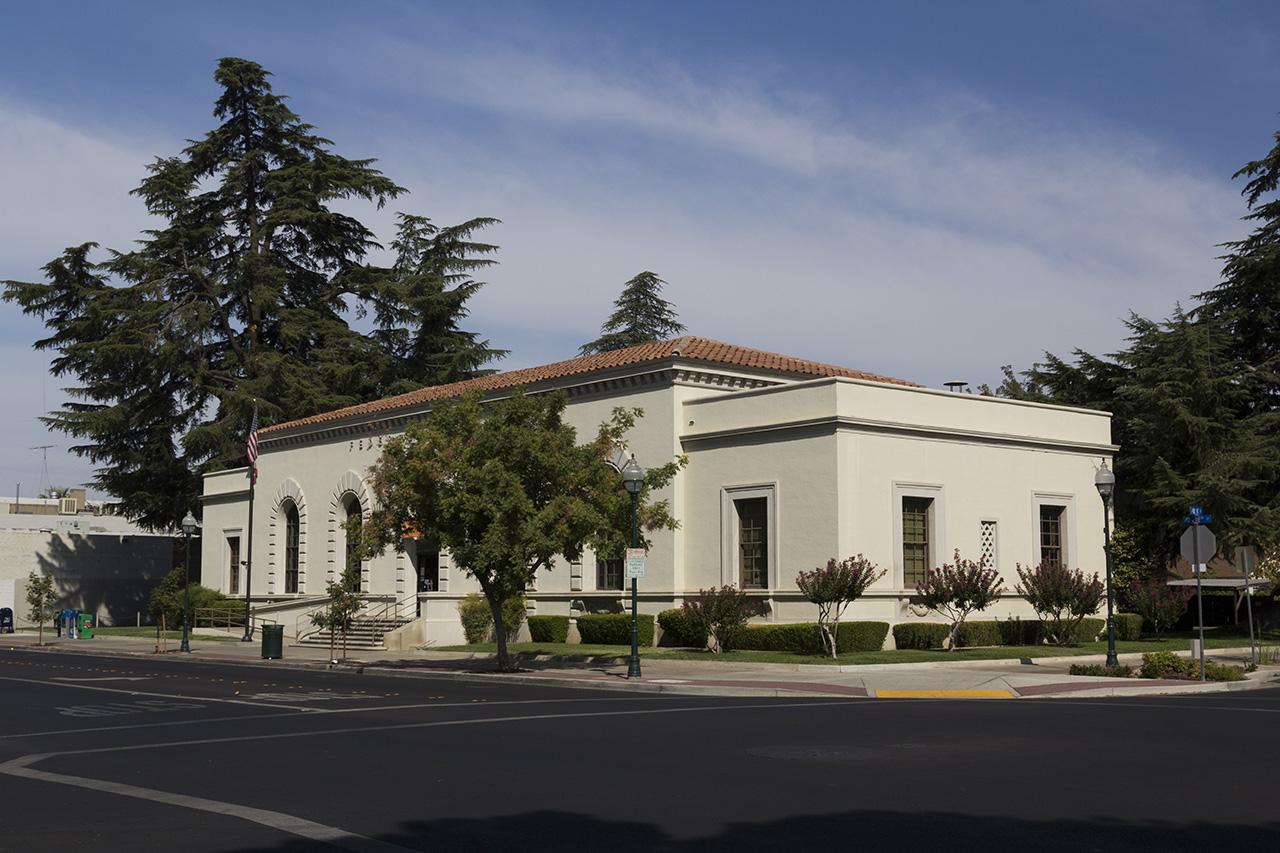

- Location within California Location within the United States
- Location: 401 W. 18th St., Merced, California
- Coordinates: 37°18′8″N 120°28′50″W
- Area: 0.6 acres (0.24 ha)
- Built: 1933
- Architect: Allison & Allison
- NRHP reference No.: 83001208
- Added to NRHP: February 10, 1983

The Bell Station, also known as the Federal Building, is a U.S. post office located at 401 W. 18th St. in Merced, California. The post office was built in 1933 as part of a public works program started by Herbert Hoover. The building was designed by Los Angeles architects Allison & Allison in the Mediterranean Revival style; its design includes a tile roof, stucco walls, and arched windows with terra cotta surrounds. The building's use of Mediterranean elements in an unadorned design reflected the notion of "starved classicism" used in many of Hoover's public works projects; this form of design used themes from classical styles in the plain manner of the Art Deco and Moderne styles. It was added to the National Register of Historic Places as the U.S. Post Office on February 10, 1983.

== Murals ==
The post office also includes two tempera murals, Jedediah Smith Crossing the Merced River by Helen Forbes and Vacheros by Dorothy Puccinelli, which were sponsored by the Section of Painting and Sculpture and painted by the two local artists in 1937.

== See also ==
- National Register of Historic Places listings in Merced County, California
- List of United States post offices
- List of United States post office murals
