= First Baptist Church of Los Angeles =

Los Angeles Historic-Cultural Monument

Coordinates: 34.058286°N 118.288622°W

- Front of the First Baptist Church of Los Angeles
- First Baptist Church of Los Angeles
- Location: 760 South Westmoreland Avenue, Los Angeles, CA 90005
- Country: United States
- Denomination: American Baptist Churches USA
- Website: fbcofla.org

History
- Founded: 1874

Architecture
- Architect: Allison & Allison
- Style: Spanish Gothic architecture
- Years built: 1927

Administration
- Division: American Baptist Churches of Los Angeles, Southwest and Hawaii

Clergy
- Pastor: Rev. Dr. Scott T. Arnold

First Baptist Church of Los Angeles is an American Baptist church located at 760 South Westmoreland Avenue in Los Angeles, California. It was designated Los Angeles Historic Cultural Monument 237 in 1981.

== History ==
On September 4, 1874, believers came together to pray. In the beginning, they met on North Spring Street, but by 1884, they moved into its first building at the corner of Sixth and Fort Streets, until 1898. Its construction was funded by donations from Isaac Newton Van Nuys (1836–1912) and James Boon Lankershim (1850–1931).

The second building, constructed in 1897, was located at 727 South Flower Street, and Dwight L. Moody (1837–1899) attended its dedication. Billy Sunday (1862–1935) preached there in 1913.

In 1927, a new church building, the current church, was designed by Allison & Allison in the Spanish Gothic style. It was modeled after the Ducal Palace in Mantua, Italy.

== Theological significance ==
Pentecostal revival in Los Angeles is said to have started in this church in 1905 thanks to Rev. Joseph Smale, after he had met Evan Roberts (1878–1951) on a trip to Wales.

Frank Bartleman (1871–1936) attended this church.

== Bibliography ==
- Sutton, Herbert L. (1974). Our Heritage and Our Hope: The History of First Baptist Church of Los Angeles, California, 1874-1974.
