= Janss Investment Company Building =

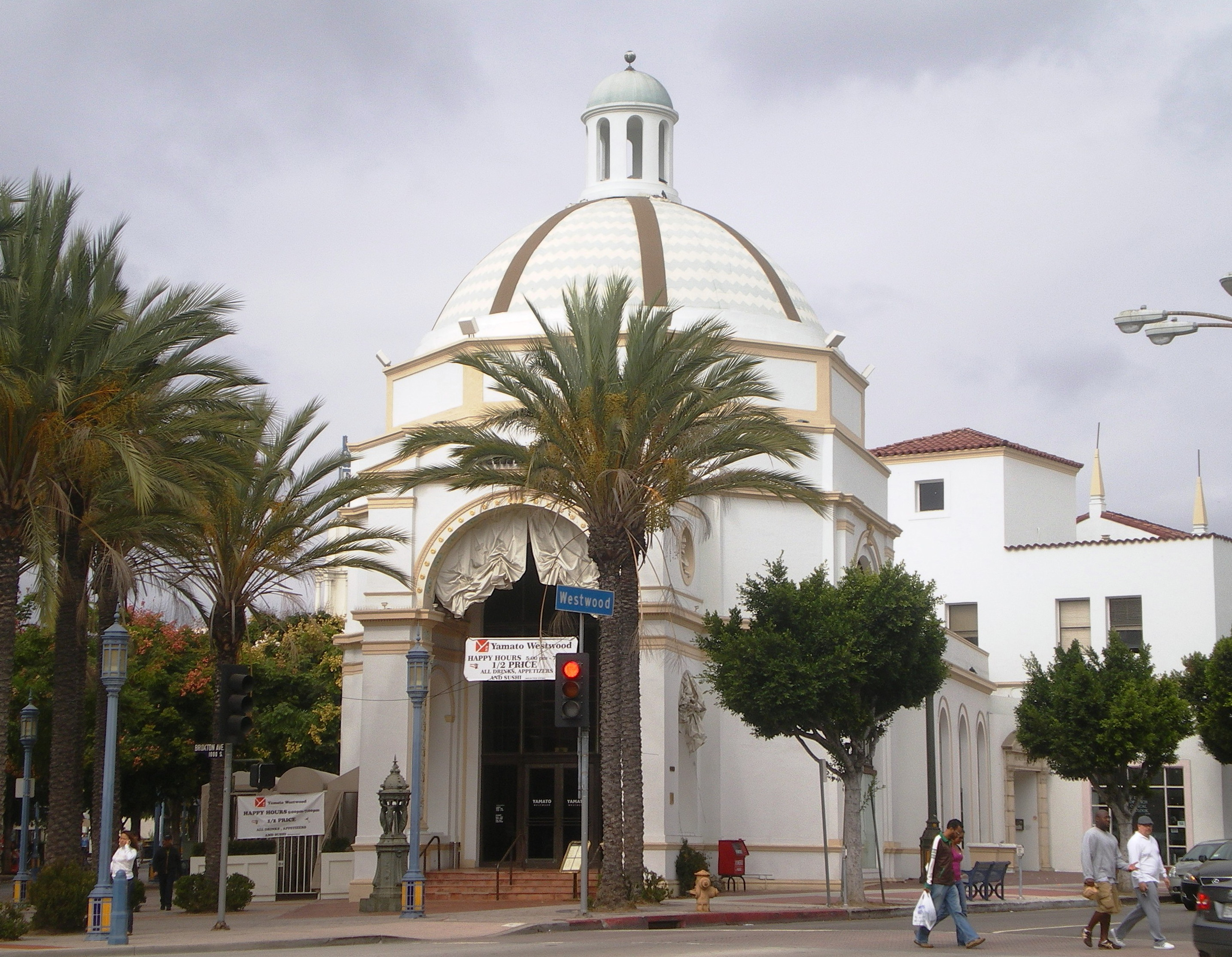
- The Janss Dome

- Location within the Los Angeles metropolitan area
- 34.0611°N 118.4456°W
- Location: 1045-1099 Westwood Boulevard, Westwood, Los Angeles, California

History
- Built: 1929

Site notes
- Architect: Allison & Allison

Los Angeles Historic-Cultural Monument
- Designated: June 21, 1988
- Reference no.: 364

The Janss Investment Company Building, also known as the Janss Dome, is a historic building in Westwood, Los Angeles, California, in the Westwood Village. The building is located at the five-way intersection of Westwood Boulevard, Kinross Avenue, and Broxton Avenue.

== Background ==
In 1929 the Janss Dome was the first building erected in the Mediterranean-themed Westwood Village. It housed the headquarters of the Janss Investment Company run by the Janss brothers, Edwin and Harold Janss, who were the developers of the village. The village was built as a shopping and cinema precinct to serve the adjacent University of California, Los Angeles (UCLA). The second floor of the Janss building was the first male dormitory for UCLA students.

The Janss Dome was designed by the architectural firm of Allison & Allison, who also designed UCLA's Royce Hall and Kerckhoff Hall. Architectural features of the building include a high portico and arched windows with the main part of the building having an octagonal shape and being surmounted by its signature dome with its Moorish style aqua and white zig-zag pattern and gold leafing. Atop the dome is a cupola. This dome ranks alongside the white Spanish Revival/Moderne tower of the Fox Theater as an iconic landmark of Westwood Village.

Around the beginning of the 1990s renowned architectural firm Morphosis adapted the dome for use as a clothing store by Contempo Casuals, and later it was occupied by a Wherehouse Music store. In 1998 restaurateur Michael Chow remodeled the interior for a Eurochow restaurant but had the time-honored aqua and white zig-zag on the rotunda painted over in white. This caused the Westwood Design Review Board to order that the dome be restored to its traditional decoration. The Janss Dome housed a Japanese restaurant, Yamato, until June 2016. In 1971, the Paramount Securities Corporation (Michael & Elliot Lewis) purchased the property from Bank of America. The property (dome section) was leased to Glendale Federal Savings and Loan. A cupola was placed on the dome, and an original Sir Richard Wallace fountain, dated 1872 (French), was added to the patio. The building is currently occupied by the Broxton Brewery & Public House.

The building housed a brewery, Broxton Brewery & Public House, from 2018 to 2025.

The Janss Investment Company Building was dedicated a Los Angeles Historic-Cultural Monument on June 21, 1988 (No. 364).
