= David I. Saperstein =

American entrepreneur

- Born: 1941 (age 84–85); Baltimore
- Citizenship: United States
- Occupation: businessman
- Known for: founder of Metro Networks
- Spouses: Phyllis Grief (divorced); Suzanne Carlstrand (m. 1986; div. 2006); Hillevi Svensson (1973–2019) (died 2019)
- Children: 7

David I. Saperstein (born 1941) is an American entrepreneur and founder of Metro Networks.

== Biography ==
Saperstein was born to Jewish parents in Baltimore. He dropped out of college to sell used cars. When he got stuck in a snowstorm he came up with the idea to sell traffic reports on the radio. He used his Ford Dealership to start his new venture in Baltimore. When Ford withdrew its support of Saperstein and he lost his dealership, he founded Metro Networks in 1978. the company grew to serve over 1,500 radio stations in the U.S. In 1996, Saperstein decided to take Metro Networks public on the Nasdaq exchange, stock symbol MTNT. He made his fortune when he sold the company to Westwood One in 1999 for $1.25 billion in stock. Now he operates tree farms in Texas and Florida: "It's a growing business," he once told a reporter for Forbes magazine. In 1988, Saperstein was elected to the Common Cause National Governing Board.

== Entrepreneurism ==
Saperstein began his career selling used cars in Baltimore, but quickly found there was a niche for radio programming to include traffic reports. While traffic reporting was already a part of radio programming in some cities, Saperstein found there was no single company providing concise reports for stations, either regionally or nationally.

In 1978 he founded Metro Networks, in Houston, Texas. The company grew, through the 1980s, into a veritable traffic reporting empire, and in 1996, Saperstein took the company public on the Nasdaq exchange.

In 1992, Saperstein's daughter married Shane Coppola in Baltimore, Maryland in a wedding that was described as "the social event of the season in the nation's capital." The wedding is referenced in the 1993 film Dave, starring Kevin Kline.

In 1998, Saperstein, with his son-in-law, Coppola, began negotiating a merger agreement with Westwood One, and in September 1999 three companies merged, Metro Networks, Copter Acquisition Corp. and Westwood One.

Only 9 days before the merger between Metro Networks and Westwood One, Saperstein started a new company called Five "S" Capital, Inc. Five "S" is an investment company that helps to fund new business development.

== Philanthropy ==
Saperstein sits on the boards of Cedars-Sinai Hospital and Music Center of Los Angeles. He is also a member of the Homeland Security Advisory Committee. In 2006, the Saperstein Critical Care tower that bears his name was opened at Cedars-Sinai Medical Center. Initially named the David and Suzanne Saperstein Tower, it had to be renamed after his rancorous divorce. In 2009, he donated $12 million to help build the Milken Middle School, a Jewish day school in Los Angeles, California; it was renamed the David Saperstein Middle School in his honor.

== Personal life ==
Saperstein has been married three times. He has two children with his first wife, Phyllis Grief – Michelle Saperstein Coppola and Jennifer Saperstein Kalapoutis. In 2006, Saperstein divorced his second wife of 23 years, Swedish philanthropist Suzanne (née Carlstrand) Saperstein, whom he married in 1986. He had the divorce papers served to her in Texas on a stopover on her way from California to Europe. They had three children – Jonathan (b. 1987), Alexis (b. 1988), and Stefanie (b 1990). Saperstein later married another Swedish woman, Hillevi Svensson (1973–2019) from Bua in Varberg, formerly nanny to his children. They had twins together. On January 2, 2019, Hillevi died while vacationing in Anguilla with David and their two children.

His cousin, Ken Mehlman was the former national Republican chair and president George W. Bush's strategist for both of his terms.

During the 1990s, Saperstein built a 12-bedroom, 15-bathroom Versailles-style estate called Fleur de Lys with his then-wife, Suzanne, sprawled across several acres on Carolwood Drive in Holmby Hills. The home is listed by Forbes magazine as one of the most expensive in the United States, with an estimated property value of about $125 million. The compound, which according to W Magazine is inspired by France's 17th-century Vaux-le-Vicomte, occupies about 45,000 square feet (4,200 m^{2}) and is called Fleur de Lys ("Lily Flower" in French). The home took eleven years to build and the couple were divorced 18 months after it was completed. His wife Suzanne had the house on the market at a listing price of $125 million shortly after divorcing her husband. He also owns a horse ranch nestled in the hills at the east end of Simi Valley, California, called Hummingbird Nest Ranch. The ranch has a main villa, a period ranch house, four guest houses, and stables for dozens of horses. By 2014, the 126-acre property (51 ha) had become self-contained with housing for staff, a commercial laundry, water wells, diesel generators, a gasoline pump and a large solar panel field.
