= Fleur de Lys (Los Angeles, California) =

Mansion in Los Angeles, California, United States

Coordinates: 34°5.131′N 118°25.675′W

- Interactive map of the Fleur de Lys area

General information
- Type: Private residence
- Location: Holmby Hills, 350 N Carolwood Dr, Los Angeles, California 90077
- Completed: 2002
- Client: David I. Saperstein
- Owner: Unknown

Technical details
- Floor area: 35,046 square feet (3,255.9 m^{2})

Design and construction
- Architect: Richardson Robertson III

Fleur de Lys is a large residence in Holmby Hills, Los Angeles, California.

== Overview ==
Situated on five acres of land in Holmby Hills, the 45,000-square-foot (4,200 m^{2}) property has twelve bedrooms, fifteen baths, a fifty-seat theater, a ballroom, a gym, a pool house, a 1,200-foot (370 m) running track, a tennis court and a guest house. There is a 200-yard (180 m) driveway from the gate to the main house.

The house was commissioned in 1996 and completed in 2002, epitomizing the opulence and grandeur of French architecture inspired by Vaux le Vicomte and Versailles. It was designed by architect Richardson Robertson III of Robertson Partners who ensured that every detail aligned with the aesthetics of grand French chateaux.

Completed in 2002, the 45,000-square-foot mansion was the brainchild of Suzanne and David Saperstein, who sought to create a residence that melded historical elegance with modern luxury. The estate spans five acres and includes a variety of luxurious amenities, such as a spa, a pool with a pavilion, a tennis court, and a garden folly. The landscaping is meticulously designed with flat lawns, ornamental gardens, and mature trees, creating a secluded, countryside ambiance in the heart of Los Angeles. The 600-foot-long driveway enhances the estate's grandeur and privacy, leading to a tree-lined allée and a cobblestone-paved motor court.

Suzanne Saperstein's vision for Fleur de Lys was deeply influenced by her passion for French 18th-century art and architecture. She enlisted Gregory Mauge, a renowned expert in 17th to 19th-century decorative arts, to curate the estate’s extensive collection of antiques and artworks. Mauge's expertise ensured that each piece within the mansion was authentic and historically significant, adding a layer of cultural depth to the estate. His role encompassed authenticity assessment, historical research, appraisal, and private collection curation.

The interior of Fleur de Lys was adorned with museum-quality French antiques. The grand foyer features a massive chandelier and marble columns topped in gold leaf. The main salon, designed to extend the full width of the house, is furnished with rare antiques. The estate also includes a 3,000-square-foot manager's house and staff quarters, accommodating up to ten people.

Lot is 4.19 acres (1.70 ha) between Carolwood and Angelo Drives. Main entrance on Angelo drive. Total floor area is 35,046 square feet (3,255.9 m^{2}).

== Ownership ==
The original owners were David I. Saperstein and his wife Suzanne Saperstein. Upon their divorce in 2004, his wife received the property in the settlement. She put it on the market for US$125,000,000 (£78 million) in 2006. On March 28, 2014, the house reportedly sold to Magnus Aakvaag a Norwegian billionaire, close to the Fjellberg family, for US$102 million in cash, the most expensive property ever sold in Los Angeles County at the time, according to the Los Angeles Times.

== See also ==
- List of largest houses in the Los Angeles Metropolitan Area
- List of largest houses in the United States
