= Rancho San José de Buenos Ayres =

Coordinates: 34.090°N 118.450°W

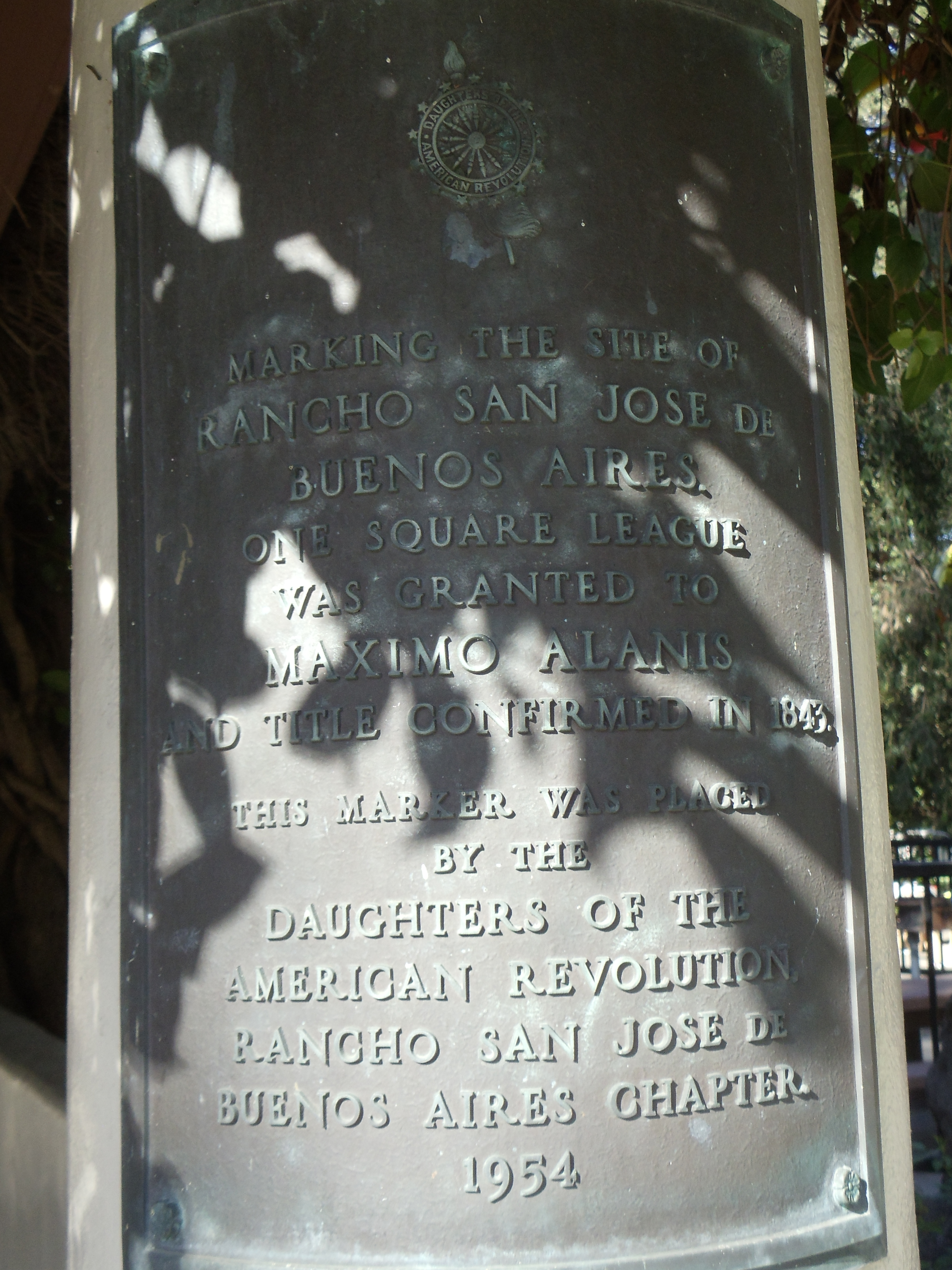
Plaque in Holmby Park, Holmby Hills, Los Angeles, California. It reads, "Marking the site of Rancho San Jose de Buenos Aires. One square league was granted to Maximo Alanis and title confirmed in 1843. This marker was placed by the Daughters of the American Revolution Rancho San Jose de Buenos Aires Chapter. 1954"

Rancho San José de Buenos Ayres was a 4,438-acre (17.96 km^{2}) Mexican land grant in present day Los Angeles County, California given by Governor Micheltorena in 1843 to Maximo Alanis. The area that was given to Alanis now occupies Westwood, UCLA, Holmby Hills, and Bel Air, Los Angeles. The ranch extended from what is now Sepulveda Boulevard to Beverly Hills.

== History ==
Maximo Alanis became the first property owner when he moved to the area in the 1820s. By 1843 the Mexican governor, Manuel Micheltorena (1842–1845) gave Jose Maximo Alanis (in all likelihood this is Alanis' son) a one square league grant of land. Jose Maximo Alanis utilized the land as a ranch until he sold it to Benjamin "Don Benito" Wilson in 1858.

With the cession of California to the United States following the Mexican–American War, the 1848 Treaty of Guadalupe Hidalgo provided that the land grants would be honored. As required by the Land Act of 1851, a claim was filed with the Public Land Commission in 1852, and the grant was patented to Benjamin D. Wilson and W. T. B. Sanford in 1866.

Rancho San Jose de Buenos Ayres was sold to John W. Wolfskill in 1884. In the late 1880s, the Los Angeles and Pacific Railroad (of which Wolfskill was a director) and the Santa Monica Land and Water Company partnered to run a Los Angeles to Santa Monica rail line through the ranch and lay out 800 lots for the prospective town of "Sunset". After the railroad failed, Wolfskill secured a judgment against the railroad and company for payment on the largely-unsold Sunset lands. In February 1891, Wolfskill was awarded $293,000, and the remaining unsold ranch land was returned to him, but it wasn't subsequently worked or utilized for agriculture. When Wolfskill died, the land was left to his heirs. In 1919 the Wolfskill heirs sold the Rancho to Arthur Letts, the founder of the Broadway Department Store chain.

== See also ==
- Ranchos of California
- List of Ranchos of California
