= Janss Investment Company =

California real estate company (1895–1995)

- Industry: real estate development
- Founded: 1895
- Founder: Peter Janss
- Defunct: 1995
- Headquarters: Los Angeles, California
- Key people: Edwin Janss Sr. Harold Janss; Edwin Janss Jr.(Chairman, 1970s); Bill Janss; William Janss Jr. (President, 1980); Todd Janss

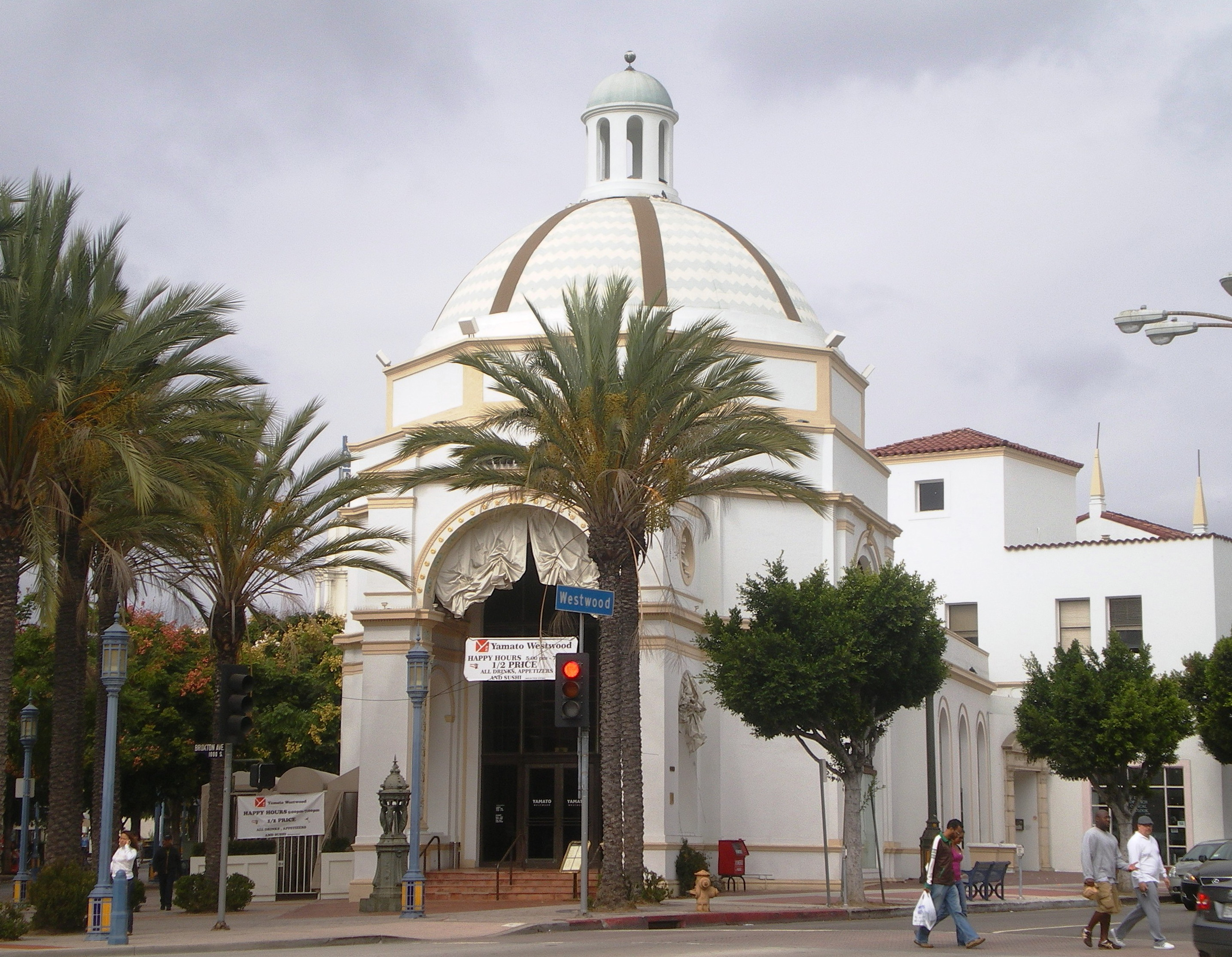
Janss Investment Company Building, Westwood

The Janss Investment Company was a family-run, Los Angeles–based real estate development company that operated from 1895 to 1995.

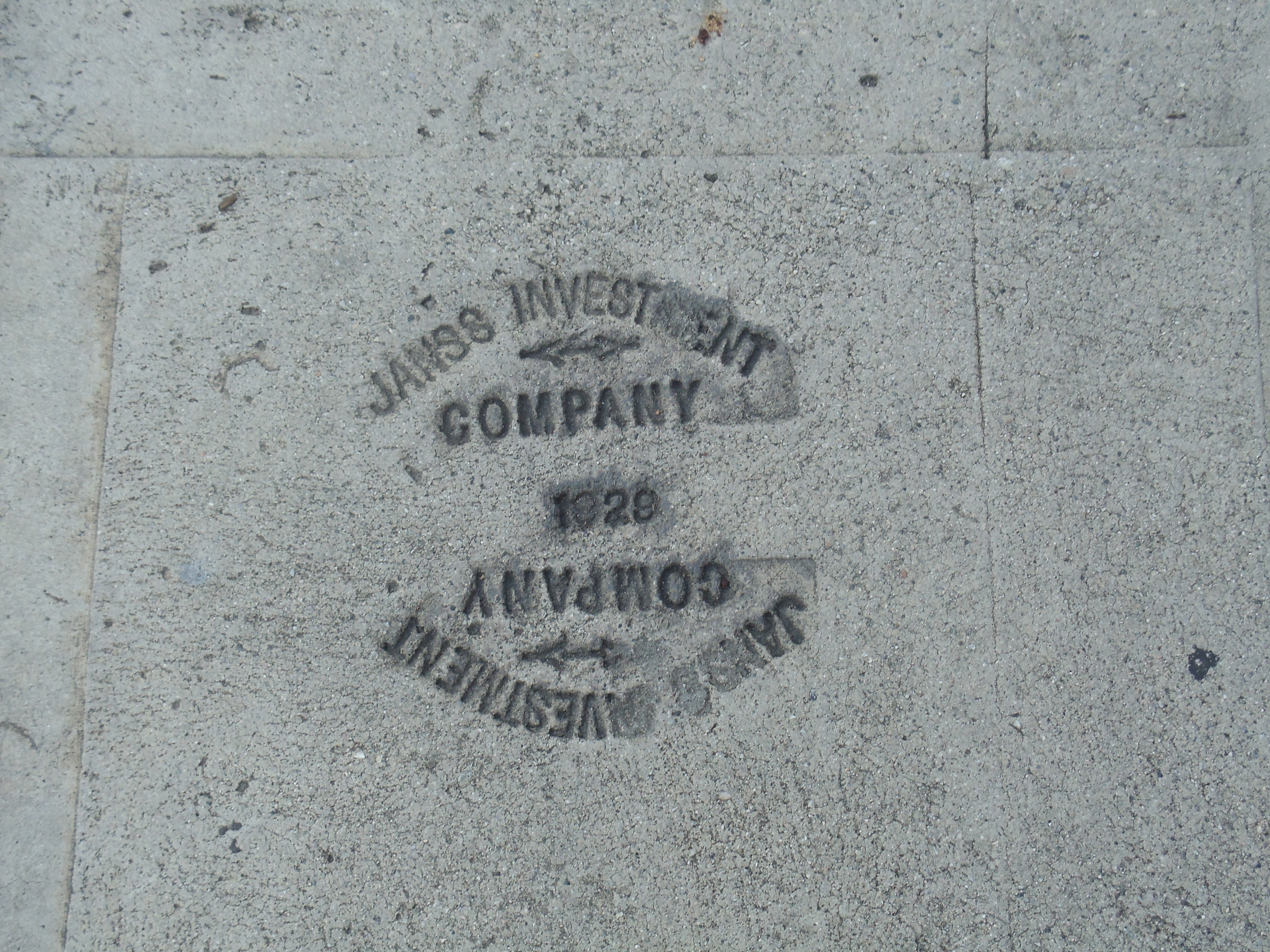
Janss Investment Company, 1929. Sidewalk on Hilgard Avenue in Westwood, Los Angeles, California.

== History ==
=== First generation ===
The Janss Investment Company was founded by Peter Janss, an immigrant doctor from Denmark. Peter Janss graduated in the class of 1877 in Keokuk, Iowa, and by 1882 he was appointed Hall County physician. He moved to Los Angeles in 1893, planning to practice medicine but discovered the real estate industry was much more lucrative.

By 1906 he and his two sons, Edwin Janss Sr. and Harold Janss established an investment company, creating subdivisions in Belvedere Gardens, Boyle Heights, Monterey Park, and Yorba Linda.

Janss developed Ramona Acres in Monterey Park. Janss subdivided Highland Villa and Belvedere Gardens (now known as East Los Angeles) in Boyle Heights.

In 1909, Janss subdivided a 3,500-acre (14 km^{2}) part of the Bernardo Yorba Rancho Cañón de Santa Ana property and named the new town "Yorba Linda".

=== Second generation ===
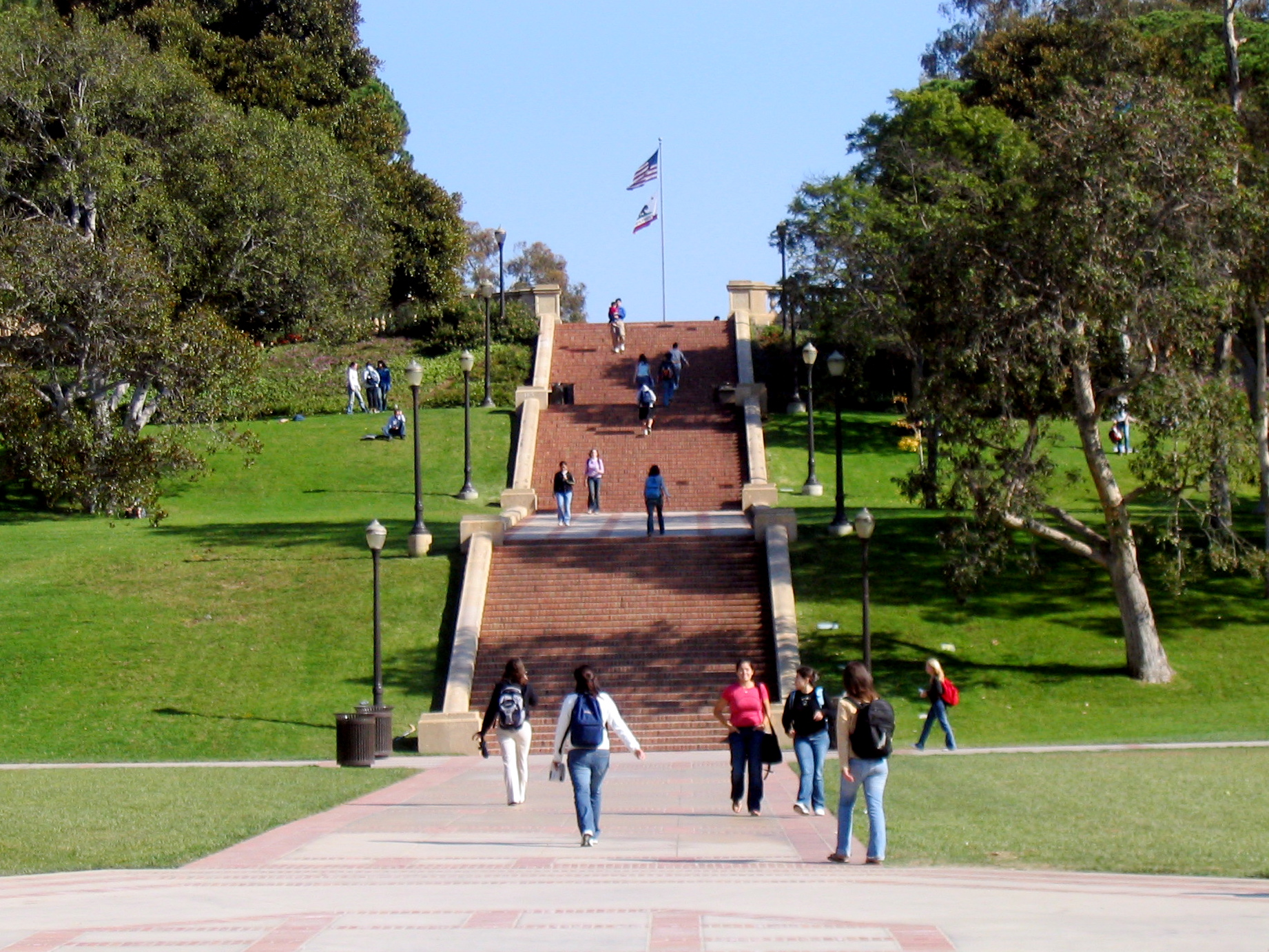
Janss Steps, UCLA

Sons Edwin Janss Sr. and Harold Janss developed Van Nuys and Owensmouth, now called Canoga Park.

In 1911 Harold Janss married Arthur Letts's daughter Gladys. In 1923 after Arthur Letts, Sr., died, they took control of the 3,300-acre (13 km^{2}) John Reid Wolfskill ranch on Rancho San Jose de Buenos Ayres. In a deal to get the University of California, Los Angeles, in 1925 Janss Investment Company sold 375 acres (1.5 km^{2}) to the cities of Los Angeles, Santa Monica, Venice and Beverly Hills at the bargain price of $1.2 million — about a quarter of its value. The cities, whose voters had passed bond issues to pay for the site, turned around and donated it to the state. The UCLA campus's former "Janss Steps" (now renamed to the "Tongva Steps") were named for the two brothers. While the UCLA campus was being built, Janss Investment Company went to work developing the Westwood Village commercial area and surrounding residential neighborhoods. Due to racial covenants included in the deeds of the buildings in Westwood Village, people of color were barred from patronizing businesses in the area.

After Janss sold the land to help build the UCLA campus, many organizations affiliated with university began to form. Many of these groups were fraternities and sororities whose members were mostly white men and women. The land for the university had been sold, but the land surrounding it still belonged to Janss. They sold the land along Hilgard Ave. to twenty one European American groups for the prices between $7,500 and $9,500, whereas the usual asking price was between $8,000 and $12,000.

In 1938 an Asian American sorority, Chi Alpha Delta, wanted to purchase the UCLA Religious Conference building with the hopes of setting up a home for its members and students near campus. The university appeared to be wanting to sell the building for this purpose, but while some of Janss was willing to sell, one was unwilling to sell to "Orientals".

The Janss Brothers' headquarters in Westwood Village, the Janss Investment Company Building or Janss Dome, was opened in 1929. The Dome stands today as one of the iconic buildings of Westwood Village. The firm's Janss Investment Co. "stamps" appear on sidewalks in many Westside residential neighborhoods.

=== Third generation ===
Edwin Janss Jr. was chairman of the Janss Investment Company and the third generation of a family of Los Angeles real-estate developers. He and his brother Bill Janss helped expand or develop two ski resorts — Sun Valley in Idaho and Snowmass (ski area) in Colorado — both of which were sold in the late 1970s. Bill Janss was a member of the never-to-compete 1940 US Ski Team. They developed the suburban community of Thousand Oaks on 10,000-acre (40 km^{2}) of land in the Conejo Valley purchased in 1919.

=== Fourth generation ===
William Janss Jr., M.D., took over the family business and became Janss Corp.'s president in 1980. During his term, the firm developed some $160 million worth of projects. The firm ceased operations in 1995.
