= William Hatton (MP) =

English politician (d.1597)

Member of Parliament for Corfe Castle
- In office 1586–1589 Serving with Francis Hawley
- Preceded by: John Clavell
- Succeeded by: William Tate

Personal details
- Born: c. 1565
- Died: 12 March 1597
- Resting place: All Saints Church, Holdenby
- Spouse: Lady Elizabeth Cecil
- Education: Oxford University

Sir William Hatton (né Newport; c. 1565 - 12 March 1597) was an English politician in the 16th century.

== Sir William Newport ==
William Newport was born c. 1565, son of John Newport of Hunningham, Warwickshire and Dorothy Hatton, sister of Sir Christopher Hatton, Elizabeth I's celebrated Lord Chancellor. Newport attended Magdalen College, Oxford c. 1577 before travelling to Europe, (Note: There is little evidence that he ever completed his studies at Oxford.) spending some time in Paris with Anthony Ashley, transferring to The Netherlands in 1586, where he fought at Zutphen with Sir Philip Sydney, returning to England in the same year to attend Sydney's funeral. Thereafter, Newport appears to have remained in England, when he was twice returned in his uncle's borough of Corfe Castle although his parliamentary career is poorly documented in the journals of the House of Commons. His time in Europe had instilled the adventurer in him, apparently collaborating with his neighbours to hire ships and to harry the Spanish Armada in 1588. (Note: The act of joining the Armada may have earned him the Knighthood, which was conferred on him around this time.)

Sir William Newport married firstly to Elizabeth Gawdy in 1589, the daughter and heiress of Sir Francis Gawdy. Elizabeth died shortly after giving birth to a daughter, Frances Hatton, in 1590, who was raised by her grandfather Francis Gawdy. (Frances later married Robert Rich, 2nd Earl of Warwick, issues include Anne Montagu, Viscountess Mandeville) The following year Newport's maternal uncle Christopher Hatton died, leaving his considerable estates, as well as his mounting debts, to Newport. (Note: Norsworthy reports debts of £42,000 on the Isle of Purbeck alone, but Holdenby Hall is attributed as the main burden of inheritance for William.)

== Sir William Hatton ==
Newport assumed the name and arms of Hatton c. 1590/91, in lieu of his inheritance from his uncle, Sir Christopher Hatton. Properties included two palatial estates in Northampton, (Note: Sir Christopher Hatton built the vast palace of Holdenby Hall, which was completed in 1583 and was possibly the largest house in England at the time. He built it to accommodate Elizabeth I, who never actually stayed there. The house became a Royal Palace of King James I and was demolished in 1651. He also bought Kirby Hall in 1575.) Ely Place in Holborn, (Note: which later became Hatton Garden in commemoration of Sir Christopher Hatton who died there.) and the Isle of Purbeck, which included Corfe Castle, all of which carried debts, creating financial hardship for Hatton, who lacked the revenues of high office enjoyed by his uncle. Hatton was able to sell lands that had not been developed to help pay off some of the debt and was able to play an active role in Northamptonshire county business. Not long after, Newport married "the spirited" Lady Elizabeth Cecil, daughter of the Thomas Cecil, 1st Earl of Exeter, in what was thought to have been a happy, if short, marriage. They had one child together, who died in infancy.

Hatton died at his home in Holborn in 1597, when his wife was still in her teens, and was buried at All Saints Church, Holdenby. Hatton had no male heir and appears to have split his estate between his wife, Lady Elizabeth Hatton, and his second cousin, Sir Christopher Hatton.
