= Ye Olde Mitre =

Listed pub in Holborn, London, England

- The pub in 2016

General information
- Type: Public house
- Location: 1 Ely Court, Ely Place, Holborn, London, England
- Coordinates: 51°31′06″N 0°06′27″W
- Completed: c. 1773; 253 years ago
- Renovated: Early 20th century (remodelled); Late 20th century (extended)
- Owner: Fuller's

Design and construction
- Designations

Listed Building – Grade II
- Official name: Ye Olde Mitre public house
- Designated: 24 October 1951
- Reference no.: 1078281

Website
- yeoldemitreholborn.co.uk

Ye Olde Mitre is a Grade II listed public house on Ely Court in Ely Place, Holborn, London, England. A pub is believed to have occupied the site since 1546, when the Mitre Tavern was established to serve the household staff of the Bishop of Ely's nearby London residence. The present building dates from around 1773 and retains an interior largely remodelled in the early 20th century. Its historic interior is included in the Campaign for Real Ale (CAMRA)'s National Inventory of Historic Pub Interiors, where it is rated three stars for its "outstanding national historic importance".

== History ==
A public house has occupied the site since 1546, when the Mitre Tavern is believed to have been established to serve the household staff of the Bishop of Ely's London residence. Hidden in a narrow passage between Hatton Garden and Ely Place, the pub occupies a site cleared in 1772 following the Crown's acquisition of the surrounding area. The present pub dates from around 1773, with its interior remodelled in the early 20th century and a rear extension added in the late 20th century.

On 24 October 1951, Ye Olde Mitre was designated a Grade II listed building. It was included on the Campaign for Real Ale (CAMRA)'s National Inventory of Historic Pub Interiors before the inventory's grading system was revised. Under the revised scheme, it is rated three stars and its interior is regarded as being "of outstanding national historic importance". The pub was acquired by Fuller's in 2009, which owns the freehold as of July 2026.

== Architecture ==
=== Exterior ===
The building is constructed of stock brick with a roof of Welsh slate and rises to three storeys beneath an attic. The principal elevation has a glazed timber frontage at street level, incorporating a multi-paned central window. This is flanked by former openings, including a blocked entrance on the right with decorative pilasters topped by Corinthian capitals. A dentilled cornice runs above the ground-floor frontage. The upper elevations contain a mixture of traditional sash and casement windows, while two openings on the second floor are blind. The southern section of the side elevation has a timber-framed glazed frontage and entrance. An adjoining two-storey section to the left is distinguished by ground-floor windows with Tudor-style detailing.

=== Interior ===
The bar in 2025

The interior largely reflects a refurbishment carried out around 1930, with extensive timber panelling in a Tudor-inspired style. The two main bars, arranged on either side of a central serving counter, retain much of this period character. The smaller front bar has full-height panelling, a panelled counter and a fireplace with a brick interior and marble surround. The rear bar is similarly panelled to dado height and features a smaller counter, a brick fireplace with a cast-iron and timber surround, carved chairs and an old settle. Natural light enters this room through a skylight. A small adjoining snug, known as 'Ye Closet', has panelled walls and built-in bench seating arranged around a central table.

Other surviving features include an original off-sales hatch near the entrance and a glazed section of the front bar displaying a tree trunk traditionally associated with the historic boundary between the Bishop of Ely's garden and land leased to Sir Christopher Hatton. The narrow staircase has broad horizontal timber panelling, possibly dating from the building's late 18th-century construction. The upstairs room, known as the Bishop's Room, was fitted out for public use around 1990.

== See also ==
- List of pubs in London
