= All Saints Church, Holdenby =

Coordinates: 52.3021°N 0.9867°W

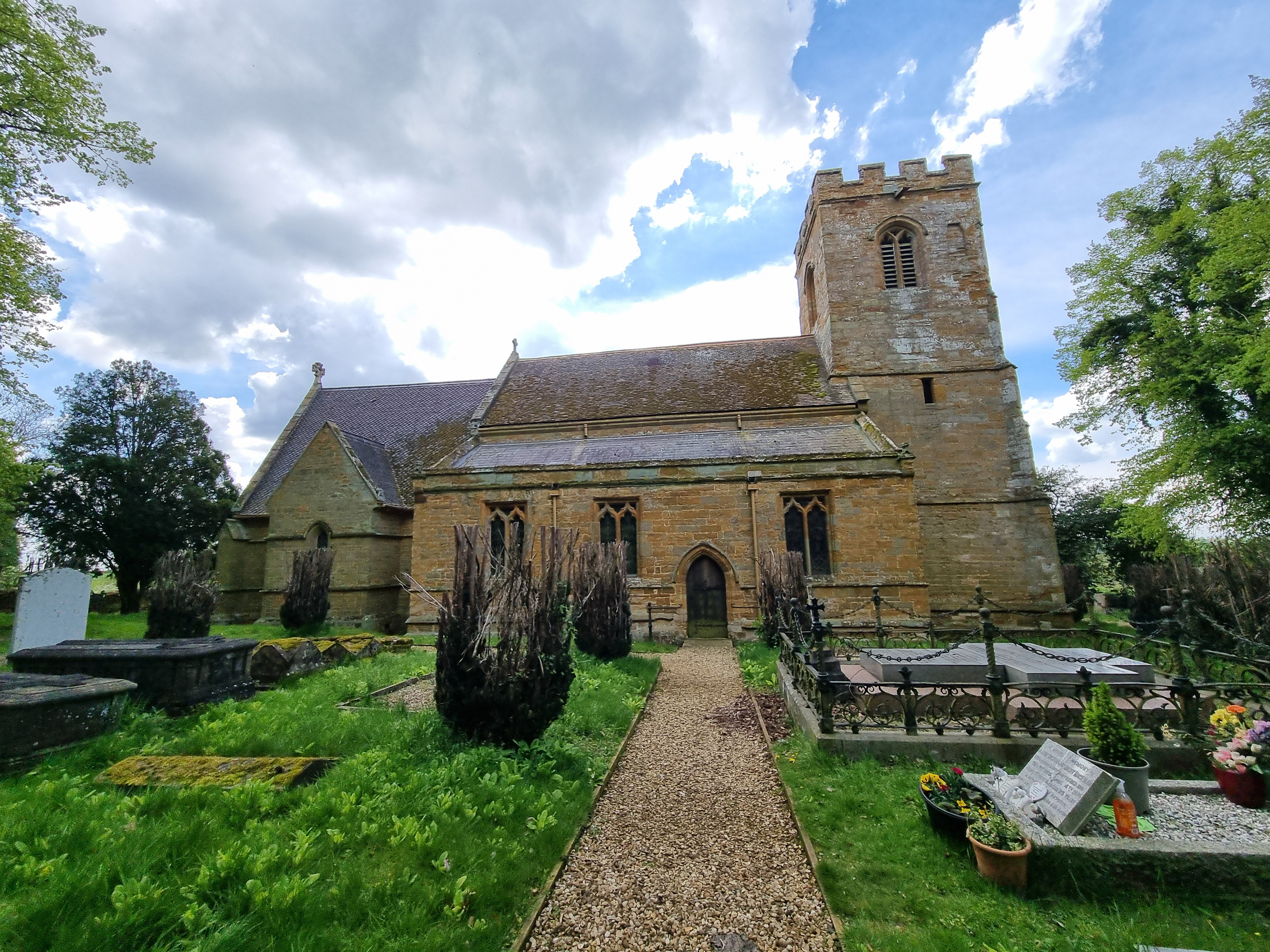
- All Saints Church in 2024

- Location in Northamptonshire
- OS grid reference: SP 691 675
- Location: Holdenby, Northamptonshire
- Country: England
- Denomination: Anglican
- Website: Churches Conservation Trust

History
- Founder: Richard Holdenby
- Dedication: All Saints

Architecture
- Functional status: Redundant
- Heritage designation: Grade II*
- Designated: 2 November 1954
- Architect(s): Sir Henry Dryden (chancel); Sir George Gilbert Scott (restoration)
- Architectural type: Church
- Style: Gothic, Gothic Revival
- Groundbreaking: 1330
- Completed: 1844
- Closed: 1972

Specifications
- Materials: Lias ashlar stone, tiled roofs

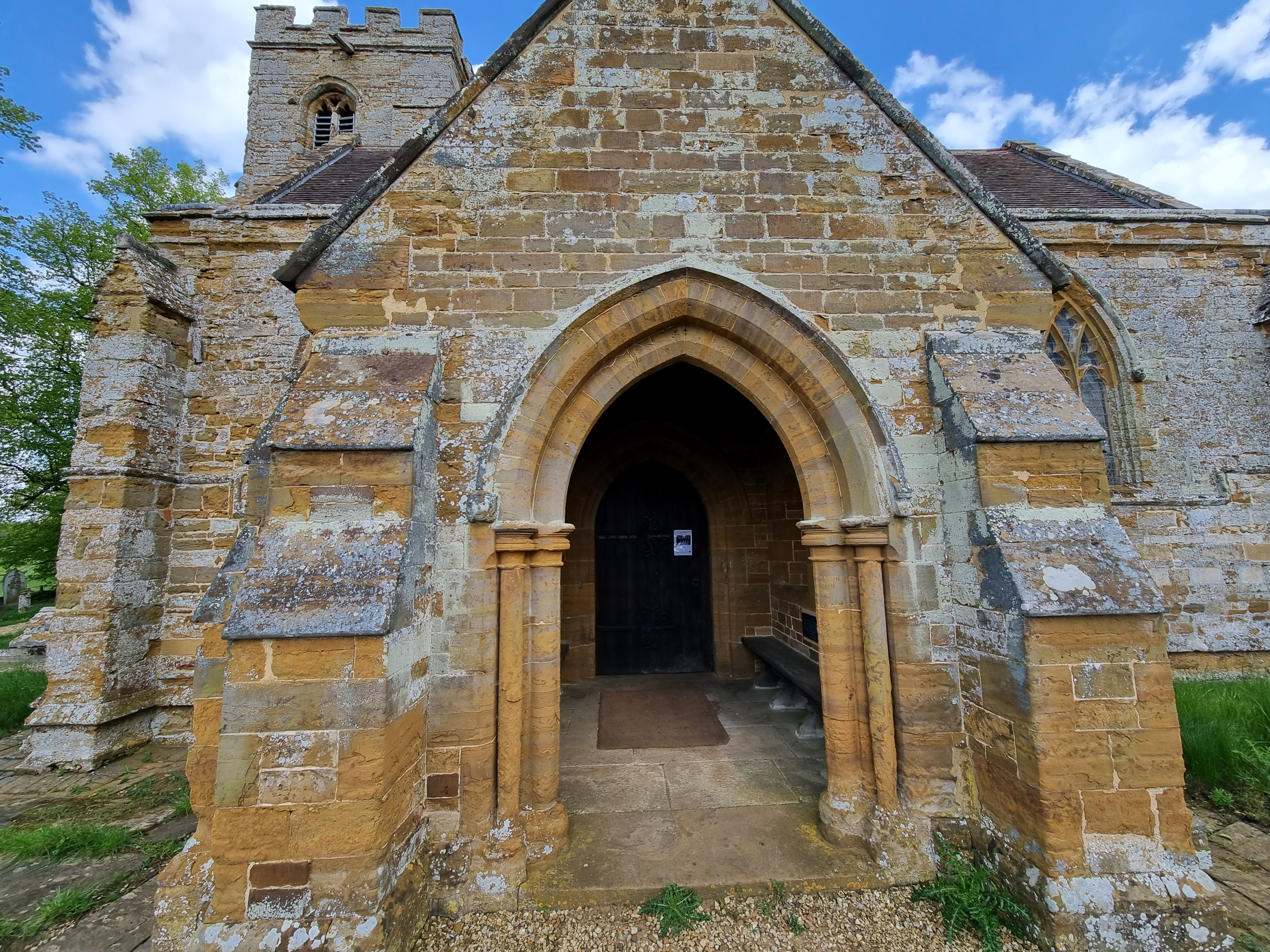
Main entrance

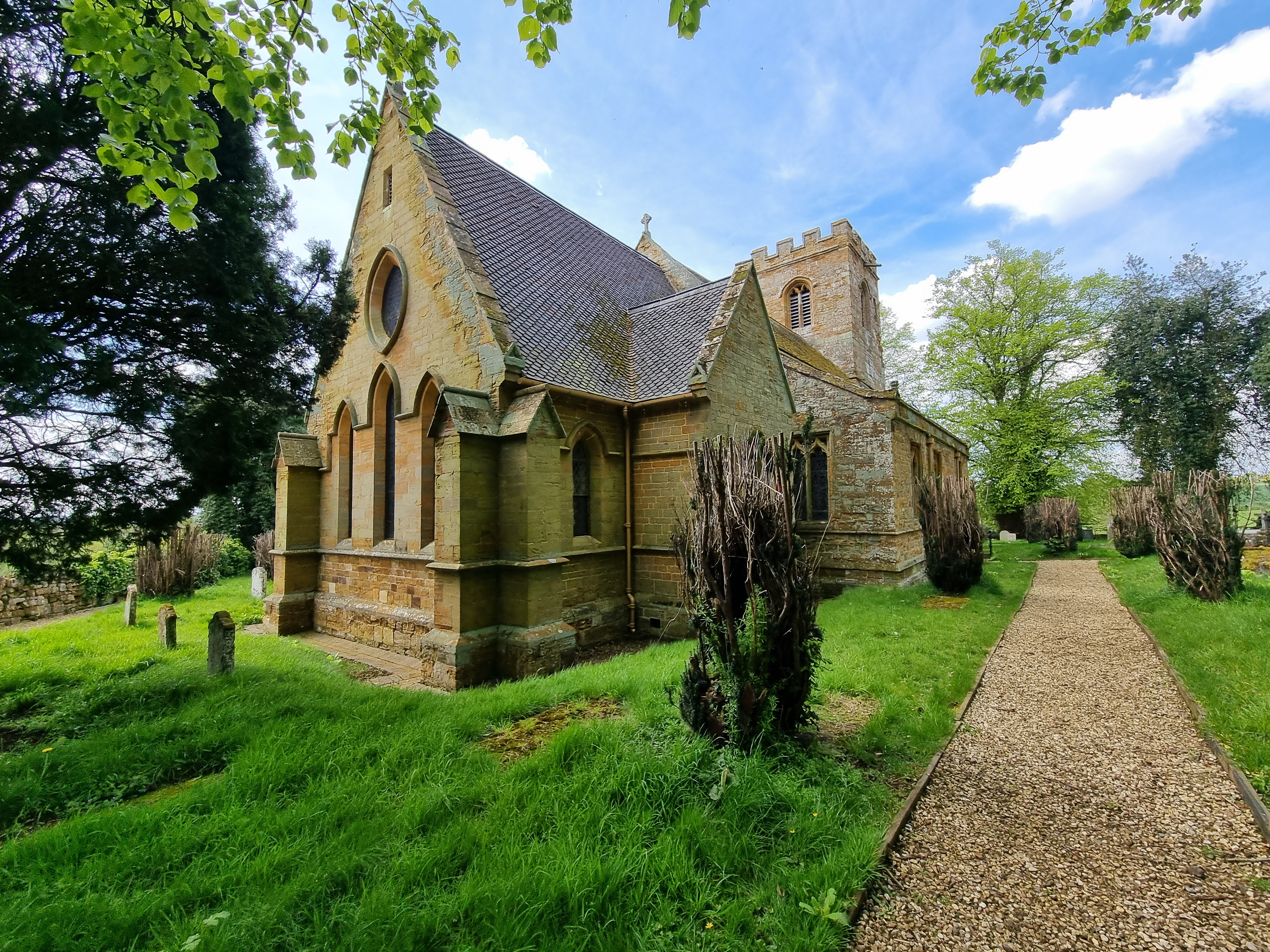

All Saints Church is a redundant Anglican church in the village of Holdenby, Northamptonshire, England. It is recorded in the National Heritage List for England as a designated Grade II* listed building, and is under the care of the Churches Conservation Trust.

== History ==
The present church was largely built between 1330 and 1340 by Richard Holdenby, the lord of the manor. It is not the first church on the site, because the presence of a rector is recorded in 1220, but there are no remains of an earlier church. The nave, the aisles, and the lower part of the tower date from the 14th century. During the 15th century the upper part of the tower was added, and the north aisle was altered and its roof was raised. In the 1570s Sir Christopher Hatton, Lord Chancellor to Elizabeth I, built a new mansion and moved the dwellings of the village away from the vicinity of the church, leaving it isolated. In 1843–44 the chancel was rebuilt to a design by Sir Henry Dryden of Canons Ashby House. The church was restored in 1867–68 by Sir George Gilbert Scott. This included adding new high-pitched roofs to the nave and the south aisle, renewal of the window tracery, the stained glass and the doors, and the addition of the south porch. An organ chamber was added to the chancel in 1874. In 1972, when the parish was united with that of East Haddon, All Saints was declared redundant, and it came under the care of the Redundant Churches Fund (now the Church Conservation Trust).

== Architecture ==
=== Exterior ===
The church is constructed in lias ashlar stone with roofs tiled in a fish-scale pattern. Its plan consists of a nave with north and south aisles, a chancel, and a west tower. The tower is in three stages, with a clasping buttress on the west and an angle buttress at its junction with the nave. In the lowest stage is a two-light west window. The top stage contains two-light bell openings on each side and it has a crenellated parapet. On both the north and south sides of the chancel are lancet windows with buttresses between them, and the east window consists of a triple lancet with a lozenge-shaped window above it. In the south wall of the south aisle there are two three-light windows, and similar windows are in the east and west ends. The porch, which is gabled, stands between the windows on the south side. Along the north side of the north aisle are three two-light windows and a doorway.

=== Interior ===
The nave arcades are in three bays supported by octagonal piers. At the top of each pier is a corbel carved with a human head. In the northeast corner of the south aisle is a tomb recess and a piscina. The rood screen was originally in nearby Holdenby House, and was moved into the church in about 1700. It is elaborately carved with images including lions, exotic plants, and gilded heads and suns. The cross was added to the screen in 1867. The wooden reredos behind the altar was also originally in Holdenby House. The oak pulpit originated in the 18th century but was altered in the Victorian era. The octagonal font originated in the medieval period and was also altered in Victorian times. The church also contains a Victorian wheeled coffin bier, and a wooden alms box. Above the south door hang the Royal arms of George I. The choir stalls in the chancel date from the 15th century and were originally in Lincoln Cathedral. There include misericords carved with a variety of images.

On the walls of the nave and aisles are seven painted panels with strapwork borders. They contain text taken from the Bishops' Bible of 1568, and so are thought to date from the Elizabethan era. Also on the walls are zinc panels from the Victorian period inscribed with the Lord's Prayer, the Ten Commandments and the Creed. The walls of the chancel are decorated with patterns and the images of two angels. In one of the windows in the south aisle are fragments of 14th-century stained glass. The rest of the stained glass is Victorian. At the east end of the south aisle is an alabaster floor memorial to William Holdenby, who died in 1490, and his wife. Also in the church are memorials to other residents of Holdenby House, including Henry Agar-Ellis, 3rd Viscount Clifden, and to members of the White family. The two-manual organ was built in about 1890 by Wordsworth and Maskell of Leeds.

== Burials ==
- William Hatton, member of parliament in the 16th century

== See also ==
- List of churches preserved by the Churches Conservation Trust in the English Midlands
