= Elizabeth Hatton =

English noblewoman (1578–1646)

Elizabeth
- Lady Hatton; Lady Coke
- Born: 1578
- Died: 3 January 1646 (aged 67–68)
- Buried: St Andrew Holborn, England
- Noble family: Cecil
- Spouses: Sir William Hatton; Sir Edward Coke
- Issue: Frances Coke, Viscountess Purbeck; Elizabeth Coke
- Father: Thomas Cecil, 1st Earl of Exeter
- Mother: Dorothy Neville

Elizabeth, Lady Coke (née Cecil; 1578 – 3 January 1646), was an English court office holder. She served as lady-in-waiting to the queen consort of England, Anne of Denmark. She was the daughter of Thomas Cecil, 1st Earl of Exeter, and Dorothy Neville, and the granddaughter of William Cecil, 1st Baron Burghley. She was the wife of Sir William Hatton and later of Sir Edward Coke.

== Early life ==
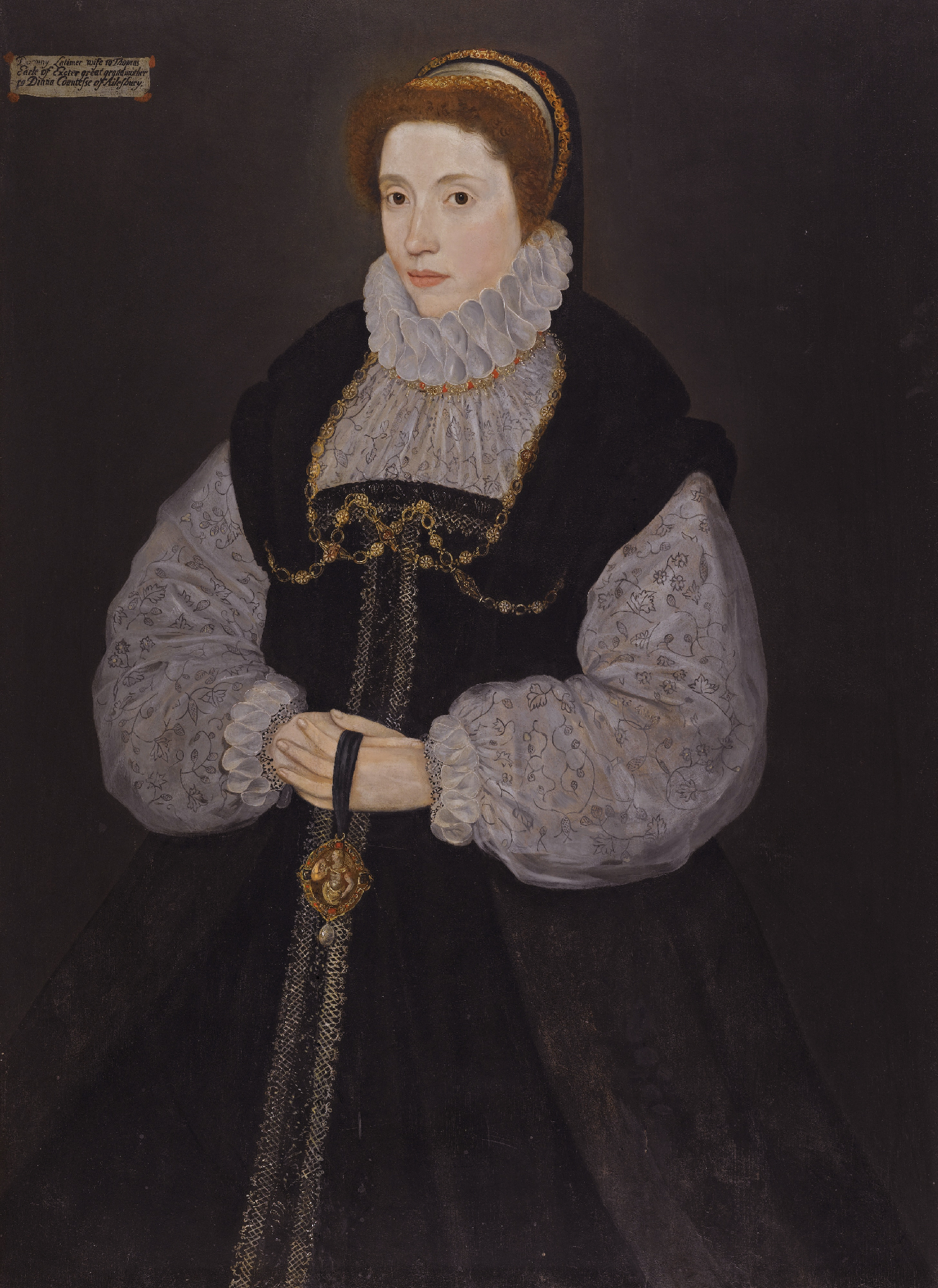
Dorothy Neville, mother of Elizabeth Cecil

Elizabeth Cecil was the daughter of Thomas Cecil, 1st Earl of Exeter and Dorothy Neville (1548–1609). Her maternal grandfather was John Neville, 4th Baron Latimer and her maternal grandmother was Lady Lucy Somerset, daughter of Henry Somerset, 2nd Earl of Worcester and his first wife Margaret Courtenay. Her paternal grandfather was William Cecil, 1st Baron Burghley and her paternal grandmother was Mary Cheke (died February 1543).

== Marriage to William Hatton ==
In the early 1590s, Elizabeth married Sir William Hatton (formerly Newport) (1560–1597), the son of John Newport (d. 1566) of Hunningham, Warwickshire, and his wife, Dorothy Hatton (d. 1566x70), the sister of Elizabeth I's Lord Chancellor, Sir Christopher Hatton. Newport had taken the surname Hatton when his childless uncle, Lord Hatton, settled his estates on him as his heir. When Sir Christopher Hatton died in 1591, Robert Greene dedicated his A Maiden's Dream to 'The right worshipful, bountiful, and virtuous lady, the Lady Elizabeth Hatton, wife to the right worshipful Sir William Hatton, Knight'.

In June 1589, William Hatton had earlier married Elizabeth Gawdy — the daughter and heiress of Sir Francis Gawdy (died 1605) and Elizabeth Coningsby — who died soon after the marriage, leaving an only daughter, Frances Hatton (1590–1623). On 24 February 1605, Frances married Robert Rich, 2nd Earl of Warwick, causing her grandfather Sir Francis to break off relations with her.

== Marriage to Edward Coke ==
After the death of William Hatton on 12 March 1597, and after a failed wooing by Sir Francis Bacon, Elizabeth married Sir Edward Coke on 6 November 1598. Contrary to ecclesiastical law, which stated that marriage was to be conducted at a church between 8 a.m. and 12 noon, their marriage was conducted outside those hours and at a private house. Subsequently, all involved parties to the marriage were prosecuted for breaching ecclesiastical law, and Sir Edward had to sue for a royal pardon.

Elizabeth was twenty-six years younger than Coke and had a disposition that was hot tempered and articulate. They were said to be not compatible but at least well matched. By 1604, Elizabeth's marriage to Sir Edward Coke had deteriorated, and she was said to have become a formidable character and thorn at her husband's side. They quarrelled over their respective rights to the Hatton estate Elizabeth had inherited from her first husband. It was said the Spanish ambassador Gondomar told King James that she refused Coke access to Hatton House (Ely Place) in Holborn. The dispute became so bitter that the king intervened personally to mediate. Elizabeth and her husband were never reconciled: he died in 1634. At his funeral she remarked, "We shall never see his like again, thanks be to God". In 1639, Elizabeth sued her stepson, Sir Robert Coke for breach of her marriage agreement with regard to her property holdings.

== Courtier of Anne of Denmark ==
When James VI of Scotland set out to claim the English throne after the death of Queen Elizabeth I in 1603, the Cokes immediately began ingratiating themselves with the new monarch and his family. Elizabeth travelled to Scotland to meet the incoming Queen, Anne of Denmark, and it was said that the high-tempered beauty managed to please the withdrawn, strong-willed Queen. Hence, she and her husband were able to hold the affection and trust of the Queen as long as she lived. She petitioned Sir Robert Cecil unsuccessfully for the position of keeper of the queen's jewels and to help dress her.

Lady Hatton was invited to perform in some of the queen's masques, including The Vision of the Twelve Goddesses at Hampton Court in January 1604, and The Masque of Beauty at Whitehall Palace in January 1608. On 20 August 1613, Anne of Denmark was received at Wells, Somerset. The mayor William Bull hosted a dinner for members of her household including Lady Hatton, Lady Walsingham, and the four maids of honour.

After the death of Anne of Denmark in 1619, Hatton remained in court circles. On 3 August 1621, in the masque The Gypsies Metamorphosed, actors recited her and her daughter's fortunes in verse. In June 1623 she and her daughter Lady Purbeck travelled to The Hague to see Elizabeth Stuart, Queen of Bohemia, with Elizabeth, Lady Knollys, Isabella Smythe, and Philadelphia Carey. The group sent a comic letter to Dudley Carleton, in the spirit of a masque, explaining their arrival deposited on the shore by Neptune, in hope of an introduction to the King and Queen of Bohemia.

== Family ==
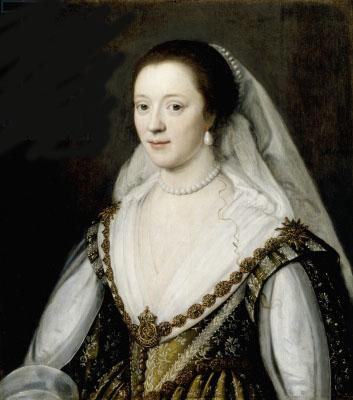
Elizabeth's daughter Frances, Lady Purbeck

Elizabeth had two daughters by her second husband: Frances Coke, Viscountess Purbeck, and Elizabeth Coke, who died unmarried. Frances Coke was married in 1617 to John Villiers, 1st Viscount Purbeck, the elder brother of King James' favourite, George Villiers, 1st Duke of Buckingham. This was a major cause of marital strife between Elizabeth and her second husband, Edward Coke. Elizabeth opposed the match (presumably because Villiers was generally believed to be insane) and sent her daughter Frances away from Hatton House in Holborn without informing her husband. Her plans were to keep Frances in a rented house with the help of her relatives. Elizabeth placed her daughter with Lady Withipole, daughter of Sir William Cornwallis, where she intended her daughter to be betrothed to Henry de Vere, 18th Earl of Oxford. However, her husband later located their daughter by chance and took her away, keeping her locked up by legal means in various houses of his friends. Then in September 1617, Frances was married at Hampton Court in the presence of the King and Queen to John Villiers. The marriage was a disastrous failure, and, in 1621, Frances eloped with Sir Robert Howard, with whom she lived in an unofficial union for many years.

== Death and burial ==
Hatton died on 3 January 1646, and was buried in the parish church of St Andrew Holborn.

== Legacy ==
Hatton left two sums of £100 in her will to be used to buy land in the Parish of Stoke Poges in Buckinghamshire, England. The monies generated are to be used for the poor, sickly and impotent in the Parish. It forms part of the Stoke Poges United Charity. In 2023 a new housing development road called Lady Hatton Place in Stoke Poges was named after her.

=== Portrayals in media ===
English actress Nicola Walker played Hatton in the 2024 Sky Atlantic historical drama series Mary & George. In the series, Hatton is a chief adversary of Mary Villiers, played by Julianne Moore. A review of the show for ABC News noted that "Walker and Moore singe the screen with wit and wickedness. I couldn't have liked and hated them more."

== See also ==
- Hatton Garden

== Additional sources ==
- Aughterson, Kate (2004). "Hatton, Elizabeth, Lady Hatton [née Lady Elizabeth Cecil] (1578–1646)". Oxford Dictionary of National Biography (online ed.). Oxford University Press. doi:10.1093/ref:odnb/68059. (Subscription, Wikipedia Library access or UK public library membership required.)
- Boyer, Allen D. (2004). "Coke, Sir Edward (1552–1634)". Oxford Dictionary of National Biography (online ed.). Oxford University Press. doi:10.1093/ref:odnb/5826. (Subscription, Wikipedia Library access or UK public library membership required.)
- Collier, J. Payne (1865). A Bibliographical and Critical Account of the Rarest Books in the English Language. Vol. I. London: Joseph Lilly. pp. 328–31.
- Gibbs, Philip (1908). The Romance of George Villiers, First Duke of Buckingham. London: Methuen & Co. pp. 59–67.
- Gowdy, Mahlon M. (1919). A Family History Comprising the Surnames of . . . Gawdy ... and the Variant Forms. Lewiston, Maine: Journal Press. pp. 39–1.
- Ibbetson, David (2004). "Gawdy, Sir Francis (d. 1605)". Oxford Dictionary of National Biography (online ed.). Oxford University Press. doi:10.1093/ref:odnb/10467. (Subscription, Wikipedia Library access or UK public library membership required.)
- Kelsey, Sean (2004). "Rich, Robert, second earl of Warwick (1587–1658)". Oxford Dictionary of National Biography (online ed.). Oxford University Press. doi:10.1093/ref:odnb/23494. (Subscription, Wikipedia Library access or UK public library membership required.)
- Longueville, Thomas (1909). The Curious Case of Lady Purbeck; A Scandal of the XVIIth Century. London: Longmans, Green and Co. p. 4.
- MacCaffrey, Wallace T. (2004). "Hatton, Sir Christopher (c.1540-1591)". Oxford Dictionary of National Biography (online ed.). Oxford University Press. doi:10.1093/ref:odnb/12605. (Subscription, Wikipedia Library access or UK public library membership required.)
- McKeen, David (1986). A Memory of Honour; The Life of William Brooke, Lord Cobham. Vol. 2. Salzburg, Austria: University of Salzburg.
- Milward, Richard (2004). "Cecil, Thomas, first earl of Exeter (1542–1623)". Oxford Dictionary of National Biography (online ed.). Oxford University Press. doi:10.1093/ref:odnb/4981. (Subscription, Wikipedia Library access or UK public library membership required.)
- Nicolas, Harris (1847). Memoirs of the Life and Times of Sir Christopher Hatton. London: Richard Bentley.
- Watt, Francis (1915). "Lord Coke as a Person". Juridical Review. 27 (1): 250–266. ISSN 0022-6785.
