= Bleeding Heart Yard =

Courtyard in London

Coordinates: 51.51929°N 0.10697°W

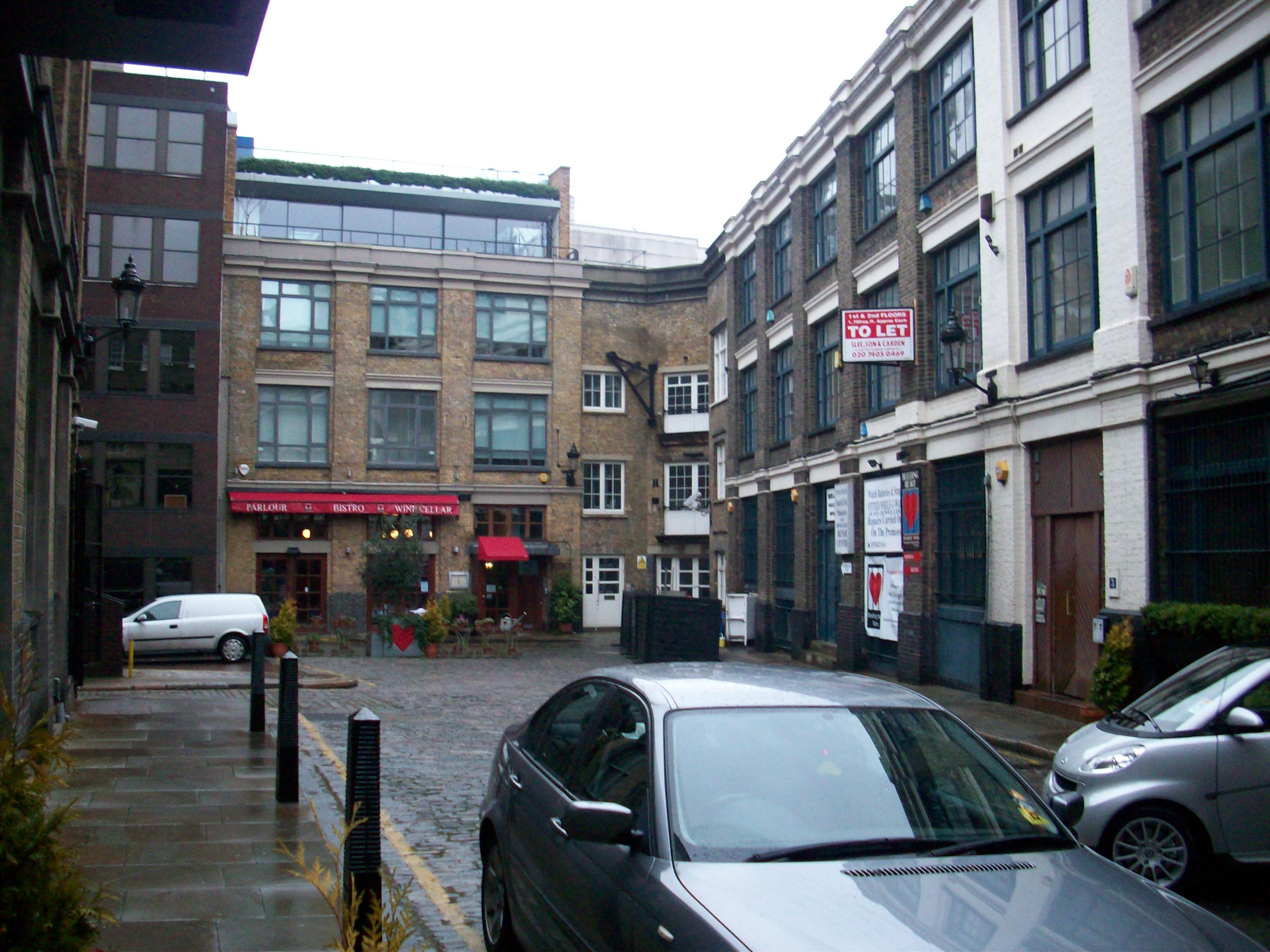
Bleeding Heart Yard pictured in 2010

Bleeding Heart Yard is a cobbled courtyard off Greville Street in the Holborn area of the London Borough of Camden. The courtyard is probably named after a 16th-century inn sign dating back to the Reformation that was displayed on a pub called the Bleeding Heart in nearby Charles Street. The inn sign showed the heart of the Virgin Mary pierced by five swords.

Urban legend has it that the courtyard's name commemorates the murder of Lady Elizabeth Hatton, the second wife of Sir William Hatton, whose family formerly owned the area around Hatton Garden. It is said that her body was found here on 27 January 1646, "torn limb from limb, but with her heart still pumping blood." Elizabeth Hatton did own a house in this vicinity, known as "Ely Place", but she died of natural causes.

== In literature ==
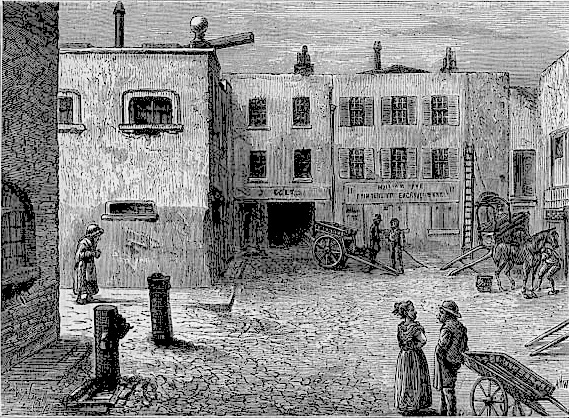
An image of Bleeding Heart Yard from Walter Thornbury's Old and New London, 1873–1888

Bleeding Heart Yard features in the 1857 Charles Dickens novel Little Dorrit as the home of the Plornish family. Dickens wrote of it:

[It was] a place much changed in feature and in fortune, yet with some relish of ancient greatness about it. Two or three mighty stacks of chimneys, and a few large dark rooms which had escaped being walled and subdivided out of the recognition of their old proportions, gave the Yard a character. It was inhabited by poor people, who set up their rest among its faded glories, as Arabs of the desert pitch their tents among the fallen stones of the Pyramids; but there was a family sentimental feeling prevalent in the Yard, that it had a character.

Of poor Lady Hatton, it's needless to say,

No traces have ever been found to this day,
Or the terrible dancer who whisk'd her away;
But out in the court-yard — and just in that part

Where the pump stands — lay bleeding a LARGE HUMAN HEART!
—The Ingoldsby Legends.

Before Dickens, the courtyard was best known for its appearance in R. H. Barham's The Ingoldsby Legends, a collection of poems and stories first published in Bentley's Miscellany beginning in 1837. In one of the stories, The House-Warming: A Legend Of Bleeding-Heart Yard, Lady Hatton, wife of Sir Christopher Hatton, makes a pact with the devil to secure wealth, position, and a mansion in Holborn. During the housewarming of the mansion, the devil dances with her, then tears out her heart, which is found, still beating, in the courtyard the next morning. It is from this legend, together with a case of mistaken identity, that the myth of Lady Elizabeth Hatton's murder — wife, not of Christopher, but of William Hatton — was born.

Bleeding Heart Square by Andrew Taylor was published by Michael Joseph 2008 and by Penguin Books 2009. A gothic thriller and crime novel combined, "Bleeding Heart Square" is set in the 1930s in and around Bleeding Heart Yard and the adjacent Ely Place. Many of the street names in the area, e.g. Holborn Circus, Farringdon Road and Hatton Garden remain unchanged, but many have been altered, in keeping with a long and respected tradition among novelists.

Bleeding Heart Yard is mentioned (as "Bleeding-Heart-Yard") in Stephen Vincent Benét's poem "American Names", as one of a list of Old World places whose names are compared, unfavourably, with the place names of America.

Bleeding Heart Yard is the title of a 2022 crime novel by Elly Griffiths, the third in the Detective Harbinder Kaur series. The yard is the location of one of the main happenings in the plot.

== The yard today ==
A French restaurant, bistro and tavern called The Bleeding Heart now occupies a number of the buildings in the courtyard. A gate at the south of the yard leads to Ely Place.

Greville Street links Bleeding Heart Yard to another notable street from Charles Dickens' novels: Saffron Hill, which was the home of Fagin in Oliver Twist.
