= William Hatton =

William Hatton may refer to:

- William Hatton (pioneer) (1849–1894), Irish immigrant to the United States, early Carmel Valley, California, pioneer
- William H. Hatton (1856–1937), American lumberman and politician
- William Hatton (MP) (1565–1594), English politician
