= Arthur Letts =

American businessman (1862–1923)

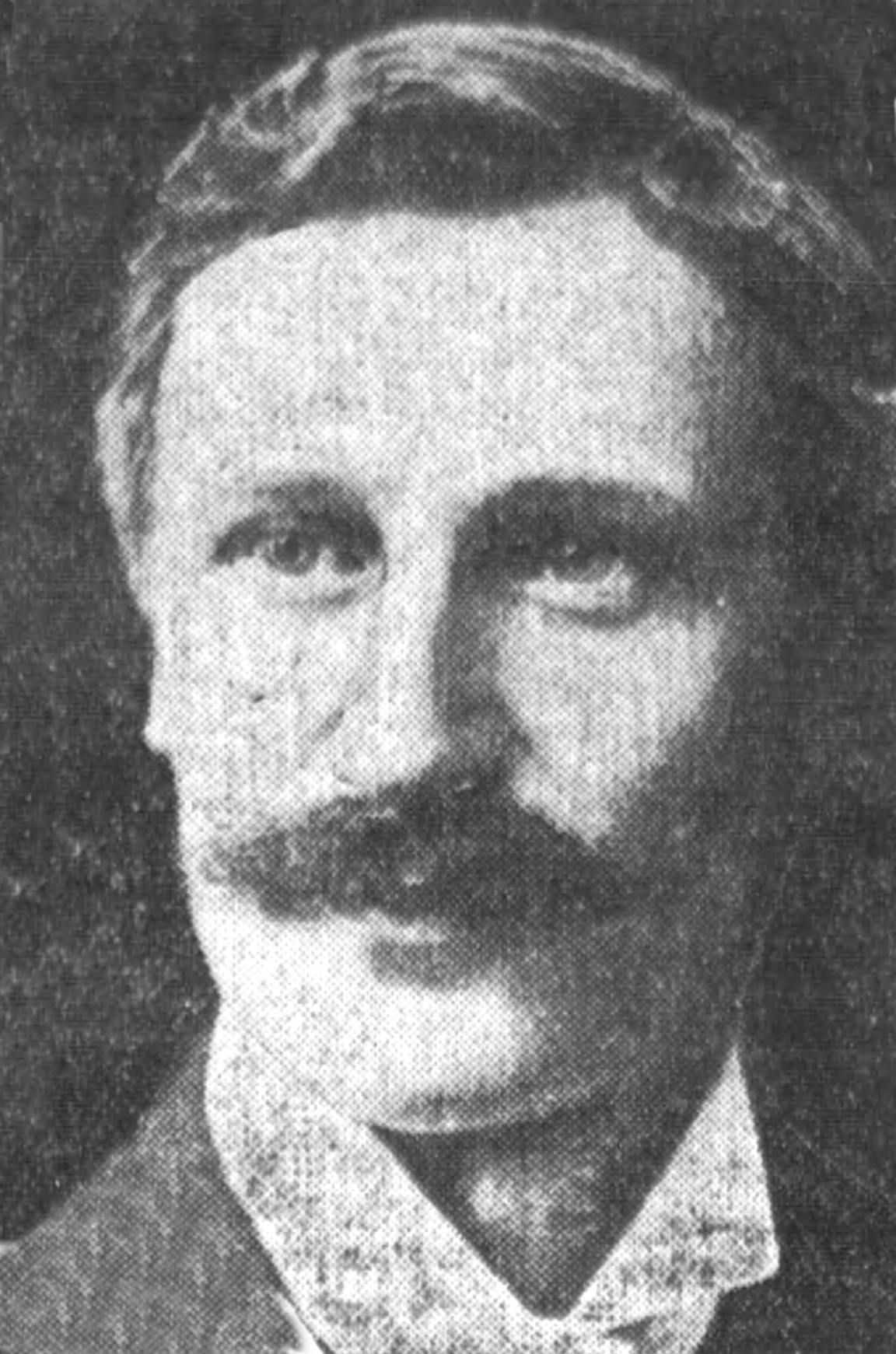
- Arthur Letts Sr. about 1907
- Born: June 17, 1862; Holdenby, Northamptonshire, England
- Died: May 18, 1923 (aged 60); Los Angeles, California, US
- Spouse: Florence Philp
- Children: Florence Edna, Gladys (Janss) and Arthur Letts Jr.

Arthur Letts Sr. (June 17, 1862 – May 18, 1923) was an immigrant from England who made his fortune in Los Angeles, California, in the early years of the 20th century. He built his wealth by transforming a small, bankrupt dry goods store in Downtown Los Angeles into the prominent The Broadway department store, later adding the Bullock's store.

== Early years ==
Arthur Letts Sr. was born in Holdenby, Northamptonshire, England. In 1882 he emigrated to Toronto, Ontario, Canada, and found employment in a large dry goods store. When the Red River Rebellion broke out in the Northwest of Canada, he volunteered. He was awarded a silver medal and clasp for distinguished service, and a grant of land by the Canadian government. In the early 1890s, he emigrated to the United States in Seattle, Washington, and began retail employment in dry goods.

== Los Angeles ==
=== The Broadway ===
Letts arrived in the Los Angeles, California, area in 1896. At the corner of Fourth and Broadway, then on the far southern edge of the downtown Los Angeles business district, the J. A. Williams & Co. Dry Goods Store had gone bankrupt. With the help of an influential friend, who was impressed with Letts' knowledge of that type of business, a loan of $5,000 ($193,500 in 2025) was secured from the Los Angeles National Bank, and opened his business on February 24, 1896. He named the department store The Broadway and would go on to greatly expand this location and open up numerous others throughout the southwest United States.

=== Bullock's Department Store ===
Arthur Letts was the 'behind the scenes' financial founder and owner of Bullock's department store, and put John Bullock from his The Broadway to direct this store. After Letts' death, Bullock and a group of investors purchased the store from the estate.

=== Westwood, UCLA, and, Holmby Hills ===
The development of Westwood, Holmby Hills, and UCLA began in 1919 when Arthur Letts Sr. purchased a 400 acres (1.6 km^{2}) portion of the Wolfskill Ranch, originally the Mexican land grant Rancho San Jose de Buenos Ayres. His master plan for the prime land he had purchased in western Los Angeles. was to create a mixed development of retail, apartments, residences, estates, and significant university. He personally christened the developments Westwood and "Holmby Hills," the latter loosely derived from the name of his birthplace, a small village in England called Holdenby. Arthur Letts Sr. died suddenly in 1923, before he could realize his vision.

=== Community ===
Letts joined a number of organizations. He was a member of the Hollywood Masonic Lodge, the Knights Templar, the prestigious California Club in Downtown Los Angeles, the Los Angeles Athletic Club, the elite Los Angeles Country Club, and the Midwick Country Club in Alhambra in the San Gabriel Valley. He was also a member of the exclusive Bohemian Club in San Francisco. He was involved with the Los Angeles Chamber of Commerce, the Realty Board, the Hollywood Board of Trade, the Federation Club, and the Automobile Club of Southern California. Letts was vice-president of the Boy Scouts of America, and leader of his local troop.

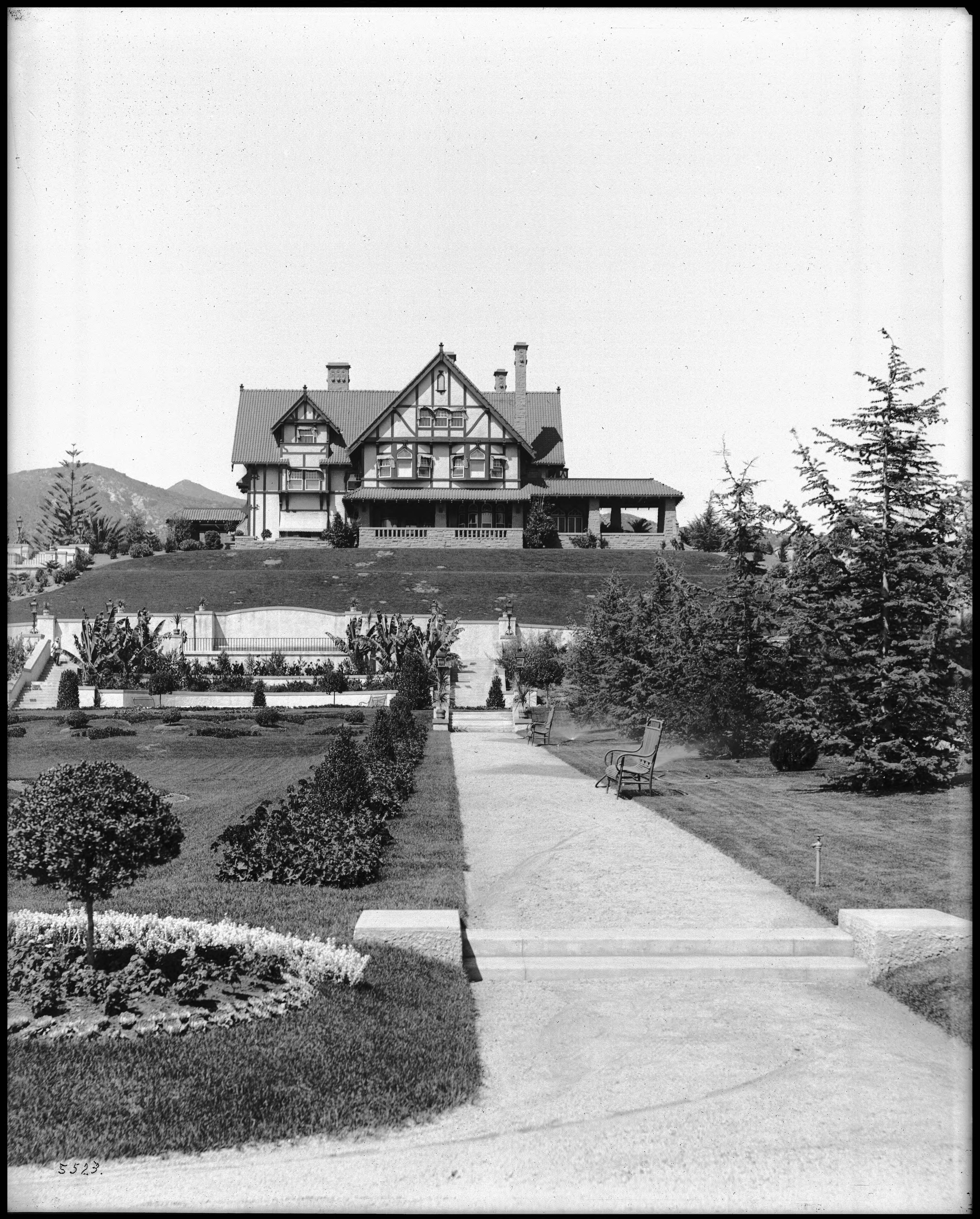
Holmby House and gardens, Los Feliz district (c. 1905)

== Family ==
=== Marriage and home ===
Letts married Florence Philp on August 25, 1886, in Toronto, Ontario, Canada. They had three children; Florence Edna (McNaghten), Gladys (Janss), and Arthur Letts Jr.

Arthur Letts was a skilled horticulturist and avid plant collector. The grounds of his Los Feliz district, Hollywood estate Holmby House were formally laid out with wide variety of trees, shrubs, and flowers, and his cactus collection was known across the country. It was bound by Franklin Avenue, Vermont Avenue, Los Feliz Boulevard, and Laughlin Park. The gardens were open to the public for tours, with the Pacific Electric Railway stopping at it. It was his wish that the gardens be continued even after his death. Upon his death in May 1923, his wife, at the suggestion of son-in-law Harold Janss of Janss Investment Company (who lived at the back of the property), demolished the gardens and mansion in 1927 to subdivide and develop the land, and moved to a new residence in Holmby Hills. She had remarried by June, 1924 to Charles Quinn. Henry E. Huntington purchased many of the rare specimen cacti for his Huntington Desert Garden at his estate and Huntington Library in San Marino

=== Arthur Letts Jr. ===
In 1927, Arthur Letts Jr. built a Tudor-style home at Charing Cross Road on the Los Angeles Country Club. He and Harold Janss took over the Westwood project after his father's death in 1923. His estate became Hugh Hefner's Playboy Mansion before being sold in 2016 for $100 million (~$128 million in 2024) to the son of the owner of Hostess Brands.

=== Harold Janss ===
In 1911, Arthur Letts Sr.'s daughter Gladys married Harold Janss connecting the two families. The Janss Investment Company continued developing planned communities across greater Los Angeles into the 1960s.
