= Holdenby =

Village in Northamptonshire, England

Coordinates: 52.301°N 0.982°W

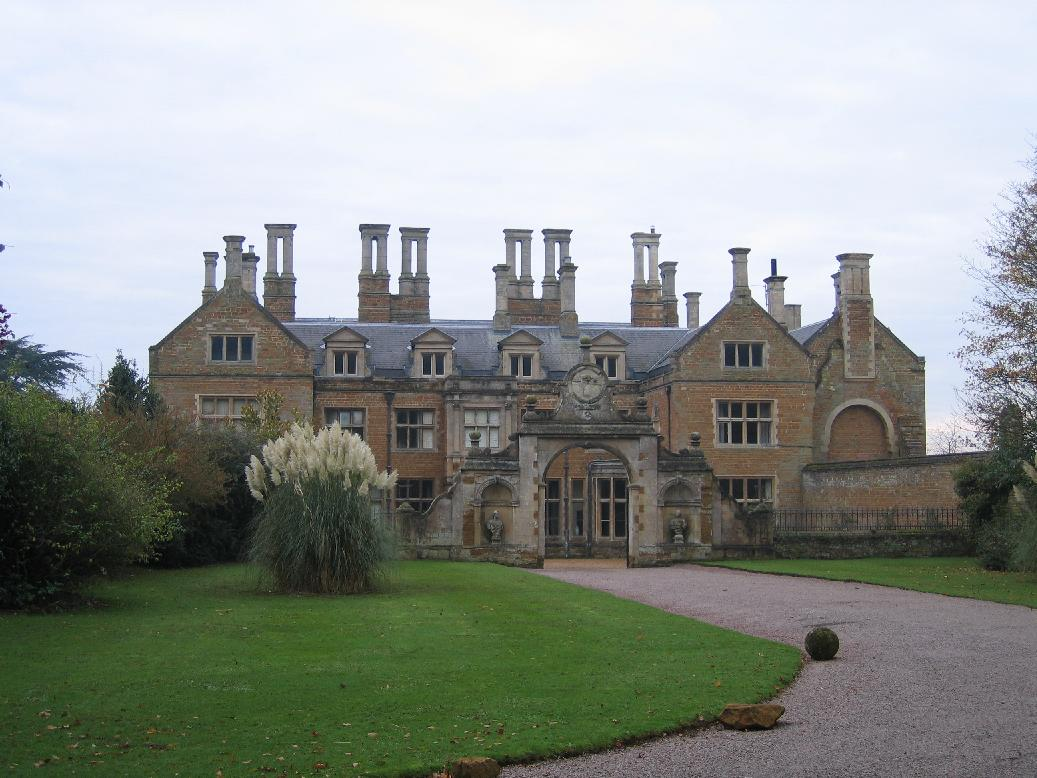
- Holdenby House

- Location within Northamptonshire
- Population: 100 (2001 Census); 170. (2011 Census)
- OS grid reference: SP6967
- Unitary authority: West Northamptonshire
- Ceremonial county: Northamptonshire
- Region: East Midlands
- Country: England
- Sovereign state: United Kingdom
- Post town: Northampton
- Postcode district: NN6
- Dialling code: 01604
- Police: Northamptonshire
- Fire: Northamptonshire
- Ambulance: East Midlands
- UK Parliament: Daventry

Holdenby is an English village and civil parish about 5.5 miles (8.9 km) north-west of Northampton in West Northamptonshire. The parish population measured by the 2011 census was 170. The village name means "Halfdan's/Haldan's farm/settlement".

== Prominent buildings ==
The Church of England parish church of All Saints dates from the 14th century. However, it was extensively remodelled in 1843 and 1868.

Holdenby House has associations with Sir Christopher Hatton, King James I, his son King Charles I and the Marlborough family. It is Holdenby's principal building.

== Namesake ==
The affluent neighbourhood of Holmby Hills, Los Angeles was named after Holdenby by the millionaire Arthur Letts Sr., after the place of his birth.

== Notable people ==
- John Charles Cox, Rector of Holdenby from 1893, was a prominent local historian.
- Arthur Letts Sr., business owner of Los Angeles, California

== See also ==
- Holdenby House
