= Frances Coke, Viscountess Purbeck =

English noblewoman (1602–1645)

Frances Coke
- Viscountess Purbeck
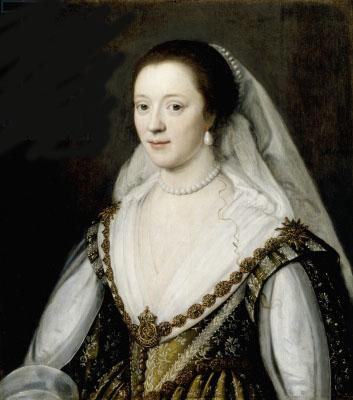
- Portrait of Frances Coke, Viscountess Purbeck, by Michiel Jansz. van Mierevelt (1623)
- Born: 1602; London
- Died: 4 June 1645 (aged 42–43)
- Buried: University Church of St Mary the Virgin, England
- Noble family: Coke
- Spouse: John Villiers, Viscount Purbeck
- Father: Edward Coke
- Mother: Elizabeth Hatton

Frances Coke, Viscountess Purbeck (August 1602 – 4 June 1645), was the sister-in-law of George Villiers, 1st Duke of Buckingham, and the central figure in a notable sex scandal within the English aristocracy of the early 17th century that was known at the time as "the Lady Purbeck’s business".

== Early life ==
Frances was the younger daughter of the judge and privy councillor Edward Coke and his second wife Lady Elizabeth Hatton. She was born at Hatton House in London, and baptised on 2 September 1602 in the parish church of St Andrew Holborn.

== Forced marriage ==
In 1617, her father betrothed Frances (at age fifteen) to John Villiers, Viscount Purbeck, the elder brother of George Villiers, 1st Duke of Buckingham, the favourite of King James VI and I. The match was an apparent bid by Edward Coke to win back royal favour, following his dismissal as Lord Chief Justice and from the Privy Council.

Both Frances and her mother opposed the marriage. Lady Hatton sent Frances away from Hatton House on 10 July, without informing her father. Lady Hatton's plans involved a rented house and her extended family of cousins. She placed her daughter first with Lady Withipole; she was the former Frances Cornwallis, daughter of William Cornwallis of Brome. The next step would be a pre-emptive betrothal to Henry de Vere, 18th Earl of Oxford.

Edward Coke discovered his daughter Frances, by chance, at a house near Oatlands, rented by Edmond Withipole from the Earl of Argyll, and took her away. By legal means he had her kept at the house of Henry Yelverton, the Attorney-General; and then at the house of Thomas Knyvet, 1st Baron Knyvet, who owned Staines. It was rumoured that Frances was "tyed to the Bed-Poste and severely whipped into consent". In September 1617, she was married to Viscount Purbeck at Hampton Court in the presence of the King and Prince Charles. The congregation noticed her crying when they joined hands.

== Aftermath of marriage ==
The marriage was an unhappy one. Viscount Purbeck was said to suffer from bouts of "insanity" (today believed to have probably been due to bipolar disorder). In 1621 the pair separated.

In October 1624, Frances gave birth to a son who was baptised as Robert Wright. Rumours began that the child's father was Robert Howard, a son of the Earl of Suffolk. In January 1625, King James signed a warrant for the trial for adultery of the couple in the ecclesiastical Court of High Commission. However, as her first biographer points out, "The prosecution of Lady Purbeck was pretty clearly at the instigation of Buckingham and not of Purbeck." In fact, the Duke seems to have become obsessed with his sister-in-law's behaviour and appears to have accused her not only of adultery but also of witchcraft. In February 1625, he urged the Lord Chief Justice to imprison both her and Robert Howard. Howard was confined in the Fleet Prison and Frances put under house arrest at the home of a London alderman. In March 1625, Howard was publicly excommunicated after he refused to answer to the charge against him and the proceedings were suspended.

The trial resumed in November 1627 under Bishop George Montaigne and Frances was convicted of "incontinency", or adultery. Among her twenty commissioner-judges (only one of whom, Charles Caesar, dissented from the judgment by excusing himself) was the poet John Donne, who was then Dean of St Paul's Cathedral.

== Later life and death ==
Frances failed to perform her penance of standing barefoot in a white sheet in church and was again put under house arrest. She escaped by disguising herself as a page-boy and fled from London to France where she lived in exile in Paris for several years with her son. She converted to Roman Catholicism and lodged for a time in a convent although she did not become a nun. In 1640, Frances petitioned the House of Lords for the return of her £10,000 marriage payment which had been appropriated by the Villiers family although she seems to have been unsuccessful. Eventually she returned to England, at the time of the English Civil War, where she died of illness during the second siege of Oxford in May 1645 at the age of 42. She is buried in the University Church of St Mary the Virgin.

== In literature and art ==
In the dramatist Ben Jonson's masque The Gypsies Metamorphosed (1621), the Second Gypsy addresses Lady Purbeck (who was among the original audience) as follows:

Help me wonder; here's a Book

Where I would for ever look;
Never yet did Gypsy trace
Smoother lines in Hand or Face;
Venus here doth Saturn move
That you should be Queen of Love
…
You shall turn all hearts to tinder,

And shall make the world one cinder.

During her exile in Paris, Kenelm Digby wrote of her: "I have not seen more prudence, sweetnesse, goodnesse, honor and bravery shewed by any woman that I know, than this unfortunate lady sheweth she hath a rich stock of. Besides her natural endowments, doubtless her afflictions add much; or rather have polished, refined and heightened what nature gave her." Arthur Wilson, the early historian of the reign of King James I, wrote in 1653 that she was "a Lady of transcending beauty, but accused for wantonness".

The first biography of Lady Purbeck was published by an Edwardian gentleman-scholar, Thomas Longueville, in 1909. However, it omits important facts since Longueville was unaware of legal documents in the Public Record Office discovered later by the author Laura Norsworthy and published in her biography of Frances' mother Lady Hatton, The Lady of Bleeding Heart Yard (1935). The well-known British author Antonia Fraser devotes part of a chapter of her The Weaker Vessel (1984) to a modern summary of Frances' life. A new biography by American historian Johanna Luthman, Love, Madness, and Scandal: The Life of Frances Coke Villiers, Viscountess Purbeck, was published by Oxford University Press in 2017.

The only known portrait of Lady Purbeck, painted by the Dutch artist Michiel Jansz. van Mierevelt of Delft and dated 1623, is on view to the public as part of the guided stairway tour at Ashdown House, Oxfordshire, a National Trust property.

== See also ==
- Mary & George
