= Holdenby House =

Historic house in Northamptonshire, England

Coordinates: 52.3039°N 0.9850°W

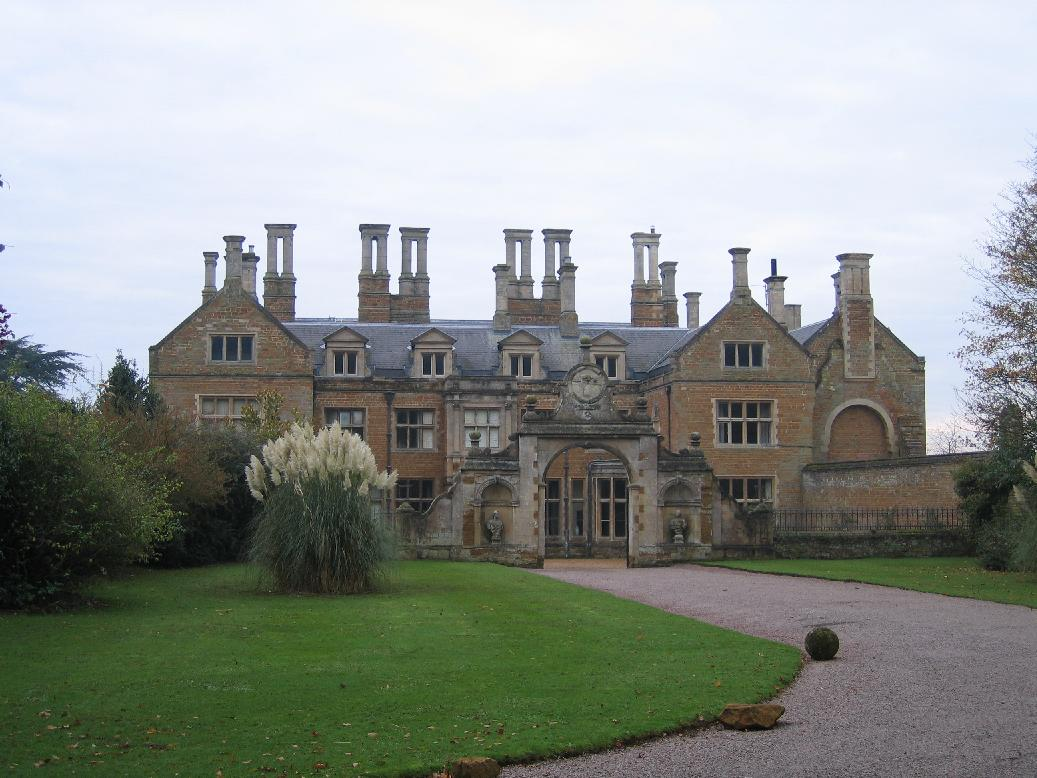
Holdenby House

Holdenby House is a historic country house in Northamptonshire, traditionally pronounced, and sometimes spelt, Holmby. The house is situated in the parish of Holdenby, six miles (10 km) northwest of Northampton and close to Althorp. It is a Grade II* listed building.

== History ==
The house was completed in 1583 by the Elizabethan Lord Chancellor, Sir Christopher Hatton, who refused to sleep a night in the mansion until Queen Elizabeth I had slept there. Thomas Heneage stayed at Holdenby in July 1583, and wrote to Hatton, congratulating him on the completion of "the best house that hath been built in this age".

It was one of the largest prodigy houses of the Tudor period, rivalling in size both Audley End and Theobalds, and was reputed to occupy approximately 78,750 square feet (7,300 m²), although this probably included the two great courtyards around which it was built. The facades were symmetrical, with mullioned windows and open Doric arcades, reflecting the Renaissance style of architecture gradually spreading from Italy. Hatton died in 1591.

In 1607, after a survey by John Thorpe, the mansion was bought by Elizabeth's successor James I. He intended it as a residence for his son, Charles, Duke of York. King James held a council at Holdenby in August 1608, and his wife Anne of Denmark also stayed at Holdenby in August 1608.

In February 1647, after the First English Civil War, Charles I was brought to Holdenby by the Scots and handed over to the English Long Parliament. He remained a prisoner there until June 1647 when Cornet George Joyce seized him and took him to Newmarket in the name of the New Model Army. Parliament later sold the estate to Captain Adam Baynes, who demolished the house almost entirely except for a small domestic wing.

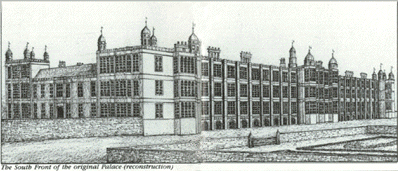
Holdenby Palace before its demolition in the 17th century

In 1709, Holdenby was bought by the Marlborough family who in turn sold it to their kin the Clifden family whose descendants in the female line, the Lowthers, still own the property as of 2014. The Clifdens had a new house built in the style of the older mansion, incorporating the older mansion's remains but being only about one eighth of its size. The first phase of the new house was designed by the architects Richard Carpenter and William Slater and built in 1873–75. A second phase was designed by Walter Mills and built in 1877–78.

As of 2014, all that remains of Hatton's great house are two Grade I listed archways and the kitchen wing incorporated into the Victorian rebuild, now standing on a lawn, which once gave access to the courtyards; a near-identical third arch bears the date 1659 and so must have been built for Baynes, the Cromwellian owner.

The gardens are listed Grade I.

A door salvaged from the demolition of Holdenby palace is believed to be inside Morningside Cottage, a grade II listed building in the nearby village of Creaton.

== Filming location ==
In July 2011, the exterior of Holdenby House was transformed as the location of Satis House in BBC One’s adaptation of Charles Dickens’s Great Expectations. Parts of the film Biggles (1986) were filmed at Holdenby. The house featured in a 2020 episode of An American Aristocrat's Guide to Great Estates.

== Functions and visits ==
The estate is a private residence which is available as a corporate and wedding venue and is opened to the public on a limited and paid basis. Other activities include a falconry centre.
