= Ely Place =

Street in Holborn, London

Coordinates: 51°31′7″N 0°6′25″W

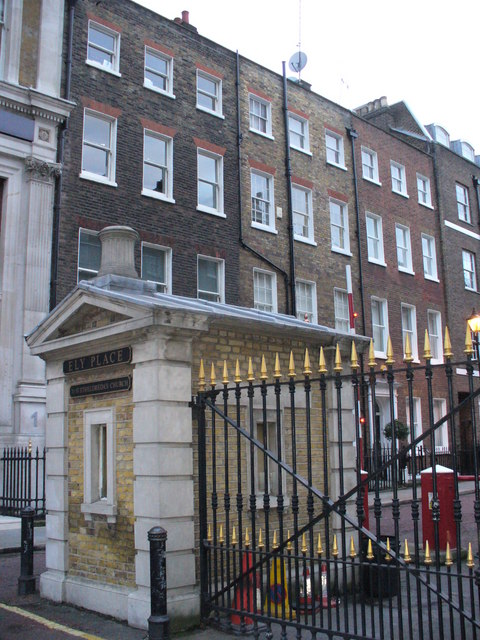
The beadles' gatehouse

Ely Place /ˈiːli/ is a gated road of multi-storey terraces at the southern tip of the London Borough of Camden in London, England. It hosts a 1773-rebuilt public house, Ye Olde Mitre, of Tudor origin and is adjacent to Hatton Garden.

It is privately managed by its own body of commissioners and beadles.

Ely Place sits on the site of the London residence of the Bishops of Ely, who regularly lived there between 1290 and 1772. The bishop's palace and surrounding land was then sold and redeveloped into Ely Place, with only the bishop's medieval chapel being preserved.

== History ==
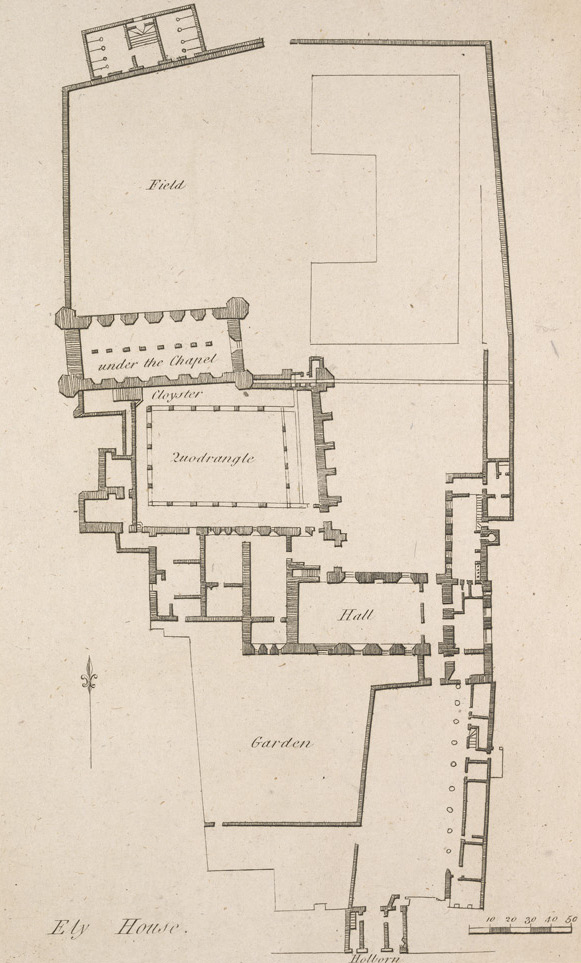
An 18th-century plan of Ely House

=== Origins ===
Ely Place stands on land that had been the site of Ely Palace or Ely House, the London townhouse of the Bishops of Ely from 1290 to 1772. Land in the Holborn area was bought by John de Kirkby in 1280. He was appointed Bishop of Ely in 1286 and on his death in 1290, he left the estate to the see of Ely. In medieval times, bishops of Ely frequently held high state office requiring them to live in London; Ely Palace was the bishop's official residence.

References to Ely Palace grounds occur in Shakespeare’s plays. It was at the house that in King Richard II, the Bard had John of Gaunt – who was living there in 1382 – says his "This royal throne of Kings, this sceptre’d isle" speech.

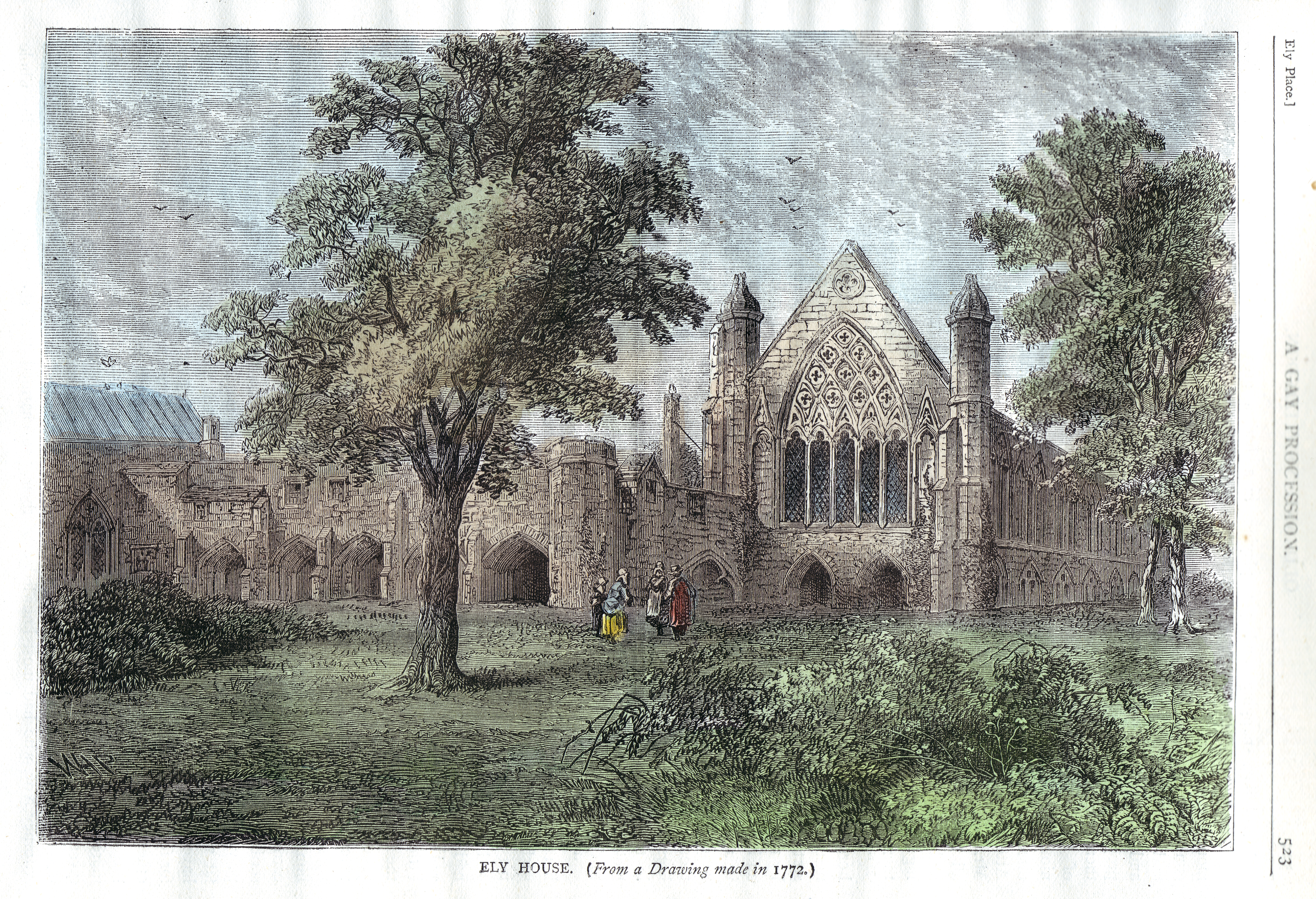
Ely House and St Ethedreda's chapel in 1772, wood engraving of 1878 after an old drawing

On 17 October 1546, James Butler, 9th Earl of Ormond, was visiting London with his household. Butler, a powerful Munster landowner who had served in the household of Cardinal Wolsey in his youth, had crossed Sir Anthony St Leger, the quarrelsome Lord Deputy of Ireland. Butler and his entourage were invited to dine at Ely Palace as guests of the Bishop of Ely. Ormond was poisoned along with his steward and 16 of his household; it was widely assumed to have been at the instructions of St Leger.

John Lesley, Bishop of Ross, who was acting as a diplomat for Mary, Queen of Scots, was held at Ely House under house arrest from 14 May to August 1571. Lesley's had a household of 25. He left the house with the Bishop of Ely on 17 August for his house at Fenstanton, giving tips to the Bishop's servants.

The estate was granted to Sir Christopher Hatton in 1577 after a commission was set up by Queen Elizabeth I, headed by John Aylmer (Bishop of London) to investigate the claims that Sir Christopher Hatton should be granted the freehold of the land after he acquired a 21 years lease on the estate and spent a sum of the £1,887 5s 8d (equivalent to £647,056 in 2025) on renovations and repairs. The commission declared in June 1577 that Ely Place should stay with Bishop Cox if he could reimburse Sir Christopher Hatton in whole for the outlay but he could not. A new lease was drawn up giving Sir Christopher Hatton control of the property freehold. He gave his name to Hatton Garden which occupies part of the site.

The house passed to Elizabeth Hatton, who disputed her property with her second husband Edward Coke. In 1622, the Spanish ambassador Gondomar told King James that she refused him and Coke access to the house.

The estate was sold to the Crown in 1772. The cul-de-sac was constructed in 1772 by Robert Taylor. Edmund Keene as Bishop of Ely commissioned a new Ely House, also built by Taylor, on Dover Street, Mayfair.

=== St Etheldreda's Church ===
St Etheldreda's Church in Ely Place is the former private chapel of the Bishops of Ely. It is one of two surviving buildings in London from the reign of Edward I (1272–1307) although it was badly damaged during World War II. The 13th-century crypt survived remarkably unscathed and is occasionally used for private functions. St Etheldreda, a seventh-century queen and founding abbess of the monastery at Ely, was the saint in whose name Ely Cathedral was dedicated.

The gardens of St Etheldreda were said to produce the finest strawberries in London and a Strawberry Fayre is held here every June. In Shakespeare’s Richard III, Gloucester tells the Bishop of Ely: "My Lord of Ely, when I was last in Holborn, I saw good strawberries in your garden there. I do beseech you, send for some of them".

=== Commissioners ===
Ely Place and Ely Mews Improvement Act 1842
- Act of Parliament
- Parliament of the United Kingdom
- Long title: An Act for paving, lighting, watching, cleansing, and improving Ely Place and Ely Mews, Holborn, in the County of Middlesex.
- Citation: 5 & 6 Vict. c.xlviii

Dates
- Royal assent: 18 June 1842

Text of statute as originally enacted

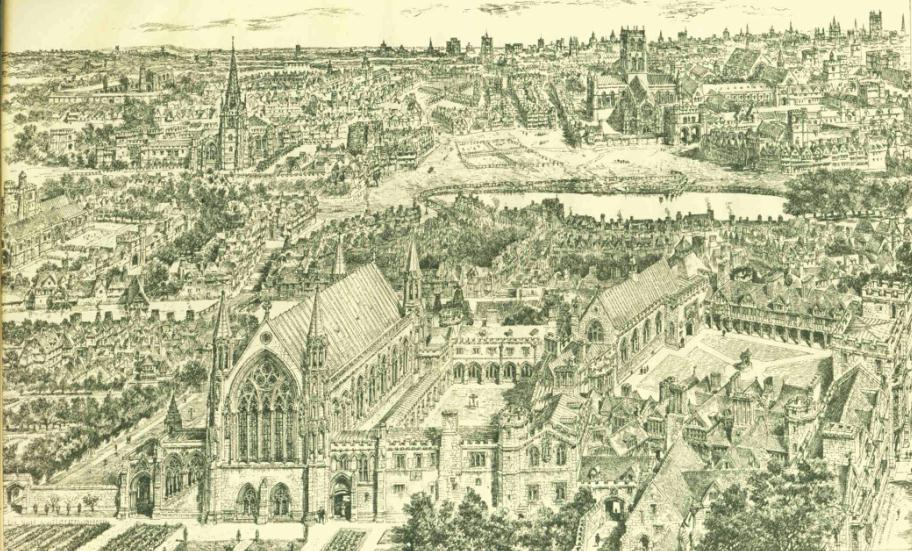
Reconstruction of Ely Place in the sixteenth century by Henry William Brewer

A local act of Parliament, the Ely Place and Ely Mews Improvement Act 1842 (5 & 6 Vict. c.xlviii), established a body of commissioners for paving, lighting, watching, cleansing and improving Ely Place and Ely Mews, Holborn, in the County of Middlesex. While the commissioners have lost most of their powers to local authorities established under the Metropolis Management Act 1855 (18 & 19 Vict. c. 120) and later legislation, they retain their "watching" duties, with a beadle discharging these duties.

== Transport ==
To the east is Farringdon Road and to the south is Holborn Circus. To the north is a gate leading to Bleeding Heart Yard. The nearest underground stations are Farringdon to the northeast and Chancery Lane to the west.
