= Hatton Garden =

Street and area in Holborn, London

Coordinates: 51°31′12″N 0°06′30″W

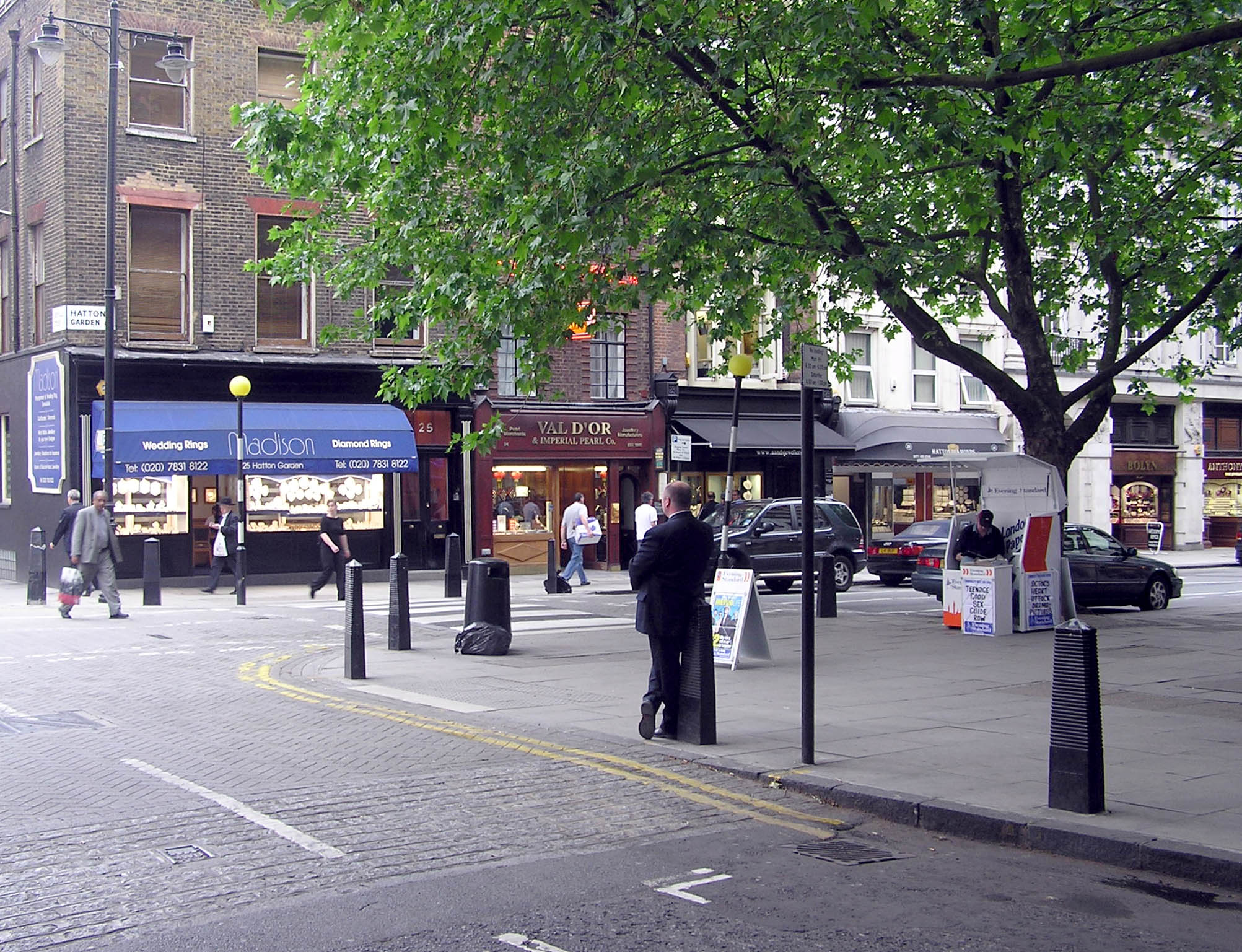
A scene in Hatton Garden

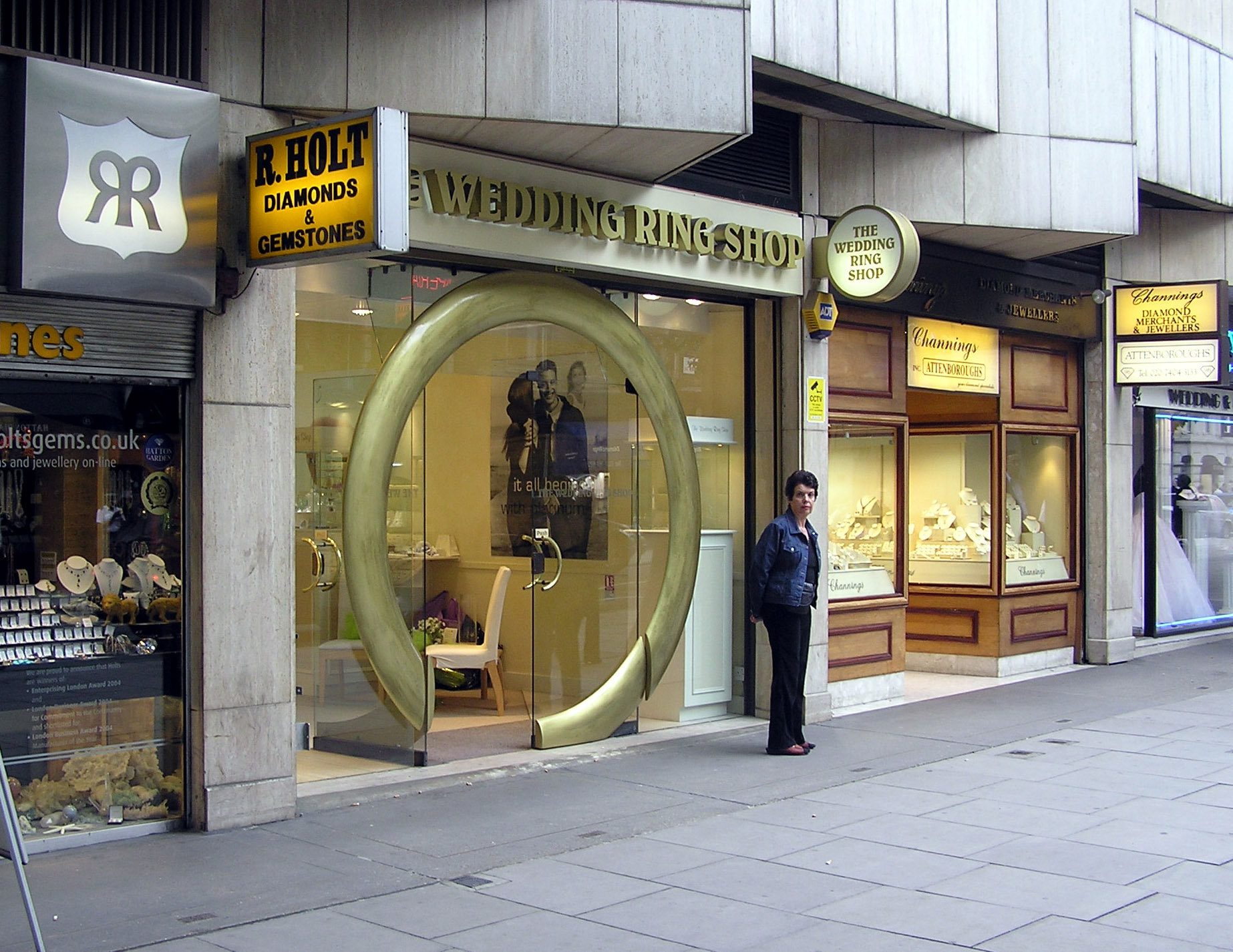
A ring shop in Hatton Garden

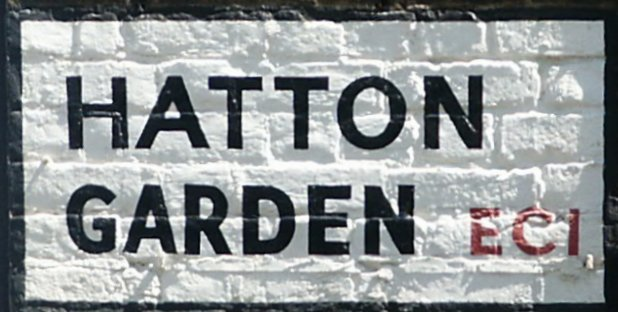
Painted road sign

Hatton Garden is a shopping street and commercial area in the London Borough of Camden. The area, which is London's principal diamond and jewellery quarter, is located in Holborn, on the fringe of London's West End.

It takes its name from Sir Christopher Hatton, a favourite of Queen Elizabeth I, who gained possession of the garden and orchard of the Bishops of Ely and established a mansion on the site. It remained in the Hatton family and was built up as a stylish residential development in the reign of King Charles II. For some decades it often went, outside of the main street, by an alternative name St Alban's Holborn, after the local church built in 1861.

St Etheldreda's Church in Ely Place, all that survives of the old Bishop's Palace, is one of only two remaining buildings in London dating from the reign of Edward I. It is one of the oldest churches in England now in use for Roman Catholic worship, which was re-established there in 1879.

The red-brick building now known as Wren House, at the southeast corner of Hatton Garden and St Cross Street, was the Anglican church for the Hatton Garden development. It was taken over by the authorities of a charity school, and the statues of a boy and girl in uniform were then added.

Surrounding streets including Hatton Place and Saffron Hill were improved during the 20th century and in modern times have been developed with blocks of 'luxury' apartments, including Da Vinci House (occupying the former Punch magazine printworks) and the architecturally distinctive Ziggurat Building.

== Hatton Garden development, 1659–1694 ==
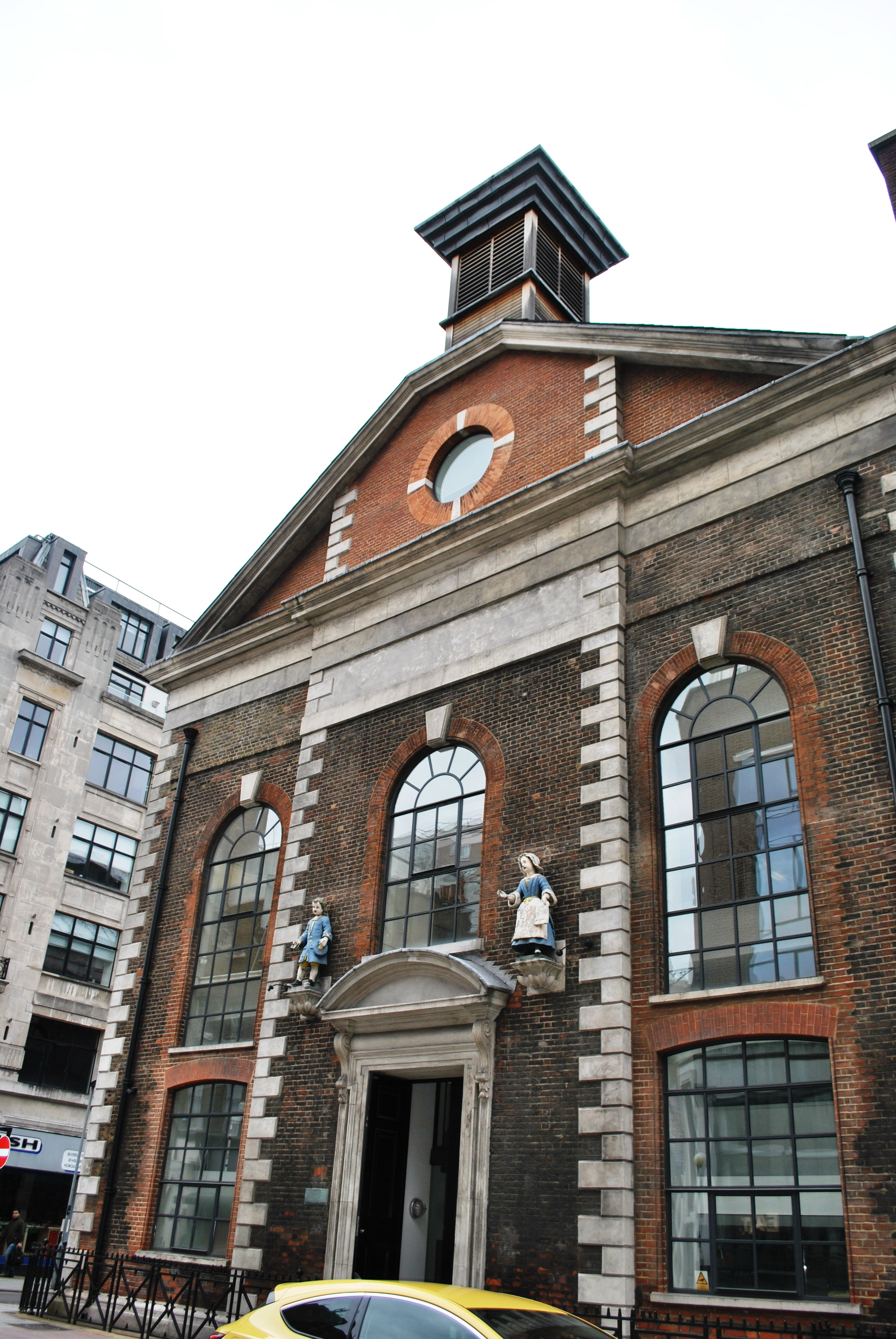
43 Hatton Garden, former 1686 church now known as Wren House

The Hatton Garden area between Leather Lane in the west and Saffron Hill in the east, and from Holborn in the south to Hatton Wall in the north, was developed as a new residential district in the Restoration period, between 1659 and 1694. It arose soon after the residential developments in Covent Garden and was contemporary with those of Bloomsbury Square.

It was formerly the site of the medieval London residence of the Bishops of Ely, and included a medieval palace, gardens and orchard. The palace stood on the site of Ely Place. During the 1570s Queen Elizabeth's Chancellor and favourite, Sir Christopher Hatton, held a lease of part of the site and developed Hatton House to the northwest of the palace. In 1581, he obtained a more permanent grant from Queen Elizabeth during a vacancy in the see, and after his death, it passed into the possession of Lady Elizabeth Hatton, the widow of Sir Christopher's nephew Sir William Newport (who changed his name to Hatton). At her death in 1646, during the English Civil War, it reverted to Christopher Hatton, 1st Baron Hatton, a close associate of Charles II in his exile in Paris during the Commonwealth period, 1649–1660.

The bishops disputed the Hattons' title, but, under the Protectorate, Bishop Matthew Wren was a prisoner in the Tower of London, and the palace itself was sequestrated to Parliamentarian uses and was badly damaged. To raise money Lord Hatton granted a long lease of the site in 1654, which became effectively permanent in 1658, though he retained the freehold. In 1659, John Evelyn observed Hatton Street (Hatton Garden road) being laid out from south to north, hard against the west side of the palace, as the beginning of a newly planned town district. Speculative builders took leases to construct tall and spacious adjoining houses to attract wealthy men at court, city officials and country gentlefolk wanting London homes, convenient for Clerkenwell and the Inns of Court.

In this way a varied but harmonious townscape, with attractive detail of porches and interior panelling, grew up on a rectangular grid of new streets. Charles Street (at first called Cross Street) was laid west to east as a continuation of Greville Street, and the Bishops' orchard, which (as shown in Richard Newcourt's map of 1658) the Hattons had laid out as a walled knot garden with a central fountain, lay north of that up to Hatton Wall. Hatton Street followed the line of its central path. By 1666, the year of the Great Fire, the development had advanced north to form two principal blocks up to the line of St Cross Street (then called Little Kirby Street). The remaining open land was used as a refuge by Londoners escaping the Fire, which did not consume Hatton Garden.

After Lord Hatton's death in 1670, the northern sector up to Hatton Wall was completed by 1694, in the time of his son Sir Christopher Hatton, 1st Viscount Hatton, whose agent was the noted accountant Stephen Monteage (1623–1687). Work on the Hatton Street church (now Wren House) commenced in 1685–86. Great Kirby Street, parallel to Hatton Street on the east side, enclosed a central block with rear gardens backing, but in the northern sectors, Hatt and Tunn Yard on the east (on the site of Hatton Place) and other small yards on the west provided access to smaller dwellings and coach houses. In the southern sectors King's Head Yard (later Robin Wood Yard, Robin Hood Yard) was similarly enclosed to the west, and to the east Bleeding Heart Yard (Arlidge's Yard, with Union Court) was developed near the palace by Abraham Arlidge (1645–1717), a carpenter of Kenilworth (Warwickshire) origins who worked extensively on the project and made his fortune by judicious investments. Arlidge's survey of 1694 shows the completed estate in detail: he succeeded Sir John Cass as Master of the Worshipful Company of Carpenters in 1712.

Among early residents were Christopher Merret, Robert Ferguson, John Flamsteed, William Whiston and Captain Thomas Coram.

Later the Hatton Garden estate was inherited by George Finch-Hatton esq (great-grandson of the 1st Viscount Hatton). He sold it in 1780s and had received around £100,000 and was to receive even more money as it sold further.

== Business ==
Hatton Garden is London's jewellery quarter and the centre of the diamond trade in the United Kingdom. This specialisation grew up in the early 19th century, spreading out from its more ancient centre in nearby Clerkenwell. Today there are nearly 300 businesses here in the jewellery industry and over 90 shops, representing the largest cluster of jewellery retailers in the UK. The largest of these businesses was De Beers, the international family of companies which dominated the international diamond trade, whose headquarters was based at 17 Charterhouse Street until 2016.

Sir Hiram Maxim had a small factory at 57 Hatton Garden and in 1881, invented and started to produce the Maxim Gun, a prototype machine gun, capable of firing 666 rounds a minute. Hatton Garden has an extensive underground infrastructure of vaults, tunnels, offices and workshops. The area is now home to many media, publishing and creative businesses, including Blinkbox and Grey Advertising.

== Crime ==
A "Great Robbery in Hatton Garden" occurred in late December 1678, when twenty men turned up at the house of a wealthy gentleman claiming to have a warrant to search the house for dangerous persons. After letting them in the owner asked to see the search warrant, whereupon he was forced at gunpoint into an inner room and locked in while the intruders rifled the house of its valuables. However, someone managed to escape and raised the alarm, and the thieves made a run for it. They were apprehended two days later while trying to dispose of the stolen property, which was recovered. George Brown, John Butler, Richard Mills, Christopher Bruncker and George Kenian were hanged at Tyburn for the offence on 22 January 1678/9.

In 1685, the notorious informer and confidence trickster Thomas Dangerfield, who was being returned to prison after a public whipping, was killed in Hatton Garden in an altercation with a barrister called Robert Francis, who struck him in the eye with his cane. Rather to the surprise of the general public, who thought the killing was an accident, Francis was convicted of murder and hanged.

In July 1993, thieves stole £7 million worth of gems belonging to the jewellers Graff Diamonds. This was London's biggest gem heist of modern times.

In April 2015, an underground safe deposit facility in the Hatton Garden area was burgled in the Hatton Garden safe deposit burglary. The total stolen may have had a value of up to £200 million, although court reports referred to £14 million The theft was investigated by the Flying Squad, a branch of the Specialist, Organised & Economic Crime Command within London's Metropolitan Police Service, leading to the arrests and March 2016 convictions of seven perpetrators.

== Street name etymologies ==
This is a list of the etymology of street names in the London district of Hatton Garden. Its area has no formally defined boundaries – those used here are the generally accepted ones of Clerkenwell Road to the north, Farringdon Road to the east, Holborn and Charterhouse Street to the south and Gray's Inn road to the west.

- Baldwins Gardens – from Richard Baldwin (or Baldwyn), gardener to Queen Elizabeth I and treasurer of the Middle Temple, who owned property in the area in the 16th century
- Beauchamp Street – from Beauchamp Court, the Warwickshire birthplace of Fulke Greville, 1st Baron Brooke, local property owner
- Black Bull Yard – unknown; this yard has now largely been covered by shop developments and is not accessible to the public
- Bleeding Heart Yard – thought to be from the sign of a former pub in this area called the Bleeding Heart
- Brooke Street, Brooke's Court and Brooke's Market – after Fulke Greville, 1st Baron Brooke, who owned a house near here in the 17th century
- Charterhouse Street – Anglicisation of "Chartreuse", from Grande Chartreuse, head monastery of the Carthusians in France. A nearby abbey was founded by monks of this order in 1371
- Clerkenwell Road – from a local well (the clerk's well), which gave its name to the area to this district.
- Dorrington Street – corruption of 'Doddington', from Anne Doddington, wife of Robert Grenville who owned a house near here in the 17th century
- Ely Court and Ely Place – after the Bishops of Ely, Cambridgeshire who owned much of this area prior to 1659
- Farringdon Road – from Sir William or Nicholas de Farnedon/Faringdon, local sheriffs or aldermen in the 13th century
- Gray's Inn Road – from Lord Gray of Wilton, owner of a local inn or townhouse which was later leased to lawyers in the 16th century
- Greville Street – from Fulke Greville, 1st Baron Brooke, who owned a house near here in the 17th century
- Hatton Garden, Hatton Place and Hatton Wall – from Sir Christopher Hatton, who was ceded much of this area from the Bishops of Ely by Elizabeth I in 1577–1580
- Holborn – thought to be from 'hollow bourne' i.e. the river Fleet which formerly flowed in a valley near here
- Kirby Street – from Christopher Hatton's Kirby Hall in Northamptonshire
- Leather Lane – thought to come not from 'leather' but from Leofrun, a personal name in Old English; formerly known as Le Vrunelane (13th century), Loverone Lane (14th century) and Liver Lane
- Leigh Place – from the Barons Leigh, who bought land in the area from the Baldwin family in 1689
- Lily Place
- Onslow Street
- Portpool Lane – thought to be a corruption of 'Purta's Pool', the local area is recorded as the manor of Purtepol in the early 13th century; written "Purple Lane" in Arlidge's Survey
- Saffron Hill and Saffron Street – these used to be the gardens of the Bishops of Ely, where they grew saffron
- St Cross Street – originally Cross Street, as it crossed land belonging to the Hatton family; the 'St' was added in 1937 to avoid confusion with numerous streets of the same name
- Verulam Street – from 16th–17th-century lawyer, scientist and philosopher Francis Bacon, later created Baron Verulam, who had chambers at Gray's Inn opposite
- Viaduct Buildings – after their position directly adjacent to Holborn Viaduct
- Waterhouse Square – after Alfred Waterhouse, architect of Holborn Bars, also known as the Prudential Assurance Building, which surrounds the square

== Hatton Garden in fiction ==
Michael Flanders and Donald Swann, humorists in the 1960s and 1970s, celebrated Hatton Garden's connection with the jewellery trade in their song of a sewage worker, "Down Below":

Hatton Garden is the spot, down below
Where we likes to go a lot, down below,
Since a bloke from Leather Lane,
Dropped a diamond down the drain,
We'll be going there again, down below.

Neighbouring Saffron Hill was the setting for Fagin's den in Oliver Twist)

In Evelyn Waugh's novel Brideshead Revisited, Rex Mottram takes Julia Marchmain to a dealer in Hatton Garden to buy her engagement ring:

He bought her a ring, not, as she expected, from a tray in Cartier's, but in a back room in Hatton Garden from a man who brought stones out of a bag in a little safe...then another man in another back room made designs for the setting with a stub of a pencil on a sheet of notepaper, and the result excited the admiration of all her friends.

Hatton Garden features in the children's novel Smith by Leon Garfield, where the main character tries to elude two pursuers through the crumbling streets of 18th-century Holborn.

In Ian Fleming's novel Diamonds Are Forever, James Bond visits the fictional House of Diamonds in Hatton Garden, where he meets the mysterious Rufus B. Saye.

The name of the street appears in a series of books Poldark by Winston Graham. (part 4 - 'Warleggan')

The Avengers, Series 2, Episode 10, "Death on the Rocks," is set in the diamond business in Hatton Garden.

The diamond robbery in the film A Fish Called Wanda takes place in Hatton Garden.

The 1924 mystery novel Inspector French's Greatest Case by Freeman Wills Crofts takes place in and around Hatton Garden.

== See also ==
- Hatton Garden Liberty
- Saffron Hill, Hatton Garden, Ely Rents and Ely Place
- List of eponymous roads in London
- London Diamond Bourse
