= Hunningham =

Village and civil parish in Warwickshire, England

Coordinates: 52°18′35″N 1°27′08″W

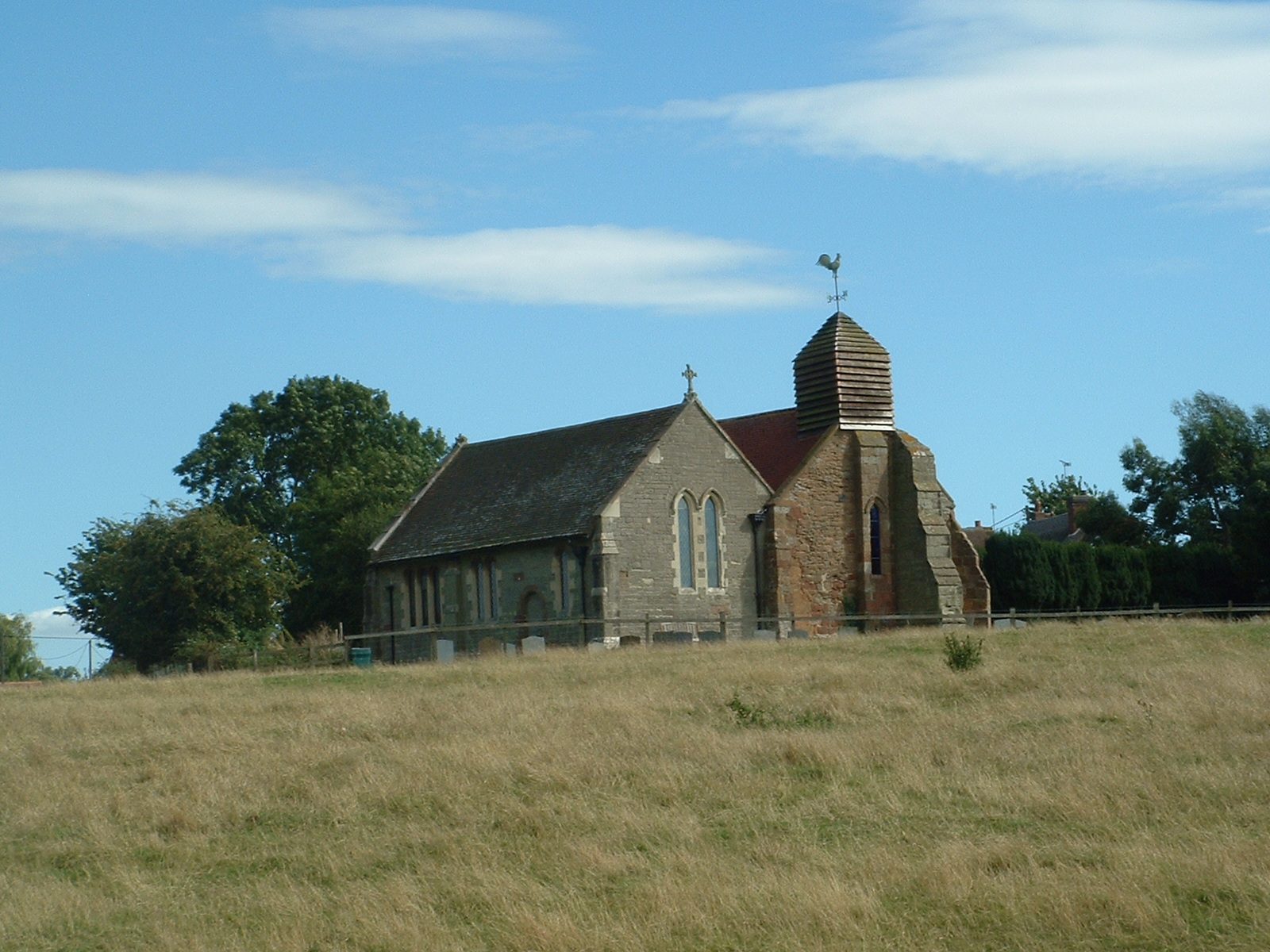
Church of St. Margaret

Hunningham is a small village and civil parish in Warwickshire, England. It is 3 miles to the north-east of Leamington Spa, within the Radford Semele ward. In 2005, the village population was 198. Hunningham village is part of the Manor of Hunningham. The history of the Manor of Hunningham is of great interest because it has been documented continuously for a thousand years, from the time of the Domesday Book, written in 1086, to the present day. The village public house is the Red Lion, which was refurbished in 2007 after flooding by the River Leam. There is local nature reserve where endangered species live. It also has a cricket club.
