= Christopher Hatton =

English politician and courtier (1540–1591)

The Right Honourable Sir Christopher Hatton
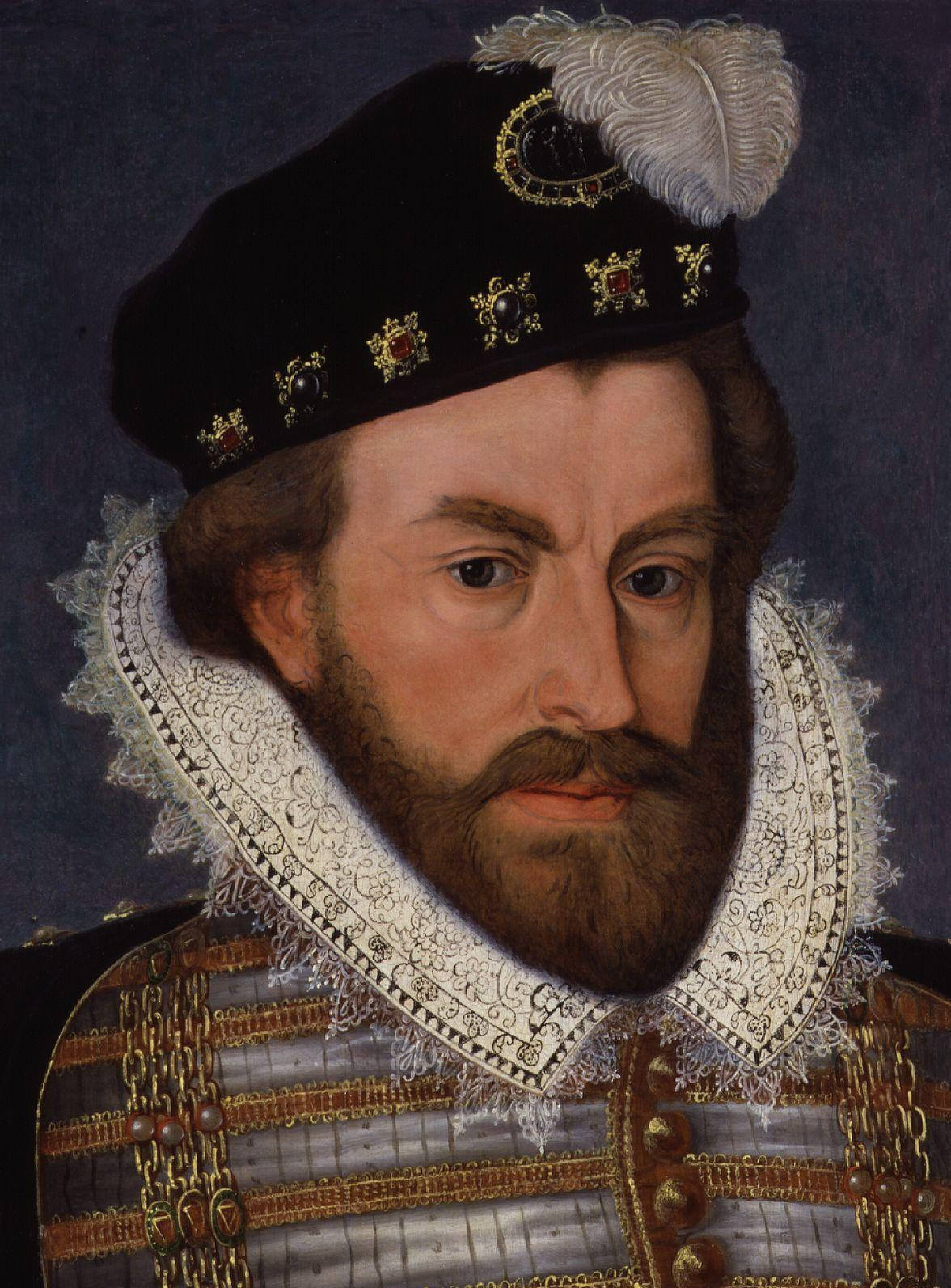
- Hatton c. 1575

Lord Lieutenant of Middlesex
- In office 27 October 1590 – 20 November 1591

Chancellor of Oxford University
- In office 1588–1591
- Preceded by: Sir Thomas Bromley
- Succeeded by: Thomas Sackville, 1st Baron Buckhurst

Lord High Chancellor of England
- In office 29 April 1587 – 22 November 1591
- Preceded by: Sir Thomas Bromley
- Succeeded by: In Commission

Lord Lieutenant of Northamptonshire
- In office 1586 – 20 November 1591

Vice-Admiral of the coast of Dorset
- In office 1582–1591
- Preceded by: Henry Ashley
- Succeeded by: Sir Carew Raleigh

Vice-Chamberlain of the Household
- In office 1577–1587
- Preceded by: Sir Francis Knowlys
- Succeeded by: Sir Thomas Heneage

Captain of the Yeomen of the Guard
- In office 1572–1586
- Preceded by: Sir Francis Knowlys
- Succeeded by: Sir Henry Goodere

Member of Parliament
- In office 1571–1587
- Preceded by: John Purvey
- Succeeded by: Sir Walter Mildmay; Sir Richard Knightley
- Constituency: Higham Ferrers (1571–1572); Northamptonshire (1572-1587)

Personal details
- Born: 12 December 1540
- Died: 20 November 1591 (aged 50)
- Resting place: St Paul's Cathedral
- Parent(s): William Hatton (father); Alice Saunders (mother)
- Education: Oxford University

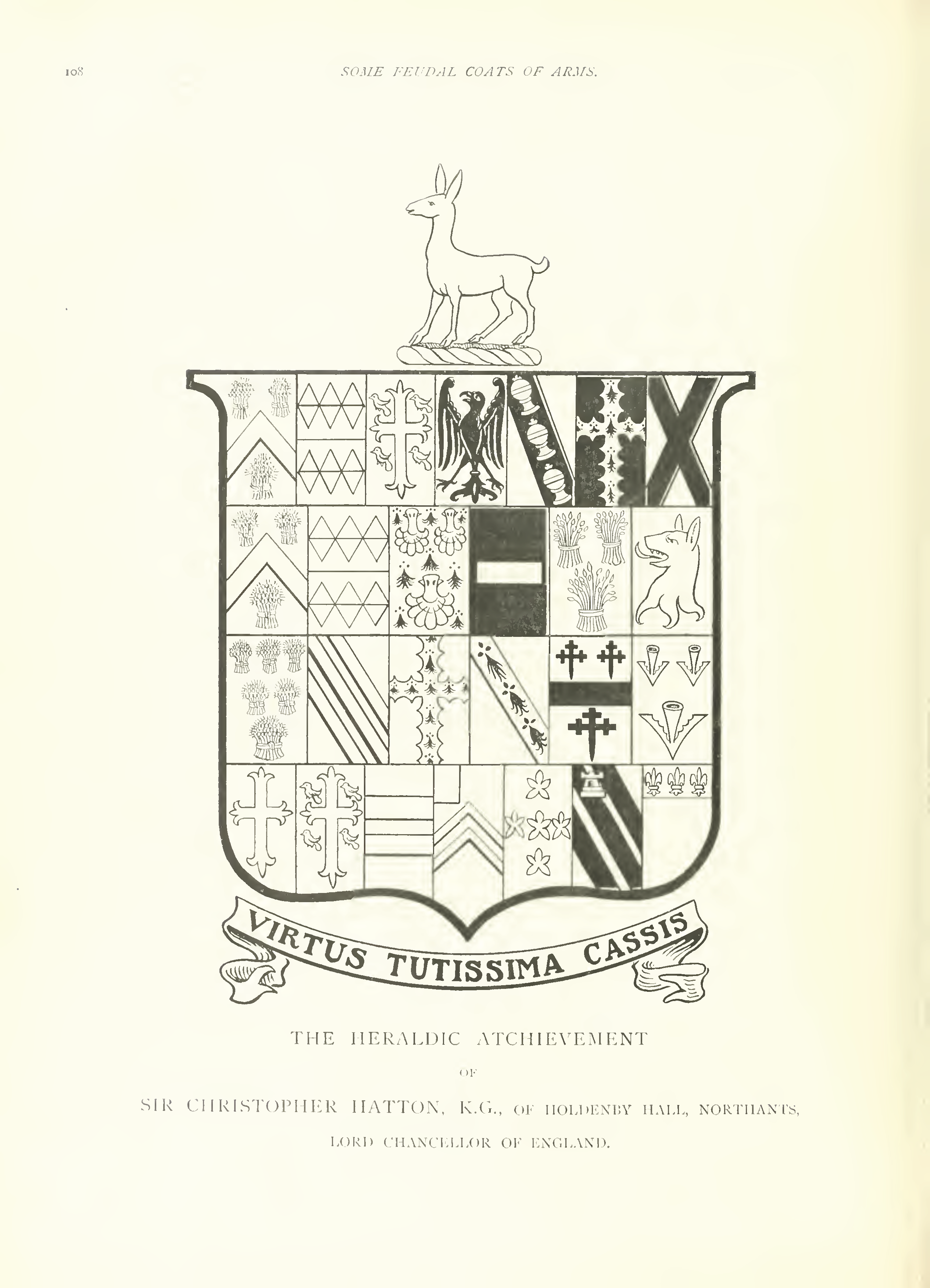
Arms of Sir Christopher Hatton, KG

Sir Christopher Hatton (12 December 1540 – 20 November 1591) was an English politician, Lord Chancellor of England and a favourite of Elizabeth I of England. He was one of the judges who found Mary, Queen of Scots guilty of treason.

== Early years ==
Sir Christopher was the second son of William Hatton (died 28 August 1546) of Holdenby, Northamptonshire, and his second wife, Alice Saunders, daughter of Lawrence Saunders (died 1544) of Harrington, Northamptonshire. His wife, Alice Brokesby was the daughter of Robert Brokesby (died 28 March 1531) of Shoby, Leicestershire, and of Alice Shirley. (Note: The date of death of Hatton's mother is not known, nor whether she remarried after William Hatton's death.)

On his father's side, the Hatton pedigree is said to be "traced beyond records". In the reign of Henry VII, Henry Hatton of Quisty Birches in Cheshire married Elizabeth, sole heiress of William Holdenby of Holdenby, Northamptonshire. Their son, John Hatton, settled at Holdenby and had three sons, of whom Christopher Hatton's father, William, was the eldest. He is said to have had two brothers, Thomas and William, and a sister Dorothy (died 1569), who married first John Newport (died 1566) of Hunningham, Warwickshire, then William Underhill (died 1570) of Idlicote, Warwickshire, whose son, also William Underhill (died 1597), sold New Place to William Shakespeare.

In 1567, Hatton's brother Thomas married John Newport's sister, Ursula Newport. However, Hatton's two brothers appear to have died relatively young and without issue. It was his sister Dorothy's son Sir William Newport who eventually became Hatton's heir, changing his name to Hatton.

Hatton's education is said to have been supervised by his maternal uncle, William Saunders (died c. 1583). Otherwise, nothing is known of his life until he entered St Mary Hall, Oxford, as a gentleman commoner at the age of 15 or 16. He left Oxford without a degree and enrolled in the Inner Temple on 26 May 1560. It is not known whether he was called to the bar.

== Career ==
In 1561, Hatton played the part of Master of the Game at a masque at the Inner Temple, and on a similar occasion attracted the attention of Queen Elizabeth. Handsome and skilled, Hatton's dancing quickly won him the Queen's favour and the nickname "The Dancing Chancellor". He came to court, according to Naunton, "by the galliard, for he came thither as a private gentleman of the Inns of Court in a masque, and for his activity and person, which was tall and proportionable, taken into the Queen's favour."

In 1564, he became one of the Queen's gentlemen pensioners and a gentleman of the privy chamber, and in July 1572 captain of the yeomen of the guard. On 11 November 1577, he became vice-chamberlain of the royal household and was sworn into the Privy Council. That same month he was knighted. In June 1578, the Queen formally granted him the Bishop of Ely's house in Ely Place, Holborn, despite vigorous protests from the Bishop. These appointments, with the valuable grants the Queen showered on him in these early years, prompted rumours that he was her lover, a charge specifically made in 1584 by Mary, Queen of Scots.

There were certainly close personal relations between them. In correspondence, the Queen called him her "Lyddes". He is said to have referred to himself in at least one letter as her "sheep". Yet Hatton "was probably innocent in the matter."

Hatton represented Higham Ferrers in Parliament in 1571 and from May 1572 was a member for Northamptonshire. He was active in Parliament in prosecutions of John Stubbs and William Parry. In 1576, he was granted land in Wellingborough by the Queen.

In 1581, he was one of those appointed to arrange a marriage between the Queen and François, Duke of Alençon, although he urged the Queen against it.

According to one account, Hatton once assured Mary, Queen of Scots he would fetch her to London if Queen Elizabeth died. Whatever the truth of this, Hatton's loyalty to his sovereign seems to have remained unquestioned. On one occasion, in December 1584, he led 400 kneeling members of the House of Commons in a prayer for the Queen's safety.

Hatton was a member of the law court that tried Anthony Babington in 1586 and one of the commissioners who found Mary, Queen of Scots, guilty of treason the following year. He vigorously denounced her in Parliament and advised William Davison to forward the warrant for her execution to Fotheringhay.

Hatton sent a ring with a letter to Sir Thomas Smith, to be presented to Queen Elizabeth. It was to be worn at the breast, and Hatton claimed for it "the virtue to expel infectious airs, and is, as it (the letter) telleth me, to be worn between the sweet duggs, the chaste nest of pure constancy." Sir Robert Cecil reported in August 1591 that the queen, who was at Portsmouth, wore a jewel in the form of bagpipes on her ruff that Hatton had sent her. The device alluded to shepherds and her nickname for him, "her mutton".

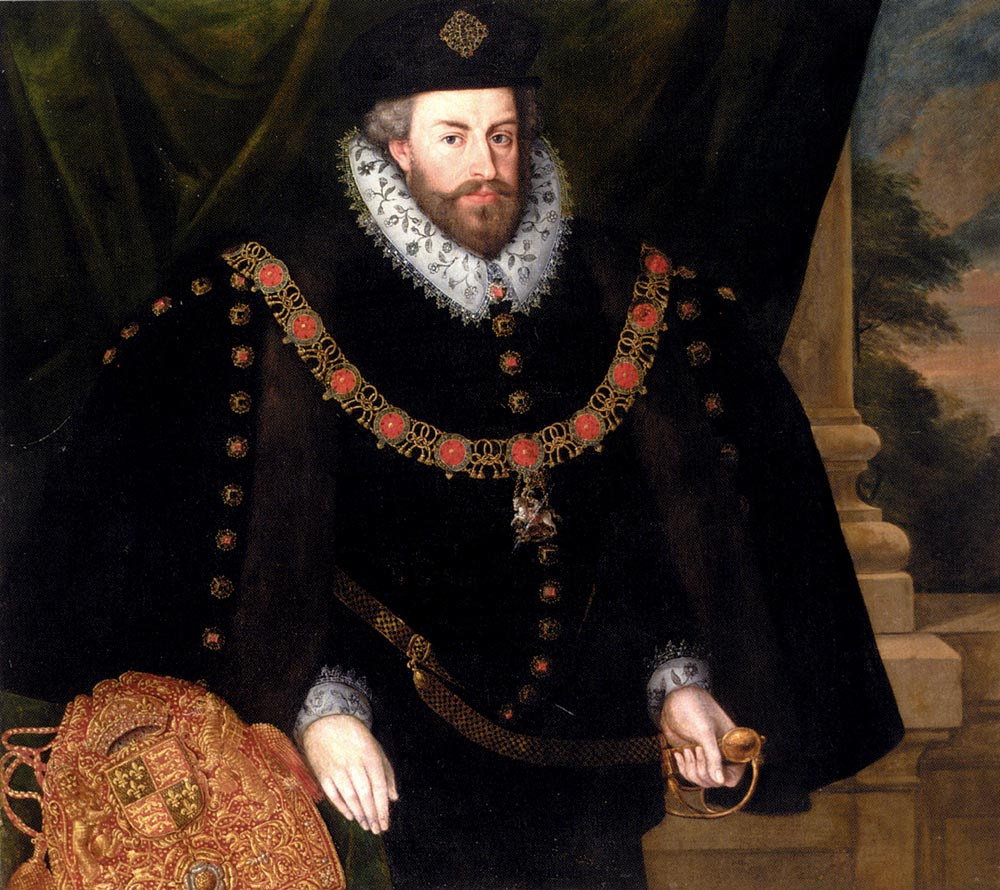
Sir Christopher Hatton as Lord Chancellor

In 1587 Hatton became Lord Chancellor. Though he had no great knowledge of the law, he appears to have acted with sense and judgement. He was said to have been a Roman Catholic in all but name, but treated religious questions in a moderate and tolerant way.

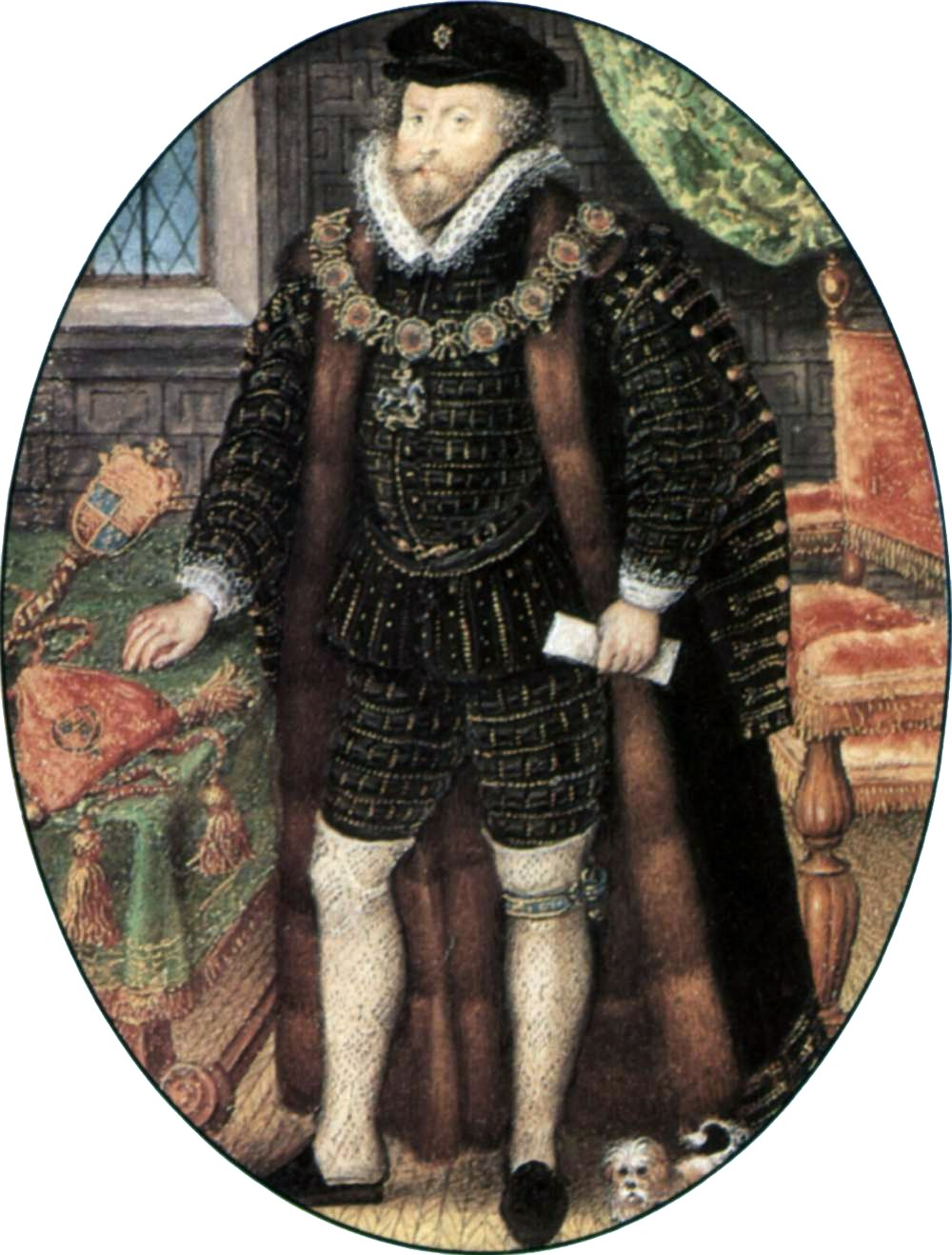
Sir Christopher Hatton as Lord Chancellor with his seal on the table by his side, by Nicholas Hilliard, 1588–1591

Hatton was chancellor of the University of Oxford. He is reported to have been parsimonious, but he patronized men of letters and Edmund Spenser was among his friends. He wrote the fourth act of a tragedy, Tancred and Gismund. His death occasioned several panegyrics in prose and verse.

== Wealth ==
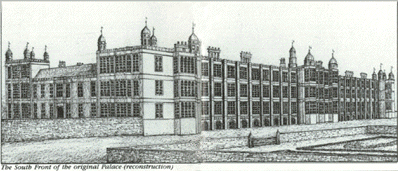
The original Holdenby House, since demolished and rebuilt

Hatton became wealthy through his progressing career and the Queen's fondness for him, and in 1583 he embarked on building at Holdenby, Northamptonshire, what was to be the largest privately owned Elizabethan house in England. It had 123 huge glass windows at a time when glass was very expensive – window numbers became a way to show wealth. It had two great courts and was as large as Hampton Court palace. It was three storeys high and had two large state rooms, one for himself and another for the Queen, should she ever stay, which she never did.

Lord Burghley, visiting the house in his old age, was impressed with the grand staircase from the hall to the state rooms and proclaimed the house so faultless he forgot the "infirmity of his legs" whilst he walked around. No expense was spared. Hatton even paid to move a village because it spoiled the view from one of his windows. However, the cost of the house drained his purse, so that Hatton was short of money for the rest of his life. No stranger to the financial strain of building, Burghley wrote to Hatton: "God send us both long to enjoy her, for whom we both meant to exceed our purses in these."

To maintain his dwindling wealth, Hatton began investing in some voyages of Francis Drake, including Drake's acts of piracy in Spanish America. During Drake's subsequent circumnavigation of the globe, when he reached the Straits of Magellan, he renamed his ship The Golden Hind in honour of Hatton's coat of arms, which contained a golden hind, and of all the Spanish gold on board. Hatton made a profit of £2300 from this expedition.

== Death ==
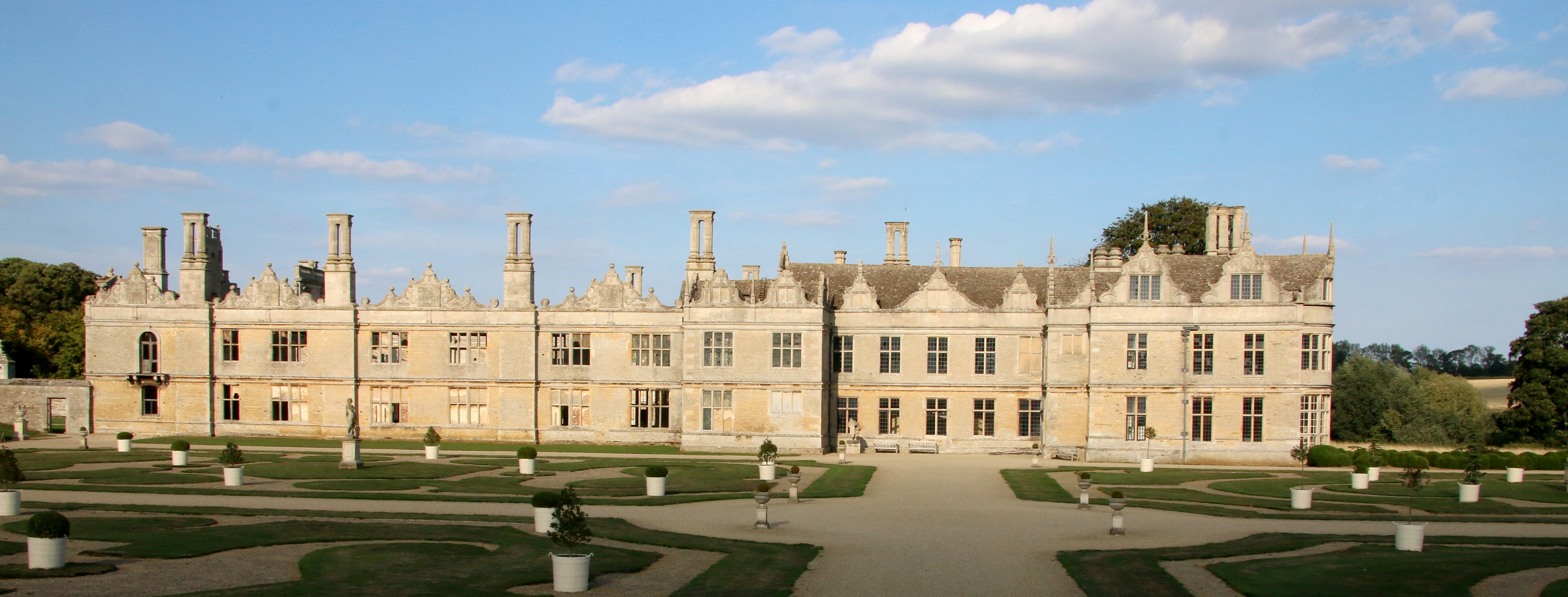
Kirby Hall, Northamptonshire. Relatively unchanged.

Despite his successes, Hatton died with large debts a few years after his Holdenby mansion was completed in 1583. Hatton claimed to refuse to sleep there until Queen Elizabeth I would do so. The remains of the original Holdenby House are a room incorporated into a replacement building in the 1870s; part of the pillared doorway contains two arches, inscribed with the date 1583 in the gardens, as well as drawings and plans. He had begun to build his other country house, Kirby Hall, in 1570. It was based on French architectural designs and expanded in Classical style over the decades.

Hatton's health declined in 1591. The Queen visited him on 11 November. Nine days later he died at Ely Place and was given a state funeral at St Paul's Cathedral on 16 December. A grand monument to him stood at the high altar of Old St Paul's, "towering above it – an outrage to the susceptibilities of the devout but an object of marvel to London sightseers – until the Great Fire of 1666 dethroned and destroyed it." Hatton is listed on a modern monument in the crypt as one of the important graves lost.

Although he seems to have had an illegitimate daughter, Hatton never married, and his large and valuable estates descended to his nephew, Sir William Newport (1560–1597), son of his sister Dorothy Hatton, who took the surname Hatton. When the latter died without male issue in 1597, the estates passed to Sir Christopher Hatton's first cousin once removed and namesake godson, another Sir Christopher Hatton (died 1619), whose son and successor, Christopher became Baron Hatton of Kirby and his son Christopher became Viscount Hatton. This line still continues with the Finch-Hattons.

== Commemorations ==
Hatton Garden, heart of the UK's trade in cut diamonds, stands on the site of Hatton's London home and grounds. Sir Christopher Hatton Academy was founded in 1983 in Wellingborough, Northamptonshire.

== In popular culture ==
In the 2007 film Elizabeth: The Golden Age, Sir Christopher Hatton is portrayed by Laurence Fox.

== See also ==
- Corfe Castle

== Notes ==
Political offices
| Unknown | Lord Lieutenant of Northamptonshire; 1576–1591 | Vacant Title next held by The Lord Burghley |
| Preceded by Henry Ashley | Vice-Admiral of Dorset; 1582–1591 | Succeeded by Sir Carew Raleigh |
| Preceded by Sir Francis Knollys | Captain of the Yeomen of the Guard; 1578–1587 | Succeeded by Henry Goodier |
| Preceded by Sir Thomas Bromley | Lord Chancellor; 1587–1591 | Succeeded by In Commission |
Academic offices
| Preceded by Sir Thomas Bromley | Chancellor of the University of Oxford; 1588–1591 | Succeeded by The Lord Buckhurst |
