= Holmby =

Holmby may also refer to:

- Holmby Hills, Los Angeles, a neighborhood on the Westside of Los Angeles, California
  - Holmby Park
  - Holmby Hall
- Holdenby House, house in Northamptonshire, traditionally pronounced, and sometimes spelt, Holmby
- Holmby Runestone, a Viking Age memorial runestone bearing the image of a ship
