= Ralphs Grocery Store (Los Angeles, California) =

- U.S. National Register of Historic Places
- Los Angeles Historic-Cultural Monument
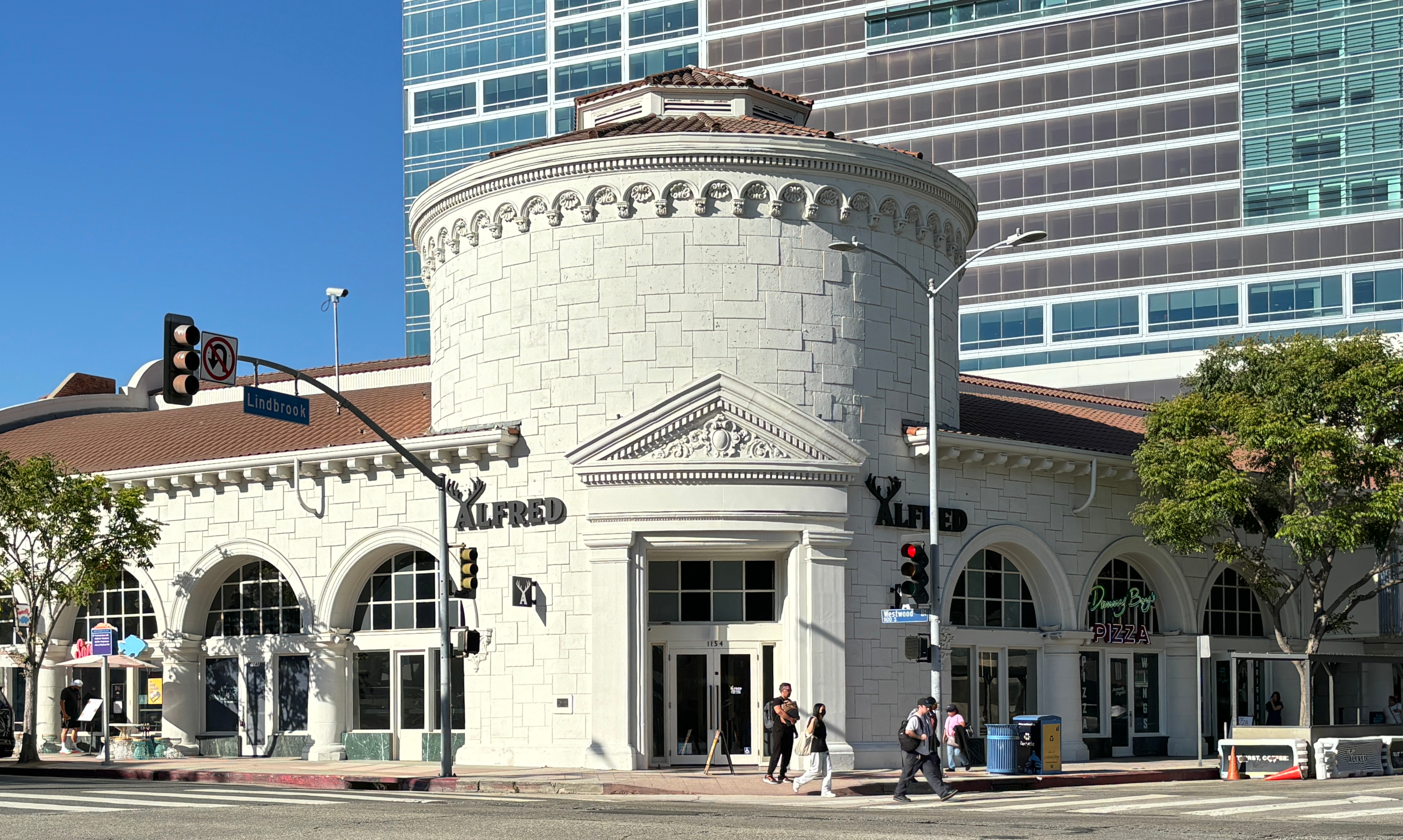
- Tower on the former Ralphs Grocery Store, 2024

- Location within the Los Angeles metropolitan area Location within California Location within the United States
- Location: 1142–1154 Westwood Boulevard & 10887–10889 Lindbrook Drive, Westwood Village, Los Angeles, California
- Coordinates: 34°3′35.5″N 118°26′40″W
- Built: 1929
- Architect: Russell E. Collins, S.N. Benjamin
- Architectural style: Mission Revival/Spanish Colonial Revival
- NRHP reference No.: 92000969
- LAHCM No.: 360

Significant dates
- Added to NRHP: July 30, 1992
- Designated LAHCM: June 21, 1988

Ralphs Grocery Store is a historic building in the Westwood Village section of Westwood, Los Angeles, California. Built in 1929 as a Ralphs Grocery Store, it was one of the original six buildings in the Westwood Village development. The building was noted for its cylindrical rotunda capped by a low saucer dome, with a pediment over the entrance and arcaded wings extending north and east. It was photographed by Ansel Adams in 1940, declared a Historic-Cultural Monument in 1988, and listed on the National Register of Historic Places in 1992.

== Origins of Westwood Village ==
The history of Westwood Village began in 1925, when the Regents of the University of California purchased a large block of land from the Janss Investment Company for the construction of the new UCLA campus. The Janss family retained ownership of the land south of the campus and there developed Westwood Village — a carefully planned commercial center that was to be "a model college town." The university and the Janss family agreed to harmonize the architecture of the campus and the village in a "Mediterranean style."

== Building architecture and opening ==
The new Westwood Village began to open in 1929, and one of its original buildings was the Ralphs Grocery Store located on Westwood Boulevard, one block north of Wilshire Boulevard. The store's most prominent feature was its low rotunda, at the corner of Westwood Boulevard and Lindbrook Drive. The building's exterior walls were built with imitation stone, but were later covered with stucco. The building's style has been described as having Mission Revival, Spanish Colonial Revival, Romanesque Revival and Renaissance Revival elements, and is said to have served as a model for other low-rise commercial structures in the village. Early advertising materials for the Westwood Village development featured images of the Ralphs tower and the Janss dome, which became area landmarks. The opening of the store in the fall of 1929 was timed to coincide with the opening of the UCLA campus, and the Los Angeles Times proclaimed the store "one of the most beautiful exclusive grocery marts in the West." The opening was celebrated with a free food show, as Ralphs boasted a new feature at their Westwood store — "the employment of uniformed boys to wrap each purchase of merchandise while it is being paid for at the cashier's stand, and then carry it to the customer's car."

In 1940, Ansel Adams took a series of photographs of Westwood Village, some featuring the Ralphs building. The photographs are part of the collections of the Los Angeles Public Library and can be viewed here, here and here.

== Business operations ==
Ralphs operated a grocery store on the site until the mid-1960s, when it left Westwood Village. Ralphs returned to Westwood Village nearly 40 years later, converting the old Bullock's department store into a grocery store (formerly sharing the space with a Best Buy and an Expo Home Design Center). Since Ralphs vacated the building in the mid-1960s, it has housed a number of different businesses. In 1970 a large portion of the space facing Lindbrook Drive was converted into a movie theater, which was known over the years as the United Artists Theater, (where The Rocky Horror Picture Show made its US debut on September 26, 1975) the UA Egyptian, the Odeon Cinema, and finally as the Mann Festival which closed on July 30, 2009. The Bratskeller restaurant, popular with UCLA students, also operated at the building from the late 1960s through the mid-1980s. In the late 1990s and early 2000s the prime corner space at the base of the tower was split between Daphne's Greek Cafe and Togo's Sandwich Restaurant. In late 2008, they were replaced with a Peet's Coffee & Tea, which shuttered in 2020 and was replaced by Alfred Coffee in 2021. In early 2012, part of the shuttered movie theater was converted into 800 Degrees Neapolitan Pizzeria, which was then replaced by Danny Boy's Famous Original pizzeria in 2024.

== Historic preservation and designation ==
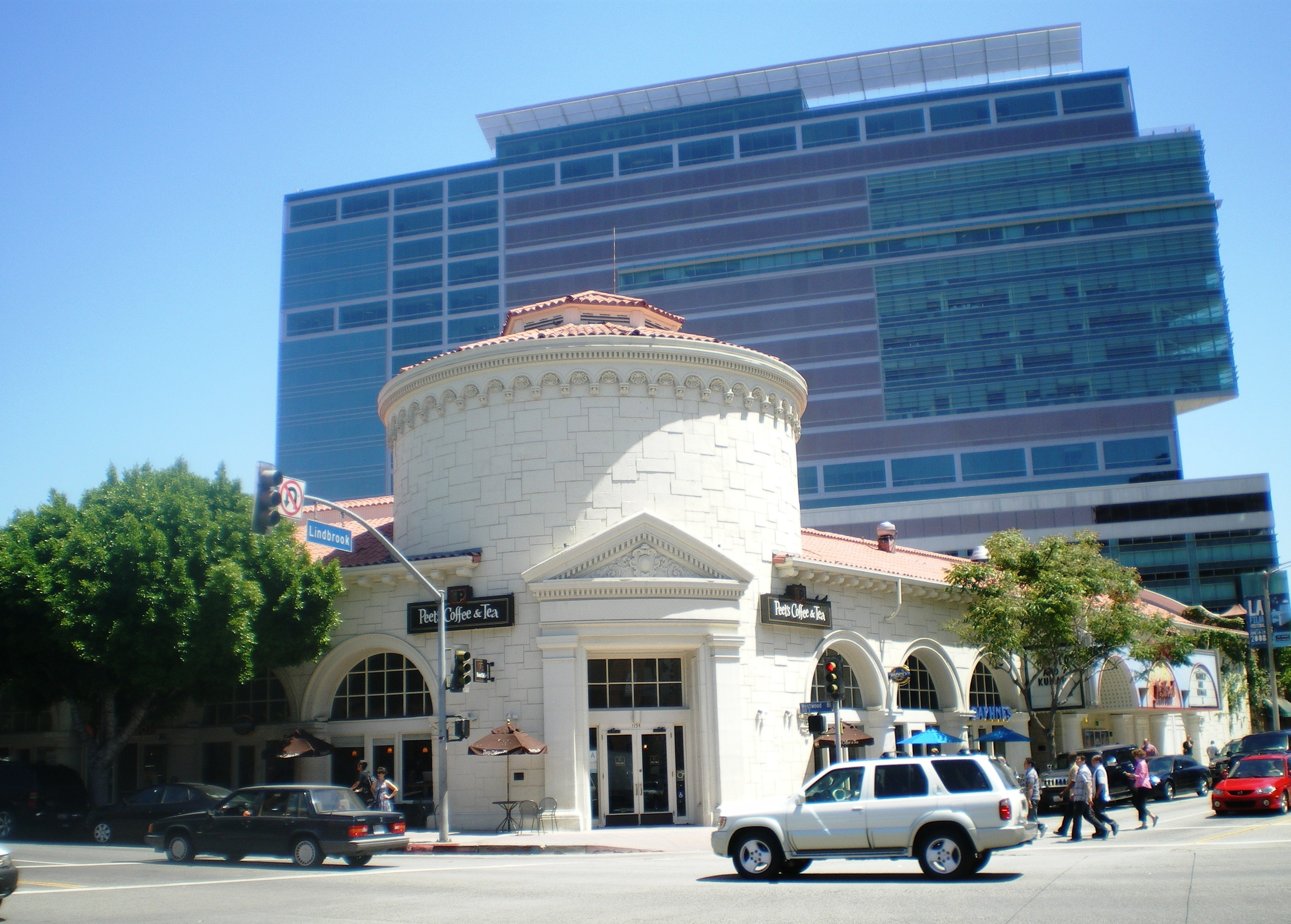
Modern high rise behind Spanish-Mediterranean Ralphs building

Since the 1970s, the demand for office and residential space around the UCLA campus has resulted in much of the original Mediterranean architecture giving way to large modern high rises, as depicted in the photograph to the right. Preservationists sought to preserve what could be saved of the original Westwood architecture, and in 1988 the Ralphs-Bratskeller-Egyptian Theater building was designated as a Historic Cultural Monument (HCM #360) by the Los Angeles Cultural Heritage Commission. Eight other historic buildings in Westwood Village (including the Fox Bruin Theater, the Fox Village Theater and the Janss Investment Company Building) were given monument status at the same time. In 1992, the Ralphs building was also added to the National Register of Historic Places.

== See also ==
- List of Registered Historic Places in Los Angeles
