= Westwood Boulevard =

Major street in Los Angeles, California

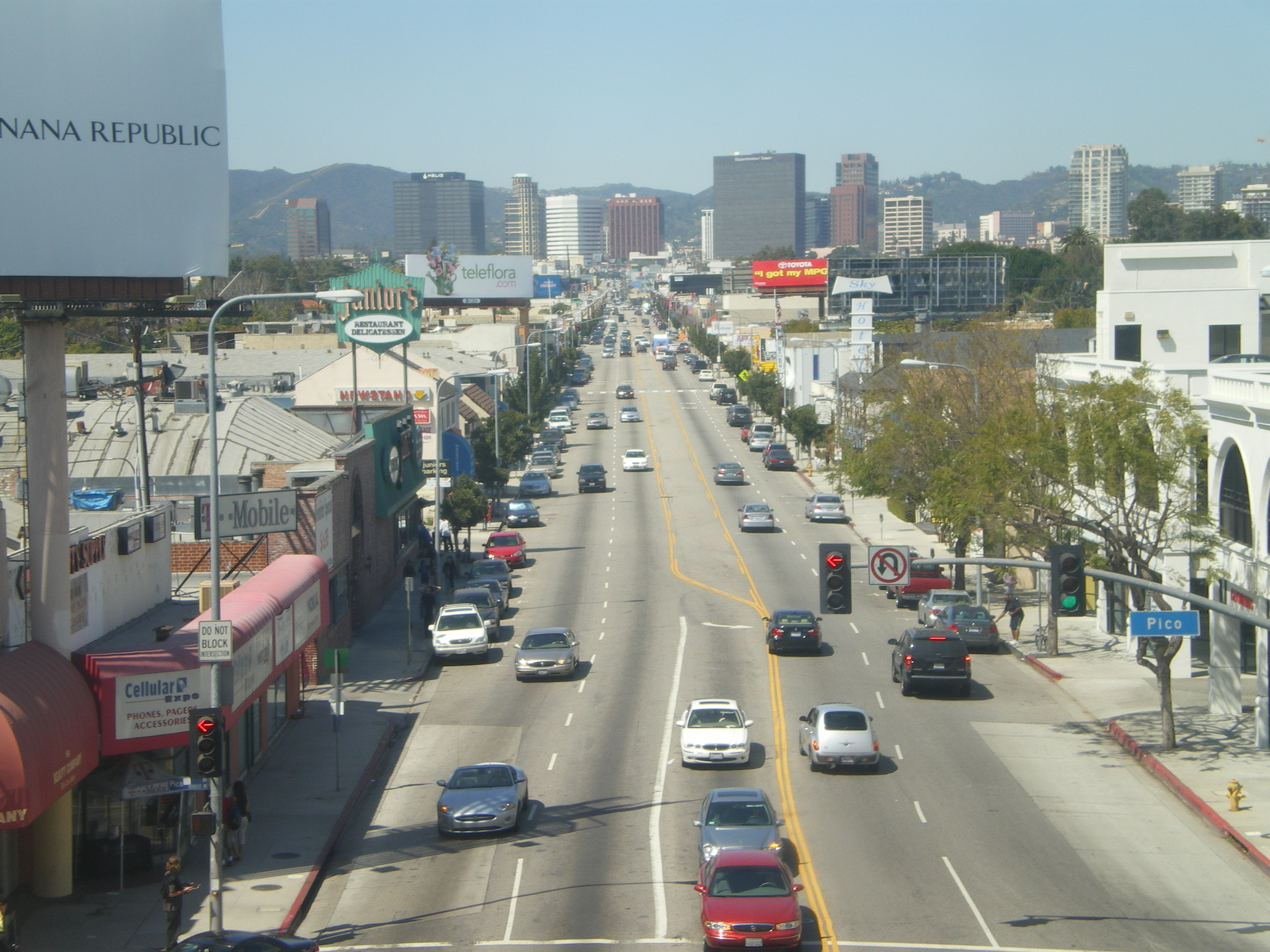
Looking north on Westwood Boulevard into Westwood, from the former Westside Pavilion mall

Westwood Boulevard is a street in Los Angeles that runs through the heart of Westwood Village and further south in West Los Angeles.

== Route ==
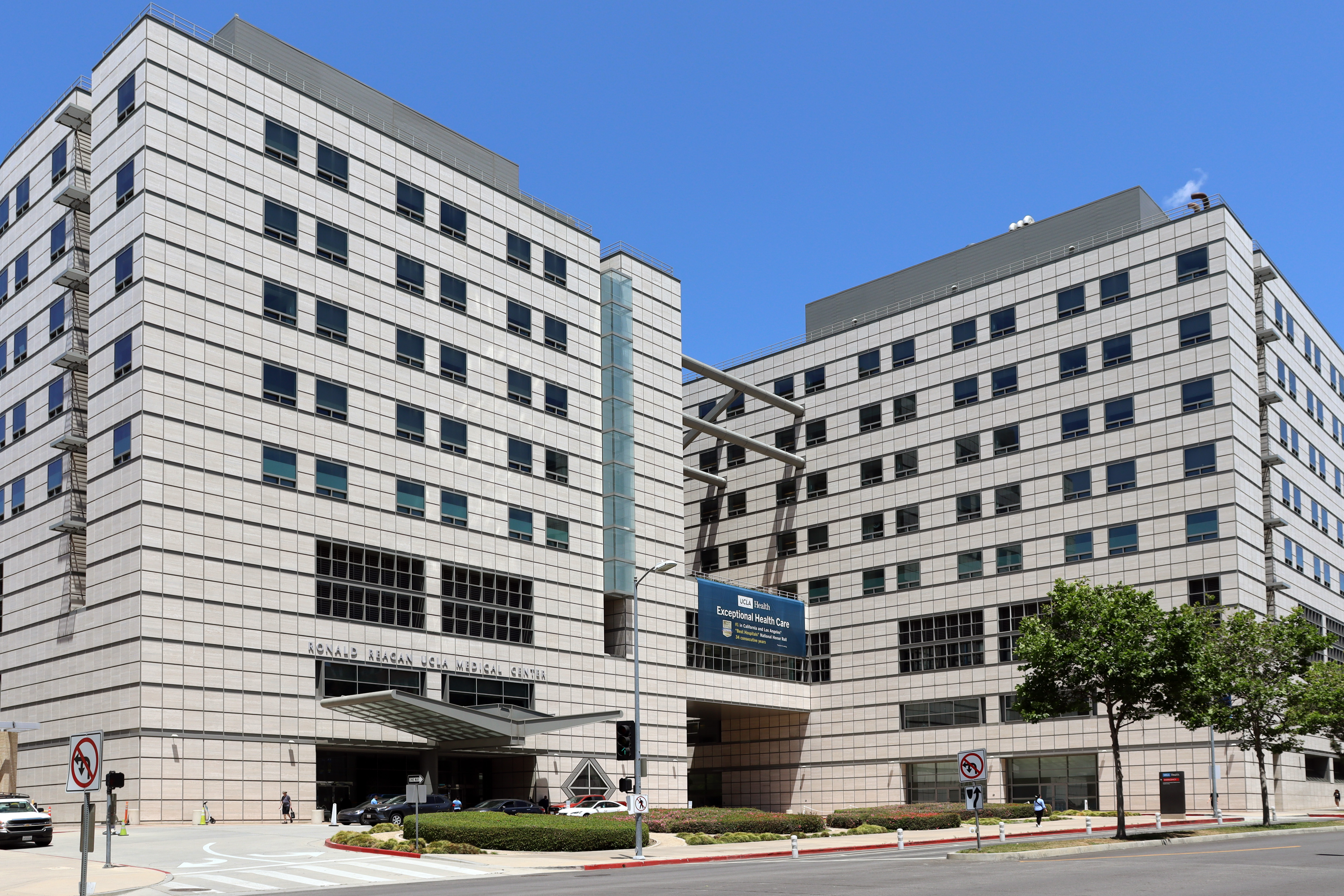
Ronald Reagan UCLA Medical Center on Westwood Boulevard

Westwood Boulevard begins south of Sunset Boulevard in the campus of UCLA as Westwood Plaza. After exiting UCLA, it is one of two major thoroughfares in Westwood Village. Its intersection with Wilshire Boulevard is one of the busiest in Los Angeles, with seven through lanes and four left turn lanes (going east/west). Most of the large office buildings in Westwood are located on Wilshire Boulevard.

South of Wilshire, Westwood Boulevard continues as a four-lane boulevard passing through many small businesses. This area of Westwood south of Wilshire Boulevard is often referred to as Tehrangeles because of its large Iranian-American population. Many of the businesses along Westwood Boulevard are Persian, reflecting these demographics. In particular, Westwood Boulevard is noted for a large number of Persian restaurants. Farther south, the Westside Pavilion Mall was formerly located at Westwood Boulevard's intersection with Pico Boulevard.

Westwood Boulevard ends south of National Boulevard in the Palms neighborhood of Los Angeles, as it curves to the east at Malcolm Avenue and turns into National Place. Later, National Place becomes National Boulevard when it crosses Overland Avenue. At this point, Westwood Boulevard is a primarily residential street.

Westwood Boulevard comes back further south at Charnock Road and finally ends on Washington Boulevard.

Plans to install bike lanes near UCLA in the 2010s were contentious and ultimately unsuccessful, meeting opposition from city council member Paul Koretz and some local residents, who claimed they would remove parking and worsen traffic. Proposals to move the bike lanes to nearby Gayley Avenue were not implemented.

LADOT plans to install dedicated bus lanes and protected bike lanes along Westwood Boulevard from the Westwood/Rancho Park E Line station to the UCLA campus in 2027 in compliance with Measure HLA (Healthy Streets LA), a safe streets ballot measure passed in the 2024 Los Angeles elections.

== Transportation ==
- Santa Monica Freeway (Interstate 10, formerly US Route 66) crosses over Westwood Boulevard.
- Santa Monica Transit lines 8 and 12 run through Westwood Boulevard.
- An underground station for the Metro D Line at Wilshire Boulevard is currently under construction and due to open in late 2027.
- The Metro E Line operates a rail station at Exposition Boulevard.

== Notable landmarks ==
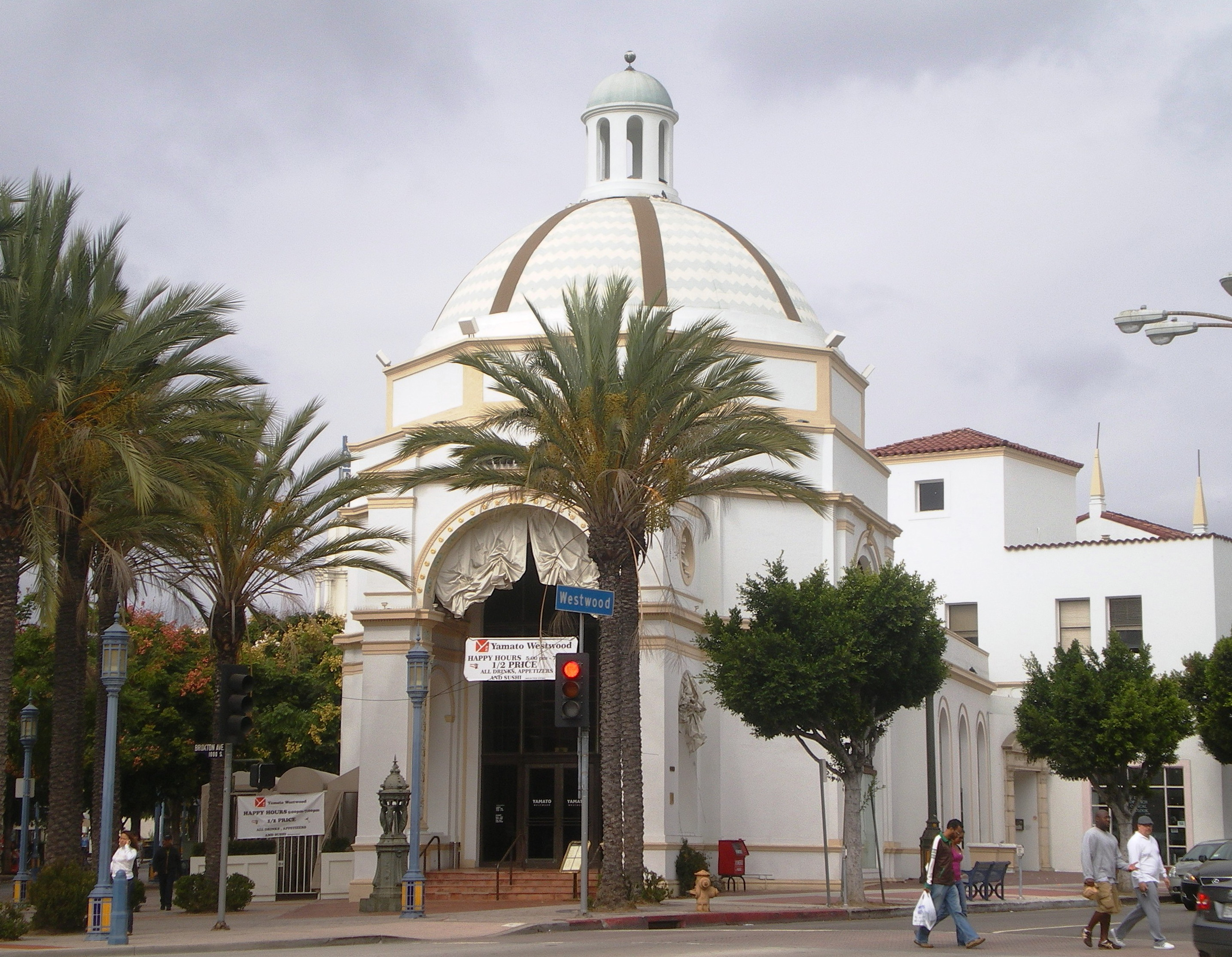
Janss Investment Company Building

- Holmby Hall
- Janss Dome
- Ralphs Grocery Store building (Bratskeller - Egyptian Theater)
- Crest Theatre
- Hammer Museum
- Ronald Reagan UCLA Medical Center
- Westside Pavilion
- Liberal Arts Masonic Temple
