= Westwood, Los Angeles =

Westwood
- Neighborhood of Los Angeles
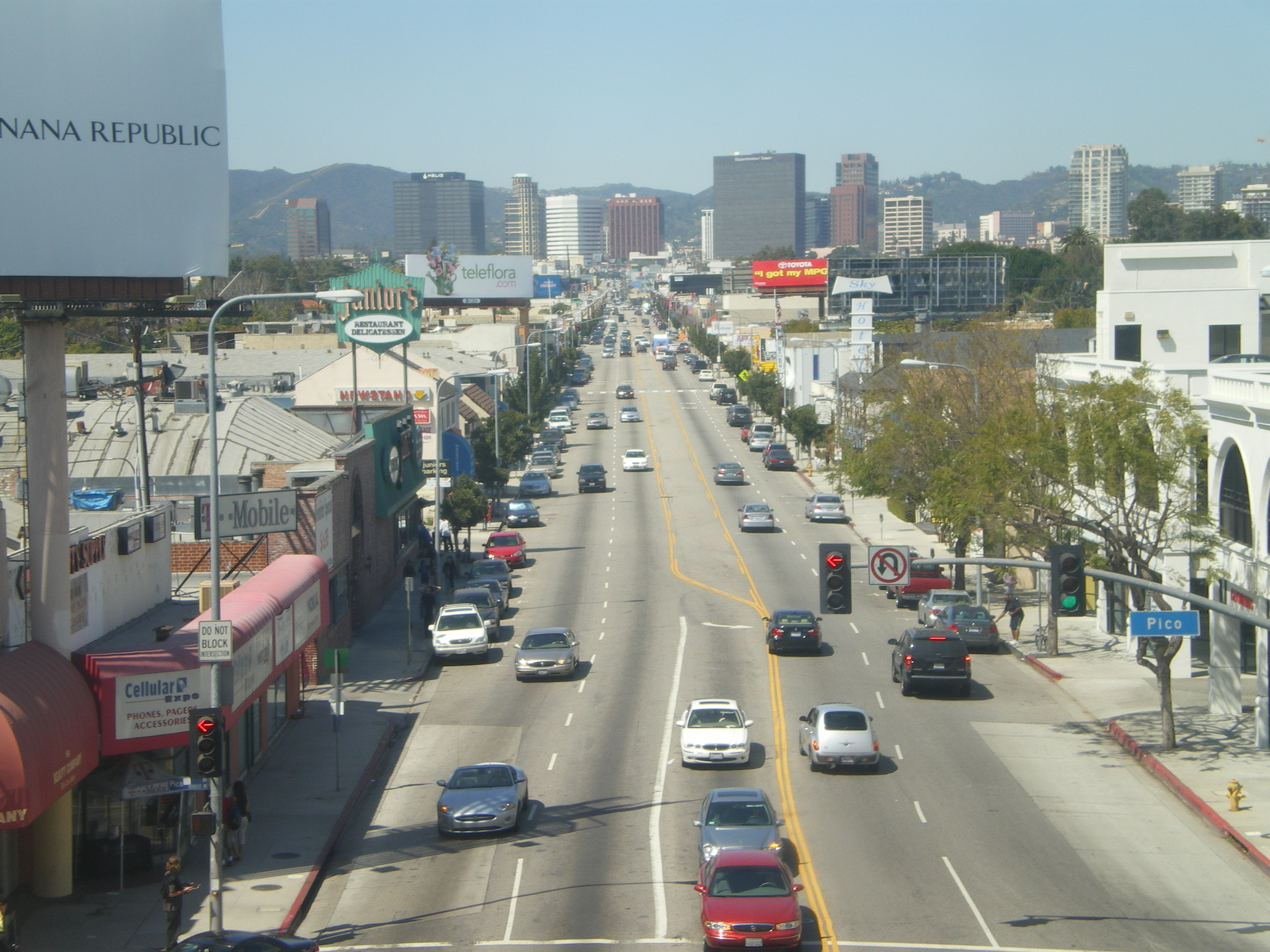
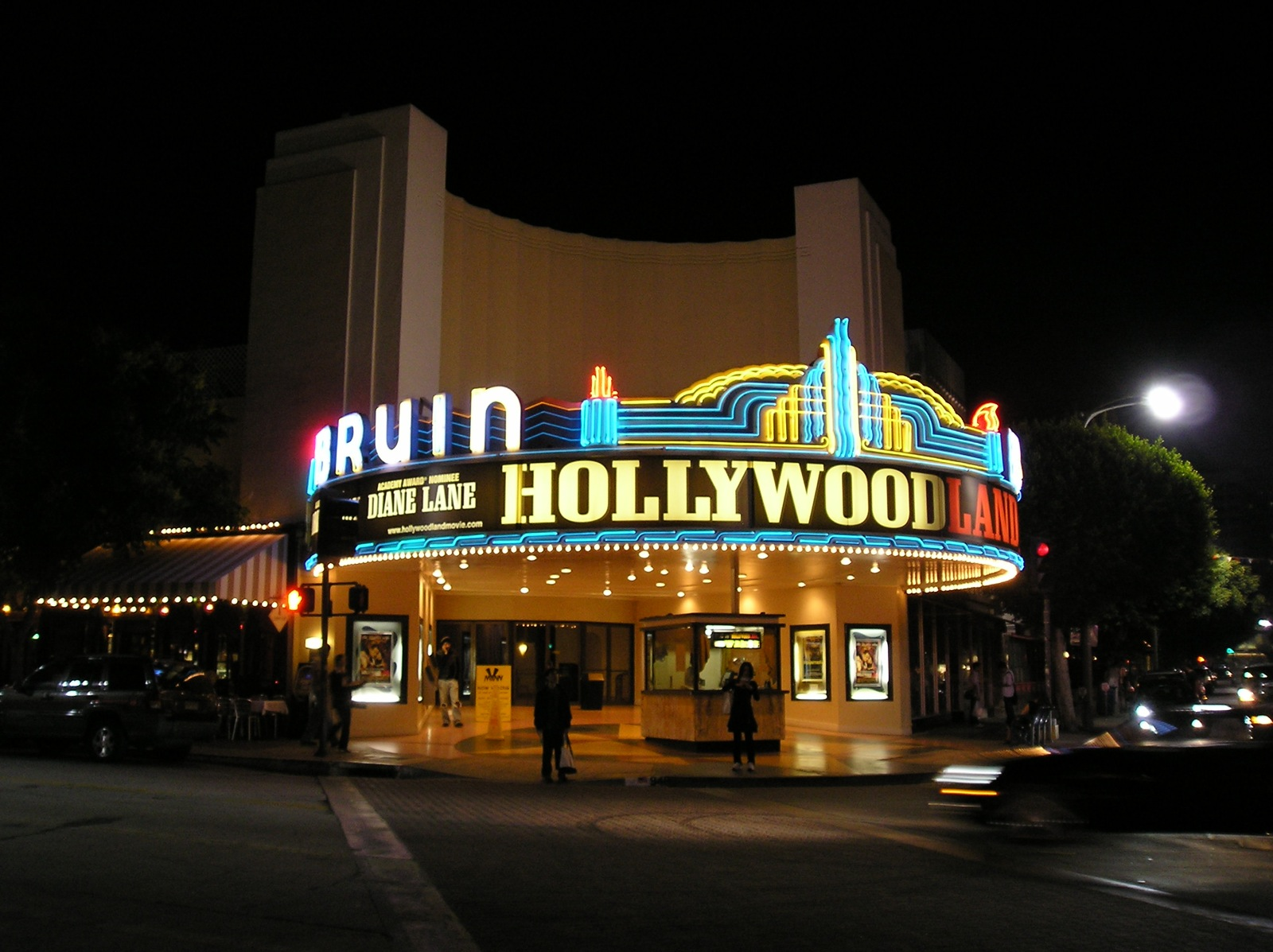
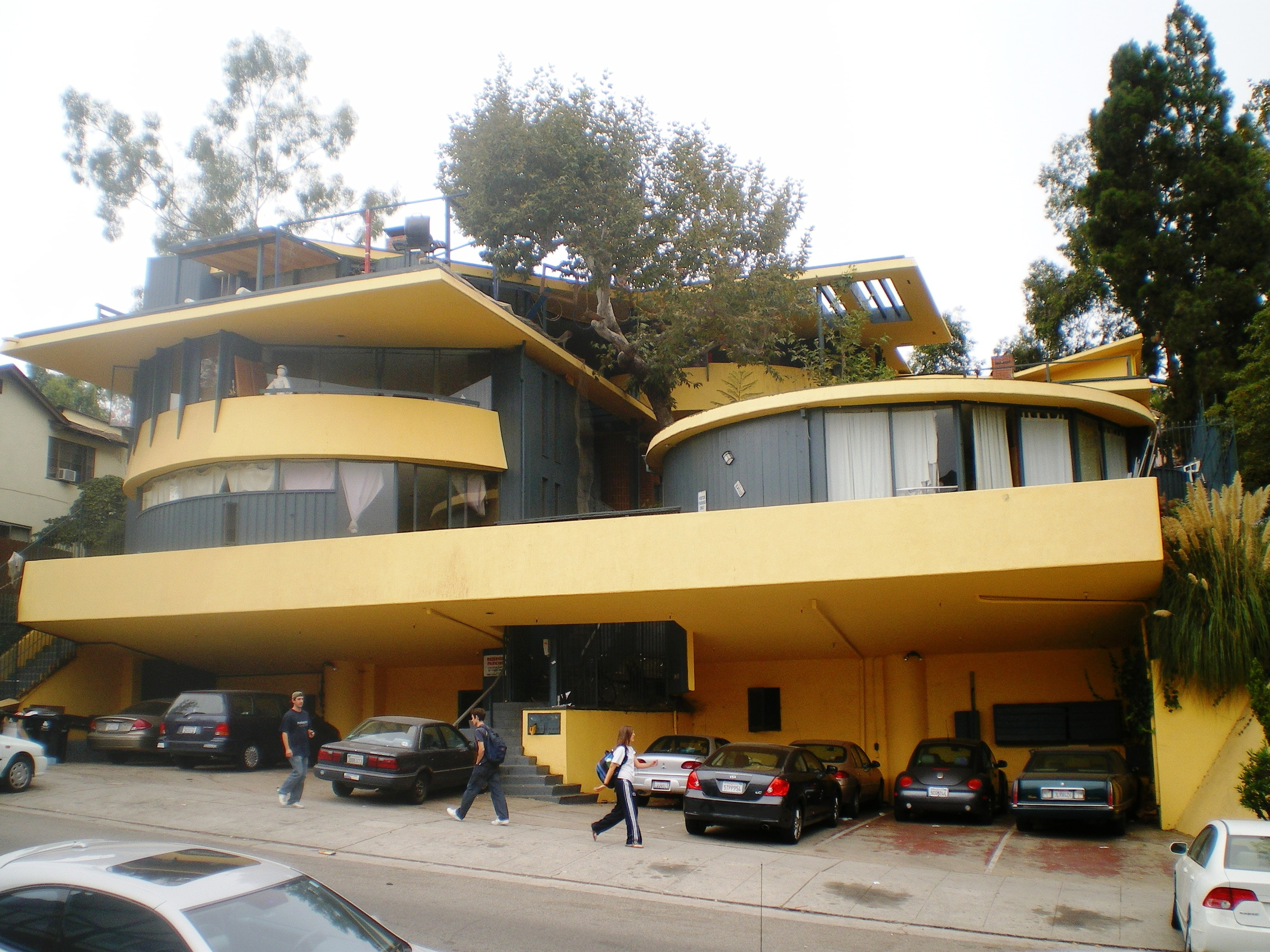
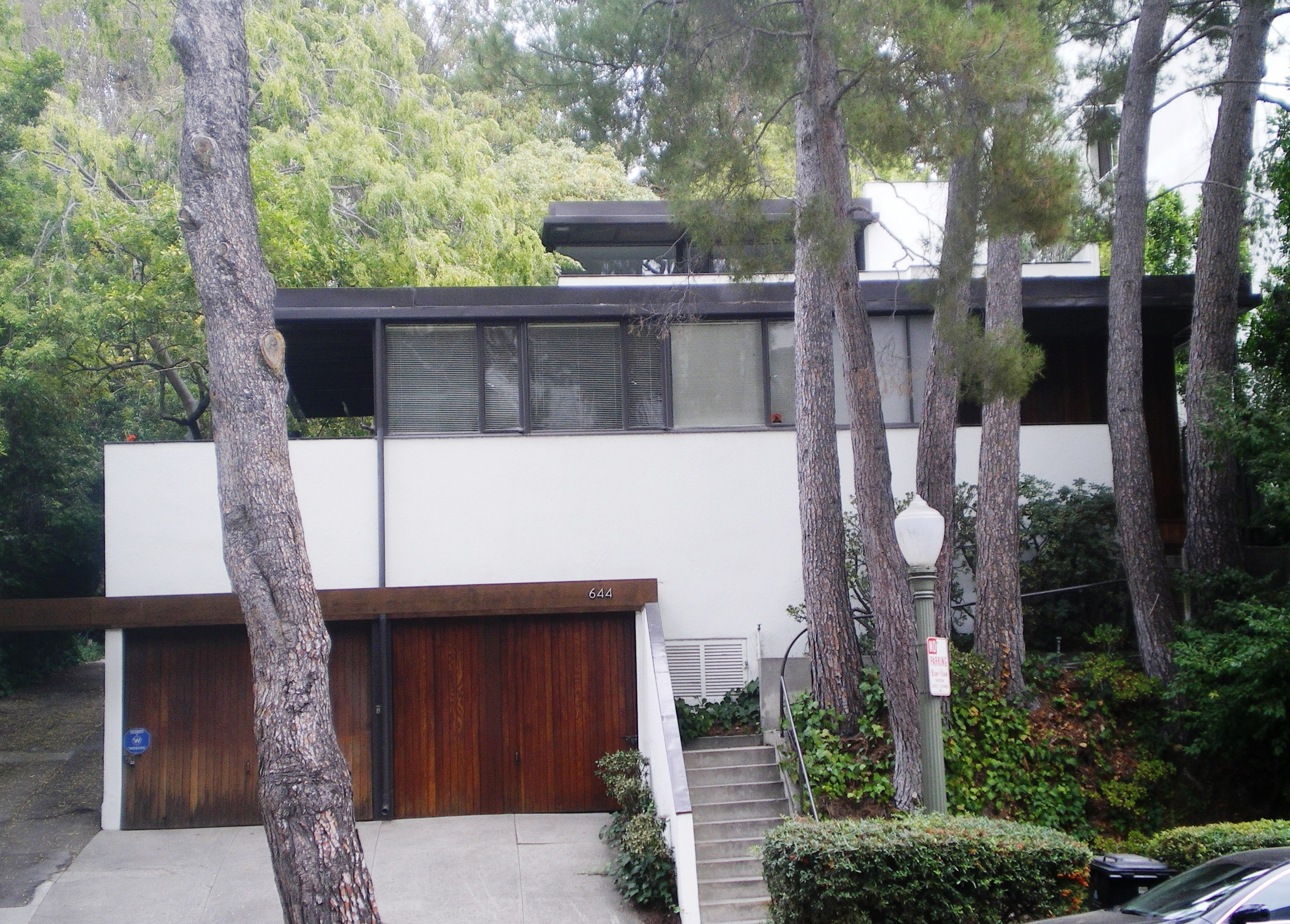
- Top: Westwood Boulevard; Fox Bruin Theater; bottom: Sheats Apartments; Kelton Apartments.

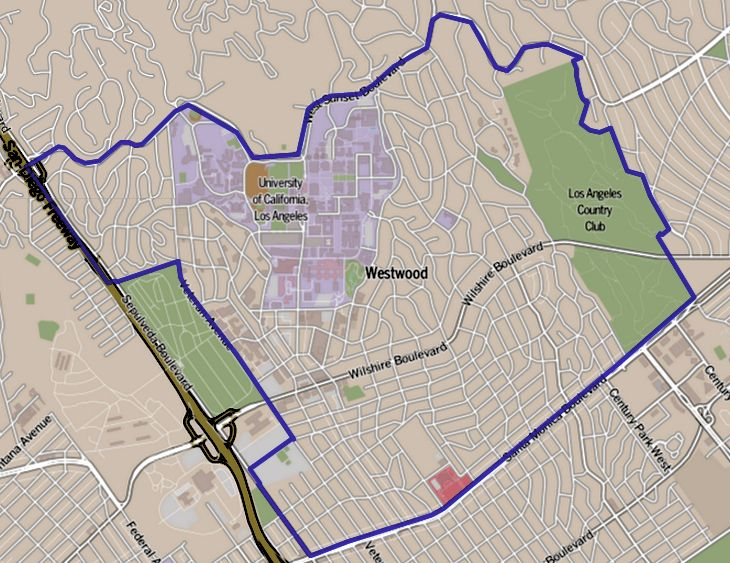
- Westwood neighborhood as delineated by the Los Angeles Times. LDS (Mormon) Temple in red.

- Location within Western Los Angeles
- Coordinates: 34.05611°N 118.42972°W
- Country: United States
- State: California
- County: Los Angeles
- City: Los Angeles
- Elevation: 338 ft (103 m)

Population (2018)
  - Total: 50,288
- Population of ZIP Code 90024, grossly corresponding to Westwood, American Community Survey, U.S. Census Bureau, 2018
- Time zone: UTC−8 (PST)
  - Summer (DST): UTC−7 (PDT)
- ZIP Codes: 90024, 90025, 90049
- Area codes: 310/424

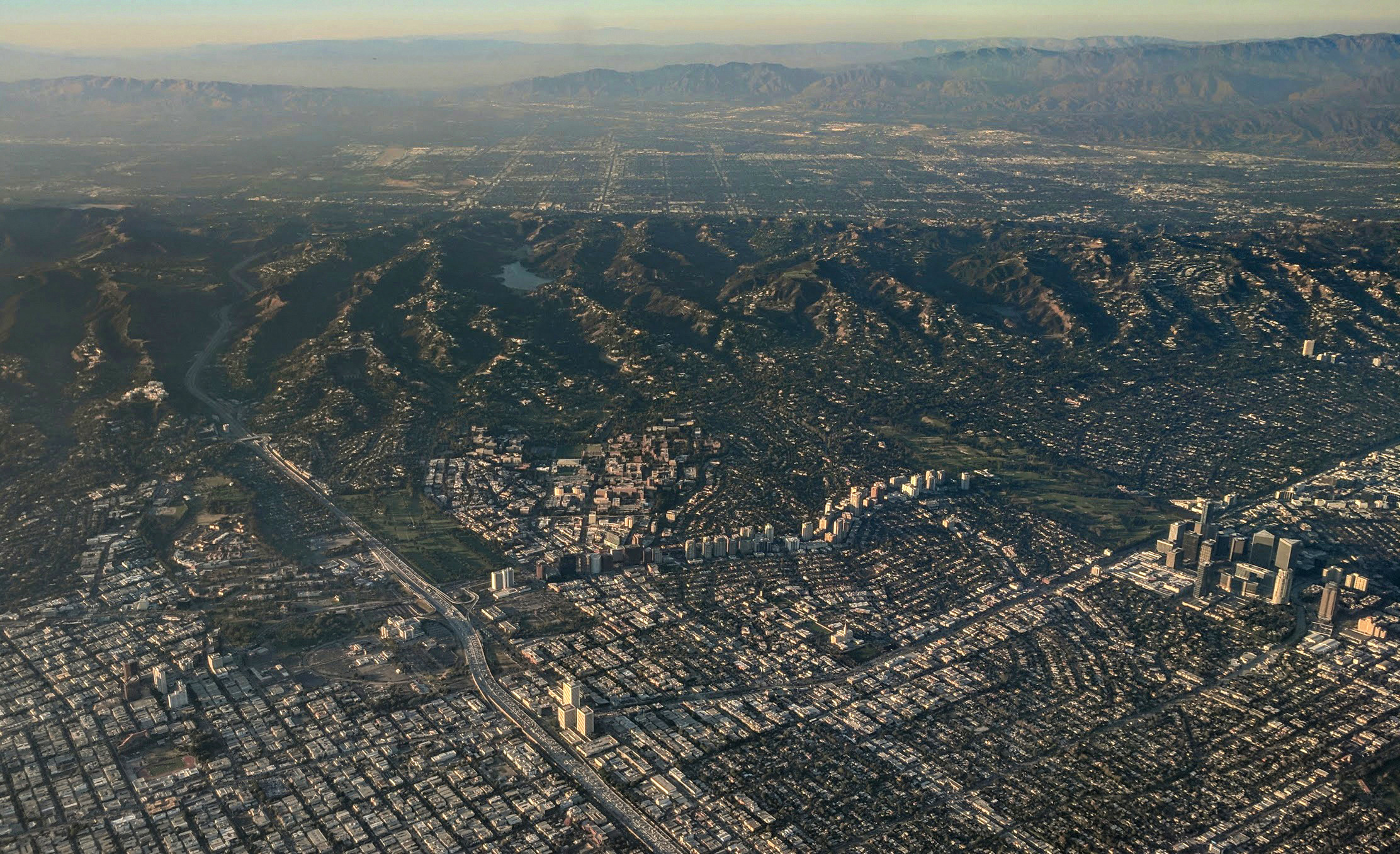
Late afternoon aerial photograph of Westwood (center), with Century City at the far right and the Santa Monica Mountains and San Fernando Valley in the background

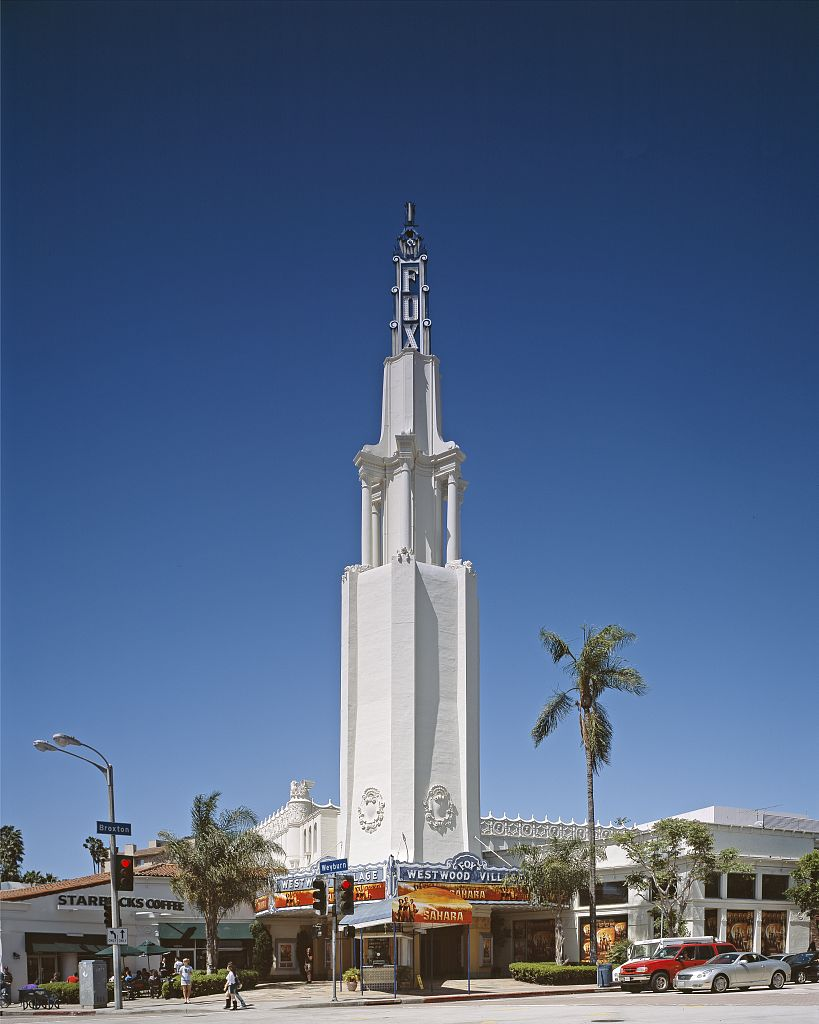
Fox Village Theatre with iconic tower

Westwood is a commercial and residential neighborhood in the northern central portion of the Westside region of the city of Los Angeles, California. It is the home of the University of California, Los Angeles (UCLA). Bordering the campus on the south is Westwood Village, a major regional district for shopping, dining, movie theaters, and other entertainment.

Wilshire Boulevard through Westwood is a major corridor of condominium towers, on the eastern end and of Class A office towers, on the western end. Westwood also has residential areas of multifamily and single family housing, including exclusive Holmby Hills. The neighborhood was developed starting in 1919, and UCLA opened in 1929, while Westwood Village was built up starting in 1929 through the 1930s.

== Geography ==
According to the Westwood Neighborhood Council, the Westwood Homeowners Association, and the Los Angeles Times Mapping L.A. project, Westwood is bounded by:

Direction	Boundary	Adjacent neighborhood(s)
North	Sunset Boulevard	Bel Air
East	Beverly Hills city limits incl. L.A. Country Club	City of Beverly Hills
South	Santa Monica Boulevard	West Los Angeles; Century City
West	Sepulveda Boulevard or I-405*	Sawtelle Veterans Home; Brentwood
*VA grounds east of Sepulveda/I-405 are not included

=== Sub-neighborhoods ===
Westwood Village street scene in 2005

Westwood Village is immediately south of the UCLA campus, bounded by LeConte, Gayley, Thornton (between Lindbrook and Wilshire: Glendon) and Wilshire Boulevard. Westwood Village north of Wilshire is an on-street shopping, dining and entertainment district that was planned in the 1920s - the second such district ever to be built in the nation's history. It was planned by Janss and businesses started to open in 1929. It was the Westside's busiest such district through the 1980s.

A portion of Holmby Hills, home to the Playboy Mansion, south of Sunset Blvd., east of both Beverly Glen Bl. and Comstock Av., and west of the L.A. Country Club, is within Westwood. The northern section of Holmby Hills is part of Bel Air. Together, Holmby Hills, Bel Air and Beverly Hills form the "Platinum Triangle" of Los Angeles.

North Westwood Village (or North Village) consists mainly of multifamily residential units where many UCLA students live, west of Gayley, north of Weyburn, and east of Veteran aves.

Tehrangeles, also known as "Little Persia", refers to the large number of Persian restaurants, grocery stores, bookstores, art galleries, travel agencies, and rug stores along Westwood Boulevard that has served as a cultural hub for the Persian community in Los Angeles since the 1960s.

=== Climate ===
Westwood has a Mediterranean climate (Köppen Csb) with dry summers, relatively wet winters, and mild temperatures year-round. Like the rest of coastal Los Angeles County, Westwood experiences an Indian summer, where its warmest highs, in the upper 70s, are towards the end of summer and early fall. After mid-October temperatures dip down quicker as the cold season approaches, then they rise from late spring to summer. Ocean temperatures tend to moderate the climate more than inland locations.

The average precipitation in Westwood is 17.43 inches which tends to be higher than most populated places in LA County. This is due to its proximity to the ocean andhillside location resulting in heavier and abundant rainfall. The most rainfall in a wet season was 43.55 from September 1997 to June 1998.

Climate data for UCLA, 1991–2020 normals, extremes 1933–present
Month	Jan	Feb	Mar	Apr	May	Jun	Jul	Aug	Sep	Oct	Nov	Dec	Year
Record high °F (°C)	91 (33)	91 (33)	94 (34)	103 (39)	97 (36)	102 (39)	106 (41)	99 (37)	109 (43)	103 (39)	99 (37)	94 (34)	109 (43)
Mean maximum °F (°C)	82.4 (28.0)	81.9 (27.7)	83.3 (28.5)	86.0 (30.0)	84.1 (28.9)	84.0 (28.9)	87.9 (31.1)	89.8 (32.1)	94.9 (34.9)	92.6 (33.7)	87.8 (31.0)	80.3 (26.8)	97.4 (36.3)
Mean daily maximum °F (°C)	67.7 (19.8)	67.0 (19.4)	68.0 (20.0)	69.6 (20.9)	70.2 (21.2)	72.9 (22.7)	76.9 (24.9)	78.8 (26.0)	78.7 (25.9)	76.2 (24.6)	72.1 (22.3)	67.1 (19.5)	72.1 (22.3)
Daily mean °F (°C)	59.8 (15.4)	59.1 (15.1)	60.0 (15.6)	61.6 (16.4)	63.2 (17.3)	66.9 (19.4)	69.6 (20.9)	71.0 (21.7)	70.6 (21.4)	67.9 (19.9)	63.7 (17.6)	59.3 (15.2)	64.3 (17.9)
Mean daily minimum °F (°C)	51.9 (11.1)	51.1 (10.6)	52.1 (11.2)	53.6 (12.0)	56.3 (13.5)	59.1 (15.1)	62.4 (16.9)	63.1 (17.3)	62.5 (16.9)	59.6 (15.3)	55.4 (13.0)	51.4 (10.8)	56.5 (13.6)
Mean minimum °F (°C)	42.9 (6.1)	43.0 (6.1)	44.4 (6.9)	46.6 (8.1)	50.8 (10.4)	54.2 (12.3)	57.7 (14.3)	58.3 (14.6)	56.6 (13.7)	53.0 (11.7)	47.3 (8.5)	43.4 (6.3)	40.8 (4.9)
Record low °F (°C)	30 (−1)	33 (1)	34 (1)	37 (3)	43 (6)	44 (7)	51 (11)	50 (10)	47 (8)	40 (4)	33 (1)	25 (−4)	25 (−4)
Average precipitation inches (mm)	4.14 (105)	4.73 (120)	2.73 (69)	0.77 (20)	0.42 (11)	0.11 (2.8)	0.03 (0.76)	0.01 (0.25)	0.15 (3.8)	0.72 (18)	0.99 (25)	2.93 (74)	17.73 (450)
Average precipitation days (≥ 0.01 in)	6.3	6.5	5.1	2.5	1.7	0.9	0.6	0.2	0.5	2.3	3.1	5.3	35.0
Source: NOAA

== History ==
The area was originally founded to care for soldiers of the Civil War and the Indian Wars.

=== Development ===
Westwood was developed on the lands of the historic Wolfskill Ranch, a 3,000-acre (12 km^{2}) parcel that Arthur Letts, the successful founder of the Broadway and Bullock's department stores, purchased in 1919. Upon Arthur Letts' death, his son-in-law, Harold Janss, vice president of Janss Investment Company, inherited the land. He began to develop the area and started to advertise for new homes in 1922.

The Los Angeles Times on October 29, 1922 reported the news: "Westwood, the subdivision of the Wolfskill Ranch, 3,300 acres (13 km^{2}) of scenic territory between the city and Santa Monica, is to be opened to homeseekers and investors today by the Janss Investment Company. The tract comprises approximately 1000 residential and business lots, situated west of the Los Angeles Country Club on Santa Monica Boulevard and the Rancho Country Club on Pico Boulevard."

=== University of California, Los Angeles ===
Meanwhile, the Southern Branch of the University of California had been established on Vermont Avenue in Los Angeles, where enrollment expanded so rapidly that by 1925 the institution had outgrown the site. The selection of a new campus in the Westwood hills was announced on March 21, 1925. The owners of the estate, the Janss brothers, agreed to sell the property for approximately $1 million ($14 million in 2024 dollars), less than one-third the land's value. Municipal bond measures passed by Los Angeles, Santa Monica, Beverly Hills and Venice provided for that amount. Proposition 10, a state bond measure passed that year, provided $3 million for construction. Thus the University of California at Los Angeles was established in Westwood; ground was broken on September 12, 1927, and the campus opened for regular classes on September 20, 1929.

=== Westwood Village ===
Westwood Village, a planned, 55-acre suburban shopping district (22 ha) immediately south of the UCLA campus, was only the second such district on this scale ever to be built worldwide, preceded only by Country Club Plaza (1922–23) in Kansas City. It with was created by the Janss Investment Company, run by Harold and Edwin Janss and their father, Peter, in the late 1920s as a shopping district and headquarters of the Janss Company. Its boom was complemented by the boom of UCLA which opened in 1929 and served not only faculty, staff and students but also affluent shoppers from the surrounding upscale single-family-home neighborhoods.

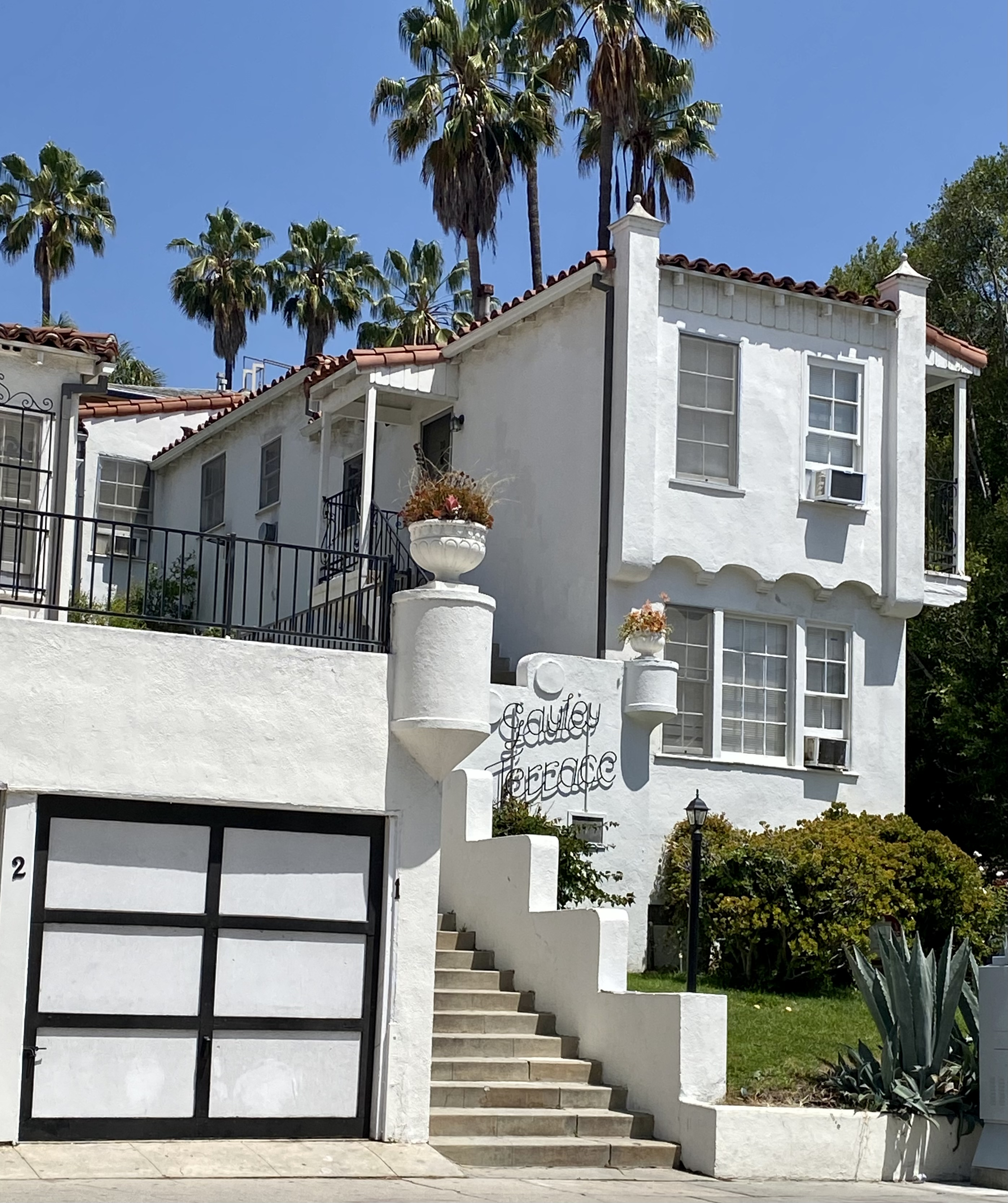
Gayley Terrace apartments (LAHCM No. 363), built in 1940

Opening in 1929, the design was considered one of the nation's best-planned and beautifully laid out commercial areas. Harold Janss had hired major architects and instructed them to follow a Mediterranean theme, with clay tile roofs, decorative Spanish tile, paseos, patios and courtyards. Buildings at strategic points, including theaters, used towers to serve as beacons for drivers on Wilshire Boulevard. Janss picked the first slate of businesses and determined their location in the neighborhood; the area opened with 34 businesses, and, despite the Great Depression, had 452 businesses in 1939, including Bullock's (Parkinson & Parkinson), Desmond's (Percy Parke Lewis) and Sears department stores, and a Ralphs grocery (Stiles Clements).

=== 1970s–1980s ===
The architectural style met a turning point in 1970, when a 24-story office building now known as the Oppenheimer Tower was built in the neighborhood and the design of new buildings soon became a blend of styles. The Oppenheimer Tower was used for the primary location in the 1978 episode of Emergency!, "The Steel Inferno". Wilshire Boulevard through Westwood would become a major corridor of condominium towers, from Westwood Boulevard east towards the Beverly Hills city line, and of Class A office towers, at Westwood Boulevard and westward. The 1980s saw Iranian immigration to the area after the 1979 Iranian Revolution, and the beginnings of the Tehrangeles business corridor along Westwood Boulevard south of Wilshire Boulevard. Westwood Village's popularity as a shopping, dining, and nighttime entertainment district continued to rise, with commercial rents peaking in 1988.

=== 1984 and 2028 Summer Olympics ===
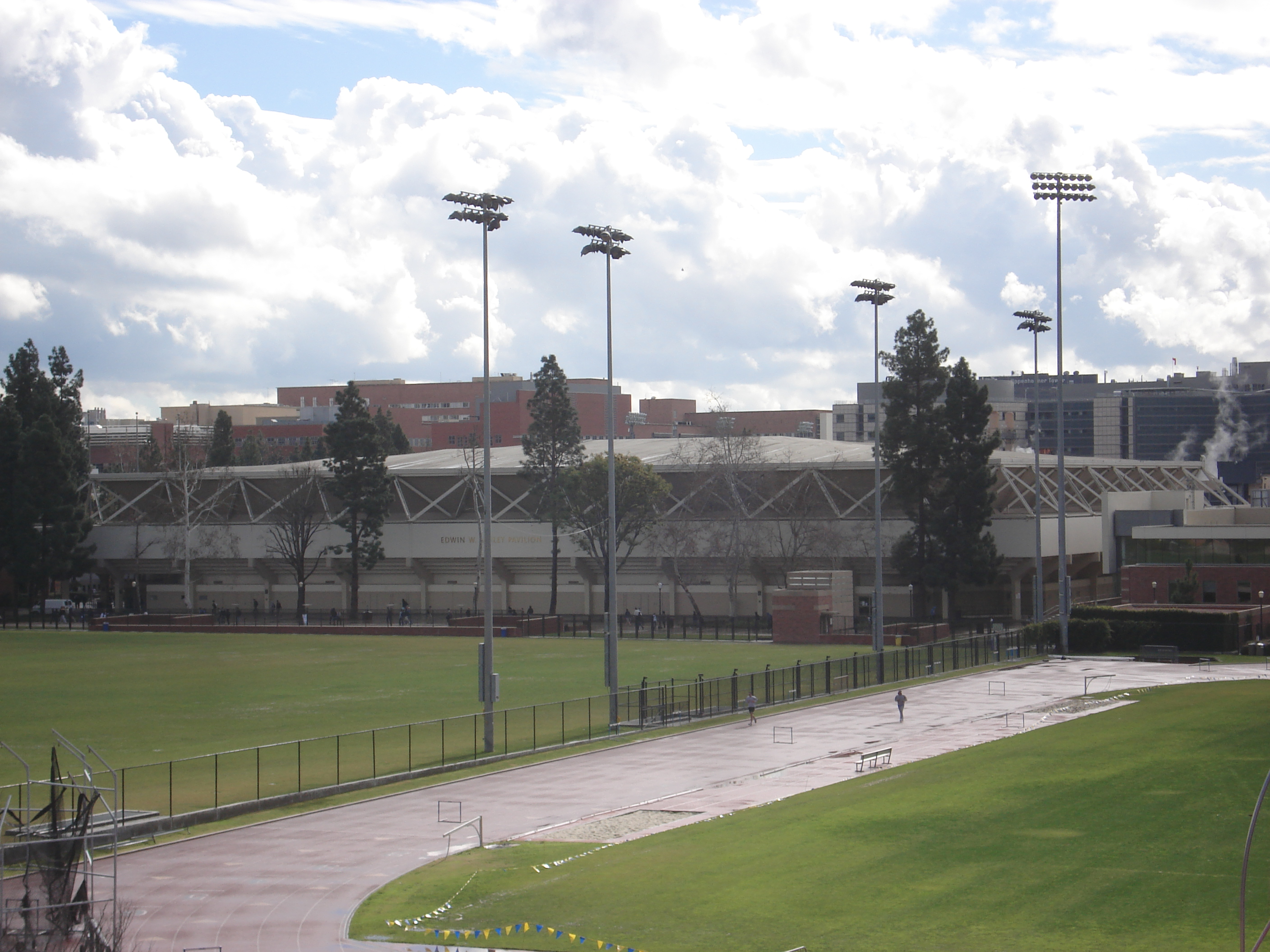
The exterior of Pauley Pavilion as seen in 2008.

When Los Angeles hosted the 1984 Summer Olympics, the UCLA dorms in Westwood served as the Olympic village. It will serve as the Olympic and Paralympic village when Los Angeles hosts the 2028 Summer Olympics.

During the 1984 Summer Olympics, Pauley Pavilion hosted the artistic gymnastics competition, while the Los Angeles Tennis Center hosted the tennis competition.

The Los Angeles Organizing Committee for the 2028 Olympic and Paralympic Games was headquarter in Westwood at 10900 Wilshire Boulevard in Westwood from its formation up until 2025 when they moved to the USC Tower in Downtown Los Angeles.

=== Decline of Westwood Village ===
The Village suffered a major setback in the late 1980s, when gangs began to frequent the neighborhood and crime increased. The problems culminated in January 1988 when a gang shootout resulted in the death of a 27-year-old bystander. On January 30, 1988, gang violence brought nationwide attention to Westwood Village when Karen Toshima, a 27-year-old graphics artist, was killed as she crossed a Village street in a shootout between gang members. Her killer, Durrell DeWitt Collins, 23, was sentenced to two concurrent terms of 27 years to life in prison. In 2016, he was again denied parole until at least 2021. This episode led to the widespread impression that even affluent Westwood was not immune to the crime wave then ravaging Los Angeles.

The Los Angeles establishment reacted with horror. Newspapers and television headlined the story for days.
Police patrols in Westwood tripled, and the L.A.P.D. assigned a 30-member antigang unit to capture Toshima's killer.
— "The Price of Life in Los Angeles: Is one killing in Westwood worse than hundreds in the ghetto?", Margaret Carlson, Time magazine, February 22, 1988

There was a conviction in December 1988 for a September 1985 abduction and double-murder that started as an auto theft in Westwood.

The neighborhood's well-known bookstores and some movie cinemas began closing with the advent of large chain stores, Amazon.com and multiplex theaters.

=== Current challenges ===
A 2014 report for the Westwood Village Improvement Association reported that Westwood Village, although still a busy place, was no longer the Westside's dominant retail and entertainment destinations as it had been for decades. The Village suffered from deteriorating public spaces and a high number of vacancies. Multiple revitalization efforts over decades were unsuccessful and the Village's image and reputation suffered. Even a quarter century later, Los Angeles Magazine referred to the 1988 gang‐related murder of an innocent bystander as a cause of Westwood Village's diminished activity. Limited and expensive parking remained a problem. Macy's (originally Bullock's) closed in 1999, leaving the district without a department store anchor. In that quarter-century, multiple nearby districts lured customers away from the Village, such as Westfield Century City, The Grove, the now-closed Westside Pavilion, and Downtown Santa Monica with its open-air and enclosed shopping malls.

=== Architecture ===
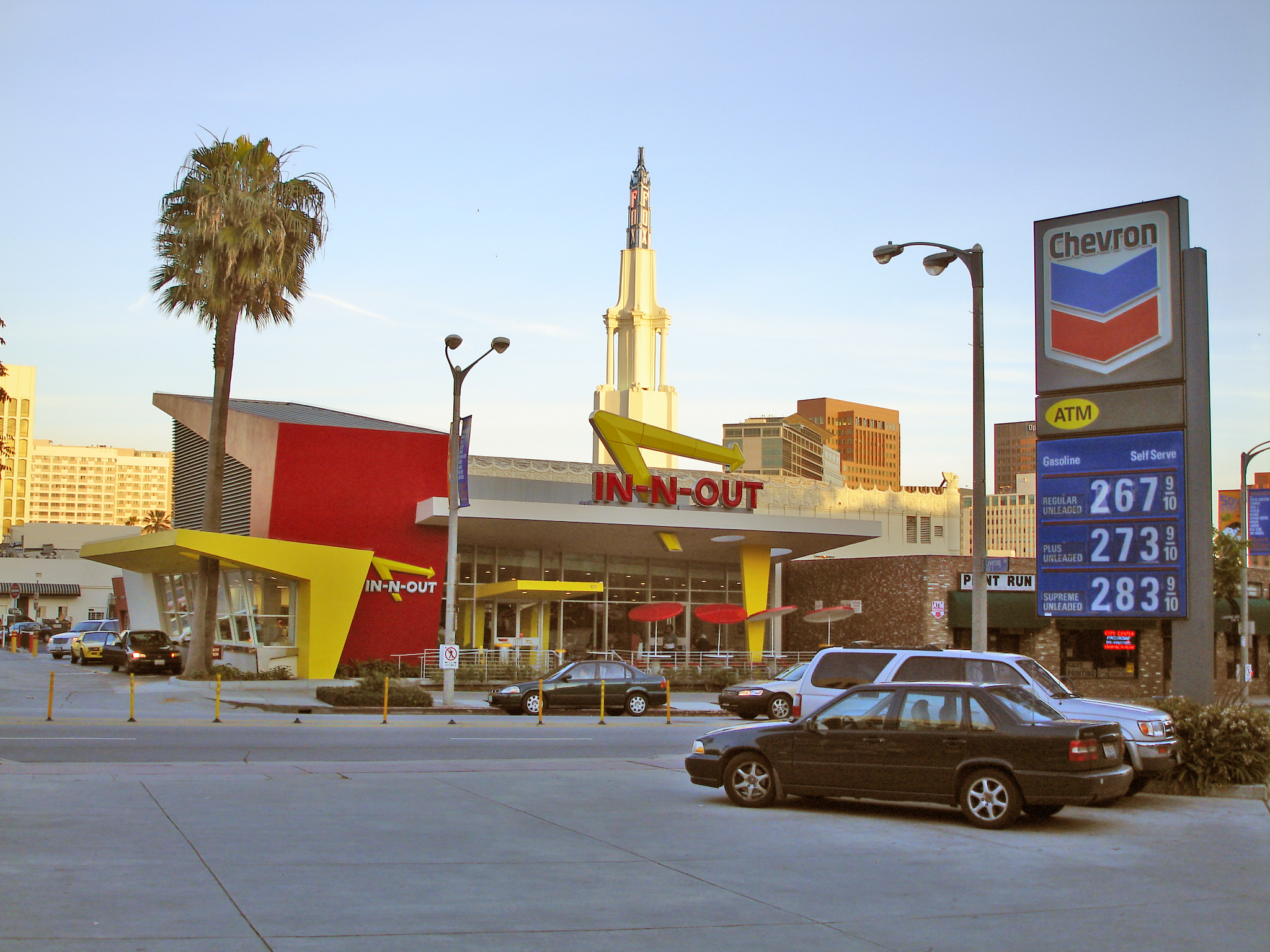
A Kanner Architects-designed In-N-Out Burger near the UCLA campus in Westwood.

Westwood Village was master-planned in the late 1920s and Janss carefully selected not only the architects, but also the style of the buildings and their juxtaposition. Towers were built as landmarks and businesses on corner lots were carefully selected for their attractiveness and as landmarks.

==== Table of architecturally significant buildings in Westwood Village ====
Buildings which according to a 1985 study by Gruen and Associates identified the following buildings of historic architectural significance:

Original occupant/ building name	Current occupant	Location	Year	Architect
Fox Bruin Theater	same	926-40 Broxton	1937	S. Charles Lee
Fox Westwood Village Theatre	same	925 Broxton	1931	Percy Parke Lewis
University Professional Building	Primo Driving Schools, et al.	1091-3 Broxton	1929	G. K. Harrison
Masonic Clubhouse	Geffen Playhouse Theater	10886 LeConte	1929	Morgan, Walls & Clements
Holmby Hall	Amazon store et al.	901-51 Westwood Bl.	1929	Gordon Kaufmann
Kelly Music Co.	Tanino Ristorante Bar	1043 Westwood Bl.	1929	Paul R. Williams
Janss Investment Co. Bldg.	Broxton Brewery et al.	1045-1099 Westwood Bl.	1929	Allison & Allison
Ralph's Market	Alfred Coffee, et al.	1142-54 Westwood Bl.	1929	Russell Collins
Bullock's Westwood	Target	10861 Weyburn	1951	Welton Becket

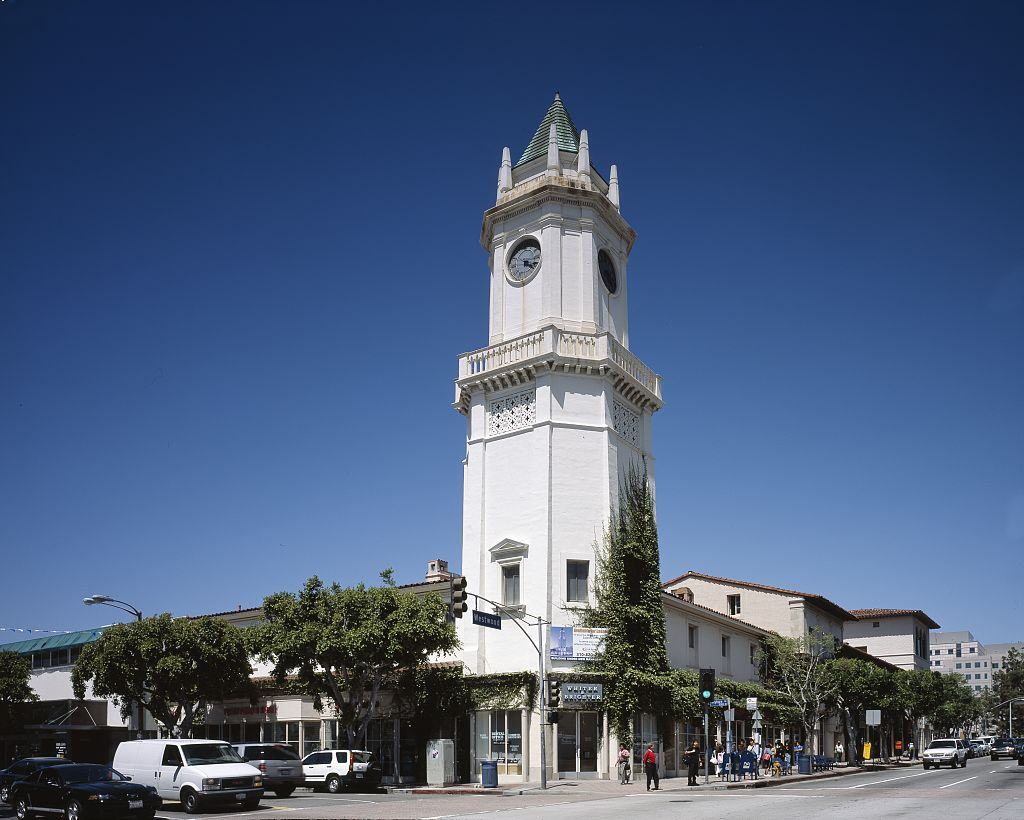
Holmby Hall, 1929, Gordon Kaufmann, architect

== Demographics ==
In 2018, about 50,288 people lived in the 90024 ZIP code, which grossly corresponds to Westwood, according to the Census Bureau's American Community Survey. The 2000 U.S. census counted 47,916 residents in the 3.68-square-mile Westwood neighborhood—or 13,036 people per square mile, an average population density for the city. In 2008, the city estimated that the population had increased to 52,041. The median age for residents was 27, considered young for the city; the percentages of residents aged 19 to 34 was among the county's highest.

The neighborhood was considered moderately diverse ethnically, with a high percentage of Asians and of whites. The breakdown was 62.9% Non-Hispanic White, 23.1% Asian, 7.0% Hispanic or Latino, 2.0% Black, and 4.9% of other origins. Iran (23.5%) and Taiwan (7.3%) were the most common places of birth for the 31.3% of the residents who were born abroad—about the same percentage as in the city at large.

The median yearly household income in 2008 dollars was $68,716, a high figure for Los Angeles. The percentages of households that earned $125,000 yearly and higher or that earned $20,000 or less were high for Los Angeles County. The average household size of two people was low for Los Angeles. Renters occupied 64.1% of the housing stock and house-or-apartment owners held 35.9%. The percentages of never-married men and women were among the county's highest. In 2000 there were 309 families headed by single parents, a low percentage for the city. Five percent of the population had served in the military, a low figure for both the city and the county.

== Entertainment and cultural facilities ==
Besides the many facilities of UCLA itself, cultural and entertainment facilities include:

=== Historic cinemas ===
The Village has two historic movie theaters Fox Village Theater (opened 1931, architect Percy Parke Lewis and the Bruin Theater (S. Charles Lee, 1937), which hosted many Hollywood premieres over past decades.

=== Hammer Museum ===
The Hammer Museum, which is affiliated with UCLA, is an art museum and cultural center known for its artist-centric and progressive array of exhibitions and public programs. Founded in 1990 by the entrepreneur-industrialist Armand Hammer to house his personal art collection, the museum has since expanded its scope to become "the hippest and most culturally relevant institution in town." Particularly important among the museum's critically acclaimed exhibitions are presentations of both historically overlooked and emerging contemporary artists. The Hammer Museum also hosts over 300 programs throughout the year, from lectures, symposia, and readings to concerts and film screenings. As of February 2014, the museum's collections, exhibitions, and programs are completely free to all visitors.

=== Geffen Playhouse Theater ===
The Geffen Playhouse Theater was built in 1929 at 10886 LeConte Avenue as the Masonic Affiliates Club, or the MAC, for students and alumni at UCLA. One of the first dozen structures built in Westwood Village, it was designed by architect Stiles O. Clements.

=== LDS (Mormon) Temple ===
The Los Angeles California Temple, the second-largest temple operated by The Church of Jesus Christ of Latter-day Saints, is on Santa Monica Boulevard in Westwood. The temple grounds also include a Visitors' Center open to the public and the headquarters for the Church's missionary efforts in Los Angeles. The church purchased the land for the temple from silent film star Harold Lloyd in 1937 and opened the temple in 1956.

The temple grounds are also home to the Los Angeles Regional Family History Center (LARFHC), which is open to the public as well. It is the second-largest branch in the Family History Library system of the LDS Church, and contains more than 100,000 microfiche and 30,000 books.

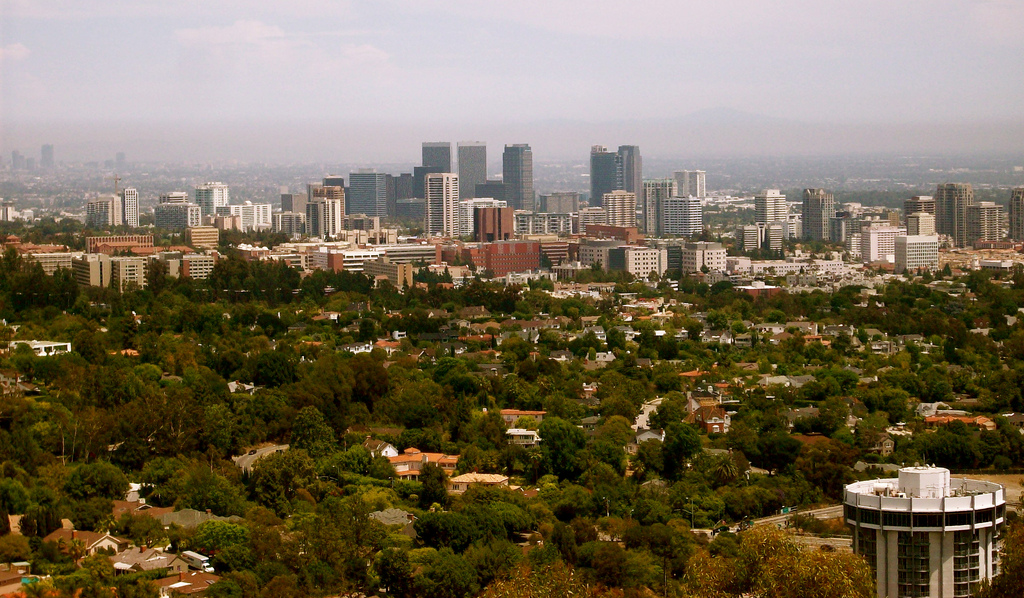
View of Westwood and surrounding areas, 2007

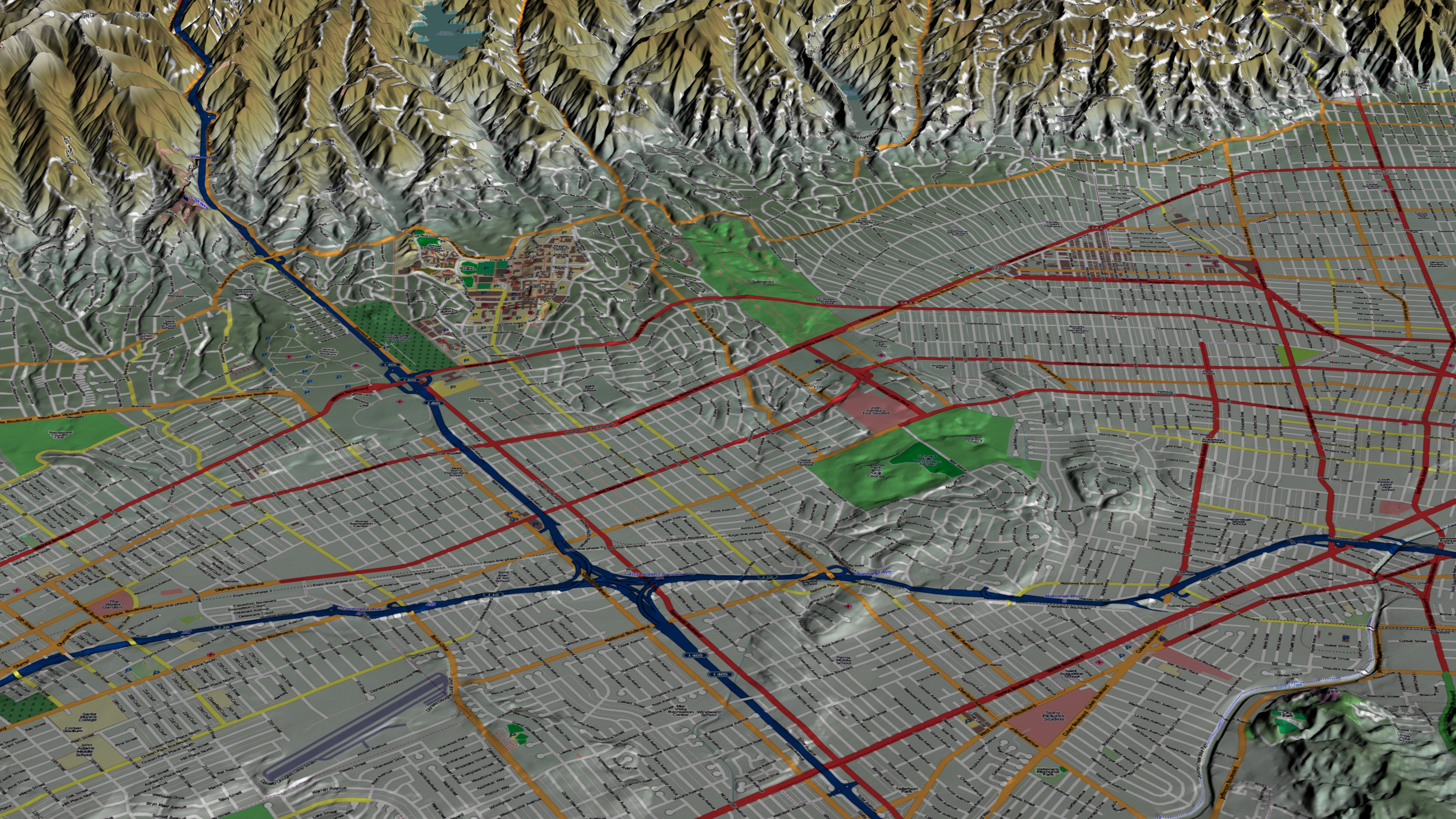
Aerial view of Westwood (center) and vicinity (3D computer generated image)

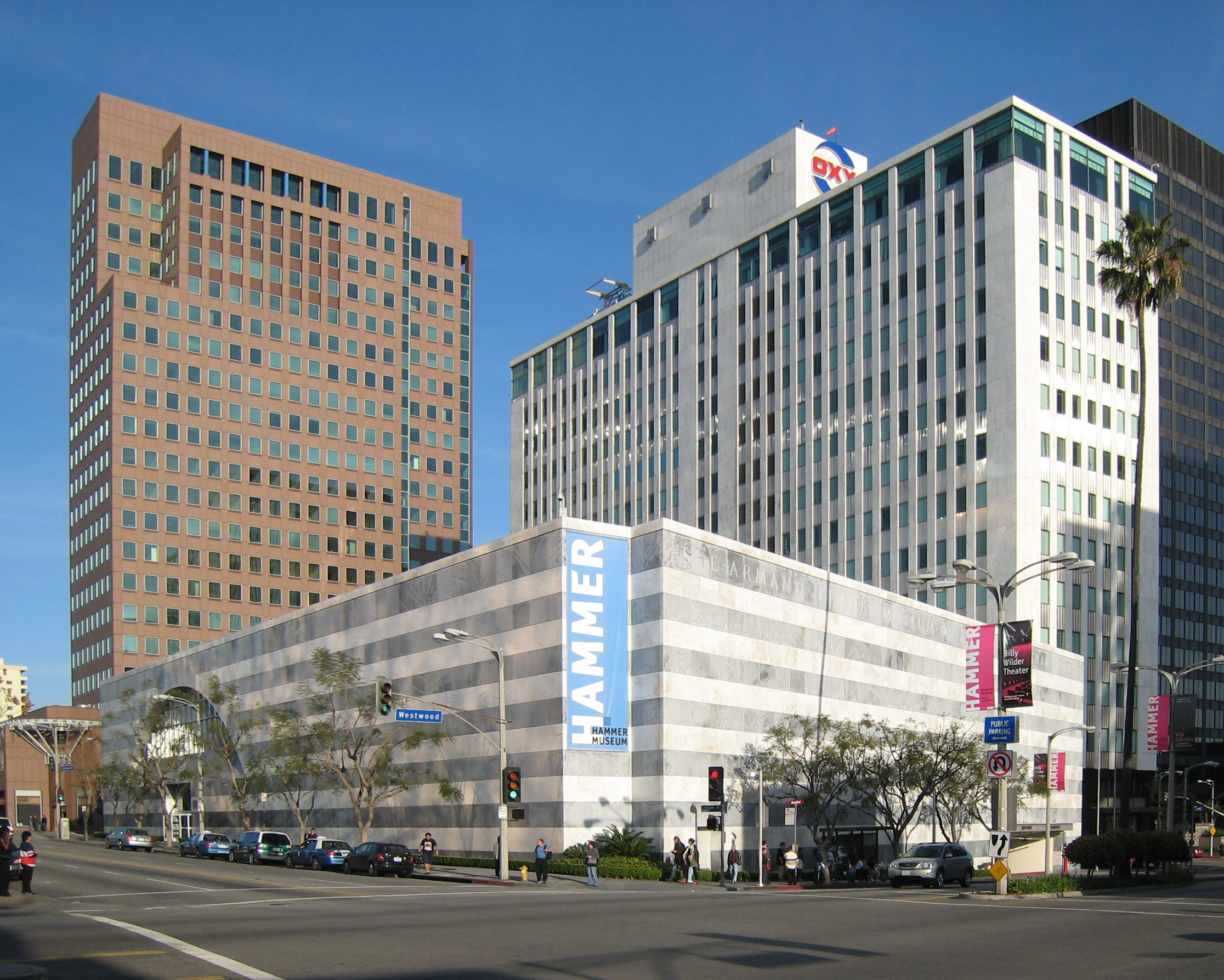
Hammer Museum, 2007

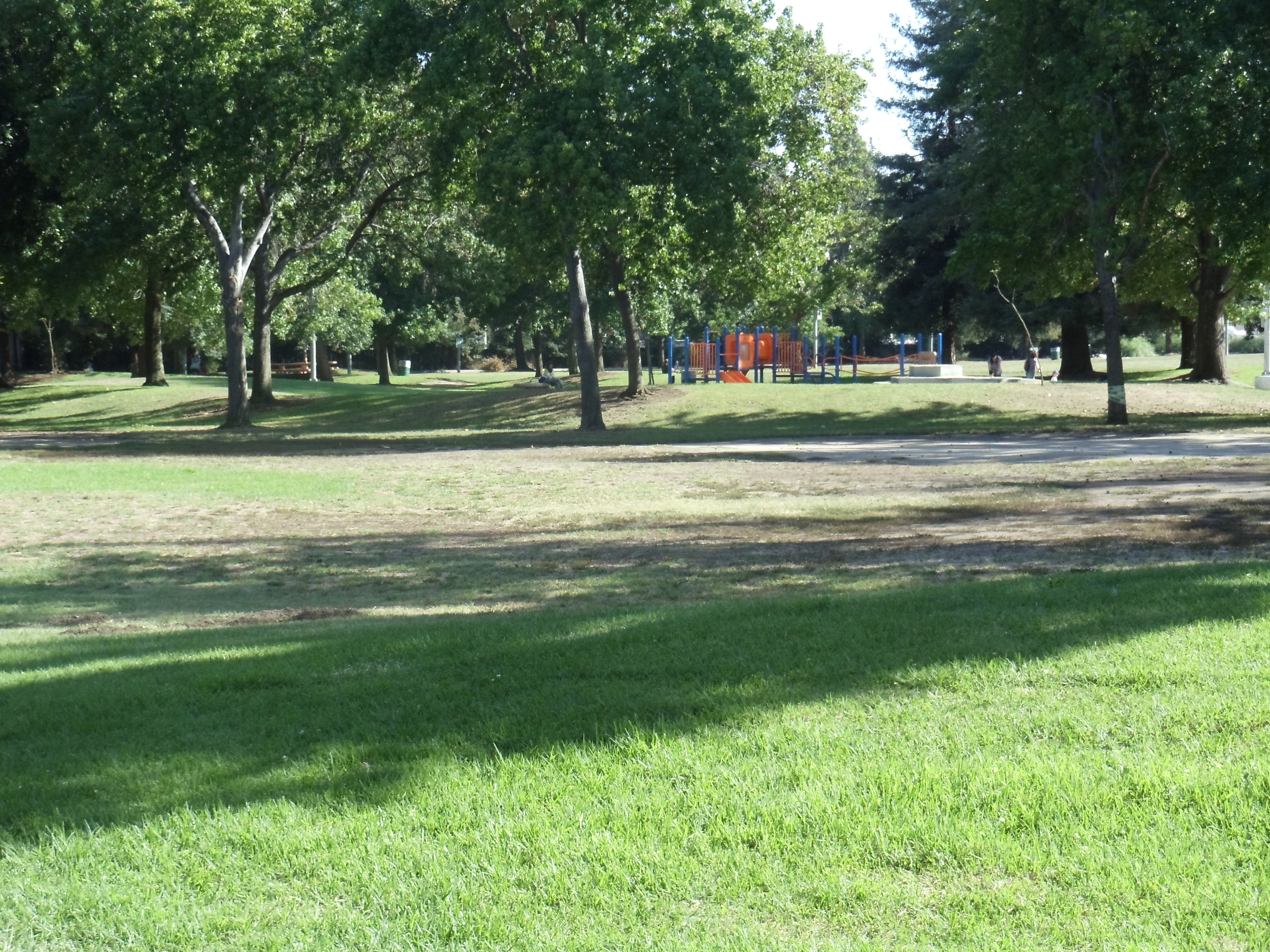
Westwood Park, 2012

== Parks and recreation ==
The Westwood Recreation Center is in Westwood. The facility includes barbecue pits, a lighted baseball diamond, lighted outdoor basketball courts, racquetball courts, a children's play area, a community room, an indoor gymnasium with weights, and a picnic table. The center also has Aidan's Place, which opened on December 5, 2001. The place, named after wheelchair-using Aidan James, is a playground developed for joint use by handicapped and non-handicapped children.

Holmby Park is also in Westwood.

== Government and infrastructure ==
The Los Angeles County Department of Health Services SPA 5 West Area Health Office serves Westwood.

In 2018, Westwood stakeholders voted to subdivide the area into two official neighborhood council districts. Since then the North Westwood Neighborhood Council has represented UCLA, Westwood Village, the North Westwood Village, and Persian Square areas, while the Westwood Neighborhood Council has continued to represent the surrounding residential areas.

=== Police ===
The Los Angeles Police Department operates the West Los Angeles Community Police Station at 1663 Butler Avenue, which serves the community. Law enforcement for the UCLA campus is the responsibility of the UCLA Police Department, a division of the independent, statewide University of California Police Department. As a state police agency, the UCLA PD has full law enforcement powers on and off campus.

=== Fire and EMS ===
Fire and emergency medical services are provided by the Los Angeles Fire Department. UCLA Emergency Medical Services, a division of the UCLA Police Department, operates a Basic Life Support ambulance for the UCLA campus and supports LAFD on medical aid calls in the surrounding community. UCLA also maintains a small fire suppression apparatus staffed by campus fire marshals that responds to university-owned properties and helps the outside community when requested to by LAFD.

=== Transportation ===
As part of Section 3 of the Metro D Line Extension, the brand new Westwood/UCLA station, located at the intersection of Wilshire and Westwood Boulevards, is planned to open in 2027.

== Education ==
Sixty-six percent of Westwood residents aged 25 and older had earned a four-year degree by 2000, a high figure for both the city and the county. The percentages of residents of that age with a master's degree or higher was the third-highest in the county.

Westwood is home to the University of California, Los Angeles (UCLA).

The Los Angeles Unified School District operates public schools. Schools in Westwood are

- Fairburn Avenue Elementary School, LAUSD, 1403 Fairburn Avenue
- Warner Avenue Elementary School, LAUSD, 615 Holmby Avenue
- Sinai Akiba Academy, private elementary, 10400 Wilshire Boulevard
- Saint Paul the Apostle, private elementary, 1536 Selby Avenue
- Ralph Waldo Emerson Middle School, LAUSD, 1660 Selby Avenue

The zoned senior high school is University High School in West Los Angeles.

UCLA Lab School Corinne A. Seeds Campus, formerly the Corinne A. Seeds University Elementary School and renamed in 2009, is the University of California, Los Angeles laboratory school.

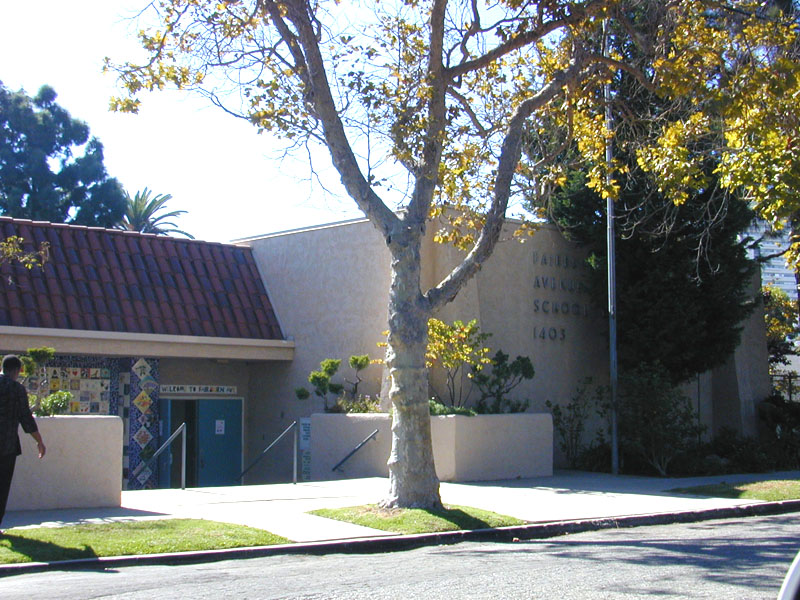
Fairburn Avenue School

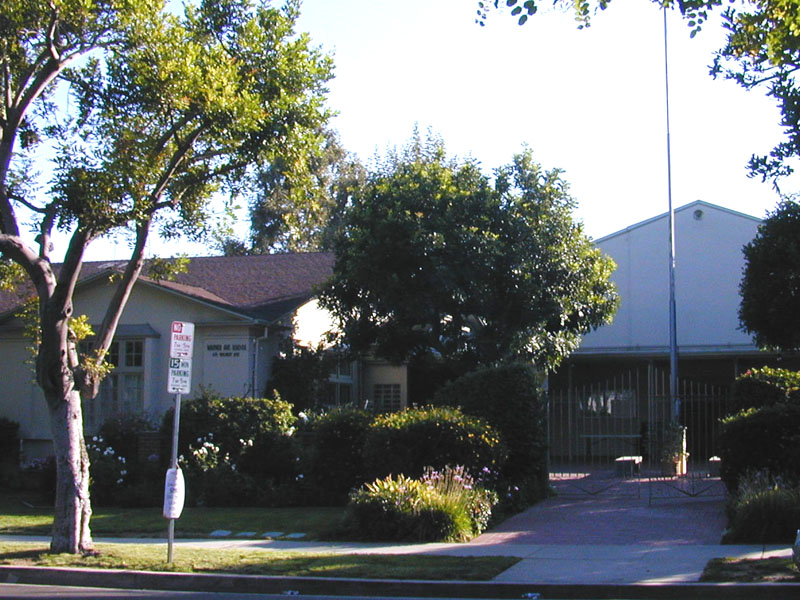
Warner Avenue School

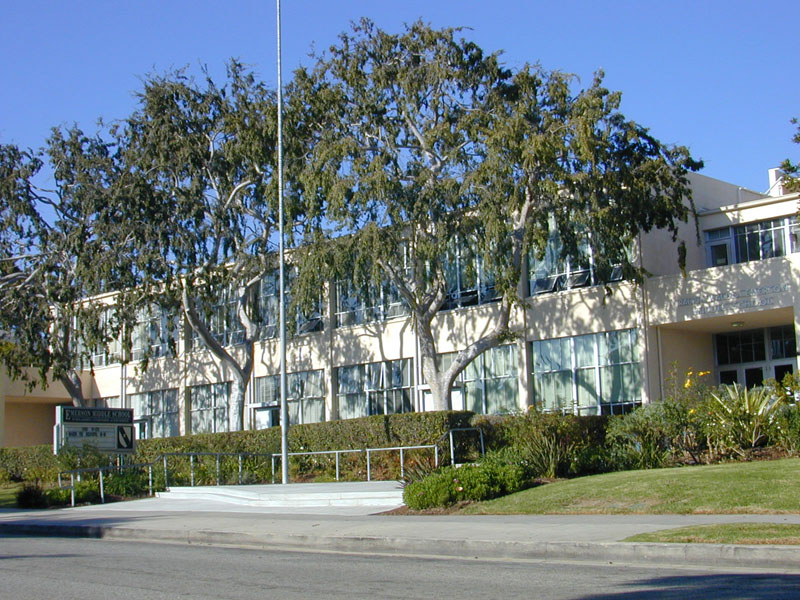
Emerson Middle School

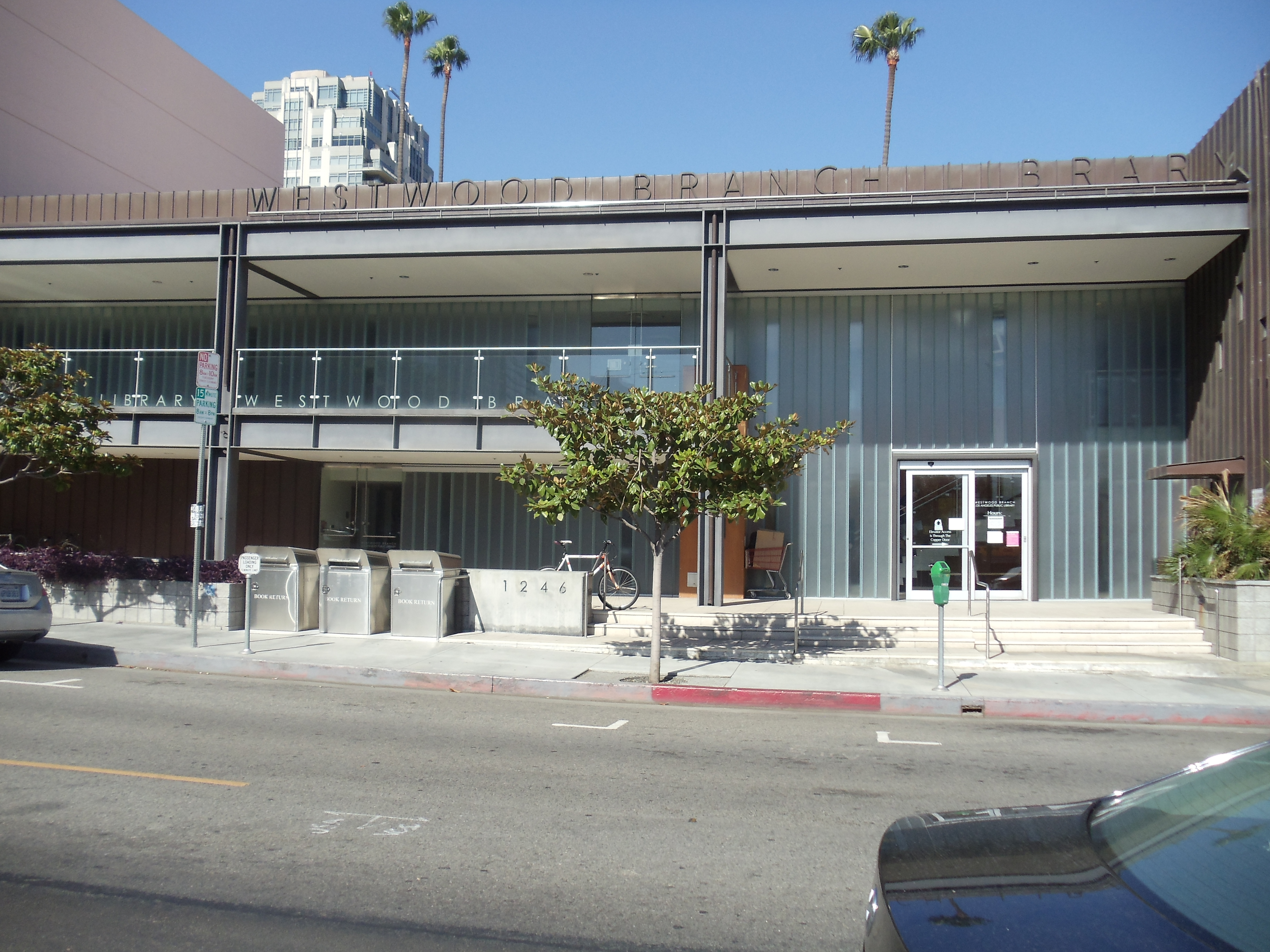
Westwood Branch Library

The Los Angeles Public Library opened a branch in Westwood in 2005.

== Notable people ==
- Andy Hill (born c. 1950), college basketball player, business executive and public speaker
- Bob Larson, radio, television evangelist, and pastor
- Emma Stone, actress
- Roozbeh Farahanipour, Iranian American, West Los Angeles Chamber of Commerce CEO, Business owner, Activist.
- Maya Rudolph, Actor, Singer and comedian, Saturday Night Live, Big Mouth, The Good Place.
