= California Institute for Immunology and Immunotherapy =

American nonprofit medical research organization

- Founded: 2021; 5 years ago
- Founders: Arie Belldegrun, Eric Esrailian, Gary Michelson, Owen Witte
- Location: Los Angeles, California, U.S.
- Fields: Biomedical Research Laboratories
- Key people: Board chair, Gary K. Michelson, president, Eric Esrailian
- Funding: Total revenue $20.0M in FY2025, $4.2 billion in state funding following the passage of California Proposition 38 in November 2026.
- Website: California Institute for Immunology and Immunotherapy

The California Institute for Immunology and Immunotherapy (CIII) is an American non-profit biomedical research organization with laboratories located in the University of California, Los Angeles Research Park.
