= Holmby Hall =

Building in Los Angeles, California, US

Coordinates: 34.0632°N 118.4456°W

Holmby Hall is an historic landmark building in Westwood Village, Los Angeles, California. Built in 1929, Holmby Hall is a streetscape of six Spanish Colonial Revival storefronts and features a prominent white clock tower, capped by a green pinnacle. The tower measures about 110 feet tall and features six levels.

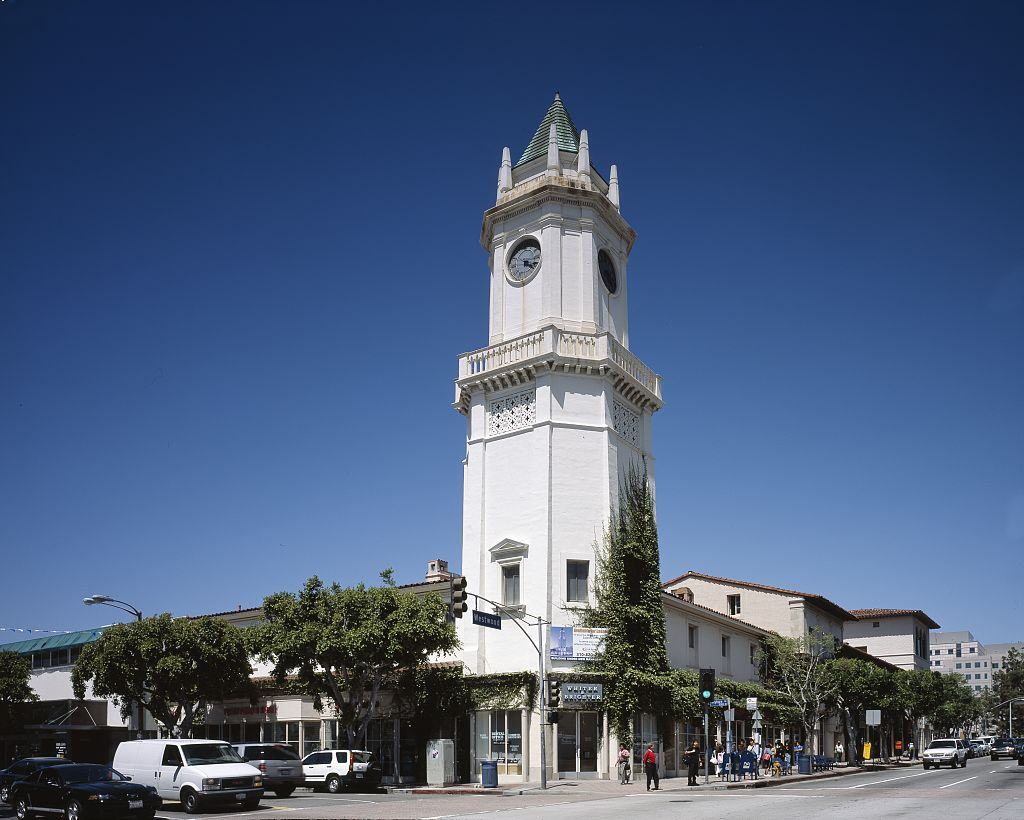
Holmby Hall clock tower before the fire damage

The building was designed by noted architects Gordon Kaufmann, John and Donald Parkinson. While the overall architectural style of the building is usually described as Spanish Colonial Revival the corner clock tower has been interpreted as English-Norman style architecture or as a "Gothically capped Classical clock tower".

Holmby Hall was the first shop building to be erected in the architecturally significant cinema/shopping precinct of Westwood Village and complied with the Mediterranean theme set by the developers of the village, the Janss brothers. The building was located adjacent to the University of California Los Angeles and Holmby Hall's history is tied in with that of UCLA, as the building was used as the first dormitory for female students of that famous university.

Holmby Hall is located at 921 Westwood Boulevard in the block between Weyburn and Le Conte Avenues, with the clock tower on the corner of Weyburn Avenue. Around 2003 a fire damaged the upper stories of the building.
