= Westside Pavilion =

Defunct mall in West Los Angeles, California, U.S.

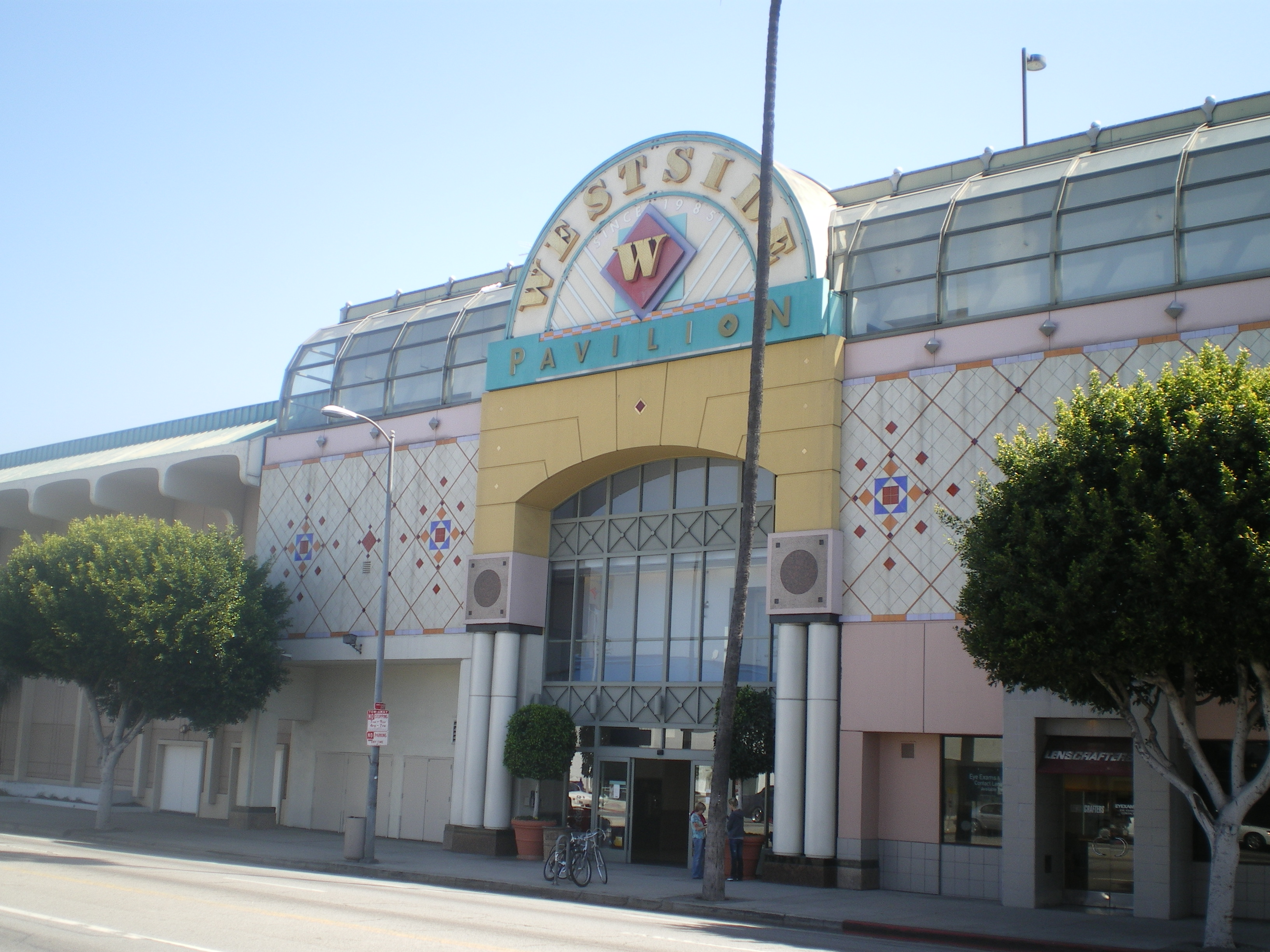
- Westside Pavilion, 2008
- Location: West Los Angeles, California
- Coordinates: 34.04036°N 118.42693°W
- Address: 10850 W Pico Blvd, Los Angeles, CA 90064
- Opened: May 31, 1985
- Closed: 2019 (interior)
- Developer: Westfield Group
- Owner: University of California, Los Angeles
- Architect: Jon Jerde
- Num. of stores: 0
- Num. of anchor tenants: 0
- Floor area: 739,822 sq ft (68,731.7 m^{2})
- Floors: 3
- Website: www.westsidepavilion.com

The Westside Pavilion is a former shopping mall located in West Los Angeles, California, United States. The University of California, Los Angeles is repurposing it into the UCLA Research Park. The three-story urban-style shopping mall once had 70 shops but was down to 54 retailers when Hudson Pacific Properties announced plans to convert most of the site to media and technology company offices. Formerly acting as landlord and developer in a joint venture with the previous owner, The Macerich Company, it was going to be renamed One Westside with offices for Google. The former Macy's department store was converted into a center for tech and entertainment tenants called West End. It is separately owned by GPI Cos.

== Development ==
The site was originally occupied by a mini mall known as Westland and a free-standing May Company building (built in 1964) that was later incorporated into the mall. Part of the mall also occupied the site of the Pico Drive-in movie theater - which was located there from 1934 to 1950 - and is considered only the fourth drive-in in the United States, and the first in California.

The Westside Pavilion was developed by the Australian Westfield Group. It was designed by The Jerde Partnership, the coordinating architectural firm of the 1984 Olympic Games, with a bold modern design of orange, lavender and green accent colors in geometrical shapes, evoking a Parisian shop-lined street. The mall connected an existing May Company department store at Pico and Overland with a brand new Nordstrom anchor store at Pico and Westwood. It was constructed at a cost of $90 million, and opened on May 31, 1985.

The first Aéropostale clothing store opened at the mall in 1987.

The plans to build the mall caused an uproar from the surrounding community over concerns of increased traffic and parking on the street. The community responded by banning street parking to non-residents and the developers agreed to provide adequate parking within the mall, as well as retain the Vons supermarket that existed in the previous shopping center. The mall quickly became a Westside landmark.

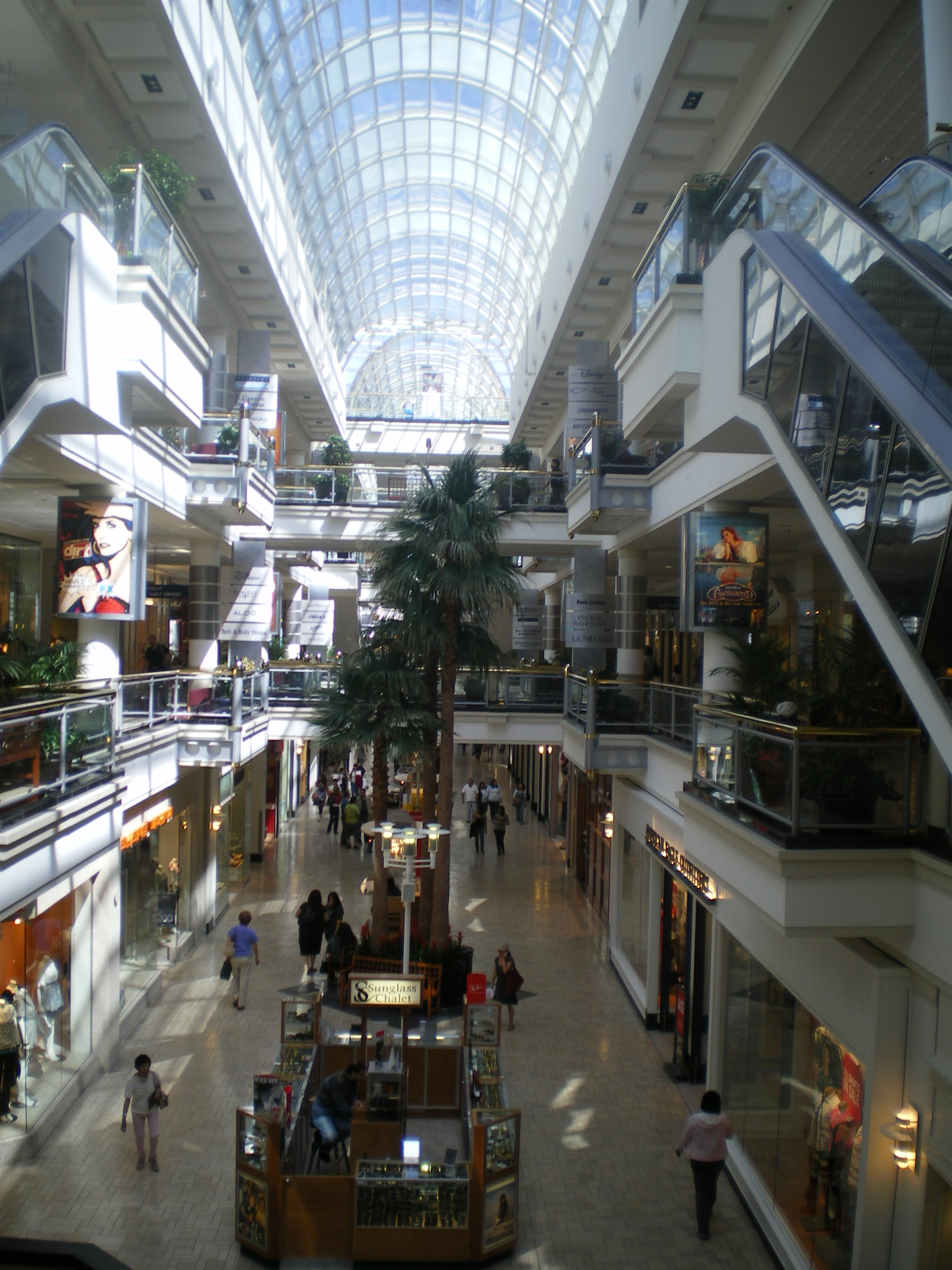
Westside Pavilion Interior, 2008

There was a plan to build a massive movie theater complex on the opposite side of Westwood Boulevard from the mall in 1986. That plan eventually evolved into an expansion of the mall, designed by the mall's original architect, Jon Jerde, which included new shops and al fresco restaurants all connected to the rest of the mall by a bridge over Westwood. The addition to the Westside Pavilion opened in 1991 despite criticism from many, including Los Angeles mayor Tom Bradley, The addition, officially known as "Westside Too", opened up with great fanfare and was very popular for the first couple of years, but its popularity soon began to decline as clients favored the original part of the mall. In 1993, the mall's May Company store became Robinsons-May, followed by Macy's in 2006.

By the late 1990s only a few shops and restaurants remained open in Westside Too, and the only major features remaining were the Barnes & Noble bookstore (which opened in 1995 in the space of three floors covering four previous shops) and the 1,000 parking spaces it had added. Most of Westside Too still had the dated early-1990s decor on the abandoned storefronts. Agencies serving the community, such as the West L.A. Chamber of Commerce and an infant and toddler gym, soon took over some of these spaces.

The original part of the mall was renovated in 2000 with the installation of carpeted seating areas and German limestone flooring to give it a more contemporary and upscale look. Westside Too remained open until January 2006, when it was closed to make way for a 12-screen Landmark movie theater and new restaurants.

The new addition opened in June 2007; Barnes and Noble was the only store from Westside Too that remained in the new addition. (The bookstore was closed for the duration of the renovations, but was not itself renovated.) The new addition complex, which was designed by the architectural firms F+A Architects and PleskowRael, featured the largest movie theater in the U.S. showing exclusively independent films - with 12-screens and 2,000 total seats. The theater also featured Landmark's new "Living Room" brand auditoriums. The "Living Room" concept featured smaller capacity theaters (30-50 people) with sofas, ottomans, side-tables and other home-like amenities. The theater also featured reserved seating and a wine bar.

In late 2008, a group of animal rights activists began peaceful protests in Westside Pavilion against a pet store called BarkWorks, which they alleged was a retailer for puppy mills. Macerich restricted the protesters to the pedestrian bridge over Westwood Boulevard and prohibited them from protesting on certain blackout days. The protesters conformed their conduct to Macerich's restrictions, but also filed a lawsuit to enjoin Macerich from enforcing them. On March 2, 2011, the California Court of Appeal for the Second Appellate District ruled that the trial court had erred in denying the protesters' motion for a preliminary injunction. The appellate court held that Macerich's restrictions (blackout days and not protesting directly in front of the targeted tenant) were unreasonable as a matter of law, and reversed and remanded for further proceedings. The lawsuit was settled in November 2011.

== Decline ==
In early 2015, Nordstrom announced it would relocate its Westside Pavilion store to Westfield Century City, a competing shopping center less than two miles away. The relocation took place in 2017.

On October 27, 2017, it was announced that Macy's would be closing in March 2018. On January 10, 2019, Macy's announced that the Macy's Furniture Gallery would also be closing as part of a plan to close 8 stores nationwide. The store closed in March 2019.

== Redevelopment ==
In early 2018, Macerich announced a joint venture with Hudson Pacific Properties in which most of the retail space within the three-story enclosed structure would be converted into office spaces for media and technology companies. Hudson Pacific Properties planned to redevelop the mall into "One Westside", a new office complex for Google. It was anticipated to occupy 584,000 square feet (54,300 m^{2}) and cost $410 million to renovate. After the conversion, the 12-screen Landmark Theater multiplex was to remain open to the public, but it closed on May 22, 2022. The Westside Tavern restaurant was also intended to remain, but it closed in October 2020, due to the economic impact of the COVID-19 pandemic. The former Macy's department store was converted into a center for tech and entertainment tenants called West End. The 230,000 square feet (21,000 m^{2}) of office space, owned by GPI Cos., was designed by HLW Architects.

Macerich was going to retain 25% ownership in the repurposed property. Hudson Pacific Properties would have managed the property and act as developer. Google would have been the sole tenant.

In late December 2023, the University of California, Los Angeles announced a deal to purchase the property which is located 2 miles (3.2 km) south of the Westwood campus. In 2024, University of California, Los Angeles Acquired the Mall and began conversion its to a research and educational facility. They will remake it into the UCLA Research Park, which will house the California Institute for Immunology and Immunotherapy at UCLA and the UCLA Center for Quantum Science and Engineering as well as other programs. With little room for growth on campus and the difficulty of finding an adequate nearby piece of property, this complex, only two miles (3.2 km) south of campus, allowed the university to proceed with this long contemplated research facility.

In 2025, an apartment complex named Overland & Ayres was built on the site of the demolished Macy's parking structure.

== In popular culture ==
Westside Pavilion has been used for music videos and motion pictures. The mall scenes in Tom Petty's video for "Free Fallin'" were filmed here (circa 1989), while its exterior was featured in the film Clueless. Howie Mandel visited this mall during an episode of Deal or No Deal to pick a contestant at random. He selected an employee who was working at the mall's Hot Dog on a Stick at the time.

=== Film ===
- North (Castle Rock Entertainment)
- Christmas with the Kranks
- Tower Heist (Universal)
- Disconnect (LD Entertainment)
- Luck (HBO)
- Clueless (Paramount)
- Take Me Home Tonight (Relativity)
- Den Brother (Disney)
- No Mans Land (Orion 1987)
