= History of Iranian Americans in Los Angeles =

Los Angeles (and Southern California in general) is home to a large Iranian-American community. Los Angeles is also notable for its very large Iranian Jewish communities in Beverly Hills, Santa Monica, Encino, and Calabasas. The Iranian population in Los Angeles is diverse with many ethnic subgroups like Iranians of Jewish descent, Iranian Azerbaijanis, Iranian Armenians, and Iranian Assyrians. With population estimates of 300,000, Southern California boasts the largest concentration of Iranians in the world, outside of Iran. The Iranian diaspora in Los Angeles includes those who fled the 1979 Islamic revolution, the increased immigration after the 2009 Green Movement, people who immigrated to the United States by winning Diversity Visa Program and those who were born in the U.S. Southern California is also distinct from Northern California with its larger presence of Armenian Iranians and Iranian Jews and Iranian Muslim. Tehrangeles is the other famous name among Iranian people in Iran and even in the Los Angeles because of the Iranian population in Los Angeles area.

== History ==
Iranian immigrants began arriving in the United States in the 1960s and 1970s. As the 1979 Iranian Revolution unfolded, large numbers of Iranians fled Iran. Many of them settled in Los Angeles. Many Iranian immigrants, including Muslims, Zoroastrians, Christians, and Jews, originated from the upper classes.

Los Angeles was ideal for Iranians because it reminded them of home. The "landscape, the car culture, [and] the mountains" was similar to what was found in 1970s Iran, says Dr. Reza Aslan.

In November 1979, Iranians stormed the U.S. Embassy in Tehran and seized hostages who were held for 444 days. A person quoted in Translating LA stated that Iranians in Los Angeles had "a wish to be invisible, which may have stemmed from the anti-Iranian feeling during the U.S. hostage episode."

Over the years, the Iranian community expanded across Southern California, with large numbers settling in Beverly Hills, the San Fernando Valley, Irvine and greater Orange County, as well as the Inland Empire.

In 1988 up to 3,000 Iranian Armenians were scheduled to arrive in the Los Angeles area.

== Demographics ==
Iranians in Los Angeles include irreligious Iranians, Iranian Muslims, Iranian Jews, Iranian Armenians, Iranian Assyrians, and Iranian Baháʼí.

As of the 1990 US census there were 76,000 Iranians in the Los Angeles region, 29% of the overall Iranian population of the United States.

In 1980, of the 37,700 ethnic Armenians in Los Angeles who were born outside of the United States, 7,700 came from Iran, outnumbering all other migrations of Armenians from any other nation.

As of 1980 about 70% of ethnic Armenian immigrants from the former Soviet Union, Iran, and Lebanon had arrived between 1975 and 1980.

=== Iranian Armenians ===
The 15-year-long Lebanese Civil War that started in 1975 and the Iranian revolution of 1979 greatly contributed to the influx of Middle Eastern Armenians to the US. The Armenian communities in these Middle Eastern countries were well established and integrated, but not assimilated, into local populations. Armenians in Lebanon and Iran are represented in the parliaments as ethnic minorities. Many lived in luxury in their former countries, and more easily handled multilingualism, while retaining aspects of traditional Armenian culture.

Regarding Iranian-Americans of Armenian origin, the 1980 US census put the number of Armenians living in Los Angeles at 52,400, of which 71.9% were foreign born: 14.7% in Iran, 14.3% in the USSR, 11.5% in Lebanon, 9.7% in Turkey, 11.7% in other Middle Eastern countries (Egypt, Iraq, Israel, etc.), and the rest in other parts of the world.

In 1988 up to 3,000 Iranian Armenians were scheduled to arrive in the Los Angeles area.

Compared to other Iranian groups, Iranian Armenians in Los Angeles had a higher likelihood of economic ties with one another. Most customers and employees of Iranian Armenians who had self-employment were not Armenian and not Iranian, while most business partners of self-employed Iranian Armenians were fellow Iranian Armenians. Der-Martirosian, Sabagh, and Bozorgmehr concluded that the Iranian Armenian ethnicity had a "special strength".

As of 1980, 80% of Iranian Armenians have fellow Armenian Iranians at their social gatherings and as spouses and close friends. Iranian Armenian parents have proportionately higher numbers of Armenian friends compared to their children.

=== Iranian Jews ===
As of 2008 the Los Angeles area had the largest Persian Jewish population in the U.S., at 50,000. In particular, Persian Jews make up a sizeable proportion of the population of Beverly Hills, California.

Jimmy Delshad, who became the Mayor of Beverly Hills, stated that around 1959 there were around 10 or 12 Persian families in the Los Angeles area. In the 1970s members of the Mahboubi family settled in Beverly Hills and began buying real estate on Rodeo Drive. The Beverly Hills Unified School District, the established Jewish community, security, and the reputation for wealth attracted Iranian Jews to Beverly Hills, and a commercial area of the city became known as "Tehrangeles" due to Iranian ownership of businesses in the Golden Triangle. After the 1979 Iranian Revolution about 30,000 Iranian Jews settled in Beverly Hills and the surrounding area. Iranian Jews who lost funds in Iran were able to quickly adapt due to their high level of education, overseas funds, and experience in the business sector. In 1988 1,300 Iranian Jews settled in Los Angeles.

In 1990 John L. Mitchell of the Los Angeles Times wrote that these Iranian Jews "function as part of a larger Iranian community" but that they also "in many respects[...]form a community of their own" as they "still manage to live their lives nearly surrounded by the culture of their homeland--going to Iranian nightclubs, worshiping at Iranian synagogues, shopping for clothing and jewelry at Iranian businesses." There had been initial tensions with Ashkenazi Jews in the synagogues due to cultural misunderstandings and differences in worship patterns, partly because some Iranian Jews did not understand that they needed to assist in fundraising efforts and pay dues. The tensions subsided by 2009.

The Iranian American Jewish Federation (IAJF) of Los Angeles is a prominent non-profit organization that has been serving the Iranian Jewish community of Greater Los Angeles for the last forty-one years. IAJF is a leading organization in their efforts to fight local and global Antisemitism, protect Iranian Jews domestically and abroad, promote a unified community, participating in social and public affairs, provide financial and psychosocial assistance to those in need through philanthropic activities, and more.

== Geography ==
Beverly Hills and the Los Angeles communities of Bel-Air and Brentwood were the destinations of many Iranian immigrants, who were the first immigrant groups to settle in these communities. In addition to those places Iranians also live in Santa Monica, West Los Angeles, and Westwood. As of 2007 there were about 8,000 Iranians in Beverly Hills, making up about 20% of the city's population, and as of 1990 the majority of Iranians in Beverly Hills were Jewish. By that year many Iranian restaurants and businesses were established in a portion of Westwood Boulevard south of Wilshire Boulevard. In 1990 Ivan Light, a sociologist for the University of California, Los Angeles, stated that the Westwood Boulevard area was the only "central location" for Iranians in Los Angeles and that they were otherwise dispersed throughout the area.

Many Iranians in the Beverly Hills area built large houses that contrast with the original single story bungalows; many Persians stated that the size of Friday Shabbat dinners contributes to their desire to build larger houses. Persian architect Hamid Omrani built around 200 of them. Non-Iranians in the Los Angeles area criticized the houses, calling them "Persian palaces," and in 2004 the city council of Beverly Hills addressed the criticisms by establishing a council to examine the designs of new houses; this council could cancel the plans of any new house that is too different from houses around it. In 2017, the Freedom Sculpture was inaugurated on Santa Monica Boulevard near Westwood, described as an Iranian-American led public art project dedicated to the values of freedom, diversity, and inclusiveness.

As of 1990 Irvine and the Palos Verdes area had the largest concentrations of Iranian Muslims, and Glendale had a concentration of Iranian Armenians.

== Economy ==
Iranian Jews and Iranian Muslims included professional workers such as bankers, doctors, and lawyers. As of 1990 Iranian Jews had a tendency of being involved in apparel manufacturing, jewelry manufacturing, and other jobs in the trade sector, while many Iranian Muslims were involved in the construction and real estate development sectors.

As of 1990 the Southern California region had 1,600 Iranian professionals and businesses listed in the Iranian Yellow Pages. As of 1996, the self-employment rate of Iranian managers and professionals in Los Angeles was over 50%.

As of 1980, 32% of U.S.-born Armenian and Iranian-born Armenian men 16 and older worked as executives and professionals, and about 33% of the same group worked as craftsmen and operators.

The 1980 self-employment rate of all ethnic Armenians in total was 18% and the percentage of self-employed Iranian Armenians was close to that number.

Compared to other Iranian groups, Iranian Armenians had a higher likelihood of economic ties with one another. Most customers and employees of Iranian Armenians who had self-employment were not Armenian and not Iranian, while most business partners of self-employed Iranian Armenians were fellow Iranian Armenians. Der-Martirosian, Sabagh, and Bozorgmehr concluded that the Iranian Armenian ethnicity had a "special strength".

== Politics ==
Halleh Ghorashi, author of Ways to Survive, Battles to Win: Iranian Women Exiles in the Netherlands and United States, wrote in 2003 that "The majority of Iranians living in Los Angeles have an extremely nationalistic approach toward Iran."

In 2007 ballots for elections in Beverly Hills began to be printed in Persian. That year, Jimmy Delshad, a Persian Jew, became the mayor of Beverly Hills; he was the city's first mayor of Iranian descent and also the country's highest-ranking political office holder of Persian origins.

Sepi Shyne, the Iranian-born American attorney, civil rights advocate, and member of the West Hollywood City Council has been serving as West Hollywood's mayor since 2023. Shyne is the first LGBTQ+ Iranian-American to be elected to office as well as the first woman of color elected to the West Hollywood City Council.

As the vast majority of Iranian Americans fled the Islamic Republic, the Iranian American community in the Los Angeles area has been known to show support for opposition movements such as the 2009 Green Movement, the Woman, Life, Freedom movement, and the 2025–2026 Iranian protests. The Lion and Sun flag is commonly displayed around the area and is often seen in rallies against the Islamic Republic. Celebrations erupted within the Iranian community across Los Angeles following the assassination of Ali Khamenei on February 28, 2026.

== Culture and recreation ==
Due to the wealth of many Iranian immigrants into Los Angeles, the stereotype that the public had of Iranians was of people who shop on Rodeo Drive and drive expensive automobiles. As of 1990 many Iranians do their shopping and eat out later than non-Iranians, so many businesses in the Los Angeles area extended their hours to accommodate Iranian customers.

Culture shock affected many Iranian families shortly after they arrived in the United States, partly because Iranian men who were accustomed to being the breadwinners and authorities in their households found their power diminished. Initially many Iranian families practiced arranged marriages but by 1990 the practice was declining. As of 2009 many older Iranian women in the Los Angeles area still practice doreh, where they have large gatherings where they enjoy entertainment, talk, and eat. Kevin West of W Magazine stated that the increase in working hours of Iranian women in the region could threaten this custom.

As of 1980, 80% of Iranian Armenians have fellow Armenian Iranians at their social gatherings and as spouses and close friends. Circa that year, Iranian Armenian parents had proportionately higher numbers of Armenian friends compared to their children.

The Noor Iranian Film Festival is held in the area.

Diasporic Iranians in Los Angeles have significantly contributed to production of Iranian pop music that circulates globally, including in Iran itself, as detailed in the book Tehrangeles Dreaming: Intimacy and Imagination in Southern California's Iranian Pop Music.

== Media ==
There is an extensive Iranian media network based in Los Angeles. Dozens of Persian-language satellite channels are produced in the Los Angeles area, with many of them beamed back to Iran.

Ghorashi wrote that "The major work of the Iranian media network and media in Los Angeles is concentrated on home, past and nostalgia, and strongly nationalistic ideas."

The show Shahs of Sunset by the Bravo Channel chronicles Iranians in Los Angeles. It began airing in 2012 and as of 2018 has seven seasons. Soon after the show premiered, some Persians in Los Angeles circulated petitions asking for the show's cancellation.

== Education ==
As of 1990 Iranian Jews and Muslims were in general educated. As of 1980, fewer of one out of ten Armenian-born Armenians and Iranian Armenians had low levels of education; these Armenian ethnic groups had the highest modal education category of the Armenian ethnic groups, with men achieving university degrees and women not having university degrees. Claudia Der-Martirosian, Georges Sabagh, and Mehdi Bozorgmehr, authors of "Subethnicity: Armenians in Los Angeles," wrote that "Although women, generally, had a lower educational achievement than did men, internal differences among subgroups were comparable to those of the Armenian men."

By 1990 about 20% of the students of the Beverly Hills Unified School District were Iranian, prompting the district to hire a counselor for Iranians and to write announcements in Persian. The Iranian Education Foundation donated money to the district.

== In culture ==
Shirin in Love depicts a woman of Iranian origins living in Los Angeles.

== Notable people ==
- Ray Aghayan, costume designer and Emmy award winner
- Shohreh Aghdashloo, Academy Award-nominated film/television actress
- Max Amini, comedian
- Tala Ashe, actress
- Reza Aslan, writer and professor at University of California, Riverside
- Touraj Daryaee, an Iranologist and Professor of Iranian history at University of California, Irvine
- Jimmy Delshad, Mayor of Beverly Hills, California
- Maz Jobrani, comedian
- Arash Markazi, writer at ESPN and adjunct professor at University of Southern California
- Roozbeh Farahanipour
- Paul Merage, co-founder of Chef America Inc., manufacturer of Hot Pockets
- Mahbod Moghadam, co-founder of Rapgenius and CEO of Everipedia - Encino
- Firouz Naderi, NASA director of Mars project
- Bijan Pakzad, fashion and perfume designer
- Nasim Pedrad, Comedian, former cast member of Saturday Night Live
- Cyrus Shahabi, computer scientist and director of the Integrated Media Systems Center at the University of Southern California.
- Roozbeh Farahanipour ceo of West Los Angeles chamber of commerce, Founding member of Westwood Neighborhood council, Board member BizFed, successfully businessman in Westwood and one of main Islamic republic of Iran opposition activist.
- Bob Yousefian, former mayor of Glendale

== See also ==
- Bibliography of California history
- Bibliography of Los Angeles
- Outline of the history of Los Angeles
- Tehrangeles
- Shahs of Sunset, reality television series
