= List of Shahs of Sunset episodes =

Shahs of Sunset is an American reality television series on Bravo in the United States and on OMNI in Canada. The series debuted on March 11, 2012, and the first season finale was the highest rated episode of the series, at the time, with 1.8 million total viewers. The series follows a group of Iranian American friends living in Beverly Hills (and the greater area known as "Tehrangeles"), who are trying to juggle their active social lives and up-and-coming careers while balancing the demands of their families and traditions. The current cast includes: Reza Farahan, Golnesa "GG" Gharachedaghi, Asa Soltan Rahmati, Mike Shouhed, Mercedes "MJ" Javid, and Shervin Roohparvar.

== Series overview ==
Season	Episodes	Originally released	
Season	Episodes	First released	Last released
1	6	March 11, 2012	April 15, 2012
2	13	December 2, 2012	March 10, 2013
3	16	November 5, 2013	February 25, 2014
4	16	March 2, 2015	June 15, 2015
5	17	April 10, 2016	August 3, 2016
6	15	July 16, 2017	October 29, 2017
7	15	August 2, 2018	November 29, 2018
8	15	February 9, 2020	July 26, 2020
9	15	May 16, 2021	August 29, 2021

== Episodes ==
=== Season 1 (2012) ===
No. overall	No. in season	Title	Original release date	U.S. viewers (millions)
1	1	"Image is Everything"	March 11, 2012	1.11
This series premiere introduces six Persian-American friends living a life of luxury in Los Angeles. The group tries to juggle their active social lives and careers while balancing the demands of their families and traditions. Drama ensues among the friends at dinner and a lavish pool party complete with a tiger. Asa makes herself an outcast with her unique wardrobe, while MJ's bitterness towards marriage is on display at a bridal store. GG appears jealous of Mike's date, fueling rumors that they may be more than friends.
2	2	"It's My Birthday Bitches"	March 18, 2012	1.08
Reza invites the group to Las Vegas for his over-the-top 38th birthday party, but after GG and MJ engage in some gossipy trash talking with Reza's friend Anita, tempers flare and threaten to ruin the weekend.
3	3	"Champagne Wars"	March 25, 2012	1.49
After returning home from Vegas, Golnesa must face the wrath of Reza, who's mad at her for the way she acted during his birthday weekend. Mike has a new real estate listing which could be the big payday he's been hoping for and Sammy works to get in the good graces of a major Beverly Hills real estate developer. Reza throws a champagne tasting party to see how refined everyone’s taste buds are.
4	4	"Waiting For MJ"	April 1, 2012	1.15
Sammy is put on the spot when Mohamed comes back from vacation and evaluates the work on his palatial Beverly Hills home. Asa plays her music for a major producer and starts to feel pressures to confirm her image. At GG’s parents' 40th anniversary party, she risks blowing her cool when MJ shows up four hours late to the festivities.
5	5	"The Shahs Of Great Neck"	April 8, 2012	1.33
GG vents to her sister about a fight she has at “Girls Night” with Asa and MJ, but finds little sympathy for her flaring temper. Seeking some closure, Reza travels to Long Island to confront his father about the long-simmering family issues. In the process, he discovers something more shocking and emotional than he ever anticipated about his family's history.
6	6	"Old Friends, New Problems"	April 15, 2012	1.53
Mike finally cops to the romantic tension simmering between him and GG. Asa gains a powerful new patron and debuts her song "Tehrangeles" to some of the most powerful people in the Persian community. Sammy and MJ set each other up on a double blind date, but while MJ bring a "nice girl" for Sammy, MJ is horrified to discover that Sammy definitely does not return the favor. Inspired by Reza's emotional trip to NYC, MJ decides to confront her overbearing and critical mother in a showdown 20 years in the making.

=== Season 2 (2012–13) ===
No. overall	No. in season	Title	Original release date	U.S. viewers (millions)
7	1	"The Whisky Makes You Frisky?"	December 2, 2012	2.29
Asa takes a big financial risk and moves back into her Venice mansion and MJ and her mother spar at a birthday dinner, but MJ is caught off guard by the viciousness of Vida's response. Reza befriends new Persian Princess, Lilly, and attempts to introduce her to the group, but things go south when GG and new friend Omid hit the bottle a little too hard and get more than a little sexual at the dinner table.
8	2	"The Persian Nose Business"	December 9, 2012	2.15
After her spat with Vida at a birthday dinner, MJ heads to the therapist to confront her issues with her mom, and realizes she is carrying more baggage than she thought. Mike has fallen in love with a girl but faces obstacles in their relationship. Then tempers flare at a pool party over a perceived insult, and Asa and GG's simmering resentments come to a shocking climax.
9	3	"I Love You But I Don't Like You"	December 16, 2012	2.14
The crew becomes divided as Asa and Reza draw a line in the sand over GG's behavior at the pool party. Asa tries to solve her money problems with an outrageous new business idea that's so crazy it might just work and GG's plans to become a business tycoon are derailed when she and her sister have a nasty fight. Reza is increasingly disillusioned with what he sees as MJ's character flaws and their friction sparks into a potentially friendship-ending fight.
10	4	"You Shouldn't Have Worn That Dress"	December 23, 2012	1.70
Asa makes a surprising turn as an old-fashioned gal when she brings her celebrity boyfriend lunch on the job. Mike struggles to tell his skeptical parents about his new job partnering with Reza. Then, Reza and MJ see each other at a cocktail party for the first time since their fight and are forced to confront their vengeful feelings.
11	5	"Please Bring a Man"	December 30, 2012	2.16
GG meets Omid for drinks and discovers he has been going out with her friends and she was deliberately not invited. After talking with his mother, Reza's heart softens towards MJ and he decides to mend fences. MJ decides to throw herself a deluxe birthday party with unusual party favors and is faced with choosing between inviting GG and inviting the rest of the crew.
12	6	"You Took an Ambien"	January 6, 2013	2.47
The friends decide to take a long weekend in Cabo, but Reza and Asa refuse to go with GG, so the group must make a tough call. GG decides to make the best of being cut out of the vacation by digging in and taking over the launch party for her extensions line, hoping to prove to her sister that she has what it takes to be a real business woman. Lilly and MJ bristle at being forced together by the rest of the gang, and tempers flare when Asa blurts out loud what everyone in the group has been wondering.
13	7	"Mo-Cedes, Mo Problems"	January 13, 2013	2.03
The group finds a way to move on after the explosive fight at dinner the night before by kicking it on a mega yacht. GG scrambles to pull together her launch party at the last minute, while trying to fan the flames with Omid. After going out to get their Heyvoon Vasi on, Reza, Asa, and Mike begin to suspect that Lilly might not be as good a fit in the group as they originally thought and MJ begins to stumble her way back into their hearts.
14	8	"Happy New Year"	January 20, 2013	1.57
After securing a major investor for "Diamond Water," Asa is finally able to purchase her diamond and create the first tank of her high energy gem infused water. Still exiled by everyone but MJ, GG questions if MJ is really her last friend standing, and spends a steamy day hanging with her crush Omid. Mike brings his girlfriend, Jessica, to his family's Shabbat dinner so that she can finally meet his parents, but wonders if she will pass the Persian Mom test, Reza brings Mike, MJ, and Asa to Great Neck for his family's Rosh Hashanah celebration and begins to consider forgiving his grandmother after gaining some insight into her difficult past.
15	9	"Hard for Me to Say I'm Sorry"	January 27, 2013	2.22
MJ has a breakdown at lunch with her mother and finally asks her to go to therapy with her. Lilly is shocked when a friend tells her that perhaps Ali won't marry her because her bikini business is not a "respectable" job for a Persian wife. Reza works behind-the-scenes to get everyone to sit down with GG so they can decide once and for all whether to officially "file for divorce" or mend the fences with her.
16	10	"Persh-A-Pelooza"	February 10, 2013	1.47
Mike embarks on a mission to break it to his Persian Jewish parents that Italian Catholic Jessica is "the one." Reza finally decides to get serious about his relationship with Adam and tell him he loves him. Lilly is brokenhearted and back to square one after deciding to break up with Ali ... this time for good. Asa makes her public performance debut as the headliner in the Persian pop music festival she created -- Persh-a-Pelooza. Note: This episode aired during the same time slot as the 55th Annual Grammy Awards.
17	11	"Reunion: Part 1"	February 17, 2013	1.63
In part one of the reunion, Asa and GG are in a room together for the first time since the terrible knife-wielding dinner party and apology-gone-wrong in the season finale. Accusations fly about out-of-control-lifestyles plus behind the scenes revelations about MJ's criminal past.
18	12	"Reunion: Part 2"	March 3, 2013	1.83
In part two of the reunion, Reza, MJ, Mike, Lilly, Asa, and GG join Andy Cohen again to address this season's conflicts and craziness. Reza and MJ finally reveal the behind-the-scenes drama that has been tearing the group apart all season.
19	13	"The Lost Footage"	March 10, 2013	1.36
This lost footage special features supersized drama that did not make it into the season, including the never-before-seen early days of Reza and Lilly's friendship, Lilly's trip with Asa to see her favorite plastic surgeon, and an ultra-revealing look into the rumors about MJ's drinking problem.

=== Season 3 (2013–14) ===
No. overall	No. in season	Title	Original release date	U.S. viewers (millions)
20	1	"Only Guilty Men Bring Flowers"	November 5, 2013	1.14
After an epic battle at reunion last season, Reza decides to mend fences with MJ in the best way he can. Mike and his girlfriend Jessica get serious when she agrees to start the process of converting to Judaism. GG and her sister Leila find a new friendship in the midst of Leila’s surprise divorce. Working to move forward, GG finally apologizes to her old nemesis Asa. Lilly throws herself a gala bash for her “Dirty 30” birthday but MJ ends up left off the final guest list, leaving Reza and the rest of the group caught in the middle.
21	2	"These People Are Not Your Friends"	November 12, 2013	1.32
Asa pays a visit to the bottling plant for Diamond Water and finds that she will need to make even more changes. Moving forward in their relationship, Reza and Adam decide to move in together. GG pressures her boyfriend Sean into a bigger commitment and works to get MJ hired as her sister’s realtor. The group is still split over MJ’s omission from Lilly’s party and tempers flare when MJ and Lilly finally meet face-to-face forcing the group to decide which side they are on in the MJ-Lilly Battle Royale.
22	3	"Bad Things Happen When I Eat Salami"	November 19, 2013	1.17
MJ is back in the group’s good graces, but after spilling one of GG’s secrets to her boyfriend Sean, she finds herself in yet another rift. GG asks for an apology from MJ, but MJ refuses leaving GG to retaliate by trying to get Leila to fire her. Lilly is still reeling from MJ’s assertion that no one in the group is her friend and questions why she even bothers. Mike helps his family pull together an epic Persian party to celebrate his brothers’ graduation from dental school, but tempers boil over at the party when Leila has to pull an angry GG and MJ apart.
23	4	"Sorry. Not Sorry."	November 26, 2013	0.97
Mike tries to drum up new business for his partnership with Reza using an outlandish method, but finds his mom’s approval is hard to come by. Asa works to move forward with a new art show and finds herself on the defense when Lilly confronts her about not standing up for her at the group dinner. GG and her family go on their annual rafting trip and invite Reza ... who decides to trick MJ into going with him in an attempt to get MJ and GG to mend fences. After an epic rafting excursion, GG asks again for an apology, but MJ still refuses to accept she did anything wrong.
24	5	"Fresh Off the Boat"	December 3, 2013	1.46
MJ and Vida work on their relationship, and Vida discovers MJ can still surprise her. Asa reveals her plans with Diamond water to her parents. Reza’s boyfriend brings home a surprise Persian neighbor who triggers a violent emotional reaction in Reza. In an effort to get closer to Reza, Mike gets the gang to visit a Middle Eastern gay club, where Reza has another run in with the unwelcome neighbor. A heated exchange between them pushes Reza’s buttons and he shocks the entire bar -- and himself -- with his emotional meltdown. The group is split when Reza storms out with MJ, leaving Mike to pick up the pieces.
25	6	"Persian Pride"	December 8, 2013	1.97
Feeling his absence, Asa, Lilly, and GG wrestle with the stories they hear about Reza and find his behavior unsettling. When Reza finally resurfaces, he makes an emotional confession to Asa.
26	7	"The Velvet Rage"	December 10, 2013	1.20
Mike and Jessica grow closer, while GG and Leila argue about MJ hanging around. Meanwhile, Reza enters therapy to deal with his recent outbursts and comes to some surprising conclusions.
27	8	"Caught in a Bad Bro-Mance"	December 17, 2013	1.27
Asa takes GG to Tai Chi to help cope with her anger issues and in the process she decides to finally come clean to Sean. Mike goes shopping for an engagement ring for Jessica, and Reza and Adam decide to host a housewarming party, but after recent events, Mike, GG, and Lilly are left off the guest list.
28	9	"Sometimes You Just Have to Drink It Off"	January 7, 2014	1.18
MJ tries to salvage some risqué personal videos she deleted from her computer, while still pursuing a business and personal relationship with GG’s sister Leila. Mike meets up with questionable friends to pursue a business opportunity while his mother applies pressure to ‘put a ring’ on Jessica. After her recent break-up, GG tries to date the hottie that she made out with at Lilly’s party. Asa prepares for the debut of her Diamond Water with a glamorous, celebrity studded launch party, but is totally unprepared for the blow up that happens when Reza and Mike see each other in person for the first time since Club Noor.
29	10	"The Buttery, Chocolate Croissant"	January 14, 2014	1.20
Asa brokers a tentative peace between MJ and GG, and the girls conspire to bring Reza and Mike together for a fun day at the races that they hope will inspire them to kiss and make up after the Diamond Water blowout.
30	11	"In Love There Must Be Torture"	January 21, 2014	1.05
After the debacle at the race track, MJ exacts her revenge on GG by crossing the line with GG’s parents. GG calls her sister out for blindly siding with MJ after the incident, and while the rest of the gang preps for their big trip to Turkey, Reza and Lilly have a fateful conversation that leads to an unexpected end.
31	12	"Return to the Homeland — Part 1"	January 28, 2014	1.45
Despite simmering tensions, the whole gang embarks on a vacation to Turkey to take part in Asa’s family reunion. While touring around the old city, Mike has a startling realization outside the Blue Mosque, and Reza wrestles with his identity as a gay man in a neo-Muslim country.
32	13	"Return to the Homeland — Part 2"	February 4, 2014	1.34
The group plans a yachting excursion on the Mediterranean, and GG and Reza must go to unusual lengths to solve their seasickness. Spurred on by her family reunion, Asa organizes a clandestine trip to the Iranian border for herself, her mother, and Reza, who are forbidden to return to the Homeland.
33	14	"Is This 40?"	February 11, 2014	1.37
GG and MJ go to visit a doctor about freezing GG’s eggs, and MJ and her mom’s birthday spa date goes horribly wrong. Reza plans a getaway for everyone except Lilly to Palm Springs at a private mansion where he unveils a big surprise about his future.
34	15	"Reunion — Part 1"	February 18, 2014	1.15
Bravo caps off the explosive third season of Shahs of Sunset with the two-part reunion when Reza, MJ, Mike, Lilly, Asa, and GG all sit down with Andy Cohen for the ultimate Farsi face-off.
35	16	"Reunion — Part 2"	February 25, 2014	1.04
Reza, MJ, Mike, Lilly, Asa, and GG continue to hash out all of the drama, excitement, ups and downs of the third season with Andy Cohen.

=== Season 4 (2015) ===
No. overall	No. in season	Title	Original release date	U.S. viewers (millions)
36	1	"I am Gay Ghandi"	March 2, 2015	1.33
The Shahs ring in the Persian New Year but the mood dampens when Mike picks a fight with Asifa’s boyfriend, Bobby. Although Reza steps in as the peacemaker, he begins to realize that Mike's problems may be bigger than anyone imagined.
37	2	"What Happened in Turkey?"	March 9, 2015	1.07
With hopes of building a future together, Mike’s girlfriend Jessica completes her conversion to Judaism with a dramatic ocean swim. At Asa's house, GG reveals a secret she has been holding since the group's trip to Turkey last year, casting a dark cloud over the tight knit group. To soak up the California sun, the crew decides to organize a luxurious staycation in Malibu, but the dynamic shifts when Mike faces off with Asifa’s boyfriend, Bobby, for the second time.
38	3	"The Devil's Staycation"	March 16, 2015	1.12
As the Shahs get their party on at the Malibu retreat, a guest's controversial comments spark another heated argument. Reza names MJ as his maid of honor, which creates tension between MJ and Asa. Trouble brews at Reza's humble abode when his fiancé's parents visit for the first time.
39	4	"The Secret is Out"	March 23, 2015	1.00
When details of the trip last year to Turkey emerge, Reza, Asa, and MJ start to wonder if GG is telling the truth. MJ spends more quality time with her new boyfriend, while Reza starts to wonder if his relationship with Adam is getting stale. GG finds out about Mike's upcoming engagement and spills the beans to the rest of the group about the Turkey incident.
40	5	"It's Nuclear Now"	March 30, 2015	1.10
At the first big pool party of the summer, Asa and Reza discuss breaking their promise to GG and warning Mike about the rumors. Feeling the heat, GG beats them to the punch and confronts Mike about what happened in Turkey.
41	6	"Will You Marry Me?"	April 6, 2015	1.14
Mike separates himself from the group. MJ enlists the help of Reza to prepare her boyfriend for a surprise brunch with her mom. Asifa and Bobby finally move in together, and Mike pops the question to his longtime girlfriend, Jessica.
42	7	"Crunch vs. Munch"	April 13, 2015	0.98
Reality sets in for Reza as he faces the truth about marrying his fiancée Adam. Meanwhile, GG enlists MJ’s help to get her back into the dating scene. Asa approaches her breaking point as she juggles living with her parents, helping Mike reconnect with the group, listening to Reza’s relationship troubles, and battling with MJ over leggings. To settle the score and relieve pent-up tension, everyone agrees to an intense game of dodgeball.
43	8	"An Inconclusive Truth"	April 20, 2015	1.16
Reza puts himself, MJ, and Asa on a diet plan for his pending nuptials. Mike dives into his wedding plans and attempts to reconnect with Reza. GG takes a polygraph test, but the unexpected results leave the group with more questions than answers. MJ is devastated when she suffers an unexpected loss.
44	9	"Can't Fake The Funk"	April 27, 2015	1.27
Asa returns to her roots and plans a performance art piece in the form of a veiled flash mob through the streets of Hollywood. Unhappy with the results of her first polygraph test, GG takes a second polygraph, with surprising results. To mend fences, Mike plans a peace summit over dinner with Reza, Asa, and MJ. His plans get derailed when his fiancée Jessica launches a martini fueled tirade against the crew.
45	10	"One Wedding And A Dog Funeral"	May 4, 2015	1.17
With wedding plans still up in the air, Reza takes a leap of faith and decides to have a destination wedding in Thailand. Asifa throws herself a Bollywood themed birthday party and when Bobby gives her a diamond necklace instead of a diamond ring, she begins to question the future of their complicated relationship. Reza revokes Mike's wedding invitation, creating chaos at Pablo's memorial service.
46	11	"A Tale of Two Parties"	May 11, 2015	1.13
As Reza and Adam get their marriage license, it becomes clear that Reza is on the verge of becoming a runaway bride. Determined to throw the ultimate bachelor party, MJ secretly holds Reza's booze filled go-go boy bash without Asa's knowledge. After partying it up, Reza can't keep a secret and spills the beans to Asa who is upset about the secret soirée.
47	12	"Bubbles of Fertility"	May 18, 2015	1.08
With the big day around the corner, issues between Reza and Adam begin to mount. After Adam accompanies Reza to a therapy session, Reza is forced to make a decision about their future. Meanwhile, MJ finds the courage to see a doctor and test her fertility.
48	13	"Big Trouble in Little Phuket"	May 25, 2015	1.39
As the group prepares to embark on Reza’s destination wedding, Mike decides to meet up with GG to discuss the rumors that have been swirling for months. With love in the air but drama trailing not too far behind, the trip to Thailand quickly becomes a therapy session for Asifa and Bobby as the couple rapidly approaches their breaking point 8,000 miles away from home.
49	14	"Lions and Buddhists and Persians, Oh My!"	June 1, 2015	1.23
While in Thailand, the Shahs visit a Buddhist temple, which brings the crew back together and enables everyone to explore their own path for healing. On their last night in Thailand, the group gathers at what was supposed to be Reza and Adam’s reception. Reality hits Reza as he begins to realize the impact of his decision and struggles with the life altering choice of what his future with Adam will be. Back at home, Mike has to make a major decision and choose between his future wife or lifelong friends.
50	15	"Reunion Part 1"	June 8, 2015	1.33
Andy Cohen sits down with the cast of Shahs of Sunset for their first get together since the season finale in Thailand. When Reza reveals his mustache-free face, the cast shares their own cosmetic enhancements. Then conversations go deep as MJ and Asa face off over Reza’s bachelor party and he updates everyone on the status of his relationship with Adam. Asifa discusses the pressures of being a newbie, and GG and Mike hash out the rumor that divided the group, causing Reza to abruptly storm off stage.
51	16	"Reunion Part 2"	June 15, 2015	1.21
In part two of the reunion, Reza returns to set after a heated departure. Andy Cohen quizzes MJ on her love life and the loss of her beloved dog, Pablo. GG updates everyone on her relationship with Danny and whether she'll ever settle down, and Bobby joins a tearful Asifa on the couch. As tensions flare, a nervous Jessica paces in her trailer waiting to join the group. When Andy reveals shocking news about Mike's new wife, the group erupts in confusion and anger.

=== Season 5 (2016) ===
No. overall	No. in season	Title	Original release date	U.S. viewers (millions)
52	1	"Persian of the Pacific"	April 10, 2016	1.60
After reflecting on last year's broken engagement, Reza reveals to Asa that he's finally ready to marry Adam. Newlywed Mike tells wife Jessica that he's finally ready to reconnect with his old friends. But when the group comes together at Shervin's 35th birthday party, a troubled GG threatens to ruin the celebration.
53	2	"C'est la Vida"	April 17, 2016	1.57
When Reza announces his plans for a surprise wedding, he encounters an unexpected foe - MJ. The cracks in Mike's relationship begin to show as Jessica challenges her husband about what she expects from married life. Asa struggles with her new family business, Asa Kaftans, and MJ prepares to introduce the new man in her life to her ultimate critic, her mother Vida.
54	3	"Oy Vey, MJ!"	April 24, 2016	1.31
As GG’s health issues escalate, she calls on Shervin for support during a painful medical procedure. In an effort to rebuild relationships with the group, Mike and Jessica throw a backyard Shabbat party, but tensions fray when MJ reveals a secret Reza’s not ready to share.
55	4	"Are We Out of the Woods Yet?"	May 1, 2016	1.35
Fashion designer Asa deals with the stress of a new business and a photo shoot for her rapidly expanding new line, Asa Kaftans. The group plans a camping trip to address GG's increasingly erratic behavior, and a night at home with Mike and Jessica reveals bigger issues in their marriage.
56	5	"Back to Nurture"	May 8, 2016	1.05
GG's health problems take center stage during a camping trip-turned-intervention. At the campground, a checked-out Mike continues to deal with his crumbling marriage, but refuses to confide in his friends. A ropes course bonds the group together, but when GG refuses to accept her real issues, the group must take matters into their own hands.
57	6	"A Cat-astrophic Night"	May 15, 2016	1.22
Back from camping, an invigorated MJ focuses on her new goal of starting a family with Tommy. Mike and Jessica start therapy, and Shervin gives his best game on a date with a sexy Australian. At Asa's mother's retirement party, the group discovers a shocking bombshell about Mike.
58	7	"Surprise! You're Married"	May 22, 2016	1.18
Reza and Asa head to Palm Springs to plan his surprise wedding to Adam. When a tight-lipped Mike shows up without his wife, MJ's insecurities come out to play, and GG attempts to keep the peace. And as an unsuspecting Adam arrives in the desert, Reza's anxiety rises to the surface. Has Adam healed enough from last year's canceled wedding?
59	8	"Six Persians Walk Into a Bar"	June 5, 2016	1.28
Back from Palm Springs, MJ faces fallout from her disintegrating relationship with Tommy. Newly wed and brimming with fresh confidence, Reza throws himself headfirst into a new passion: stand-up comedy. And when the group rallies together for Reza's debut performance at a local improv night, Mike makes a valiant attempt at winning his wife back.
60	9	"Lights, Camera, Kaftans!"	June 12, 2016	1.15
After their night of romance, Mike and Jessica meet to discuss how to repair their relationship. Meanwhile, MJ confides in Asa that her relationship with Tommy has worsened and he's moved out. Asa's debut fashion show for Asa Kaftans brings high glamor and big drama, when Shervin accosts GG about rumors concerning the severity of her illness.
61	10	"Belize It or Not"	June 19, 2016	1.26
In an effort to save Mike and Jessica's marriage, Reza plans a last-minute group trip to Belize where the couple can work out their issues. As the group touches down in the Belizean jungle, Mike waits nervously for his wife to arrive. Alone without her man, MJ contemplates life without Tommy, and GG's resentments toward Shervin explode during a tense first night dinner.
62	11	"Trouble in Paradise"	June 26, 2016	1.06
Attempting to forget his marital problems, Mike escapes to the Belizean rainforest for a day of sightseeing with Shervin, Nima, and GG. Back at the resort, MJ confides to Asa that her Vida-like ways may have cost her Tommy. A surprise visitor shocks the group, and Reza confronts Mike with newfound proof about his marriage, forcing Mike to reveal a dark secret.
63	12	"Is It Too Late to Say I'm Sorry?"	July 10, 2016	1.52
While exploring the Mayan ruins, an altercation between Reza and GG threatens to destroy the trip. Back in L.A., a remorseful Mike asks Asa for help to win his wife back, and GG embarks on a drastic new health regimen that shocks her inner circle. A brave Reza returns to the comedy stage for the first time since bombing.
64	13	"Mr. Shouhed's Wild Ride"	July 17, 2016	1.37
On a trip to Palm Springs, Reza and Adam take another step towards their future together. Reza and MJ make an unpleasant discovery about Jessica as Mike makes a last ditch effort to win her back. Shervin attempts to convince GG to make peace with Reza. In his desperation to make it to his shoe launch on time, Mike resorts to some interesting tactics to get his product across the US/Mexico border. Pressure mounts between Reza and GG as the group rallies together at Mike's Beverly Hills shoe launch.
65	14	"La Vida Loca"	July 24, 2016	1.25
To prepare for her future with Tommy, MJ clears some space in her condo, but she struggles to let go of some of her stuff. Reza and Adam finally make their marriage official. Mike fights through his feelings and poses for Asa's art show photos. MJ plans an elaborate "Rebirth" ceremony with friends and family at the Hollywood Forever Cemetery where Tommy has a life-changing surprise for her.
66	15	"OMGG"	July 31, 2016	1.52
MJ accepts Tommy's marriage proposal, despite Vida's disapproval. Reza and Adam share an illuminating conversation about having kids, and Mike makes the tough decision to move forward without Jessica. At the explosive unveiling of Asa's photography project, old battle wounds are opened, and Reza and GG hit a point of no return.
67	16	"Reunion Part 1"	August 2, 2016	1.10
Part 1 of the reunion kicks off with a bang, as rifts between the group take center stage. Golnesa and Reza waste no time picking up their jilted relationship right where it left off. Asa and Mercedes surprisingly butt heads and Mike is forced to confront the group when he opens up about his pending divorce from Jessica Parido, calling into question the bonds of their friendship. When Mama Vida Javid joins, her brutally honest opinions on her daughter's tight-knit circle cause tensions to peak.
68	17	"Reunion Part 2"	August 3, 2016	1.17
As the reunion wraps, the Shahs take Asa to task for her refusal to share her "real life" on camera. Golnesa faces the difficult truths about her Rheumatoid Arthritis, leading to an eruptive "he said-she said" between her and Reza. And when it all becomes too much for one member of the group, a heart-breaking meltdown leads to an unexpected moment.

=== Season 6 (2017) ===
No. overall	No. in season	Title	Original release date	U.S. viewers (millions)
69	1	"The Miracle Baby"	July 16, 2017	1.20
After moving into their new condo mid-renovation, MJ and Tommy butt heads with a feisty surprise neighbor. Asa reveals her “miracle” pregnancy to Reza and wonders how it will affect her ongoing feud with MJ. Newlyweds Adam and Reza play a game of tennis, and Reza is reminded that the ball isn't always in his court. Meanwhile, former train wreck GG is on a path to finding Zen and tries unconventional methods to get to a healthier place. As Mike hosts a housewarming party with the crew to celebrate his new chapter, Asa’s shocking pregnancy announcement forces MJ and Reza to face the crossroads in their own personal lives when it comes to starting families of their own.
70	2	"A Long Trip for a Short Apology"	July 23, 2017	1.05
Reza and Adam throw an anniversary celebration, where Shervin tells the group that he and Annalise are exclusive and GG is once again left behind. Shervin hosts a Malibu house party and invites Reza and GG in hopes of getting them to make amends. While there, GG makes strides when she apologizes to Adam for attacking him at Asa’s art show last year, but she and Reza actively avoid each other as the party rages. On their way to Malibu, MJ and Reza make a pit stop to visit her father and Reza learns that Shams may not be doing as well as MJ has been letting on.
71	3	"Hava Nagila, Hava Tequila"	July 30, 2017	1.17
Tensions are high as plans for a trip to Israel cause a divide amongst the crew. With Halloween approaching, Reza puts on a “Peace in the Middle East” costume party in an attempt to bring the group back together. Meanwhile, GG tries responsibility on for size at the LA Fashion Week runway. After a romantic night out, MJ and Tommy decide to take the next step toward becoming parents. Alongside her family, Asa navigates managing her expanding business with her expanding belly.
72	4	"Let My People Go"	August 6, 2017	1.18
Reza and Adam have an emotional experience exploring both the surrogacy and adoption routes. GG's relationship is laid on the line when she introduces her Jewish boyfriend to her Muslim parents. The Shahs are excited for their trip to Israel, but getting into the country proves to be harder than it seems. MJ is adamant about being a mom soon, but after a wild night out, her friends wonder whether she's ready.
73	5	"Dreidels and Betrayals"	August 13, 2017	1.11
Asa plans a day trip to the ancient city of Akko to shoot a documentary with the group, but her plan backfires as religious tension between Mike and GG comes to a head. Then, during an emotional trip to the Western Wall, Reza attempts to tap into his Jewish side, while MJ struggles to find a clear vision of her future with Tommy.
74	6	"Hooray for Holy Land!"	August 20, 2017	1.11
During their journey towards enlightenment in Israel, drama erupts when Asa drops a bombshell during a group lunch at the Dead Sea. The boys take MJ out to dinner in an attempt to offer advice on how to move forward with her life, while GG makes a very permanent decision that involves her boyfriend Shalom. Asa reveals the gender of her baby during a group dinner on the last night of the trip.
75	7	"You Got Sherv'd"	August 27, 2017	1.17
Asa begins to feel more isolated from the crew. During a boys’ night out, Mike decides that it's time to move forward with his love life, while MJ continues to move forward with hers. MJ hears some major gossip about Shervin that quickly spreads to the rest of the crew. With Baby Fever contagious, Adam continues to put pressure on Reza, MJ and Tommy continue their own baby-making quest, and even GG’s biological clock begins to tick. Mike, looking to cash in on his friends’ new obsessions, decides to expand his shoe line to include baby shoes. GG’s 80’s themed roller-skating party turns into an interrogation when Shervin is forced to confront the rumors about him head on.
76	8	"The Art of Deflection"	September 10, 2017	1.20
As Reza and Adam find out if their swimmers are strong enough to produce a little Farahan of their own, MJ continues to question how Asa became pregnant. Mike pushes forward with his baby shoe venture in the hopes of making his mother proud, but the experience raises the question of when he'll take a second chance at starting a family of his own. Though she's not feeling supported by her friends, Asa holds an event to screen the video she filmed in Israel in the hopes of bringing everyone together with the message of peace.
77	9	"A Tale of Two Turkeys"	September 17, 2017	1.12
Reza discovers that Mike is not officially divorced, raising suspicion that he might still be attached to Jessica. The Shahs try to put their differences aside when they head to a homeless shelter to serve up some happiness. Shervin and Asa have separate Thanksgiving dinners, but each has its own drama. A very hurt Asa confronts Mike about how isolated she's felt since announcing the pregnancy to the group. She and Reza have a frank and potentially friendship-changing conversation. Meanwhile, Shervin runs interference to assure nobody talks to Annalise about the swirling swerving rumors and GG attempts to bury the hatchet with her reluctant sister.
78	10	"The Lying Game"	September 24, 2017	1.12
MJ takes tentative steps towards renovating her condo but is overwhelmed by all the moves she has yet to make. Shervin and Annalise have an unwanted guest bring some even-more-unwanted news during Annalise’s final night in LA. GG’s boyfriend Shalom helps her pack as she prepares to head to New York for her play, but he doesn't quite have all the information about what her performance entails. Meanwhile, Reza plans to put on a play of his own starring himself and MJ. MJ tells her mother that she wants to have a baby, much to Vida’s dismay. The crew heads to MJ’s to give her a gentle nudge towards completing her renovation, but the night turns into a drunken mess when Shervin owns up to his mistakes and Tommy drops a bomb on MJ that threatens to tear them apart.
79	11	"The Shahs Take Manhattan"	October 1, 2017	1.34
As the crew sets out on a trip to New York to see GG's performance, everyone is at a crossroads in their relationship. Mike has recently, but perhaps reluctantly, signed his divorce papers. Reza and Adam meet with a gay Rabbi to find some clarity on their future. MJ and Tommy endure the aftermath of a potentially relationship-ending fight. And GG has to decide if Shalom is the right person to spend her future with.
80	12	"Sex (Tips) in the City"	October 8, 2017	1.28
GG prepares for the opening night of her play. Destiney embarks upon a new business venture, but her big night is interrupted when Shervin arrives and their previous fight bubbles to the surface. La Toya Jackson gives Asa advice on how to deal with being a member of a famously infamous family. Tommy, MJ and some of the crew enjoy a warm welcome when they visit Tommy's family in Queens. The risqué subject of GG's play may put her newly engaged status in danger and her newfound Oosa is put to the test on the night of her first performance.
81	13	"The Thread That Broke the Shahs' Backs"	October 15, 2017	1.38
GG and Reza uncover some information regarding Mike and Jessica's relationship and decide to take action. Asa, nearing the end of her pregnancy, makes a decision regarding her future with the group. Reza makes a statement to the world with his play. Adam and Reza's small tiffs come to a head when Reza makes a comment that may push Adam over the edge. At the Winter Wonderland Ball, GG and Reza put their plan to run interference between Jessica, Mike and Mike's mother into action, yielding surprising results. Mike's relationship is hurled into perspective, but Reza and Adam's remains on the edge.
82	14	"Reunion Part 1"	October 22, 2017	1.41
The reunion kicks off with unresolved tensions among the group at an all-time high. As the Shahs look back on their trip to Israel and their efforts to bring some peace to the Middle East, they waste no time reopening old wounds. As they take each other to task, Asa accuses Mike of being racially insensitive both abroad and at home. And when Asa confronts Mercedes about calling her child a “bastard,” years of conflict finally reach the breaking point.
83	15	"Reunion Part 2"	October 29, 2017	1.39
The reunion comes to a dramatic close when the Shahs are forced to confront their varying relationship issues. Golnesa's estranged husband, Shalom, pays a surprise visit to discuss the truth behind their breakup and reveals the current state of their marriage. Mike delivers the final word on his future with ex-wife Jessica and Shervin addresses the infidelity rumors surrounding his relationship with Annalise. Reza's husband, Adam, joins the group and they surprise their friends with jaw-dropping news. With everything laid out on the table, a concerned Asa is asked the question on everyone's mind – does she still care about her friends?

=== Season 7 (2018) ===
No. overall	No. in season	Title	Original release date	U.S. viewers (millions)
84	1	"A Short Kiss Goodnight"	August 2, 2018	0.95
Mike, having finally begun to move past his marriage drama, is single and ready to mingle with new crush Mona, who he invites (along with her brother Nema) on a trip to Big Bear. Nema meanwhile, only has eyes for GG, who is still in the middle of a contentious divorce. On the group trip up to the mountains, the Shahs work to maintain their balance on the slopes and back at their shared house.
85	2	"It's My Party and I'll Make You Cry If I Want To"	August 9, 2018	0.91
At the end of a fun-filled vacation, Reza and MJ make an exciting announcement that incites an argument amongst the group. Back in LA, new homeowner Mike has a reluctant but hardworking project manager in Reza, who is slowly becoming irritated with Mike's reliance on him. MJ plans a Valentine’s Day party, but her hopes for a love-fest are dashed as the night ends with a dramatic showdown. Nema, on the other hand, is in the midst of a relationship crisis and realizes he needs to come clean about his flirtation with GG to his live-in girlfriend.
86	3	"A Date With Destiney"	August 16, 2018	0.92
MJ rides an emotional roller coaster as she deals with the fallout from the Valentine’s Day party, as well as her dad’s declining health. Nema comes clean to his live-in girlfriend about his flirtation with GG and faces the consequences. Reza, whose husband Adam has been not-so-subtly hinting about having a baby for over a year now, considers an investment opportunity that would likely push the baby plans back. Meanwhile, Destiney begins to dip her toes back into the dating pool.
87	4	"Javid Shah: Long Live the King"	August 23, 2018	0.85
After the tragic loss of her father, the Shahs rally around MJ as she tries to maintain her stability while continuing to plan her wedding. Nema is put in an awkward position when his crush GG and his ex-girlfriend, who he still has feelings for, come face-to-face at his sister Mona’s birthday party. GG takes the next steps in her divorce from her estranged husband, in the hopes of moving forward.
88	5	"Bridal Bath Wrath"	September 6, 2018	0.89
As she prepares for her Bridal Bath in Palm Springs, MJ continues to deal with the loss of her beloved father and becomes increasingly frustrated with Tommy's lack of participation in planning their wedding. Reza takes the plunge and invests a large sum of money into his new business – without telling Adam. GG is also starting a new business with help from Nema, who she begins to warm up to. Against his mother's wishes, Mike also decides to take on a new business venture.
89	6	"Emeralds Aren't Forever"	September 13, 2018	0.91
The Shahs ring in Nowruz (Persian New Year) with food, fun, and plenty of drama. Haunted by his past, Mike chooses not to invite his girlfriend to the festivities at his mother's house – and everyone has an opinion. Reza grows anxious in his attempts to tell Adam about his costly haircare line investment. After stalling for a bit, GG attempts to take the next steps in her divorce proceedings.
90	7	"It's Passover: Let Your Girlfriend Go!"	September 20, 2018	0.92
Hoping to get to the root of her issues with men, Destiney hires a private detective to find her father. This inspires Reza to confront his own daddy issues and he realizes he may not be ready for the children Adam so desperately wants. Mike takes tentative steps to move forward in his relationship with Morgan, but the group attempts to push things further than he is comfortable with.
91	8	"Clash the Persians"	September 27, 2018	0.80
The Shahs take Vegas by storm for MJ's last trip as a single woman. GG's progress with Shalom regresses and the others decide to take action. Mike's relationship with Morgan takes a serious hit when the group embarks on MJ's bachelorette weekend, sending him into a spiral that tests more than one of his relationships within the crew.
92	9	"Sex, Lies, and iPhone Videos"	October 11, 2018	0.99
After a fun night of clubbing in Vegas, the group wakes up and makes a shocking discovery about Mike. When he is confronted, chaos ensues and tensions come to a head. Once back in LA, MJ's wedding preparations continue with her first dress fitting. GG takes her weed business to the next level with help from Nema.
93	10	"The Prenup Hiccup"	October 18, 2018	0.85
MJ and Tommy take the final steps in prepping for their wedding. GG throws the official launch party for WüSah with Nema's guidance, but is unsure if it will spark the attention she wants. Mike continues on his path toward self-improvement with a little help from his father. Reza and MJ say goodbye to Shams.
94	11	"Vida Knows Best"	October 25, 2018	0.79
MJ feels the pressure of finalizing her wedding and simultaneously planning for a baby, all while managing her mother Vida. Mike and Reza bond over Mike’s real estate investment. GG finally starts taking the steps necessary to file divorce paperwork. After a frank conversation with his old friend Asa, Adam confronts Reza about his hesitation in expanding their family. Destiney’s gets unexpected help on her rocky road to finding her father.
95	12	"Bless This Mess"	November 1, 2018	0.89
MJ and Tommy struggle to convince Vida to give them her blessing before getting married. Reza launches his haircare business – with or without Adam's approval. Nema develops his Persian "street cred." MJ takes an ill-advised detour on the way to the altar.
96	13	"A Very MJ Wedding"	November 8, 2018	1.01
MJ's wedding unfolds in typical MJ fashion – sprinkled with chaos and complications. As the bride attempts to make it down the aisle in one piece, the Shahs are forced to confront their own true feelings about marriage and contemplate their futures.
97	14	"Reunion Part 1"	November 15, 2018	0.84
As the reunion kicks off, the Shahs waste no time shaking things up. Newlyweds Mercedes and husband Tommy have life-changing news to share with their friends, but only after they've spoken with Mercedes’ opinionated mother Vida. Reza, joined by his husband Adam, recounts the challenging hurdles that led them to the brink of divorce. Mike finds himself on the defense after talk of his most recent failed relationship leads Destiney and Nema to question his treatment of women. When the group confronts Golnesa about her excessive smoking, it becomes too much for their impulsive friend.
98	15	"Reunion Part 2"	November 29, 2018	0.88
The dramatic sit-down continues as the group recounts a series of exhilarating highs and challenging lows. Destiney reexamines the emotionally-draining search for her father and shares what she found out about him. Nema and Golnesa come clean about just how far their flirtatious encounters went, while Mike and Reza deal with the remnants of their fallout in Las Vegas. Mercedes, with Vida and Tommy by her side, divulges secrets about her wedding and their hopes for the future.

=== Season 8 (2020) ===
No. overall	No. in season	Title	Original release date	U.S. viewers (millions)
99	1	"Naked Jenga and Afraid"	February 9, 2020	1.07
The Shahs are back, and all grown up! Reza and GG decide to bury the hatchet, though GG has yet to make amends with Destiney following their reunion blowup. While Mike boasts that his bad boy ways are behind him after finding the love of his life, newly-single Nema is ready to mingle. Reza and Adam celebrate their new crib with the ultimate Persian housewarming party and invite new-girl-in-town, Sara, to join in on the fun. As trouble begins to brew amongst the group, everyone is shocked to find that the most unexpected person might be to blame.
100	2	"A Very Shouhed Passover"	February 16, 2020	1.14
After Reza confronts the person spreading rumors about his husband, he discovers a shocking revelation about MJ that leaves Destiney caught in the middle of the chaos. Mike prepares to take on one of the biggest business ventures of his life on Passover weekend, despite his family and friends’ disapproval. GG tries to speed up her fertility by taking everyone on a unique adventure.
101	3	"I Want You to Be My Muddy Buddy"	February 23, 2020	1.11
As the crew preps for a mud run, Destiney attempts to apologize to Reza, who refuses to budge. GG secretly undergoes the implantation process in her IVF journey. Mike goes head-to-head with his father over a large business venture he is looking to pursue solo. Nema reaches a crossroad with his ex-girlfriend and business partner, Erica, and he questions whether they can stay in their working relationship despite their messy breakup.
102	4	"The Persian Hangover"	March 1, 2020	1.18
Reza, Destiney, and Sara head to Vegas to promote Reza’s new “Reza Be Obsessed” collection, and things take a turn when Destiney hits it off with newbie Sara’s brother, Sam. GG finds out whether she can go through with the implantation process in the hopes of getting pregnant. MJ recounts her resentment toward Reza, while Mike and Nema butt heads.
103	5	"Great Persian Bakeoff"	March 6, 2020	0.57
Destiney tries to navigate an awkward situation in Vegas after a wild night with the group. Nema attempts to reconnect with his Persian roots. Meanwhile, Paulina finds herself caught in the middle of Mike and Nema’s spat. GG arranges a cooking class for the crew to bond, but questions how much longer she can keep her journey to motherhood a secret.
104	6	"Pool Party Massacre"	March 13, 2020	0.72
GG grapples with the consequences of continuing to hide her IVF from the group but begins to worry that unnecessary drama will harm her health. Sara and Destiney clash over Destiney’s tryst with Sara’s brother while the group was in Vegas. Mike is haunted by Nema’s accusations about him and Paulina. Hoping to mend the fallouts amongst the group, Nema brings MJ to Sara’s pool party but his plan backfires when she comes face-to-face with Reza.
105	7	"Don't Mess With Destiney"	March 20, 2020	0.96
Tommy takes matters into his own hands after Reza’s altercation with MJ at the pool party, furthering the divide between the Shahs. GG’s divorce is finalized as she gets ready to drop a bombshell on the crew. Destiney’s event in Arizona goes awry and to top it off, Nema, Mike, and Shervin back her into a corner with nowhere to run.
106	8	"Vida's Court"	March 27, 2020	0.89
Reza surprises Destiney in Arizona and is infuriated to find that Nema, Mike, and Shervin may be siding with MJ. In the meantime, MJ plans a surprise retirement party for her mother Vida. MJ and Destiney meet up for what can only be the turning point in the madness.
107	9	"The Shady Bunch"	April 3, 2020	0.82
GG undergoes emergency surgery and the crew rallies around her. Tommy and MJ meet with a lawyer to discuss Reza’s charges against them. Reza unleashes his anger on Nema for meddling in his personal affairs.
108	10	"Country Fried Persians"	April 10, 2020	0.95
Destiney surprises Sara’s brother Sam for his birthday, but questions loom after she sees a completely different side to him. Nema prepares for his “Boots ‘N Brews” event, all while his ex-love Erica finally leaves his company. The entire crew - including MJ - gears up for his event, prompting MJ and Reza to finally meet face-to-face.
109	11	"Le'ing With the Devil"	April 17, 2020	0.93
Mike surprises Paulina with a trip to Hawaii for her birthday and invites the whole crew to come along. Paulina plans a night out with the girls in the hopes of finding common ground before the trip, while Nema and Mike prepare by getting Botox. Upon arrival in the Aloha State, tensions among the Shahs come to a boil, making for one unforgettable Lu’au.
110	12	"The Persian Shore"	April 24, 2020	0.93
The Shahs are on a trip to Hawaii to celebrate Paulina’s 29th birthday. MJ makes an off-color remark and causes a stir with Mike and Paulina. Nema and GG find themselves having too much to drink, heightening the lingering tension between them.
111	13	"Bye, Bye, Ms. Iranian Pie"	May 1, 2020	0.91
The Shahs are back in LA for the final episode of the season. GG is preparing herself for another IVF journey. Nema and his sister Mona gather with their dad to get closure on their parents’ divorce. MJ hosts a Sip ‘N See for baby Shams. Destiney is caught in the middle when Mike sides with his girlfriend, Paulina, and not MJ. Sara prepares for a Fourth of July party and everyone is invited. Reza reveals a secret he's been keeping all to himself. After all is said and done, the future of this tight-knit crew hangs in the balance.
112	14	"Reunion Part 1"	July 19, 2020	0.74
Andy Cohen hosts the Shahs of Sunset Reunion Part One.
113	15	"Reunion Part 2"	July 26, 2020	0.65
Andy Cohen hosts the Shahs of Sunset Reunion Part One.

=== Season 9 (2021) ===
No. overall	No. in season	Title	Original release date	U.S. viewers (millions)
114	1	"50 Shades of Shouhed"	May 16, 2021	0.83
In the hopes of mending their 30-year relationship and healing their fractured friend group, Reza and MJ plan a trip to Palm Springs to celebrate Mike's birthday; GG, looking to stay out of the drama, embraces being a new mum to her son, Elijah.
115	2	"The Golden Years"	May 23, 2021	N/A
The Shahs are anxious about their reunion in Palm Springs; as tensions quickly escalate between Reza and Nema over old wounds, new friend and life coach London steps in to lend her perspective; GG's unsolicited advice is ill-received, causing a rift.
116	3	"Big Little Persian Lies"	May 30, 2021	N/A
On Mike's birthday trip to Palm Springs the crew pulls out all the stops; Reza is pushed to his limit; GG finds common ground with an old foe; Mike makes an announcement that lights all of Palm Springs on fire.
117	4	"The Truth Shall Sext You Free"	June 6, 2021	0.87
After Mike makes an announcement that shocks the group, Reza flees Palm Springs, leaving GG to wonder who she can trust and how she was pulled into Mike’s text scandal. With her guard up, GG agrees to take baby steps toward healing her troubled friendship with MJ. MJ also reassesses her relationship with Reza and navigates the muddy waters toward reconciliation. In her crusade to teaching men accountability for their behavior, Destiney turns her focus to her nephew.
118	5	"A New Shah Is King"	June 13, 2021	0.79
After a rocky Palm Springs getaway, the Shahs attempt to return to normal life and prepare for baby Elijah's welcome party. Nema is on the outs, however, and struggles with not being invited to the celebration. Mike's texts continue to dominate the conversation, as both he and Reza point the finger at each other. Reza is doing damage control after leaving GG and Destiney behind in Palm Springs. After GG reveals to Reza that Tommy does not want him to meet baby Shams, Reza is left heartbroken and his behavior takes a turn.
119	6	"A Nightmare on Destiney's Street"	June 20, 2021	0.64
Halloween is the scariest time of the year, and with the Shahs still very much a fractured bunch, Destiney's upcoming party might be more "trick" than "treat.” During Elijah and Shams’ first play date, GG helps MJ realize that Reza needs uplifting, leading to an emotional meeting between the lifelong friends. Destiney finds herself sinking deeper into Mike's relationship drama when Paulina reveals dirty secrets about her man. Paulina makes Destiney swear to not say a word, setting up a potentially turbulent holiday gathering for the group.
120	7	"The Shah-Shank Redemption"	June 27, 2021	0.62
Still reeling from the horrors of Halloween, Mike and Destiney lean on their friends for support. Nema and Shervin treat Mike to a guys' night out, while MJ hosts a girls' night-in across town. It’s not all fun and games, however, when GG questions Destiney’s loyalty to Paulina over Mike. Meanwhile, Reza is working on his memoir and finds himself on an emotional trip down memory lane.
121	8	"Zero Thanks Given'"	July 11, 2021	0.77
In the season of giving thanks, the Shahs are motivated to heal their damaged relationships. With help from London, Nema reaches out to Golnesa to offer an apology, while Mike meets up with Reza hoping to find peace. When the group gathers for Friendsgiving dinner, however, the initial good vibes are gobbled right up after they question Paulina’s absence. Mike’s response does not sit well, and tensions come to a boil when hurled accusations make for anything but a celebration.
122	9	"A Friend in Need is a Friend Indeed"	July 18, 2021	0.74
A tumultuous yet heartfelt ending to Friendsgiving offers much food for thought. GG confronts Mike over her concerns about Paulina’s shifting loyalties. MJ gets real with the group about struggles in her marriage. Reza turns his focus onto his book, Memoirs of a Gay Shah, and interviews his mom hoping she sheds some light on his childhood. Meanwhile, London aids Nema in his quest for a love connection.
123	10	"To Ahloo or not to Alhoo"	July 25, 2021	0.64
The Shahs look to move forward as Mike’s building project nears completion and Destiny says “Ahloo" to a new clothing and accessories line. Facing intimacy challenges in her marriage, MJ looks to spice things up. GG devises a plan to help her friends get to a better place, and for her own growth, attempts an armistice with her old bestie Shervin. Wanting desperately to meet baby Shams, Reza finds himself between a rock and hard place with Adam.
124	11	"Shah-nanigans"	August 1, 2021	0.64
Tired of the conflict within the group, GG takes her friends on a nature healing trip. While Reza and Adam make progress in their discussions over the restraining order, MJ continues to hit the same brick wall with Tommy. On an epic RV drive to their Redwoods getaway, lingering tensions between Reza and Mike arise with newcomer London becoming collateral damage. Nema and Destiney get their flirt on, and a topless video of MJ quickly becomes the topic of conversation. GG expresses fears about her fledgling friendship with Reza after witnessing some concerning behavior on the trip.
125	12	"The Good, the Bad and the Shahsy"	August 8, 2021	0.61
The crew kicks off the first day of their Redwoods trip with adventure, bonding and libations. Mike and MJ overcome fears in the tree-tops, while Reza’s group enjoys the vineyard and questions Paulina’s whereabouts. GG’s western-themed evening starts off with a bang when Destiney receives a surprise phone call – with incriminating information about someone in the crew. Later, GG reveals deep insecurities to MJ as they bond over motherhood. Meanwhile, MJ’s friends push her to tell Reza about Tommy’s feelings, leading to an emotional conversation between the two.
126	13	"High and Dry"	August 15, 2021	0.66
The Shahs feel like fish out of water as they spend their last day in the Redwoods on a fly-fishing adventure. MJ and Destiney share a moment acknowledging their growth, while Reza struggles with news about Tommy. GG organizes a Wusah-inspired, spirit animal-themed dinner for the final night, but the tranquility only lasts so long. After the group questions Mike about his relationship status, he makes a shocking admission. As the Shahs prepare to head home, Reza writes a letter to Tommy in the hopes of taking a step forward.
127	14	"Reunion Part 1"	August 22, 2021	0.91
128	15	"Reunion Part 2"	August 29, 2021	0.84
