= PaVEM =

PaVEM, the Dutch government's Committee for Participation of Women of Ethnic Minority Groups (in Dutch: Participatie van Vrouwen uit Etnische Minderheden), worked from 2003 to 2005 to improve the access of and participation by ethnic minority women in social movements, and thus to facilitate minority women's integration into Dutch society. The committee is of interest internationally because so many countries are dealing with similar issues in their societies.

== Establishment ==
PaVEM was established in 2003 under the second Balkenende cabinet. The initiative was spearheaded by Rita Verdonk, then Minister of Immigration and Integration, and Aart Jan de Geus, then Minister of Social Affairs and Employment.

== Recipients of PaVEM awards ==
Halleh Ghorashi held the PAVEM chair in Management of Diversity and Integration at Vrije Universiteitfrom 2005–2012.

== Membership ==
Membership of the committee remained constant throughout its existence and comprised the following:

- Paul Rosenmöller, Committee Chair (former Member of Parliament and former President of the Green Left Party)
- Hans de Boer (former President of MKB-Nederland)
- Lilian Callender (Director of the School of Economics of INHOLLAND University; originally from Suriname)
- Hans Dijkstal (former Minister, former President of the VVD, former Member of Parliament)
- Crown Princess Máxima
- Yasemin Tümer (managing director of KPMG; originally from Turkey)

PaVEM was always intended to be a short-term committee with an emphasis on "speed and effectiveness"; according to one of its members, it was for this purpose populated with individuals who were expected to be able to get things done. Specifically, these members included the Argentinian-born Crown Princess Máxima, as well as two other immigrant women who had achieved a high level of educational and professional success, along with three powerful and experienced politicians.

== Strategies and Goals ==
Some of the main strategies of PaVEM were to improve minority women's access to employment; to remove barriers to their acquiring fluency in the Dutch language; to help municipalities engage more effectively in dialogue with immigrants; to reduce anti-immigrant sentiment, racism and oversimplification of immigrant issues in public discourse; and to develop a network of 'successful' immigrant women who could be mobilized to work on relevant participation projects. Tümer described the strategy as one of reaching the whole immigrant communities through the women of those communities, and described the group's vision as to "leave insight, action, examples, agreements, [and] inspired people."

== Conclusions and Transformation ==
At its closing meeting in 2005, the committee reported the following achievements: municipalities had established a "participation agenda," covering four key areas: language, work, social dialogue, and participation. Rural structures had also been put in place spanning public sector, private sector, and social movement participants. A national action plan had also been firmly set for the integration of the 240,000 women still lacking Dutch language fluency, including a program to bring language lessons to rural women in their homes. Finally, a Rural Participation Team had been established, composed of thirty socially and economically successful immigrant women who committed to be available as liaisons between rural immigrant women and various Dutch institutions.

The committee thus ceased to exist with its previous membership and as a government project, but a new NGO, a foundation called PaFemme, was formed to continue PaVEM's work. Its stated goal is to facilitate the participation of "black, migrant and refugee women" with "an emphasis on economic independence."

== See also ==
- Africana womanism
- Black feminism
- Postcolonial feminism
- Racism in the Netherlands
- Second-wave feminism
- Third-wave feminism
- Third World feminism
- Womanism
