= Mary and Robbs Westwood Cafe =

Restaurant in Westwood, California

Mary & Robbs Westwood Cafe

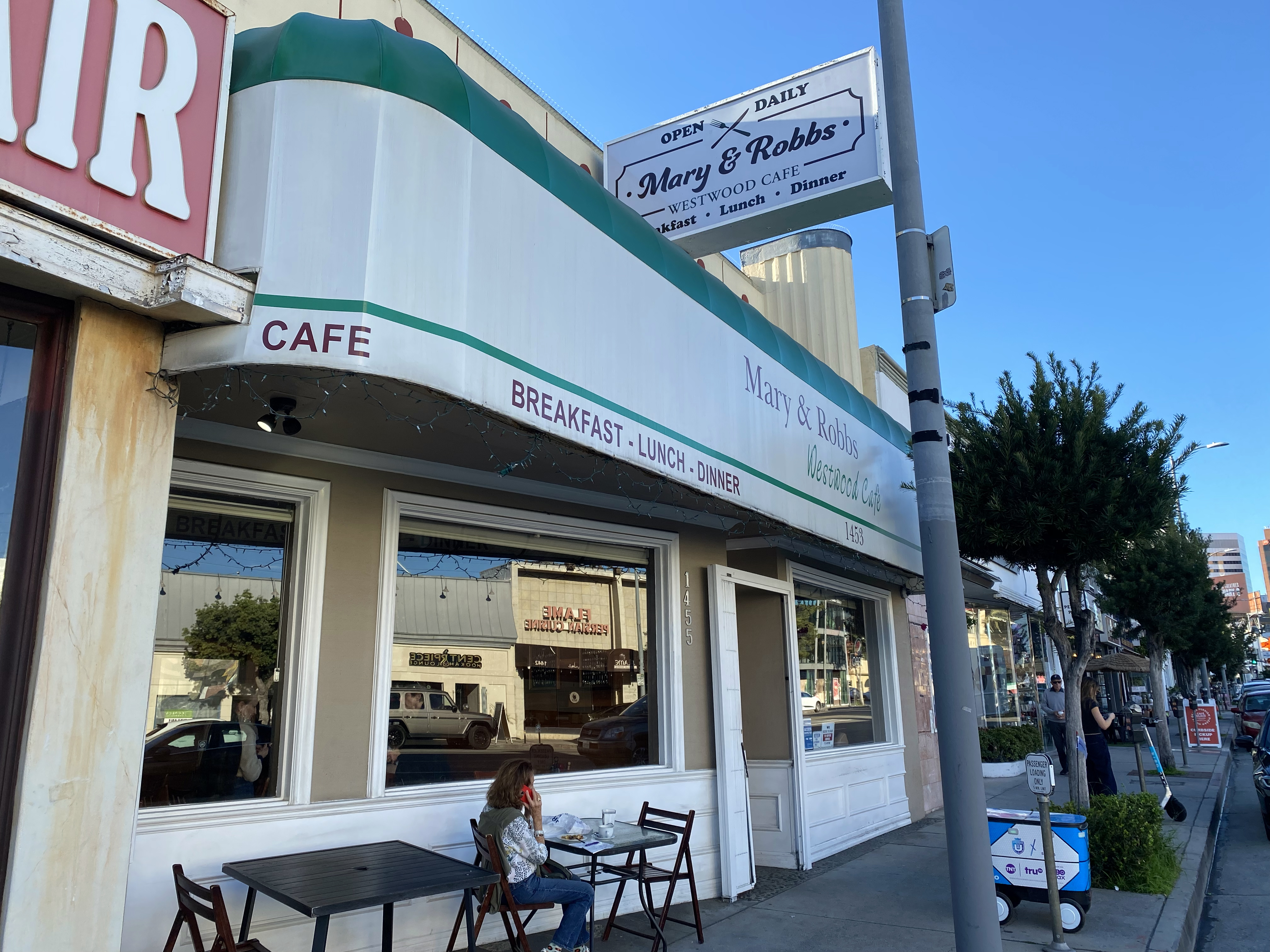
- Mary and Robbs exterior, 2026
- Industry: Restaurants
- Founded: 1950
- Headquarters: Westwood, Los Angeles
- Number of locations: 1
- Area served: United States
- Website: https://www.westwood.cafe

Mary & Robbs Westwood Cafe is an American restaurant which provides its customers with breakfast and brunch. Mary & Robbs is an American diner which focuses on casual dining.

== History ==
Mary and Robbs was founded in 1940's by couple named Mary & Robbs Singleton. The restaurant started as a soda shop. In the late 1960s, Mary & Robbs moved to a full service restaurant. The previous owner David Hekmat was dining in the restaurant in July 1979 for a business meeting, when the owner who knew David’s guest approached him and told him that he wanted to sell the restaurant.

In September 2020, its former owner David Hekmat transferred ownership to by Iranian-American entrepreneur Roozbeh Farahanipour. In July 2026, the restaurant's parent company filed for Chapter 11 bankruptcy protection.
