= Glorious Frontiers Party =

- Leader: Roozbeh Farahanipour
- Founded: 8 July 1998; 27 years ago
- Headquarters: Los Angeles, United States
- Ideology: Nationalism; Secularism; Liberal democracy

Party flag

Website
- marzeporgohar.org

The Glorious Frontiers Party (Persian: حزب مرز پرگهر, romanized: Hezb-e Marz-e Por-Gohar, taken from the first line of Ey Iran anthem) is an Iranian nationalist political party exiled in the United States. The party is banned in Iran.

According to Radio Free Europe/Radio Liberty, "Marz-e Por-Gohar was established in Tehran by a group of nationalist secular writers and journalists in 1998, but now some of them live in Los Angeles". Roozbeh Farahanipour, the party's leader and twelve other members were arrested in Iran student protests, July 1999.
