= Cyrus Shahabi =

Iranian-American computer scientist

- Born: Iran
- Education: Sharif University of Technology (BS, 1989); University of Southern California (MS, 1993; PhD, 1996)
- Known for: Geospatial information management; Spatial indexing; Spatial skyline queries; Spatial crowdsourcing; Location Privacy; Intelligent Transportation; Mobility Models; Spatial AI
- Awards: Okawa Foundation Research Grant (2001); NSF CAREER Award (2002); Presidential Early Career Award for Scientists and Engineers (2003); ACM Distinguished Member (2009)
- Honors: Fellow of the IEEE, NAI Fellow
- Scientific career
- Fields: Computer science; Information management
- Workplaces: University of Southern California

Cyrus Shahabi is an Iranian-American computer scientist and a 2003 recipient of the Presidential Early Career Award for Scientists and Engineers. He is the Helen N. and Emmett H. Jones Professor of Engineering and Professor of Computer Science, Electrical and Computer Engineering, and Spatial Sciences at USC. He is also director of the Integrated Media Systems Center and the Information Laboratory at USC. Shahabi’s research focuses on spatial and spatiotemporal data management, geospatial information systems, location-based services, mobility data, spatial crowdsourcing, location privacy, intelligent transportation systems, and spatial artificial intelligence.

== Biography ==
Shahabi received his bachelor's degree in computer engineering from the Sharif University of Technology in 1989, followed by a master's degree and PhD in computer science from the University of Southern California (USC) in May 1993 and August 1996 respectively. He currently serves as director of the Integrated Media Systems Center and the Information Laboratory at USC.

After completing his Ph.D., Shahabi joined USC, where he has held faculty appointments in computer science, electrical and computer engineering, and spatial sciences. He has directed the USC Information Laboratory since 1997 and the Integrated Media Systems Center since 2010. He served as chair of the USC Thomas Lord Department of Computer Science from 2017 to 2022.

Shahabi received an Okawa Foundation Research Grant for Information and Telecommunications in 2001, a National Science Foundation CAREER award in 2002, a Presidential Early Career Award for Scientists and Engineers in 2003, and the Association for Computing Machinery Distinguished Scientist award in 2009. He is a fellow of the Institute of Electrical and Electronics Engineers and National Academy of Inventors and is the author or co-author of more than 300 peer-reviewed articles. He received the ACM SIGSPATIAL 10-Year Impact Award in 2023. He chaired the founding nomination committee of ACM SIGSPATIAL for its first term (2008-2011 term). He was the chair of the ACM SIGSPATIAL (2017-2020 term).

== Research ==
Shahabi is best known for contributions to geospatial information management and spatiotemporal data systems. His work includes spatial indexing and query processing, road-network queries, Voronoi-based indexing, spatial skyline queries, geospatial data integration, participatory sensing, spatial crowdsourcing, location privacy, geo-social systems, ride-sharing, traffic forecasting, and mobility analytics.

His early work contributed to spatial network query processing, including road-network nearest-neighbor search and spatial skyline queries. With Mehdi Sharifzadeh, he introduced spatial skyline queries at VLDB 2006. He also contributed to TSA-tree, a wavelet-based index structure for time-series data, and the Clustered Aggregation technique for wireless sensor networks.

Shahabi’s later work coined the term spatial crowdsourcing, including the GeoCrowd framework, which introduced a taxonomy and query-answering framework for assigning location-based tasks to mobile workers. He has also worked on location privacy, including privacy-preserving spatial queries and privacy protection in spatial crowdsourcing. In intelligent transportation and mobility, Shahabi has contributed to traffic forecasting, routing, ride-sharing, and mobility modeling. His work with Yaguang Li, Rose Yu, Ugur Demiryurek, and Yan Liu introduced the Diffusion Convolutional Recurrent Neural Network, or DCRNN, for traffic forecasting, a graph neural network model that represents traffic flow as diffusion on a directed road network.

More recently, Shahabi’s research has expanded into spatial artificial intelligence, including mobility foundation models, learned spatial representations, privacy-preserving spatial data release, and neural approaches for spatial and spatiotemporal data management with theoretical bounds. His Google Scholar profile lists more than 35,000 citations.

== Systems and technology transfer ==
Shahabi has led or contributed to several spatial and multimedia data systems, including Yima, GeoDec, ProDA, GeoSIM, MediaQ, Janus, ADMS, and W4H. These systems address geospatial decision support, large-scale data analysis, participatory sensing, transportation data management, multimedia data management, and wearable-data acquisition and analytics. Several of these systems were transferred to or deployed by organizations including LA Metro, Chevron, NGA’s GeoQ, and NASA JPL.

He co-founded Geosemble Technologies, a geospatial data integration company acquired in 2012, and TallyGo/ClearPath, a routing and navigation company.
