= Shahs of Sunset =

American reality television series

- Genre: Reality television
- Starring: Reza Farahan; Mike Shouhed; Mercedes Javid; Golnesa Gharachedaghi; Asa Soltan Rahmati; Sammy Younai; Lilly Ghalichi; Asifa Mirza; Shervin Roohparvar; Destiney Rose; Nema Vand
- Country of origin: United States
- Original language: English
- No. of seasons: 9
- No. of episodes: 128 (list of episodes)

Production
- Executive producers: Ryan Seacrest; Steven Weinstock; Glenda Hersh; Lauren Eskelin; Lorraine Haughton-Lawson; Julie Lombardi; Eric Gardner; Chaz Morgan; Angela Rae Berg
- Camera setup: Multiple
- Running time: 42 minutes
- Production companies: Ryan Seacrest Productions; Truly Original

Original release
- Network: Bravo
- Release: March 11, 2012 – August 29, 2021

Shahs of Sunset is an American reality television series that aired on Bravo. The series debuted on March 11, 2012, and ended on August 29, 2021. The series followed a group of Iranian Americans living in Beverly Hills (and the greater area known as "Tehrangeles"), who are trying to juggle their active social lives and up-and-coming careers while balancing the demands of their families and traditions. It is the second American reality television show about Iranians after E!'s Love Is in the Heir in 2004. The series originally focused on Reza Farahan, Golnesa Gharachedaghi, Sammy Younai, Asa Soltan Rahmati, Mike Shouhed, and Mercedes Javid. Of the original shahs, Younai left after the first season and Soltan Rahmati departed after the sixth. The remaining shahs joined in later seasons, Rose and Vand in the seventh. Past shahs include Lilly Ghalichi (seasons 2–3), Asifa Mirza (season 4) and Shervin Roohparvar (seasons 5–6).

Work on the fourth season was underway when Ryan Seacrest Productions (RSP) and Bravo denied the show's post-production crew a union contract. The crew went on strike with the support of the International Alliance of Theatrical Stage Employees. Bravo fired the crew and the fourth season had been delayed. Eventually, RSP "ratified a union agreement, ending the month-long strike." The fourth season of Shahs of Sunset premiered on March 2, 2015. In June 2015, the show was renewed for a fifth season which premiered April 10, 2016. On October 27, 2016, the show was renewed for a sixth season which premiered Sunday, July 16, 2017. In April 2018, the show was renewed for a seventh season.

In January 2020, Bravo announced that Shahs of Sunset would return for its eighth season on February 9, 2020, with Destiney Rose, Golnesa "GG" Gharachedaghi, Mercedes "MJ" Javid, Mike Shouhed, Reza Farahan, and Nema Vand returning as main cast members. Sara Jeihooni joins in a supporting, friend role.

In April 2022, it was announced that Shahs of Sunset had been canceled after nine seasons. Reza Farahan, Golnesa "GG" Gharachedaghi, and Mercedes "MJ" Javid eventually joined its reboot, The Valley: Persian Style, which premiered in January 2026.

== Cast ==
Season 4 cast from left: Javid, Gharachedaghi, Rahmati, Farahan, Mirza, and Shouhed

=== Reza Farahan ===
Born in Tehran, Iran, in 1973, and raised in Beverly Hills, California, Reza Farahan is a real estate agent in Los Angeles. He works with MJ at Keller Williams Realty.

Farahan's father is Jewish, and his mother is Muslim. In an episode, he reveals his father converted to Islam to marry his mother. When his parents' marriage ended in divorce, his father moved back to New York City to be with his Jewish family; in an episode, it's revealed that Farahan's paternal grandmother pressured his father, and rejected Farahan because he was not Jewish.

Farahan is openly gay and has struggled with prejudice regarding his sexuality. He wanted to participate in the show after seeing news reports about the suicides of teenagers who were bullied because they were gay, and he wanted to help by portraying a positive image of a gay Middle Easterner. He is married to Adam Neely, a former fashion model who works in post-production on Ryan Murphy's shows. Farahan and Neely have been together since 2010, and their engagement was featured in the third-season finale of Shahs of Sunset. In season four, they call off their wedding after issues arise inside their group of friends following a fake rumor of MJ carrying the couple's child. The group continues on to the wedding trip to Thailand.

=== Golnesa “GG” Gharachedaghi ===
Gharachedaghi is an entrepreneur who begins the show unemployed and financially dependent on her father. She comes from a wealthy, nominally Muslim family. She lunches with her friends during the day and socializes at night. She has eight tattoos, including one on the inside of her lip. With a fiery, combative personality, she claims to have been kicked out of a number of schools while growing up due to fighting. Growing up she attended Jewish daycare, Catholic preschool and Loyola Marymount University. Her father is Mahmoud Gharachedaghi, architect and principal at GA Architecture and Planning, who appears on the show starting in season one. Over the second season, she launches "GG's Extensions", a brand of hair extensions, with her sister Leila. In December 2012 she told Andy Cohen that she was engaged to Omid Kalantari, who has a recurring role in season 2. The two broke off their engagement the following month.

=== Mike Shouhed ===
Shouhed is real estate agent in Los Angeles. He is a graduate of UCLA. After losing some money in the Las Vegas commercial real estate market, he has moved back home to rebuild. He and his family are Persian Jews. Shouhed married Jessica Parido on March 29, 2015 at the Biltmore Hotel in L.A. According to the documents, the couple separated on August 1, 2015, and less than eight months after they tied the knot, Parido filed for divorce from Shouhed on November 20, 2015 citing irreconcilable differences. Nearly a year after Parido filed for divorce from her ex-husband, a judge signed off on the divorce documents; the date of termination on their marriage is October 21, 2016. They share no children together. In July 2022, Shouhed was charged with 14 criminal charges stemming from an alleged domestic violence incident involving his fiancée Paulina Ben-Cohen.

=== Mercedes "MJ" Javid ===
Javid is a real estate agent living in the Hollywood Hills. She was born on August 16, 1972. MJ grew up conscious of her weight and was put on diet pills by a physician at age 14 in order to try to lose extra pounds, though she later quit them. MJ and her mother have a very difficult relationship and argue frequently on the show. MJ and her father, however, were very close before his death in February 2018. She works with Reza at Keller Williams Realty. She graduated with a Bachelor of Arts degree in English literature from California State University, Northridge in 2002. During the season 2 reunion, Javid admitted she is a felon, having been convicted of bank fraud in 1994. On April 21, 2018, Javid married Tommy Feight at the Jeremy Hotel in Los Angeles. On April 17, 2019, Javid gave birth to a son, Shams Francis Feight. She was taken to the ICU due to "complications" during labor and later revealed on Instagram that she "can never carry a baby again." MJ has a YouTube channel with her husband Tommy.

=== Destiney Rose ===
(Seasons 7–9) (friend in season 6)

Destiney Rose first became known to television viewers as one of the stars of The People's Couch. Destiney appeared on the show with her sister Cathy, and at the time was a general manager at a nightclub, where Cathy worked under her as a supervisor and bartender. As Shahs of Sunset began filming, Destiney was scaling back her life in the nightclub industry and working in party planning as she tried to get a more healthy work environment.

She got involved in Shahs being a good friend of co-stars Reza Farahan and Shervin Roohpavar. In an October 2018 Watch What's Happening Now episode, Reza claimed he has known Destiney Rose since she was 1 month old.

=== Nema Vand ===
(Seasons 7–9)

Nema Vand is a former talent executive turned bicoastal director. Vand joined the cast of Shahs of Sunset in season 7 (2018). Born in New York, but raised in Los Angeles, Vand has helped create award winning content for brands such as Adidas, Nike, Ford, Jordan, Target, Samsung, among many more. A relative newcomer to the group, Vand's career is now focused on directing original content in the digital media space. In 2021, Vand directed an acclaimed short film on the artist, Beeple. Vand speaks openly about having grown up without his mother or sister, his love for rosé wine, and reconnecting with his Persian culture. He graduated from UCSD and started his first company at 26.

=== Asa Soltan Rahmati ===
(Seasons 1–6) (guest appearance in season 7)

Rahmati is an entrepreneur and artist from Venice, California. Her paintings were published in the art book Imagining Ourselves, published by the International Museum of Women in San Francisco. Over the second season, she developed and launched Diamond Water, a bottled water that is alkaline water put in contact with diamonds before being bottled. She is from a Persian family; her parents and her brother, Arta, all appear on the show. Soltan Rahmati has been in a relationship with Jermaine Jackson Jr., the eldest child of Jermaine Jackson since 2010 and he has appeared in the second season. The couple gave birth to their son Soltan Jackson on January 20, 2017. She graduated from UCLA with a double major in Psychology and Philosophy. She claims her family left Iran as political refugees when she was a young girl; she grew up in Europe before moving to Los Angeles as a teenager.

=== Sammy Younai ===
(Season 1) (friend in season 2) (guest appearances in seasons 3–4, 7)

Younai is a residential developer in Beverly Hills, specializing in building multimillion-dollar homes. Sammy comes from a Persian-Jewish family. His family left Iran and moved to Florida when he was young, later moving to Beverly Hills when he was a teenager. During season 1, he worked with celebrity developer Mohamed Hadid on a 48,000-square-foot, $58-million house in Bel Air called The Crescent Palace.

=== Neelufar Seyed "Lilly" Ghalichi ===
(Seasons 2–3)

Ghalichi is an entrepreneur and blogger that other characters describe as a "Persian Barbie". She founded a lingerie-inspired line of swimwear known as Swimgerie that later merged with another swim line to be renamed Have Faith Swimgerie. She also founded her own line of eyelashes known as Lilly Lashes. Raised in Houston, Texas, she comes from a Persian Muslim family. Her sister Yassamin has appeared on the show, and her brother Mohammed is a cardiologist. She attended the McCombs School of Business at The University of Texas at Austin and Loyola Law School in Los Angeles, graduating in 2008. Ghalichi has had an on-again, off-again relationship with a Houston-based lawyer named Ali; after she graduated from law school in Los Angeles, they became engaged, and she moved back to Texas to live with him. They later broke up due what she described as bad habits, notably cheating on her. She also struggles with her conservative family due to her decision to leave law and pursue a career in fashion and beauty. She was the subject of controversy after joking during an episode that HIV/AIDS can be spread from a used pair of bikini bottoms and issued an apology. Ghalichi's involvement with the show was discontinued at the end of season three, having separated herself from the cast in season 3.

=== Asifa Mirza ===
(Season 4) (guest appearance in season 5)

Mirza has made appearances in seasons 4 and 5.

=== Shervin Roohparvar ===
(Seasons 5–6) (friend in seasons 4, 7–9)

Roohparvar is an entrepreneur from Silicon Valley who found success in the tech, nightlife, and retail industries.

=== Timeline of the cast ===
| Cast member | Seasons | | | | | | | | |
| Cast member | 1 | 2 | 3 | 4 | 5 | 6 | 7 | 8 | 9 |
|---|---|---|---|---|---|---|---|---|---|
| Reza Farahan | Main | Main | Main | Main | Main | Main | Main | Main | Main |
| Golnesa Gharachedaghi | Main | Main | Main | Main | Main | Main | Main | Main | Main |
| Mercedes Javid | Main | Main | Main | Main | Main | Main | Main | Main | Main |
| Mike Shouhed | Main | Main | Main | Main | Main | Main | Main | Main | Main |
| Asa Soltan Rahmati | Main | Main | Main | Main | Main | Main | Guest | | |
| Sammy Younai | Main | Friend | Guest | Guest | | | Guest | | |
| Lilly Ghalichi | | Main | Main | | | | | | |
| Asifa Mirza | | | | Main | Guest | | | | |
| Shervin Roohparvar | | | | Friend | Main | Main | Friend | Friend | Friend |
| Destiney Rose | | | | | | Friend | Main | Main | Main |
| Nema Vand | | | | | | | Main | Main | Main |
Friends of the Shahs
| Leila Gharachedaghi | Friend | Friend | Friend | | Friend | Friend | | Guest | Guest |
| Anita Gohari | Friend | Guest | Guest | Guest | Guest | Guest | | | |
| Adam Neely Farahan | | Friend | Friend | Friend | Friend | Friend | Friend | Friend | Friend |
| Omid Kalantari | | Friend | | | | | | | |
| Jessica Parido | | Friend | Friend | Friend | Friend | | | | |
| Bobby Panahi | | | | Friend | Guest | Guest | | | |
| Tommy Feight | | | | | Friend | Friend | Friend | Friend | Friend |
| Mona Vand | | | | | | | Friend | Friend | Friend |
| Sara Jeihooni | | | | | | | | Friend | |
| London Laed | | | | | | | | | Friend |

== Episodes ==
| Season | Episodes | Originally released | |
| Season | Episodes | First released | Last released |
|---|---|---|---|
| 1 | 6 | March 11, 2012 | April 15, 2012 |
| 2 | 13 | December 2, 2012 | March 10, 2013 |
| 3 | 16 | November 5, 2013 | February 25, 2014 |
| 4 | 16 | March 2, 2015 | June 15, 2015 |
| 5 | 17 | April 10, 2016 | August 3, 2016 |
| 6 | 15 | July 16, 2017 | October 29, 2017 |
| 7 | 15 | August 2, 2018 | November 29, 2018 |
| 8 | 15 | February 9, 2020 | July 26, 2020 |
| 9 | 15 | May 16, 2021 | August 29, 2021 |

== Reception ==
=== Community reaction ===
Before the show debuted, there was concern among the Iranian-American diaspora that Shahs of Sunset would promote an unwelcome image at a particularly tense historical moment. Firoozeh Dumas, author of Funny in Farsi, worried that "Americans have a chance to see a slice of materialistic, shallow and downright embarrassing Iranian culture. I just want to shout, 'We are not all like that!'" Two-time Mayor of Beverly Hills, Jimmy Delshad, voiced concerns that instead of showcasing the professional class of doctors, lawyers and business executives, the show would "take us back and make us look like undesirable people." Iranian American Novelist Porochista Khakpour took issue with the cast's self-description as "Persian" rather than "Iranian", but otherwise found the show to be just another reality television show in the "been-there-done-that Kardashian-Real-Housewives-Jersey Shore mash-up" with characters that reminded her of elements in those she grew up with in the diaspora. West Hollywood's City Council passed a resolution on March 22, 2012, condemning the show. Professor Gina B. Nahai lamented that the cast was "unattractive, unsophisticated, unproductive" and "consists entirely of every negative stereotype floating around this city about the community". Author and scholar Reza Aslan felt the concerns of the Persian community were overstated, commenting "Only the most moronic viewers would watch 'Shahs of Sunset' and extract an opinion about Iranians and Iran."

In response to criticism producer Ryan Seacrest dismissed the notion the series would cast the community in a bad light, describing the show as simply "escapism" that is "meant to be entertaining and fun." The president of Bravo described the cast members as representative of what the channel deems "affluencers:" 30-something, upscale, highly educated and influential."

The members of the cast have stated that they portray a more Americanized and modern version of Persians than those depicted in such films as 2012's Argo, where Iranians are depicted in ways they felt made them "savages" or "homeless people." Mike Shouhed has commented that the show's producers sometimes add to the confusion by using Arabic music on the show; Reza Farahan has received mistaken feedback complimenting Arab American culture.

=== Critical reaction ===
The show holds a 45 out of 100 score from Metacritic. Mike Hale's review in The New York Times commented that the show's characters "are a more diverting bunch than the high school football coaches and community activists of the well-meaning, admirable but prosaic All-American Muslim on TLC", but the "one really unfortunate thing about Shahs of Sunset is the way it exploits, and will in turn amplify, a previously localized phenomenon: the longstanding stereotyping of Los Angeles's Iranian-Americans as vulgar, materialistic show-offs who don't fit in among the city's supposedly more cultured elites." Tom Conroy of Media Life Magazine mentions that the show sparks some interest due to the cultural backgrounds of the cast, "but that is nearly outweighed by their dislikability." Verne Gay of Newsday described the show as "Another insufferable nose-pressed-against-the-glass reality romp that says the rich are just like you and me -- only rich, and exceedingly, tiresomely narcissistic." Linda Stasi of the New York Post wrote: "If the goal of Bravo's newest stereotyping gang bang, Shahs of Sunset, is to make Persians in LA look like egomaniacs, soulless bores whom you wouldn't want to spend five minutes with, let alone an hour, then they've succeeded."

== Lawsuits ==
=== Kathy Salem ===
Los Angeles resident Kathy Salem alleged she was subjected to "demeaning and humiliating" situations while filming in Shahs of Sunset. Salem has settled her lawsuit against Ryan Seacrest Productions. Per the settlement, she will be removed from the episode. Financial terms were not disclosed.

=== Labor dispute ===
On September 10, 2014, after receiving no response from Ryan Seacrest Productions (RSP) in reference to their pursuit of a union contract, the 16 post-production crew members of the series walked off of the job site. The Motion Picture Editors Guild (MPEG) called a strike against the show until it met the demands of its editors and assistant editors. On September 26, Bravo took control of the production away from RSP and fired the entire editorial staff. Firing employees who are engaged in "protected union activity" is illegal, which is why Bravo took control away from RSP and act as though the strikers were not employees of Bravo. In response, the International Alliance of Theatrical Stage Employees (I.A.T.S.E) "filed unfair labor practice charges against Bravo Media" and issued a press release saying, "Federal law protects employees' right to organize, including their right to strike. It is a violation of the National Labor Relations Act for an employer to retaliate in any way against employees for their exercising their rights under the law." "This is no longer just a fight about whether this crew gets health and retirement benefits," MPEG President Alan Heim said, "It's an unabashed attack on the right to organize." Picketing was called off on October 10 when RSP ratified a union agreement.

=== Kiara Belen ===
Kiara Belen, a former America's Next Top Model contestant, sued Bravo, Ryan Seacrest Productions and other defendants over a scene in which she appeared "nearly fully nude" while changing in a dressing room in a 2017 episode of Shahs of Sunset. She filed the lawsuit in Los Angeles Superior Court against Ryan Seacrest Productions, Ryan Seacrest Enterprises, Bravo Media, Truly Originals, and 50 unnamed defendants.

== See also ==
- Iranian Americans
- Tehrangeles
- List of Persian-language television channels
- Glendale Life, an Armenian-American reality television series with a similar concept, which has received backlash from the Armenian community for stereotyping
