= Roozbeh Farahanipour =

Iranian journalist

- Born: July 16, 1971 (age 54); Tehran, Iran
- Occupations: Iranian- American Activist, West Los Angeles Chamber of Commerce CEO, Businessman and Leader of the Glorious Frontiers Party

Roozbeh Farahanipour (Persian: روزبه فراهانی پور; born July 16, 1971, in Tehran, Iran) is an Iranian-American political activist, writer, and entrepreneur. He is the founder and leader of the Marz-e Por Gohar Party (also known as the Glorious Frontiers Party), a nationalist and secular opposition group dedicated to replacing the Islamic Republic of Iran with a democratic, secular government.

Farahanipour was one of the leaders of the 1999 Iranian student protests, and was arrested and sentenced to death by the Islamic Republic's Revolutionary Court. He later fled Iran and sought political asylum in the United States.

Since relocating to the U.S., Farahanipour has been active in political, cultural, and business circles. He is the owner of several restaurants in West Los Angeles, including Delphi Greek and Mary & Robbs Westwood Café, and is CEO of the West Los Angeles Chamber of Commerce. He has also held leadership roles in multiple civic organizations, including the Westwood Neighborhood Council, Westwood Community Council, and BizFed, and has been recognized with numerous civic and humanitarian awards.

Farahanipour is also known for his role as a spokesperson for the Iranian diaspora in the United States, appearing in media during the 2025 U.S.–Iran crisis to voice opposition to both the Islamic Republic of Iran and military escalation. He was in coverage by various news outlets including, the Los Angeles Times, BBC News, CNN, France 24, The Washington Post, and NPR where he advocated for a peaceful transition to a democratic Iran led by its own people.

== Early life ==
Farahanipour was born on July 16, 1971, at Tehran, Iran. He was the first child of Frank Farahanipour and Parvaneh Nasiri.

Farahanipour was a law student of at the University of Azad Tehran branch until 1993, when he was expelled on political grounds and banned from further education. In 1994 he founded a journal dedicated to Iranian Studies with an emphasis on Zoroastrianism entitled Vohuman. On July 8, 1998, together with his nationalist peers, some of whom had been involved with the Iranian Studies circle of Vohuman, Farahanipour organized the Hezbé Marzé Por Gohar ("Glorious Frontiers Party") named after the patriotic song suppressed by the Islamic regime. The Ministry of Intelligence declared Marzé Por Gohar an illegal party and denounced Farahanipour as a leader of the unrest. On July 14, 1999, his house was raided by armed Islamic militias. He was arrested together with twelve comrades and two Afghan house guests. During the course of 36 days in solitary confinement in the worst of the Islamic regime's prisons, the Towhid installation, Farahnipour was repeatedly tortured and interrogated by the Ministry of Intelligence and the revolutionary court. His personal testimony of torture was included in the United Nations' Report of the High Commissioner for Human Rights and Follow-up to the World Conference on Human Rights. He was eventually released on 50,000,000 Rials bail, which was paid with the deed to a compatriot's house.

=== Personal life ===
Farahanipour is married to Rana Pourarab Farahanipour. They have one child named Damavand Farahanipour.

=== Career ===
In 2009, after relocating to the United States, Roozbeh founded Ruzbehjon Inc, a restaurant management & consulting firm based in Los Angeles. He is the owner of Delphi Greek Restaurant. Farahanipour also owns the Persian Gulf Restaurant, Bakery, and Wine bar. He is also the owner of the Mary and Robbs Westwood Cafe.

In March 2014, he was appointed President of the West LA Chamber of Commerce. Farahanipour has been a member of: Westwood Village Rotary club, Westwood neighborhood council, Westwood community council, Los Angeles County Associate advisory board and California Restaurant Association. He also is a member of the board of BizFed.

== Life in the United States ==
In view of the extremely long prison sentences being received by other activists and the potential of execution, rather than waiting for the court to decide his fate Farahanipour chose to continue his struggle from abroad. He escaped Iran and sought political asylum in the United States. Now based in the Iranian expatriate community of Los Angeles, often referred to as Tehrangeles or Irangeles, Farahanipour continues his activism. He has owned Delphi Greek since 2009. Roozbeh Farahanipour was elected as a representative of the Business group to the then newly formed Westwood Neighborhood Council following elections held on June 26, 2010, with unprecedented massive participation of Westwood residents, business owners, students and UCLA faculty, employees, and those dependent on or using the services of the Westwood Community. He is a member of the West Los Angeles Chamber of Commerce, and is a member of the Westwood Village Rotary Club. In 2024, Farahanipour participated in efforts to commemorate Mahsa Amini and the Women, Life, Freedom movement in Los Angeles, attending the dedication ceremony for Women Life Freedom Square in Westwood, a public landmark honoring Amini's legacy and the global movement for women's rights.

== Books and Publications ==
- Who is The Dictator

== Awards and recognition ==
Farahanipour was awarded with the 2014 and 2015 California Hero Honoree award consecutively. He was also given the special congressional recognition on his installation as the President of the West L.A Chamber of Commerce. His story was recorded into the American Folklife Center at the Library of Congress which is also part of the StoryCorps. In 2017, Farahanipour was among the honorees of the Mental Health Heroes Award presented by The Chicago School of Professional Psychology, a nonprofit graduate institution in the United States specializing in psychology and related behavioral sciences. The award recognizes community leaders and advocates who contributed to mental health awareness, stigma reduction, and access to services.

== See also ==
- Human rights in Islamic Republic of Iran
- Tehrangeles
