= Halleh Ghorashi =

Anthropologist

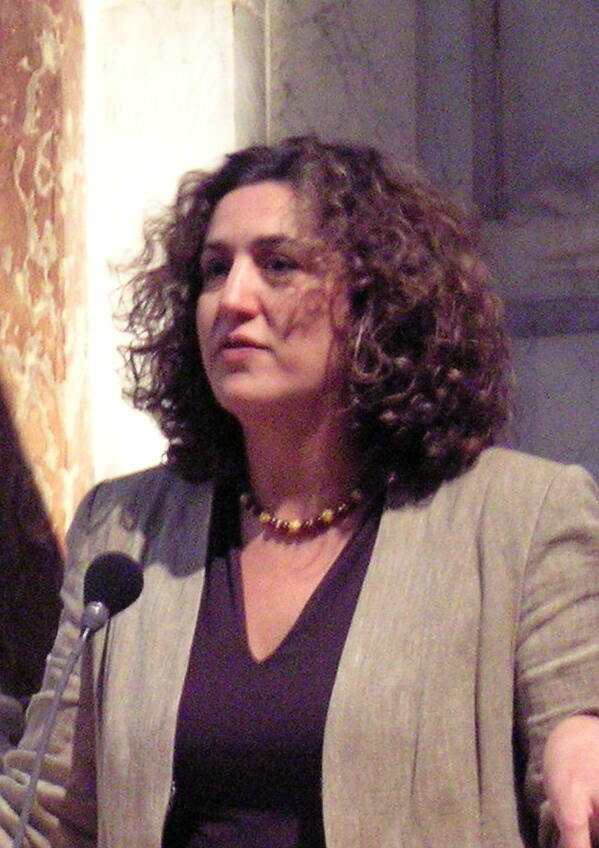
Ghorashi at the manifestation of Hans Dijkstal's Een Land Een Samenleving in Amsterdam, 2006.

Halleh Ghorashi (also spelled Ghoreishi; born 30 July 1962) is an Iranian-born anthropologist who lives in the Netherlands. From 2005 to 2012, she held the PaVEM chair in Management of Diversity and Integration in the Department of Organization Sciences at Vrije Universiteit in Amsterdam. She won the 2008 Triumph Prize (Prize de Triomf).

== Biography ==
Halleh Ghorashi was born on 30 July 1962 in Tehran, Pahlavi Iran (now Iran). She grew up in Iran, and came to the Netherlands in 1988 as a political refugee. She studied cultural anthropology at Vrije Universiteit Amsterdam, and received her Ph.D. at University of Nijmegen in May 2001, with a doctoral dissertation titled Ways to Survive, Battles to Win: Iranian Women Exiles in the Netherlands and the U.S. In 2005, she was appointed professor, and in 2006, she became the first occupant of the chair for Management of Diversity and Integration, endowed by PaVEM, the Dutch government's Committee for Participation of Women of Ethnic Minority Groups. Her inauguration was attended by Princess Máxima of the Netherlands, chair of PaVEM and was widely covered in the Dutch media.

In 2008, Ghorashi was co-organizer of a conference on the Muslim diaspora. In 2009, she was a speaker at a protest in front of the Binnenhof (Dutch Parliament Building).

Halleh Ghorashi is cited as a proponent of more inclusive political thought, countering the Dutch political climate of the early 21st century with its strong populist and anti-Islamic discourse. Ghorashi argues that when immigrants are maligned and excluded from political debate integration into Dutch society cannot be expected.

In 2010, Dutch feminist magazine Opzij listed her as one of the most powerful women in the Netherlands.

Ghorashi was elected a member of the Royal Netherlands Academy of Arts and Sciences in 2020.

== Publications ==
=== Books ===
- Ways to Survive, Battles to Win: Iranian Women Exiles in the Netherlands and the US. New York: Nova Science, 2003. ISBN 978-1-59033-235-1.
- The Transnational Construction of Local Conflicts and Protests Nijmegen : Stichting Focaal, 2006. OCLC 603051165
- (with Sharam Alghasi & Thomas Hylland Eriksen) Paradoxes of cultural recognition : perspectives from Northern Europe Ashgate, 2009. ISBN 978-0-7546-9585-1.
  - Review, by Dix Eeke, in Nations and Nationalism, 16, no. 1 (2010): 192-194.
- (ed. with Haideh Moghissi) Muslim Diaspora in the West : Negotiating gender, home and belonging. Ashgate, 2010. ISBN 978-1-4094-0287-9.

=== Papers and reports ===
1990s

- "Iranian Islamic and Secular Feminists: Allies or Enemies?" Series: Occasional paper (Middle East Research Associates), 27. 1996.

2000s

- Ghorashi, Halleh (June 2005). "Agents of change or passive victims: the impact of welfare states (the case of the Netherlands) on refugees". Journal of Refugee Studies. 18 (2): 181–198. doi:10.1093/refuge/fei020.
- Ghorashi, Halleh (August 2005). "When the boundaries are blurred" (PDF). European Journal of Women's Studies. 12 (3): 363–375. doi:10.1177/1350506805054275. S2CID 144772959.

2010s

- With: Szepietowska, E. (2010). "Diversiteit is niet alleen kleur in organisaties. Diversiteitsbeleid en –praktijk in de Nederlandse Goede Doelen Organisaties". Utrecht: UAF.
- With: ten Holder, F. (2012). "Kleine stappen van grote betekenis: een nieuw perspectief op humane opvang van asielzoekers " Amsterdam: Stichting de Vrolijkheid.
- With: Sabelis, Ida (March 2013). "Juggling difference and sameness: Rethinking strategies for diversity in organizations". Scandinavian Journal of Management. 29 (1): 78–86. doi:10.1016/j.scaman.2012.11.002.
- With: Ponzoni, Elena (2014). "Reviving agency: taking time and making space for rethinking diversity and inclusion" [Wedergeboorte van agency: scheppen van tijd en ruimte voor reflectie op diversiteit en insluiting]. European Journal of Social Work. 17 (2): 161–174. doi:10.1080/13691457.2013.777332. S2CID 14982545.
- Ghorashi, Halleh (March–April 2014). "Bringing polyphony one step further: Relational narratives of women from the position of difference". Women's Studies International Forum. 43: 59–66. doi:10.1016/j.wsif.2013.07.019.
