= Tehrangeles =

Persian district of Los Angeles, California

Coordinates: 34°03′21″N 118°25′54″W

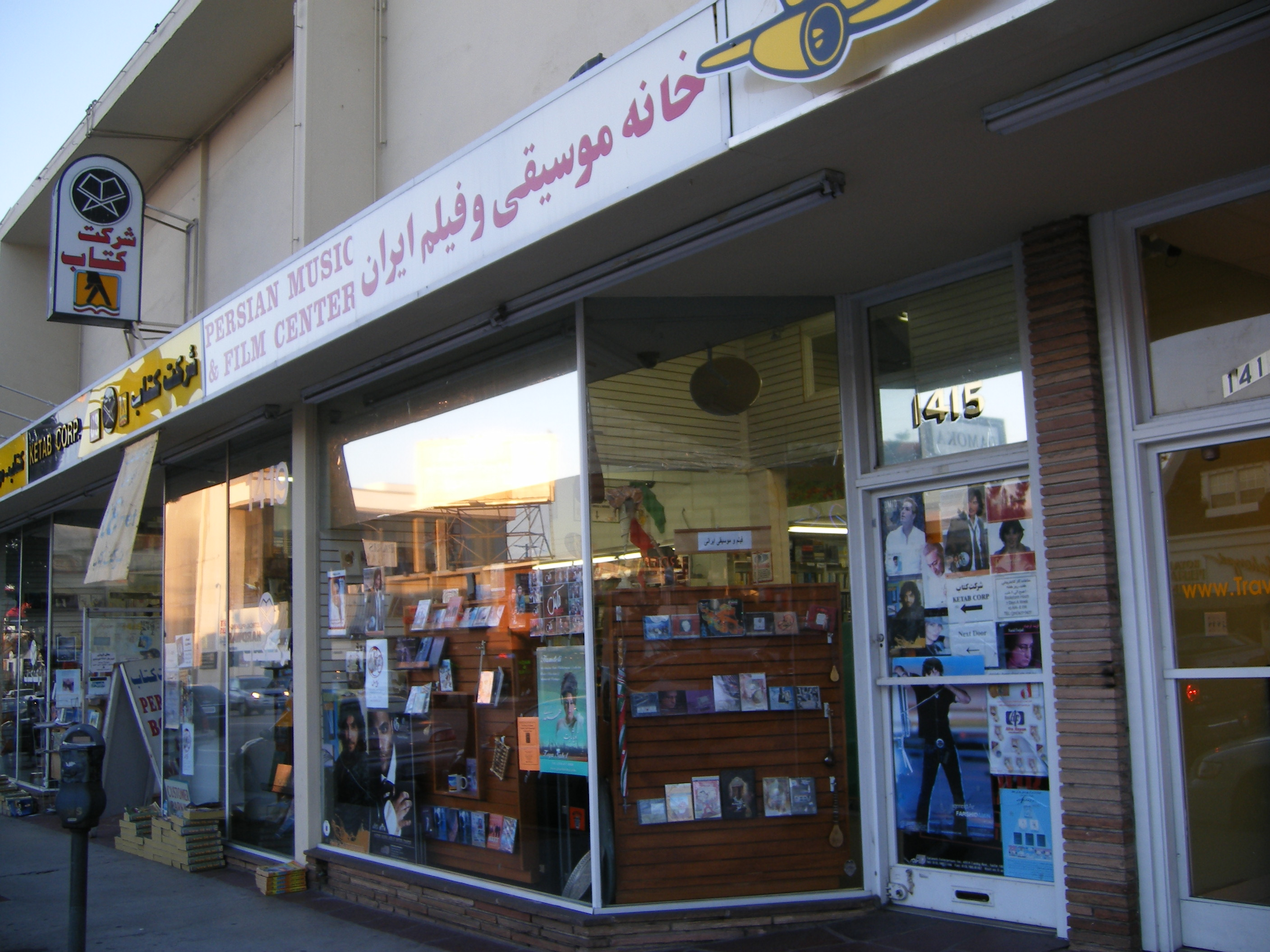
Iranian shops along Westwood Boulevard in South Westwood. Westwood is also known as "Little Iran/Persia".

Tehrangeles (Persian: تهرانجلس) is a portmanteau deriving from the combination of Tehran, the capital of Iran, and Los Angeles. Also known as Little Iran or Little Persia, a sprawl of Persian community developed in the Los Angeles area generally consisting of Westwood, Beverly Hills, Century City, West Los Angeles, Pico-Robertson, Bel Air, Encino, Tarzana, & Woodland Hills after the Islamic Revolution of 1979 prompted hundreds of thousands of Iranians to flee to the United States. It is a shopping, eating and gathering place for the large number (estimates range from 500,000–600,000) of Iranian-Americans and their descendants residing in the Los Angeles metropolitan area, the largest such community outside of Iran.

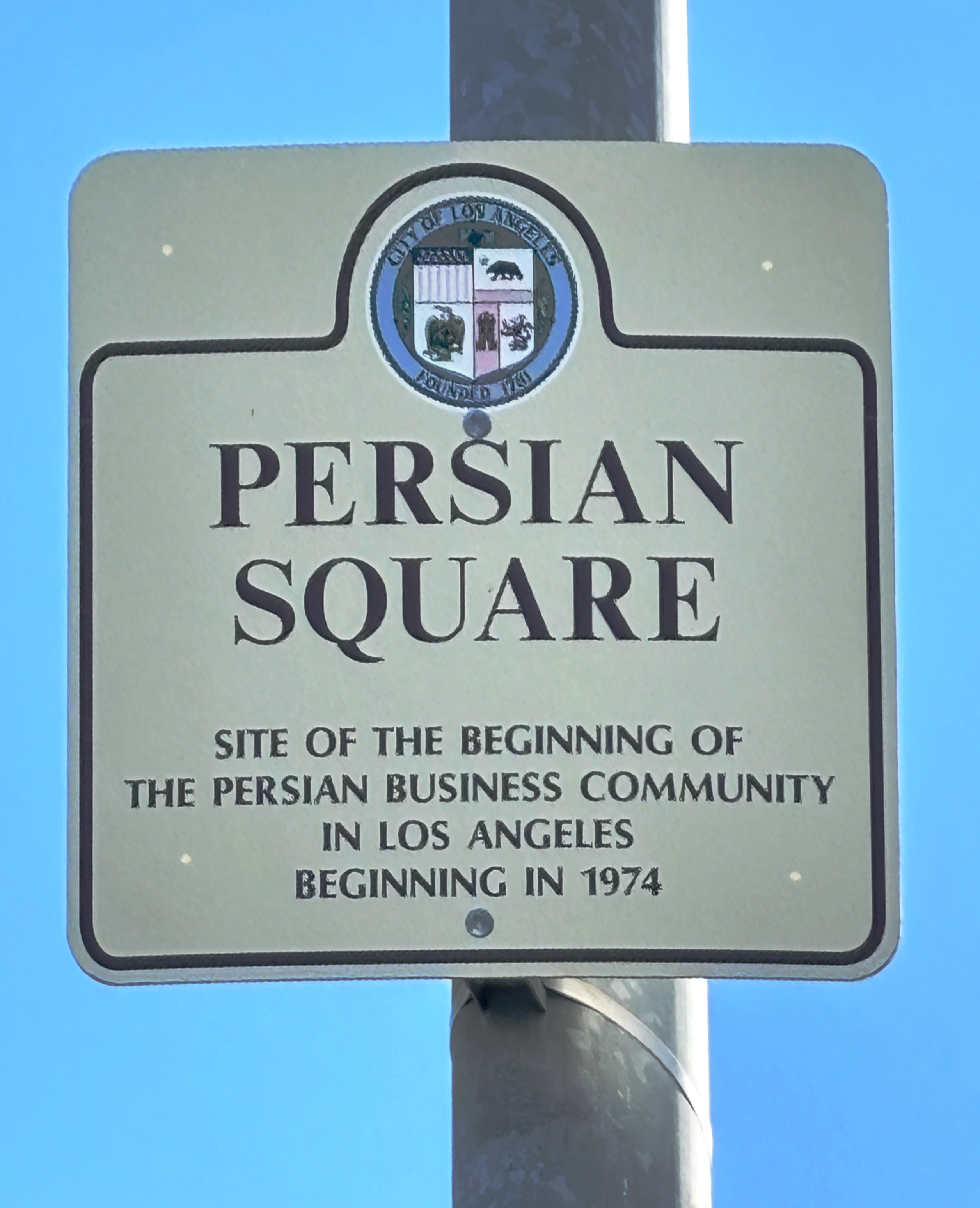
Persian Square

The intersection of Westwood Boulevard and Wilkins Avenue was recognized by the City of Los Angeles as Persian Square.

== Origin ==
A Persian community originally centered in the Westwood neighborhood of the Westside in the 1960s. Immigration to the area increased several-fold due to the events surrounding the 1979 Revolution in Iran. Westwood Boulevard became known for its many Persian shops and restaurants including being a gathering place for men in restaurants and tea shops. The Iranian expatriate community of Los Angeles entered a wide variety of media including magazines, newspapers, radio, and television stations and contributed greatly to production of modern global Iranian culture while in diaspora.

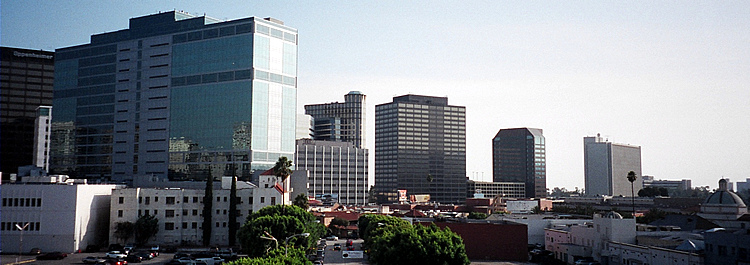
Westwood skyline

== Distribution ==
As the population has grown, Iranians and their American-born children have settled in neighborhoods throughout Los Angeles, including Tarzana, Woodland Hills, Westwood, Encino, Bel Air, and Beverly Hills, as well as the cities of Irvine, Huntington Beach and elsewhere in Orange County. Additionally, a growing Iranian community exists in the Inland Empire, centered in Eastvale, Rancho Cucamonga, Chino Hills, Riverside, Corona, and Temecula. They have also made their homes in San Diego and the Palm Springs area of the Coachella Valley.

== Economy ==
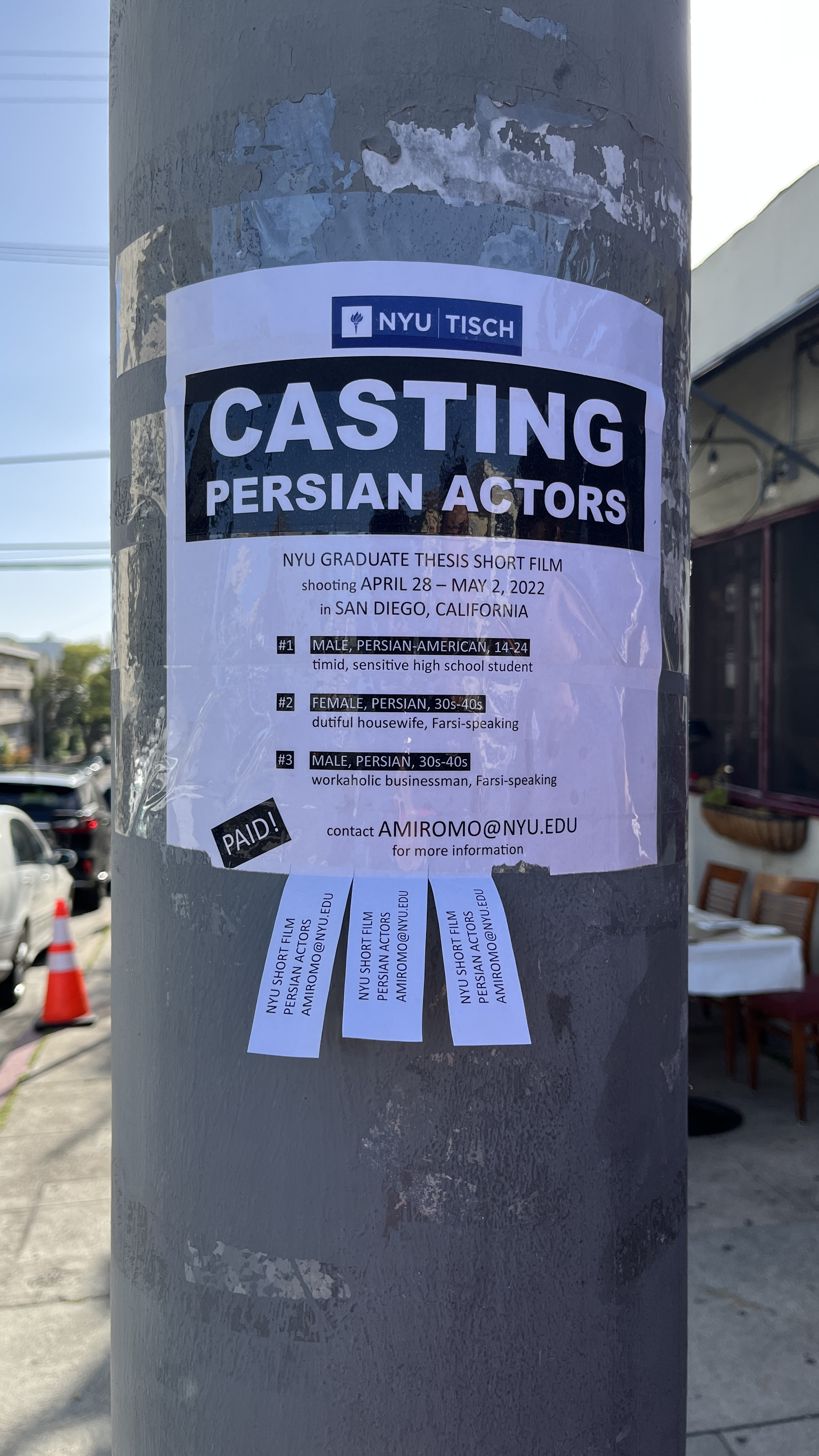
A flyer in Westwood, Los Angeles, seeking Persian actors for a film

The economy of Tehrangeles demonstrates key features of ethnic enclave economics, providing a wider range of employment opportunities than the general market by virtue of its cultural (Iranian) specificity, and as such provides a feasible method for Iranian immigrants to find employment and economic integration.

Tehrangeles is home to a sizable community of Iranian immigrant entrepreneurs who own their own businesses. Business signs are commonly in Persian, which is also spoken in the shops. Iranian-owned businesses are particularly prevalent on Westwood Boulevard between Wilshire Boulevard in Westwood to Pico Boulevard.

== See also ==
- History of Iranian Americans in Los Angeles
- Iranian Americans
- Iranian diaspora
- Freedom Sculpture
- Roozbeh Farahanipour
