= Integrated Media Systems Center =

US research center

Coordinates: 34.019138°N 118.288819°W

The Integrated Media Systems Center (IMSC) is on the campus of the University of Southern California, United States. It was founded using a grant from the US National Science Foundation in 1996 for the study of Integrated Media Systems. The original mission was focused on the advancement the integration of digital video, immersive audio, text, animation and graphics to transform the way people work, communicate, learn, teach, entertain and play. By using cross-disciplinary programs of research and education, the Center has taken multimedia to a new level of technological sophistication.
