= Henry Hammel =

Henry Hammel may refer to:

- Henry Hammel (California businessman) (1833/1834–1890), businessman and politician
- Henry A. Hammel (1840–1902), Union Army soldier and Medal of Honor recipient
