= Beverly Hills, California =

- City
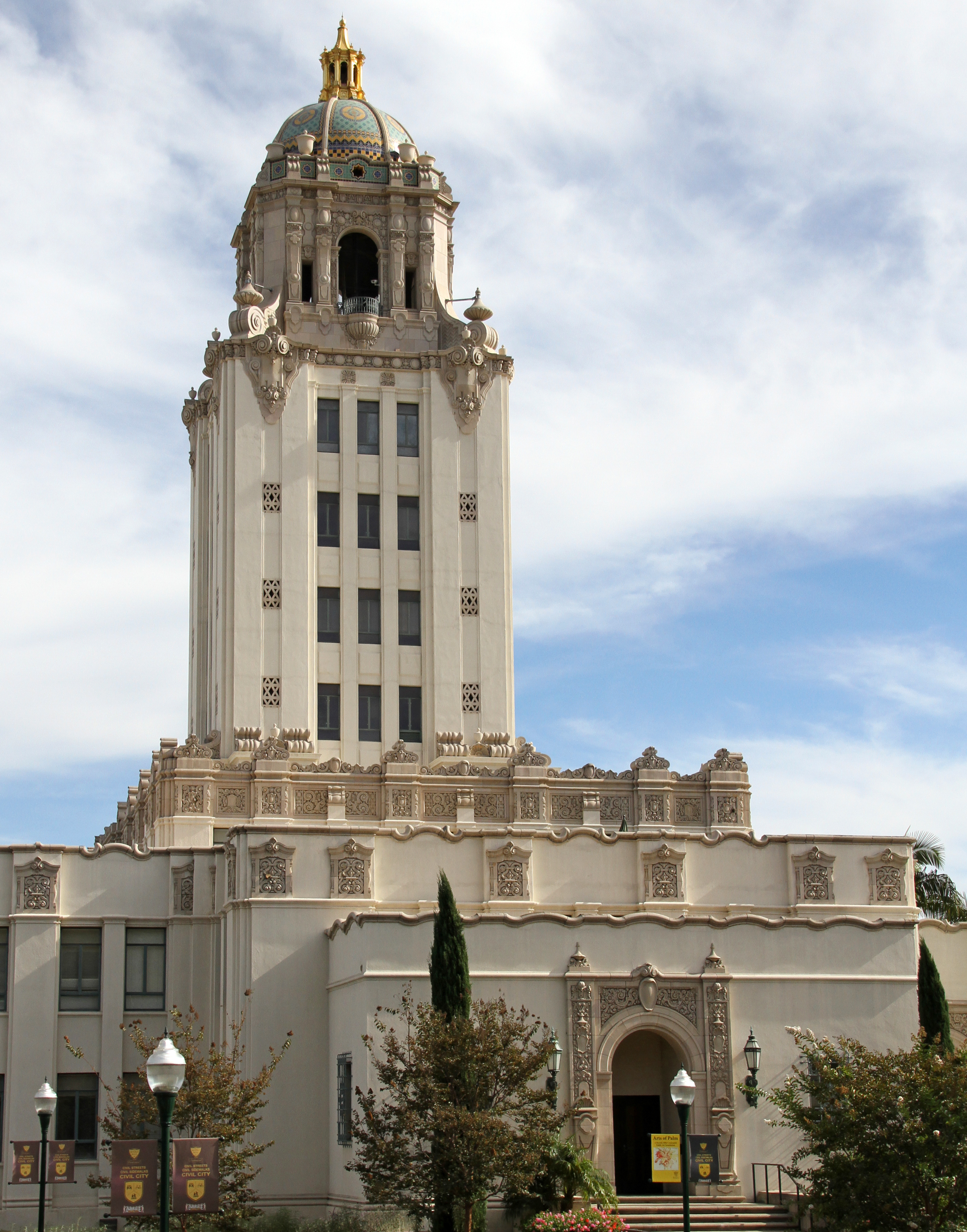
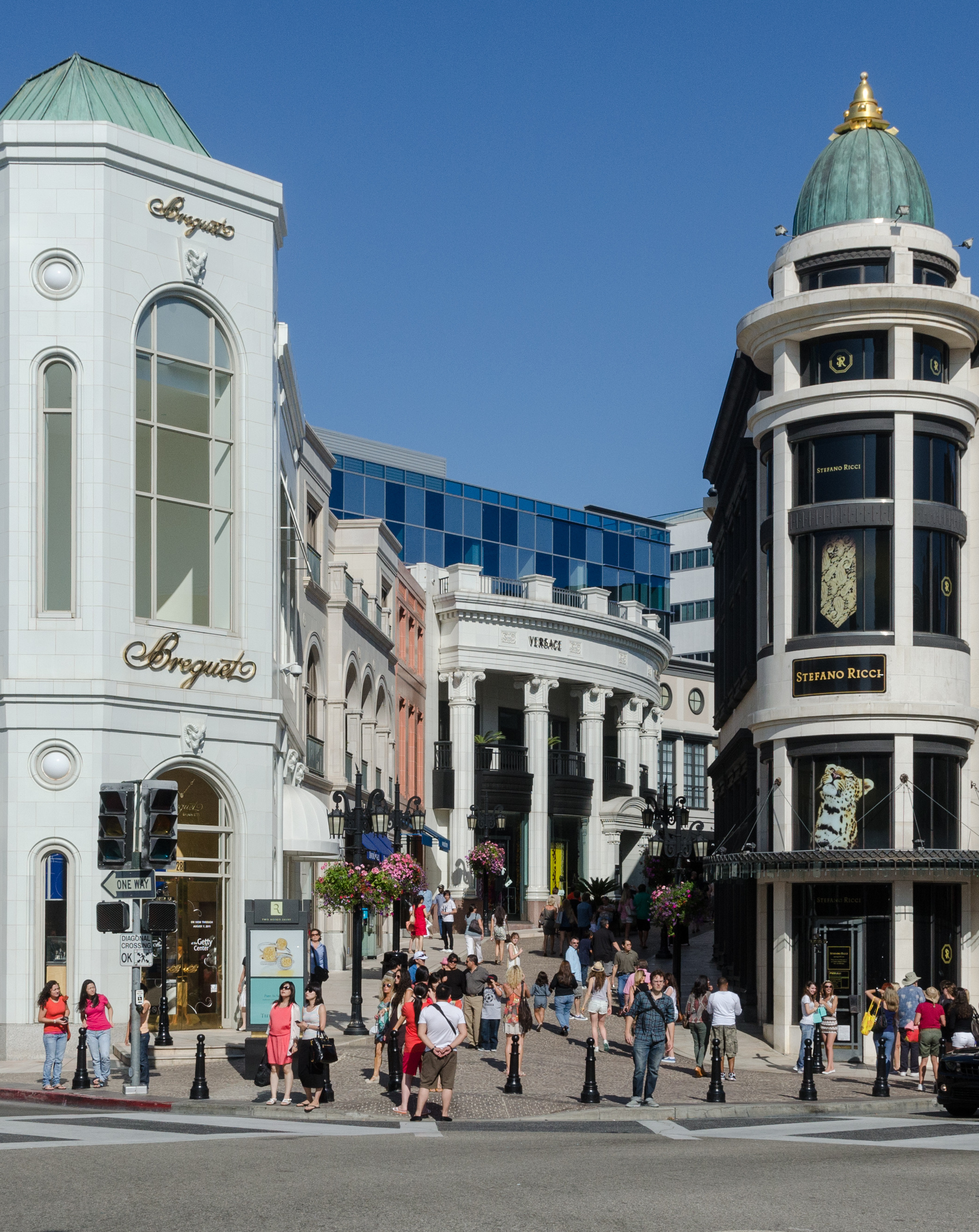
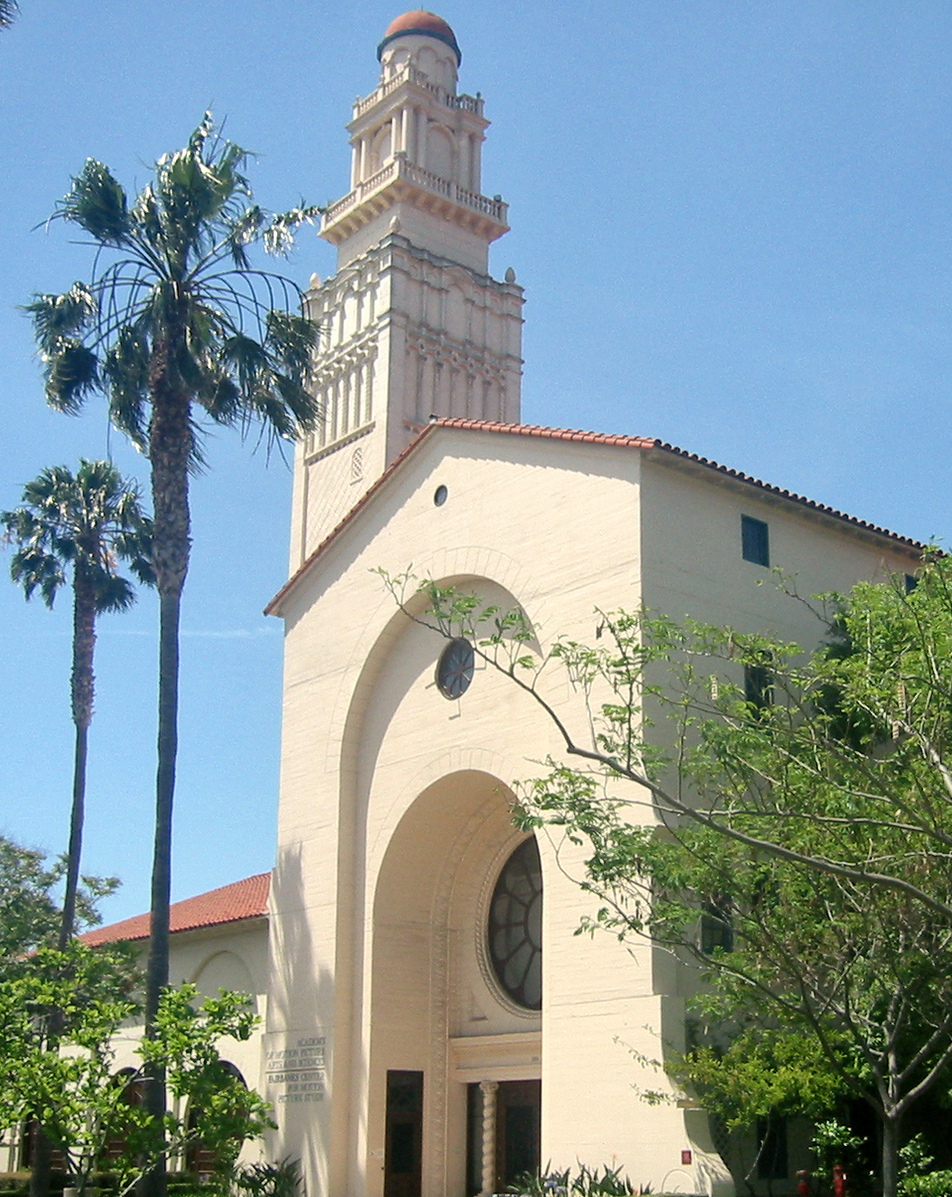
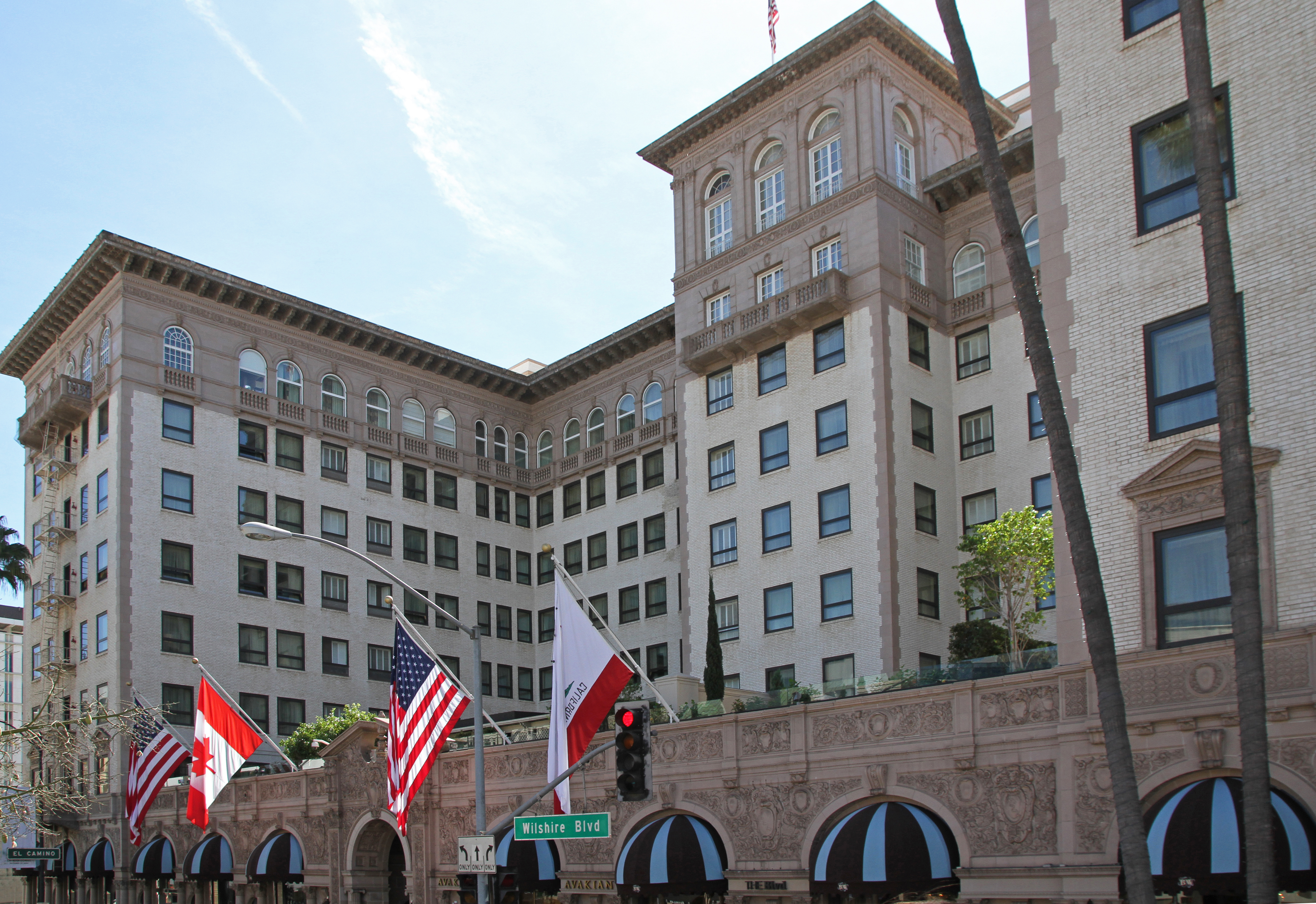
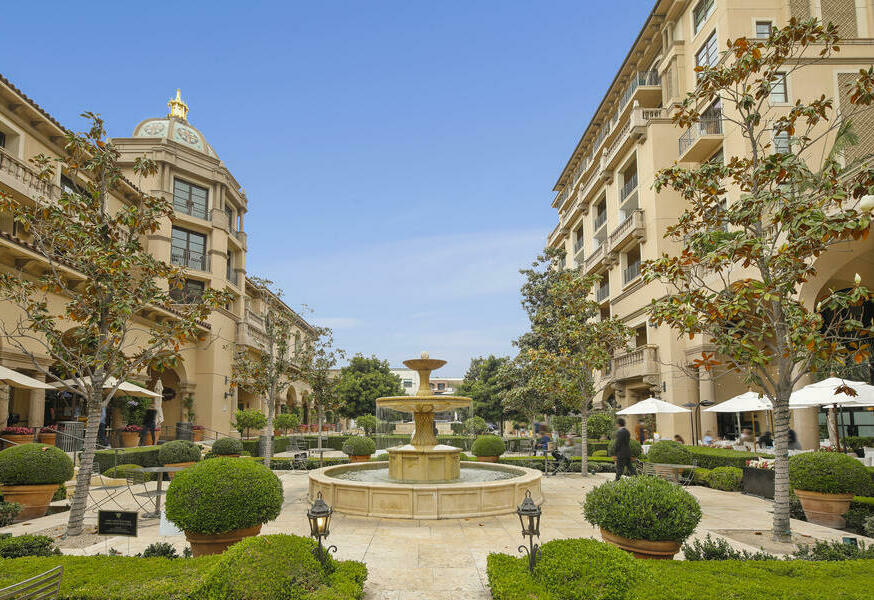
- Beverly Hills City Hall Rodeo Drive Motion Picture Academy Beverly Wilshire Hotel Beverly Cañon Gardens

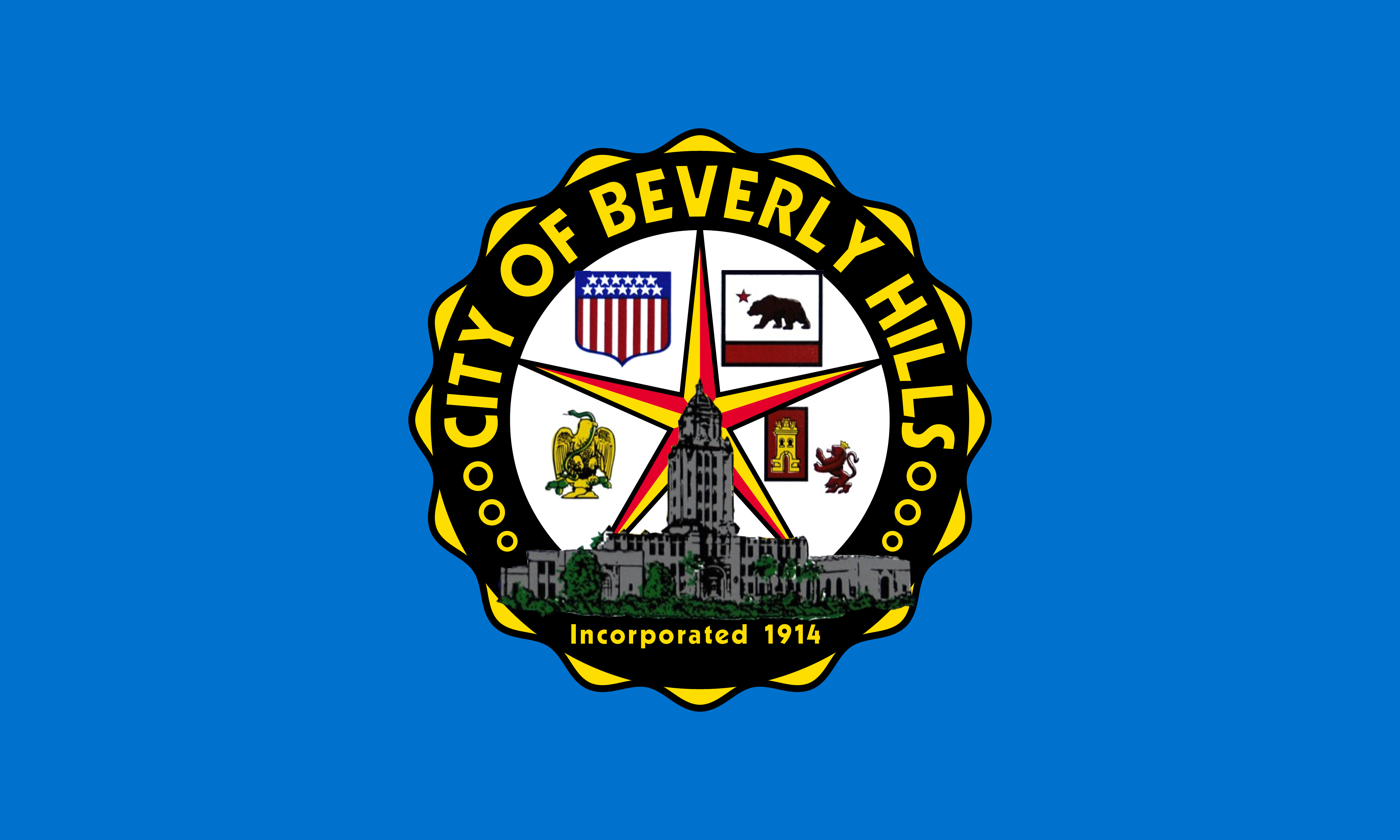
- Flag Seal Shield
- Nicknames: "Garden Spot of the World," "B.H.," "Bev Hills," "90210"
- Interactive map of Beverly Hills, California
- Location within the Los Angeles metropolitan area Location within California Location within the United States
- Coordinates: 34°4′23″N 118°23′58″W
- Country: United States
- State: California
- County: Los Angeles
- Incorporated: January 28, 1914
- Named for: Beverly Farms in Beverly, Massachusetts

Government
  - Type: Council–manager
  - Mayor: Craig Corman
  - Vice Mayor: Mary Wells
  - City council: Lester Friedman, Sharona Nazarian, Rebecca Pynoos
  - City manager: Ryan Gohlich

Area
  - Total: 5.71 sq mi (14.79 km^{2})
  - Land: 5.71 sq mi (14.78 km^{2})
  - Water: 0 sq mi (0.00 km^{2}) 0.04%
- Elevation: 259 ft (79 m)

Population (2020)
  - Total: 32,701
  - Estimate (2024): 31,027 ▼
  - Density: 5,730/sq mi (2,212/km^{2})
- Time zone: UTC−8 (Pacific)
  - Summer (DST): UTC−7 (PDT)
- ZIP codes: 90209–90213
- Area codes: 310/424, 323
- FIPS code: 06-06308
- GNIS feature IDs: 1652672, 2409840
- Website: beverlyhills.org

Beverly Hills is a city in Los Angeles County, California, United States. It is located southwest of the Hollywood Hills, approximately 12.2 miles (19.6 km) northwest of downtown Los Angeles. The city's land area totals 5.71 square miles (14.8 km^{2}) and (together with the neighboring smaller city of West Hollywood to the east) is entirely surrounded by the city of Los Angeles. According to the 2020 census, the city has a population of 32,701, marking a decrease of 1,408 from the 2010 census count of 34,109.

In American popular culture, Beverly Hills has been known as an affluent suburb within Greater Los Angeles, which corresponds to higher property values and taxes in the area. The city is well known for its Rodeo Drive shopping district that includes many designer brands. Throughout its history, the city has been home to many celebrities. It is noted for numerous hotels and resorts, including the Beverly Hilton and the Beverly Hills Hotel. The city has been featured in many movies, television series, music, and media, in the United States and internationally.

After its initial settlement in 1828, Beverly Hills was originally a primarily agricultural community centered around Rancho Rodeo de las Aguas, a Mexican-era rancho grant. Beverly Hills was first incorporated as a city in September 1914 by a group of investors who had failed to find oil but found water instead, and eventually decided to develop it into a town.

== History ==
The land was originally home to the Tongva tribe.

=== Early history ===
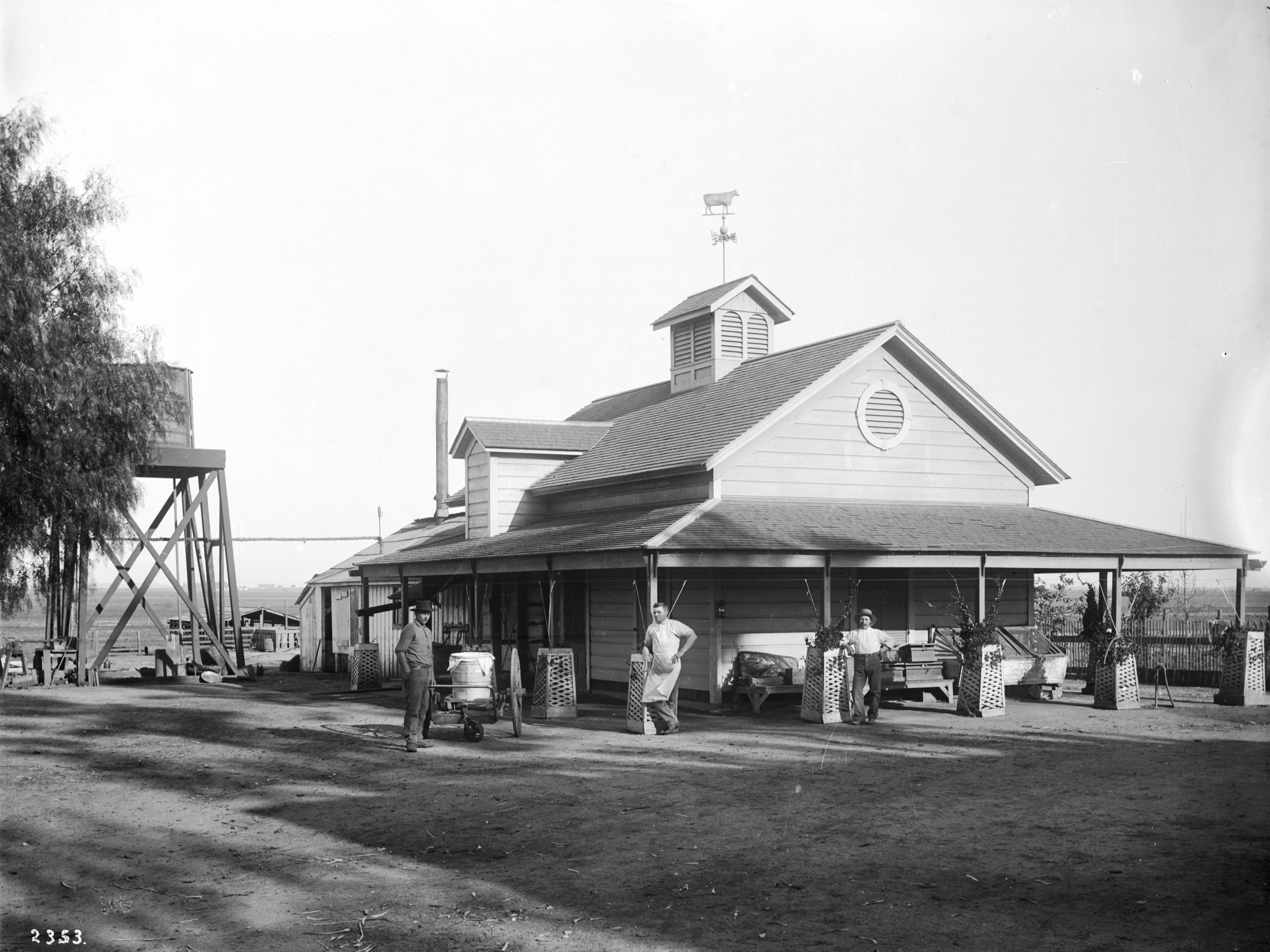
Rancho Rodeo de las Aguas c. 1905, when it was owned by Henry Hammel and Andrew H. Denker

Gaspar de Portolá arrived in the area that would later become Beverly Hills on August 3, 1769, traveling along native trails which followed the present-day route of Wilshire Boulevard. The area was settled by Californio ranchera María Rita Quinteros de Valdez and her husband in 1828. They called their 4,500 acres (18 km^{2}) of property the Rancho Rodeo de las Aguas. In 1854, she sold the ranch to Benjamin Davis Wilson (1811–1878) and Henry Hancock (1822–1883). By the 1880s, the ranch had been subdivided into parcels of 75 acres (0.30 km^{2}) and was being rapidly bought up by Anglos from Los Angeles and the East coast.

Henry Hammel and Andrew H. Denker acquired most of it and used it for farming lima beans. At this point, the area was known as the Hammel and Denker Ranch. By 1888, they were planning to build a town called Morocco on their holdings.

=== 20th century ===
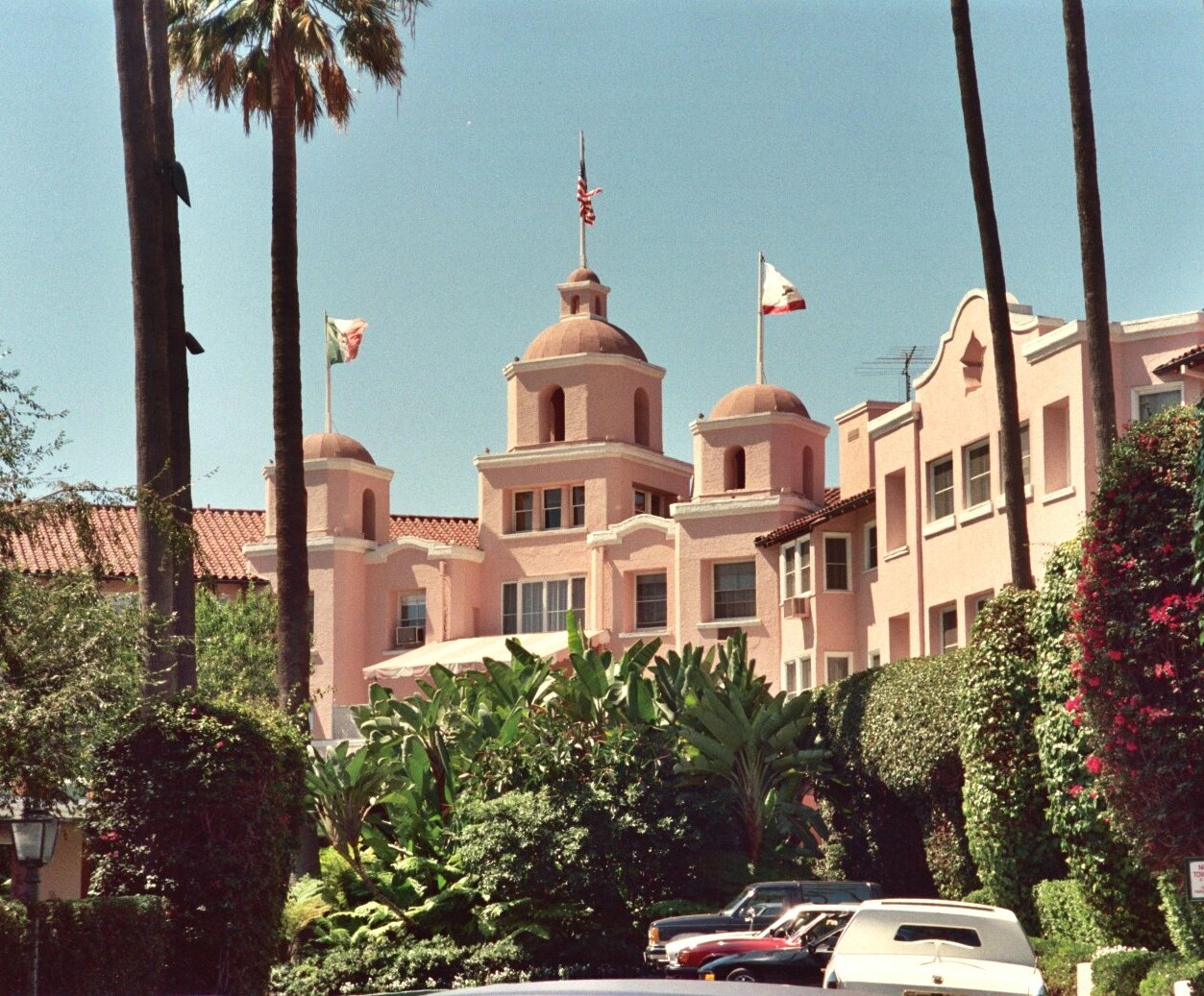
The Beverly Hills Hotel was the first substantial building project in what developed into Beverly Hills.

In 1900, Burton E. Green, Charles A. Canfield, Max Whittier, Frank H. Buck, Henry E. Huntington, William G. Kerckhoff, William F. Herrin, W.S. Porter, and Frank H. Balch formed the Amalgamated Oil Company, bought the Hammel and Denker ranch, and began looking for oil. They did not find enough to exploit commercially by the standards of the time, though. In 1906, therefore, they reorganized as the Rodeo Land and Water Company, renamed the property "Beverly Hills", subdivided it, and began selling lots. The development was named "Beverly Hills" after Beverly Farms in Beverly, Massachusetts, and because of the hills in the area.

The Los Angeles Times reported on September 2, 1906:

Percy H. Clark Company are managing the development of the foothill portion of the Hammel & Denker ranch for the Rodeo Land and Water Company (the Canfield-Huntington-Kerckhoff syndicate), to be known as Beverly Hills. No expense is being spared to make this a fine suburban district. . . . The property has been laid out on beautiful curved lines.

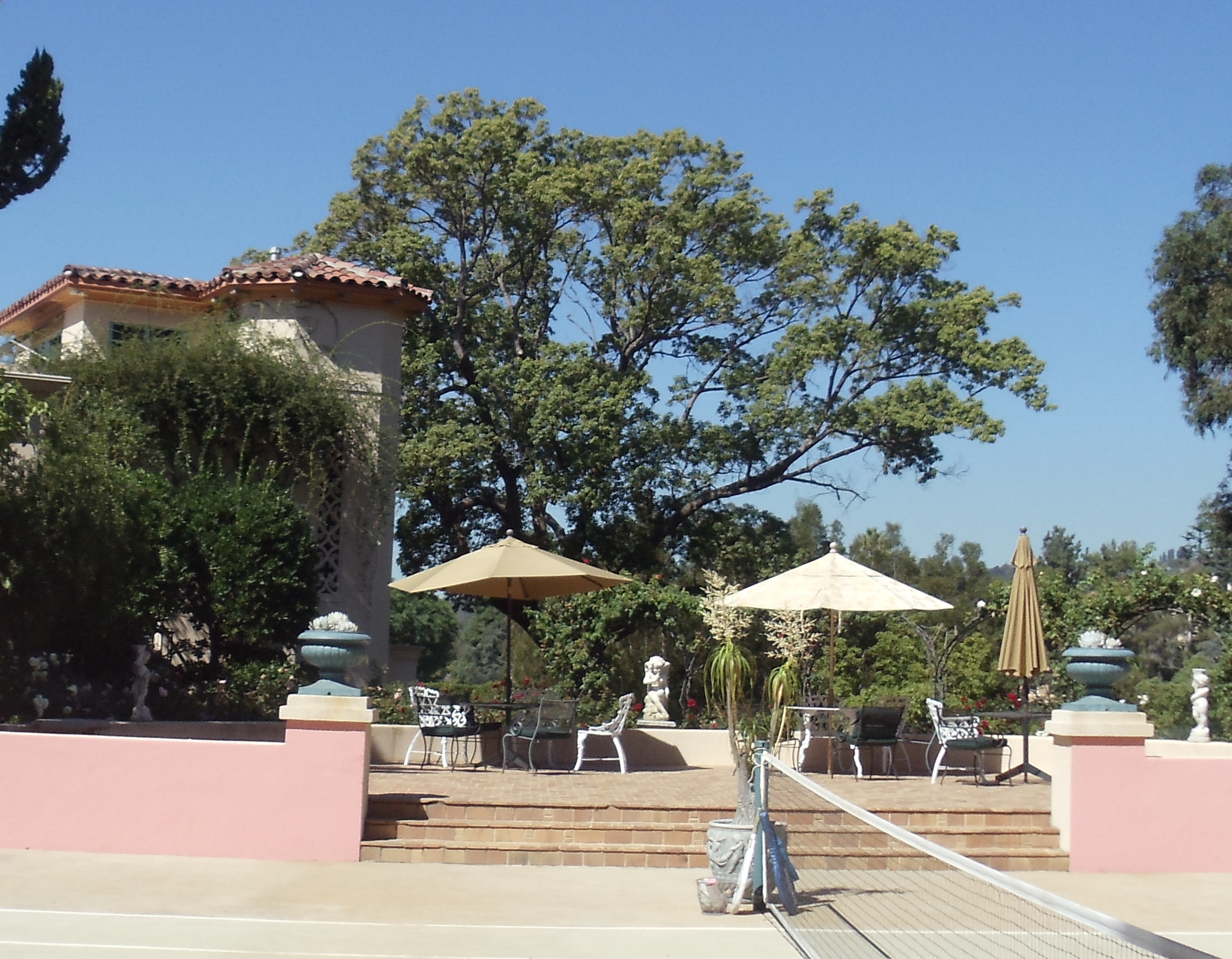
The Virginia Robinson Estate & Gardens, built in 1911 by the heiress of J. W. Robinson's, is open to the public.

The first house in the subdivision was built in 1907, but sales remained slow.

==== Restrictive covenants ====
Beverly Hills was one of many all-white planned communities started in the Los Angeles area around this time. Restrictive covenants prohibited non-whites from owning or renting property, unless they were employed as servants by white residents. It was also forbidden to sell or rent property to Jews in Beverly Hills.

==== Incorporation ====
Burton Green began construction on The Beverly Hills Hotel in 1911. The hotel was finished in 1912. The visitors drawn by the hotel were inclined to purchase land in Beverly Hills, and by 1914 the population had grown enough to qualify for incorporation as an independent city. That same year, the Rodeo Land and Water Company decided to separate its water business from its real estate business. The Beverly Hills Utility Commission was split off from the land company and incorporated in September 1914, buying all of the utilities-related assets from the Rodeo Land and Water Company.

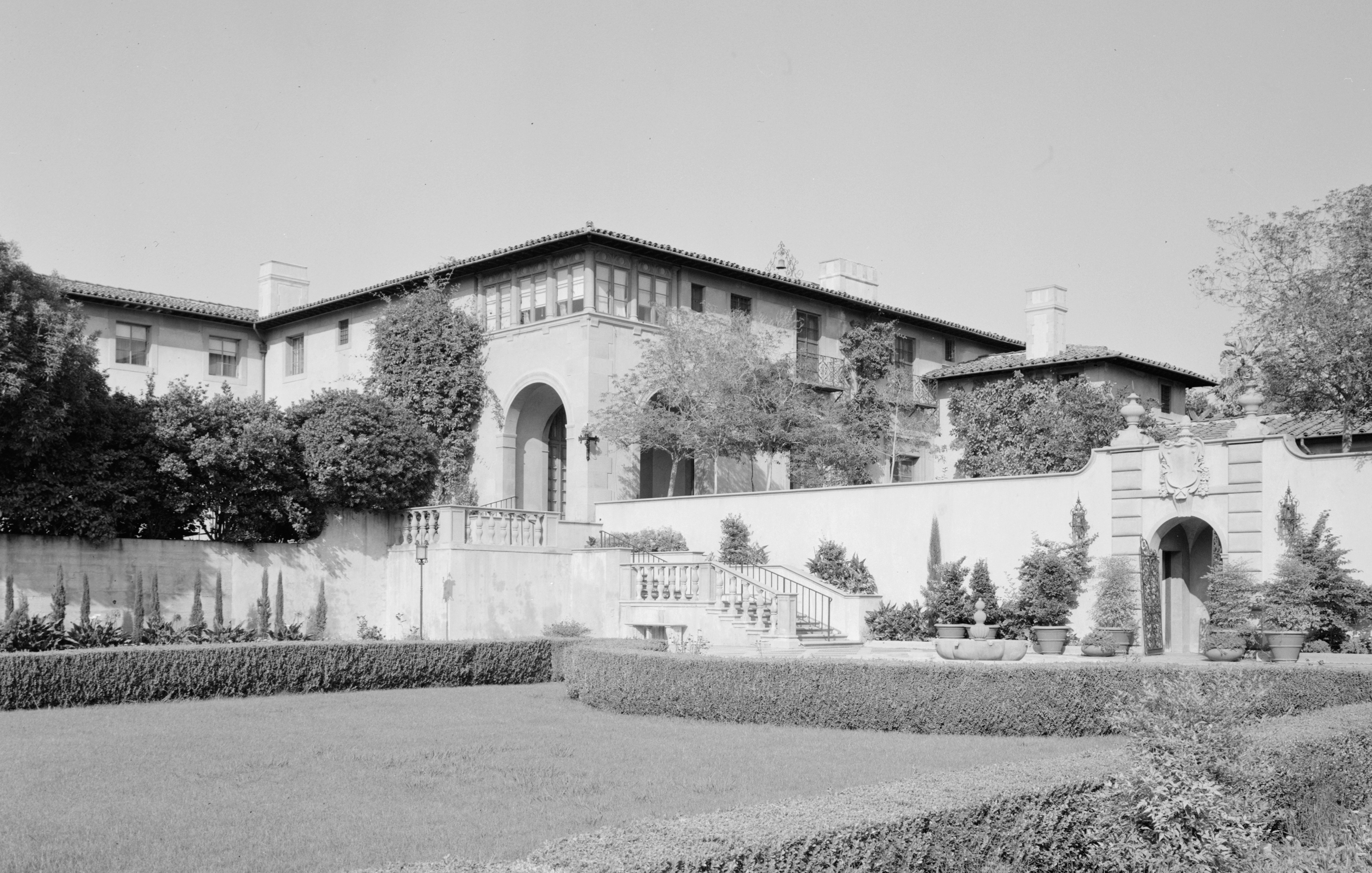
Greenacres, a historic estate built in 1918 by silent movie star Harold Lloyd

In 1919, Douglas Fairbanks and Mary Pickford bought land on Summit Drive and built a mansion, finished in 1921 and nicknamed "Pickfair" by the press. The glamour associated with Fairbanks and Pickford as well as other movie stars who built mansions in the city contributed to its growing appeal.

==== Water supply ====
By the early 1920s, the population of Beverly Hills had grown enough to make the water supply a political issue. In 1923, the usual solution, annexation to the city of Los Angeles, was proposed. There was considerable opposition to annexation among such famous residents as Pickford, Fairbanks, Will Rogers and Rudolph Valentino. The Beverly Hills Utility Commission, opposed to annexation as well, managed to force the city into a special election and the plan was defeated 337 to 507.

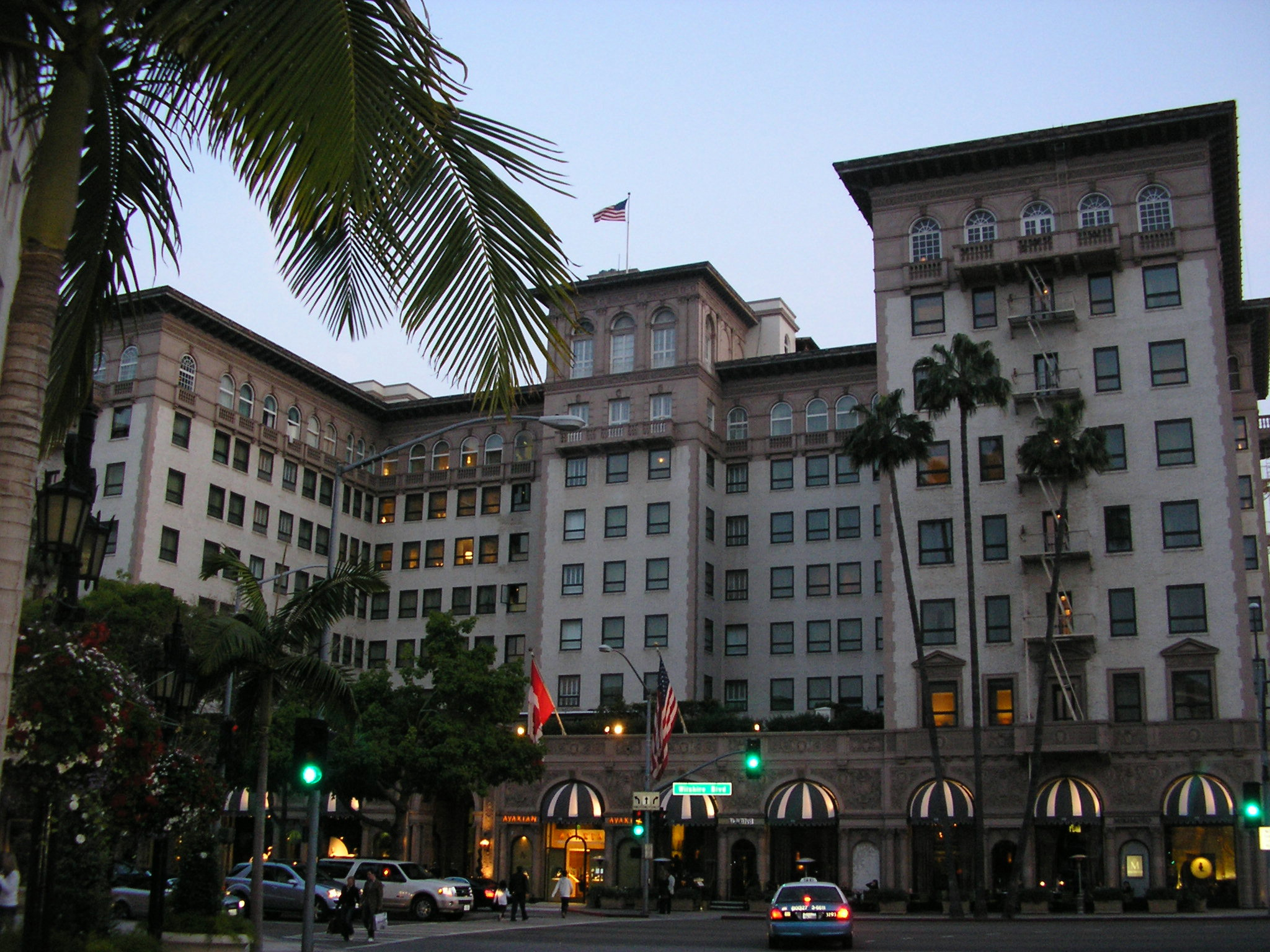
Beverly Wilshire Hotel, built in 1922 on Wilshire Boulevard

In 1928, the Beverly Wilshire Apartment Hotel (now the Beverly Wilshire Hotel) opened on Wilshire Boulevard between El Camino and Rodeo drives, part of the old Beverly Hills Speedway. That same year, oilman Edward L. Doheny finished construction of Greystone Mansion, a 55-room mansion meant as a wedding present for his son Edward L. Doheny Jr. The house is now owned by the city of Beverly Hills and is a designated historical landmark.

In the early 1930s, Santa Monica Park was renamed Beverly Gardens and was extended to span the entire two-mile (3-kilometer) length of Santa Monica Boulevard through the city. The Electric Fountain marks the corner of Santa Monica Blvd. and Wilshire Blvd. with a small sculpture at the top of a Tongva kneeling in prayer. In April 1931, the new Italian Renaissance-style Beverly Hills City Hall was opened.

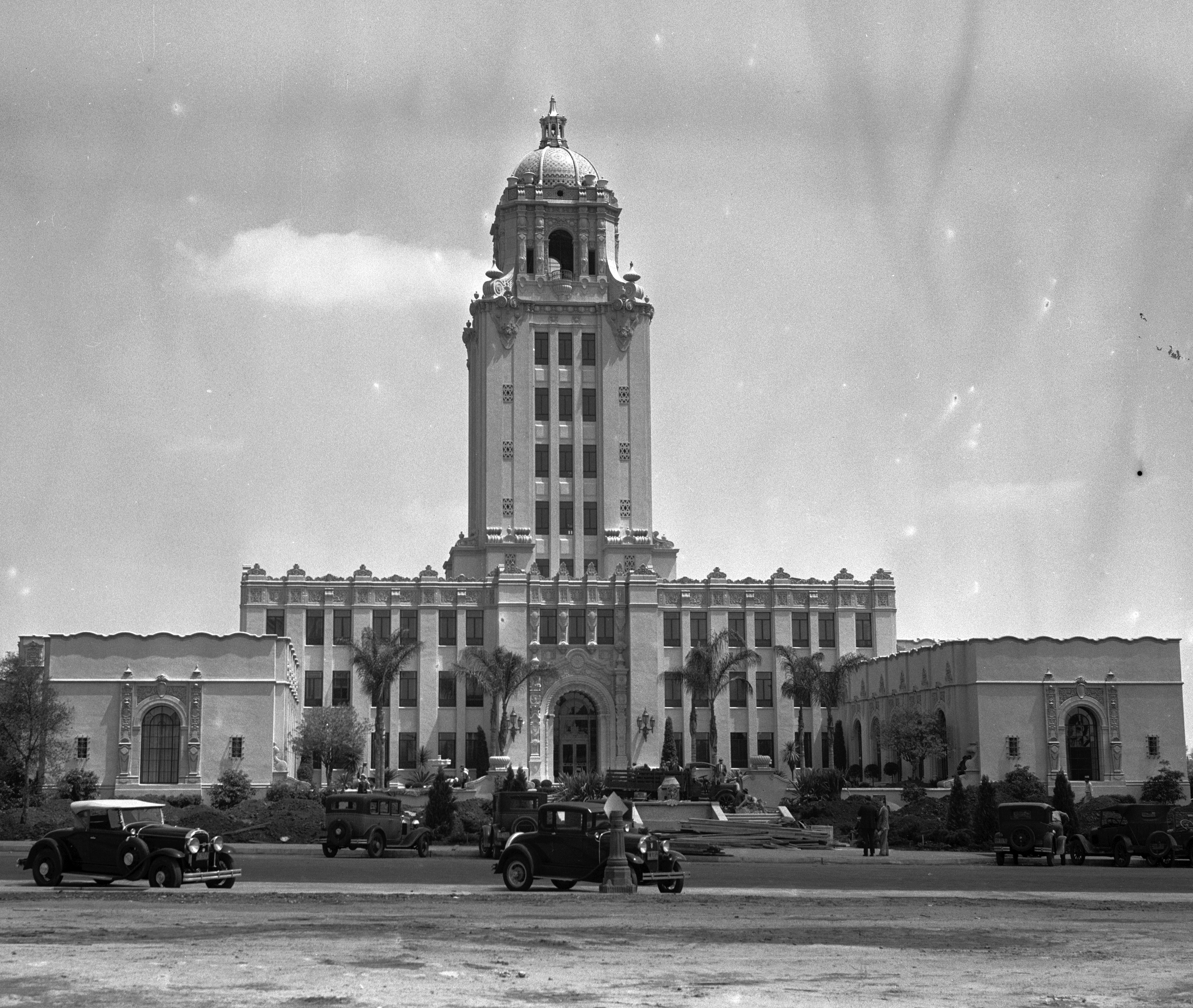
Beverly Hills City Hall, built in 1932 in a California Churrigueresque style

==== 1948: restrictive covenants found unenforceable ====
In the early 1940s, black actors and businessmen had begun to move into Beverly Hills, despite the covenants allowing only whites to live in the city. A neighborhood improvement association attempted to enforce the covenants in court. The defendants included prominent artists Hattie McDaniel, Louise Beavers, and Ethel Waters. Among the white residents supporting the lawsuit against blacks was Harold Lloyd, the silent film star. The NAACP participated in the defense, which was successful. In his decision, federal judge Thurmond Clarke said that it was time that "members of the Negro race are accorded, without reservations or evasions, the full rights guaranteed to them under the 14th amendment." The United States Supreme Court declared restrictive covenants unenforceable in 1948 in Shelley v. Kraemer. A group of Jewish residents of Beverly Hills filed an amicus brief in this case.

In 1956, Paul Trousdale (1915–1990) purchased the Doheny Ranch and developed it into Trousdale Estates, convincing the city of Beverly Hills to annex it. The neighborhood has been home to Elvis Presley, Frank Sinatra, Dean Martin, Tony Curtis, Ray Charles, and President Richard Nixon, as well as, in later years, Jennifer Aniston, David Spade, Vera Wang and John Rich.

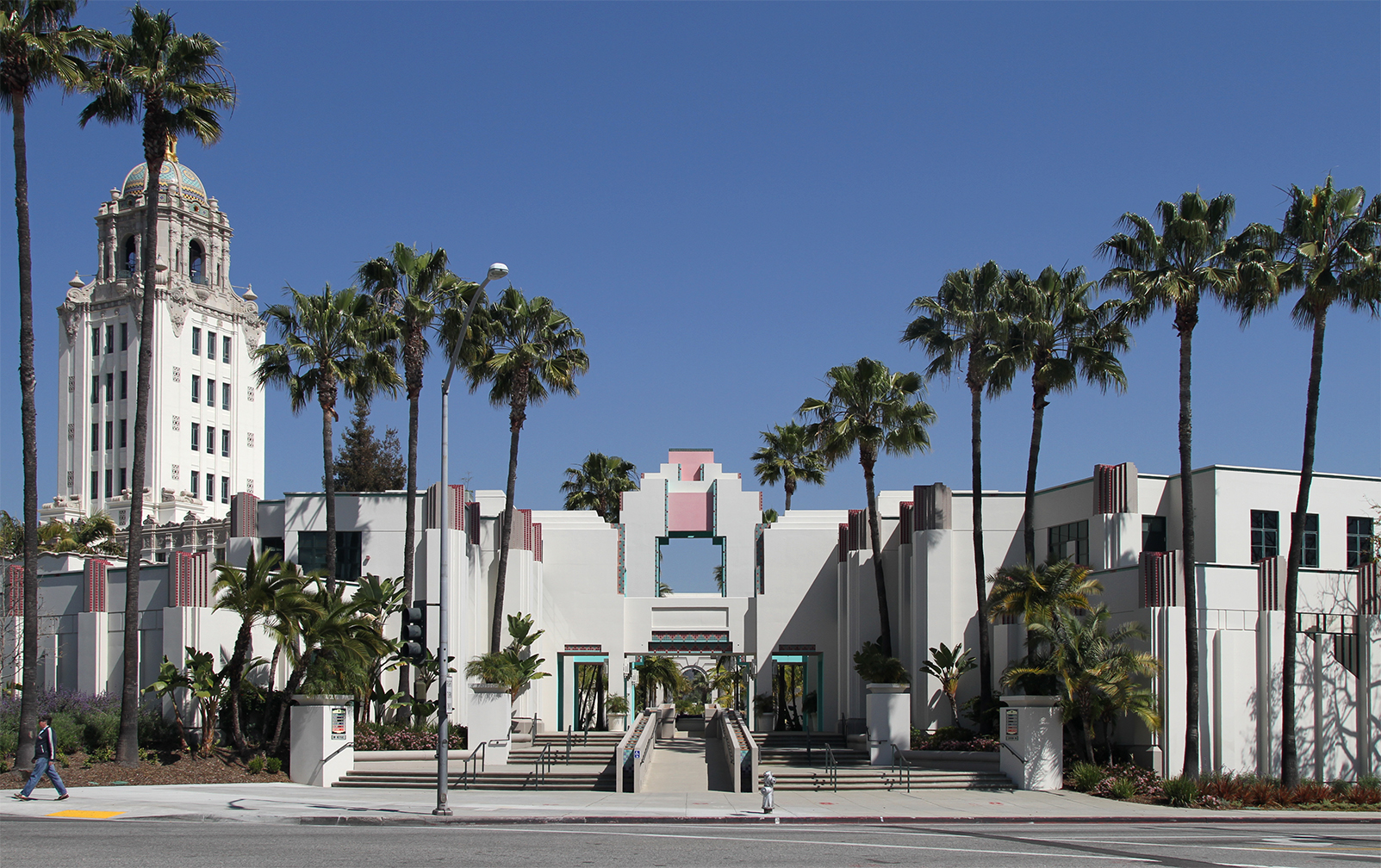
The Beverly Hills Civic Center, built 1982–90, is a mix of Spanish Revival, Art Deco, and Postmodern styles.

Following the 1979 Islamic Revolution in Iran, many Persian Jews settled in Beverly Hills.

In the late 1990s, Metro proposed to build an extension of the Metro D Line along Wilshire Boulevard into Downtown Beverly Hills, but the city opposed it. Section 2 of the D Line Extension will include a station at Wilshire Boulevard and Rodeo Drive that will open in 2026.

=== 21st century ===
In 2001, LACMTA proposed a bus rapid transit route down Santa Monica Boulevard, but this was opposed by the city and never built. This stretch of road is served by less efficient Metro Rapid buses using pre-existing roadways. By 2010, traffic in Beverly Hills and surrounding areas had deteriorated enough that the city's habitual opposition had largely turned to support for subways within the city limits. As part of the D Line Extension project, the D Line of the Los Angeles Metro Rail was intended in 2013 to be extended through Beverly Hills, adding two underground stations at Wilshire/La Cienega and Beverly Drive by the 2020s.

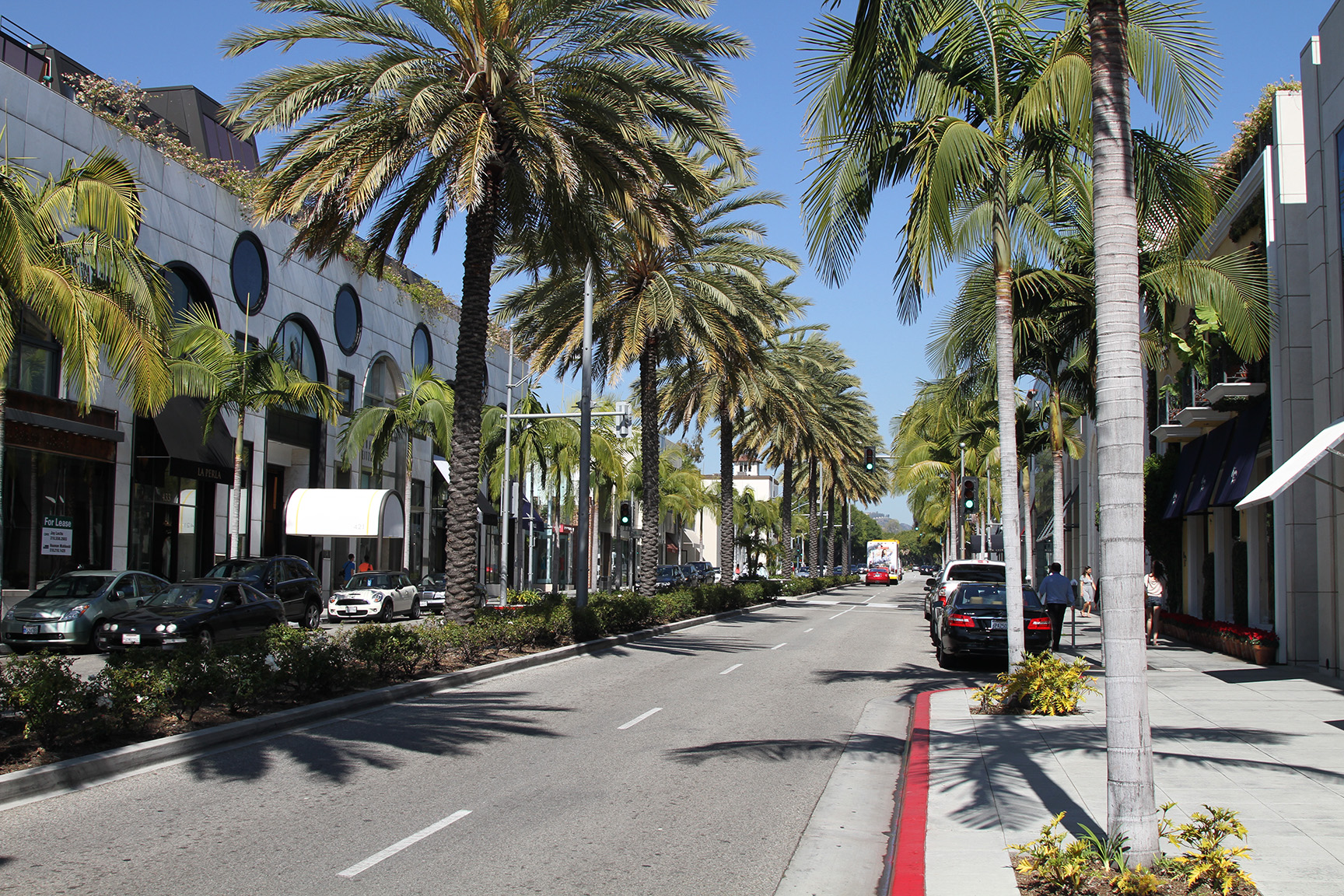
Since the 1960s, Rodeo Drive has become one of the most expensive shopping streets in the world.

The city of Beverly Hills widely opposed Proposition 8, the 2008 ballot measure which repealed legal recognition of same-sex marriages. The proposition narrowly passed statewide, but in Beverly Hills, only 34% voted in favor, and 66% voted against it.

In the midst of the 2015 drought, Beverly Hills was found to be one of the largest water consumers in California. As a result, it was asked by the state to reduce consumption by 36%, prompting many residents to replace their lawns with native plants. Meanwhile, the city government replaced the grass in front of the City Hall with Mexican sage.

In September 2015, the City of Beverly Hills signed an agreement with Israel to work together on water use as well as "cybersecurity, public health, emergency services, disaster preparedness, public safety, counterterrorism and art and culture".

In July 2016, the City of Beverly Hills received the Livability Award from the United States Conference of Mayors for its Ambassador Program, which takes care of the city's homeless population.

The Beverly Hills Community Dog Park was dedicated on September 6, 2016.

In 2024, the California Attorney General held Beverly Hills accountable for preventing reproductive health clinic from opening, failing to protect California's Constitutional Right to Abortion.

== Geography ==
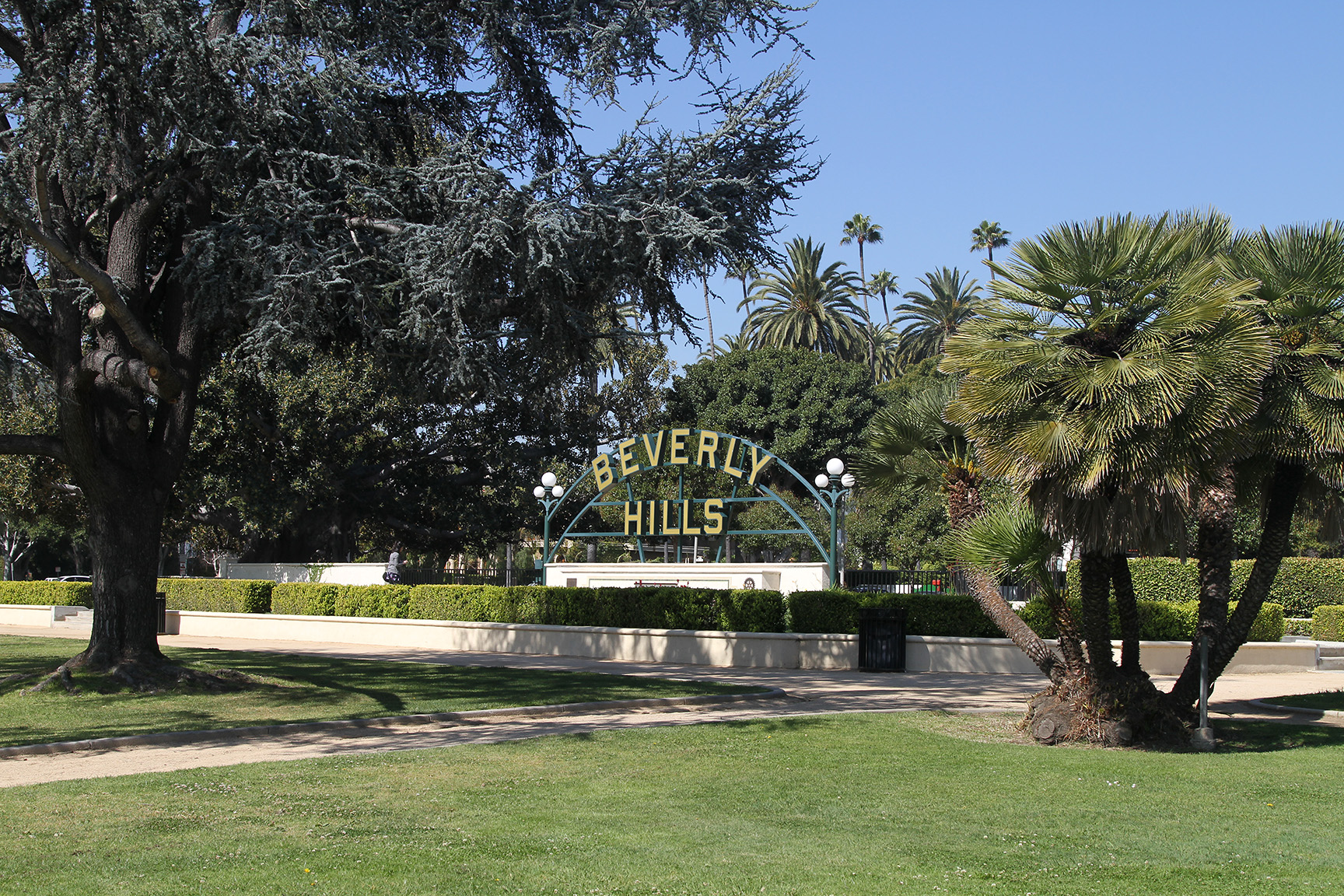
Beverly Gardens Park

Beverly Hills and the neighboring city of West Hollywood are together entirely surrounded by the city of Los Angeles. Beverly Hills is bordered on the northwest by the Los Angeles neighborhood of Bel Air and the Santa Monica Mountains, on the east by West Hollywood, the Carthay neighborhood of Los Angeles, and the Fairfax District of Los Angeles, and on the south by the Beverlywood neighborhood of Los Angeles. The area's "Platinum Triangle" is formed by the city of Beverly Hills and the Los Angeles neighborhoods of Bel Air and Holmby Hills.

The ZIP codes for Beverly Hills are 90209 (P.O. boxes only), 90210, 90211, 90212, and 90213 (P.O. boxes only).

=== Areas ===
==== The Flats ====
Most residents live in the "flats" of Beverly Hills, which is a relatively flat area that slopes away from the hills, and includes all of Beverly Hills south of Sunset Boulevard and north of Santa Monica Boulevard. This area includes Wallis Annenberg Center for the Performing Arts.

==== Trousdale Estates ====
Trousdale Estates is a 410-acre neighborhood of large, luxurious homes in Beverly Hills. It was primarily developed in the 1950s and early 1960s by Paul Trousdale, who petitioned the city to incorporate the land into Beverly Hills soon after purchasing it from the Doheny family. Greystone Mansion, which is listed on the National Register of Historic Places, is in Trousdale Estates. The average sale price of homes in Trousdale is over $10 million.

==== Downtown Beverly Hills ====
In a triangle surrounded by Santa Monica Boulevard, Wilshire Boulevard and Crescent Drive is Downtown Beverly Hills, also known as the Golden Triangle, a retail and dining hub attracting locals, and in some sections attracting visitors from across the region and around the world.

- Linden, Roxbury, Bedford and Camden drives, short streets catering to residents' needs, lined with medical offices, bank branches, delicatessens, etc.
- Rodeo Drive, known for high-end boutiques.
- Beverly Drive, lined with upscale chain retailers commonly found in malls. Some restaurants line Beverly Drive as well.
- Cañon and Crescent drives, attracting local and regional shoppers and diners to restaurants such as Spago as well as local favorites, particularly along Cañon.
- Wilshire Boulevard is home to the two department stores remaining in the city: Saks Fifth Avenue, and Neiman Marcus.

South Beverly Drive, i.e. south of Wilshire Boulevard, is another dining and shopping hub.

Houses south of Wilshire Boulevard have more urban square and rectangular lots, in general smaller than those to the north. There are also more apartment buildings south of Wilshire Boulevard than anywhere else in Beverly Hills.

==== West Gateway ====
The city's West Gateway on Wilshire Blvd. borders the Los Angeles Country Club. The gateway features a hospitality complex consisting of The Beverly Hilton, Waldorf Astoria Beverly Hills, and the currently under-construction One Beverly Hills. This development will include the tallest tower in Beverly Hills. Across from this complex is one of the city's elementary schools, El Rodeo.

==== South East ====
The South East is anchored by La Cienega Park, a large park that includes city tennis court complex, baseball field, and soccer fields. The region includes the historic Saban Theater as well as the "Restaurant Row" corridor of La Cienega, including Lawry's, Stinking Rose, and Matsuhisa. It also includes a corridor of medical buildings and office tower, including the Flynt Building, the 99 La Cienega Medical building, and the 240 Medical building. South East Beverly Hills is the site of one of the two Metro D Line stations in the city, the Wilshire/La Cienega station, which opened on May 8, 2026. The area is just south of the Beverly Center and Cedars-Sinai.

==== Beverly Hills adjacent ====
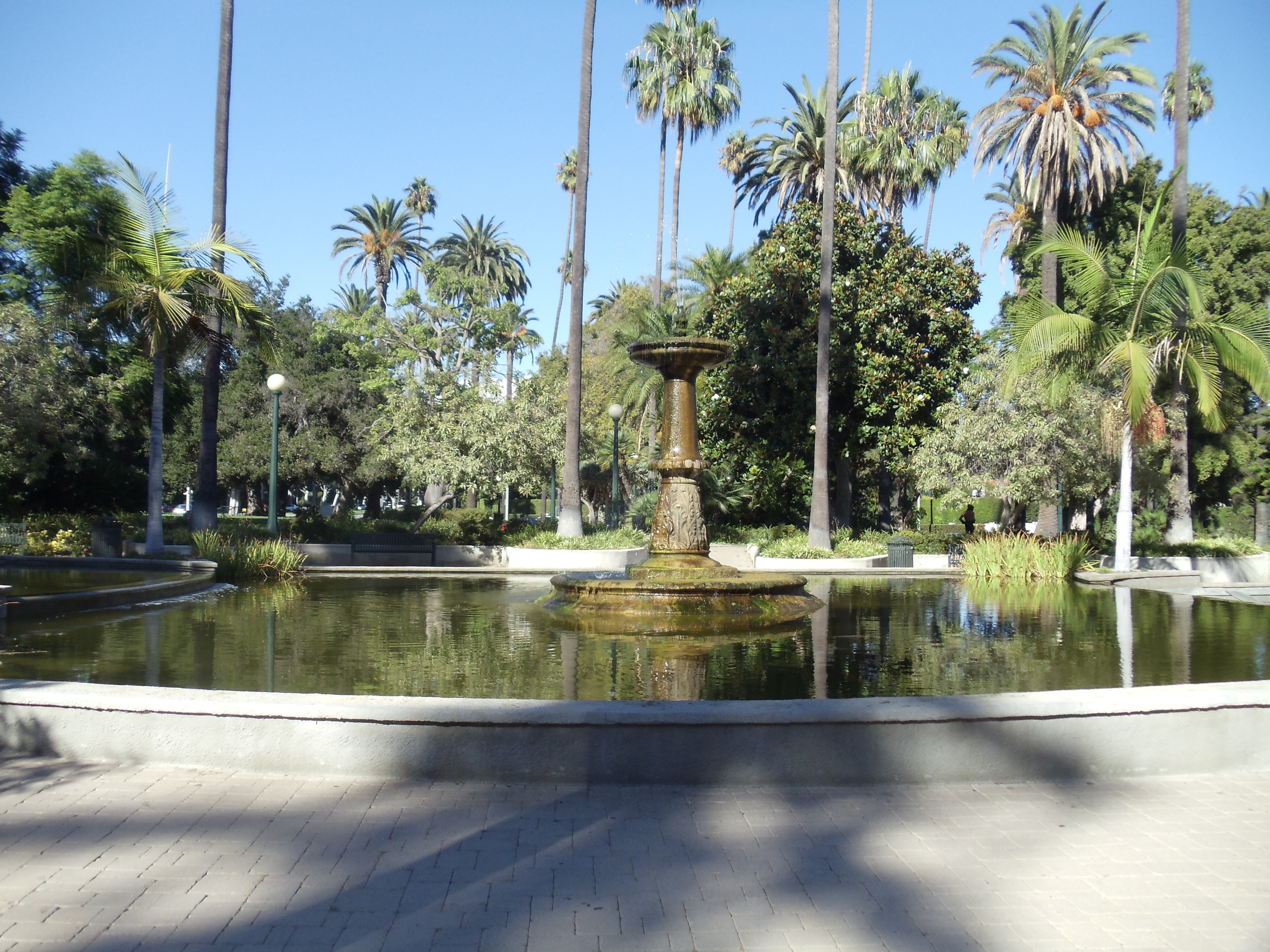
Will Rogers Memorial Park

Beverly Hills Post Office (BHPO) is the name given to a section directly north of the Beverly Hills city limits that lies within the 90210 ZIP code, assigned to the Beverly Hills Post Office, but is part of the City of Los Angeles.

Along with the Los Angeles communities of Bel-Air and Brentwood, Beverly Hills is one of the "Three Bs", a wealthy area in the Los Angeles Westside.

Beverly Hills has a warm Mediterranean and receives an average 15 inches (380 mm) of rain per year. Summers are marked by warm to hot temperatures with very little wind, while winters are mild to moderate, with occasional rain alternating with periods of Santa Ana winds. Measurable snowfall has been recorded only in 1882, 1922, 1932, 1949 and 1958.

August is typically the warmest month, with an average temperature of 78.4°F, while January is the coolest, with an average minimum temperature of 49.6°F. Rainfall is concentrated in the winter months, with approximately 79% of the annual precipitation occurring between December and March. Summers are particularly dry, with very little rainfall from June through September.

degrees

== Demographics ==
Historical population
Census	Pop.	Note	%±
1920	674		—
1930	17,429		2,485.9%
1940	26,823		53.9%
1950	29,032		8.2%
1960	30,817		6.1%
1970	33,416		8.4%
1980	32,367		−3.1%
1990	31,971		−1.2%
2000	33,784		5.7%
2010	34,109		1.0%
2020	32,701		−4.1%
U.S. Decennial Census; 1860–1870 1880–1890; 1900 1910 1920; 1930 1940 1950; 1960 1970 1980; 1990 2000 2010; 2020

Beverly Hills first appeared as a city in the 1920 U.S. census as part of the now defunct Cahuenga Township.

=== Racial and ethnic composition ===
Beverly Hills city, California – Racial and ethnic composition Note: the US Census treats Hispanic/Latino as an ethnic category. This table excludes Latinos from the racial categories and assigns them to a separate category. Hispanics/Latinos may be of any race.
Race / Ethnicity (NH = Non-Hispanic)	Pop 2000	Pop 2010	Pop 2020	% 2000	% 2010	% 2020
White alone (NH)	27,717	26,794	24,894	82.04%	78.55%	76.13%
Black or African American alone (NH)	584	725	662	1.73%	2.13%	2.02%
Native American or Alaska Native alone (NH)	32	29	13	0.09%	0.09%	0.04%
Asian alone (NH)	2,366	3,009	2,865	7.00%	8.82%	8.76%
Native Hawaiian or Pacific Islander alone (NH)	8	10	11	0.02%	0.03%	0.03%
Other race alone (NH)	105	87	261	0.31%	0.26%	0.80%
Mixed race or Multiracial (NH)	1,407	1,514	1,777	4.16%	4.44%	5.43%
Hispanic or Latino (any race)	1,565	1,941	2,218	4.63%	5.69%	6.78%
Total	33,784	34,109	32,701	100.00%	100.00%	100.00%

Race (NH = Non-Hispanic)	% 1990	% 1980	Pop 1990	Pop 1980
White alone (NH)	87.4%	91%	27,937	29,461
Black alone (NH)	1.7%	1.3%	528	406
American Indian alone (NH)	0.1%	0.1%	42	47
Asian or Pacific Islander alone (NH)	5.3%	2.4%	1,708	784
Other race alone (NH)	0.1%	0.5%	31	178
Hispanic/Latino (any race)	5.4%	4.6%	1,725	1,491

As of 2020, 25.7% of the population reported Middle Eastern or North African ancestry. The most reported ancestries were:

- Iranian (20.1%)
- English (6.5%)
- German (5.9%)
- Russian (5%)
- Irish (4.7%)
- Italian (3.7%)
- Korean (2.9%)
- Polish (2.9%)
- Mexican (2.9%)
- French (2.8%)

=== 2020 census ===
The Academy of Motion Picture Arts and Sciences' Fairbanks Center for Motion Picture Study, built in 1928 in a Spanish Colonial Revival style

As of the 2020 census, Beverly Hills had a population of 32,701 and a population density of 5,729.0 inhabitants per square mile (2,212.0/km^{2}). The census reported that 99.7% of residents lived in households, 0.2% lived in non-institutionalized group quarters, 0.2% were institutionalized, and 100.0% lived in urban areas while 0.0% lived in rural areas.

Racial composition as of the 2020 census
Race	Number	Percent
White	25,460	77.9%
Black or African American	680	2.1%
American Indian and Alaska Native	46	0.1%
Asian	2,886	8.8%
Native Hawaiian and Other Pacific Islander	13	0.0%
Some other race	759	2.3%
Two or more races	2,857	8.7%
Hispanic or Latino (of any race)	2,218	6.8%

The age distribution was 16.9% under the age of 18, 8.0% aged 18 to 24, 24.5% aged 25 to 44, 27.1% aged 45 to 64, and 23.5% who were 65 years of age or older. The median age was 45.5 years. For every 100 females, there were 85.0 males, and for every 100 females age 18 and over there were 81.5 males.

There were 14,564 households, of which 22.2% had children under the age of 18 living in them. Of all households, 41.5% were married-couple households, 4.4% were cohabiting couple households, 35.7% were households with a female householder and no partner present, and 18.4% were households with a male householder and no partner present. About 37.2% of households were made up of individuals and 14.4% had someone living alone who was 65 years of age or older. The average household size was 2.24. There were 8,046 families (55.2% of all households).

There were 16,242 housing units at an average density of 2,845.5 units per square mile (1,098.7 units/km^{2}), of which 14,564 (89.7%) were occupied. Of these, 42.0% were owner-occupied, and 58.0% were occupied by renters; 10.3% of housing units were vacant, with a homeowner vacancy rate of 1.9% and a rental vacancy rate of 8.0%.

During 2019–2023, Beverly Hills had a median household income of $127,979, with 9.0% of the population living below the federal poverty line.

=== 2010 census ===
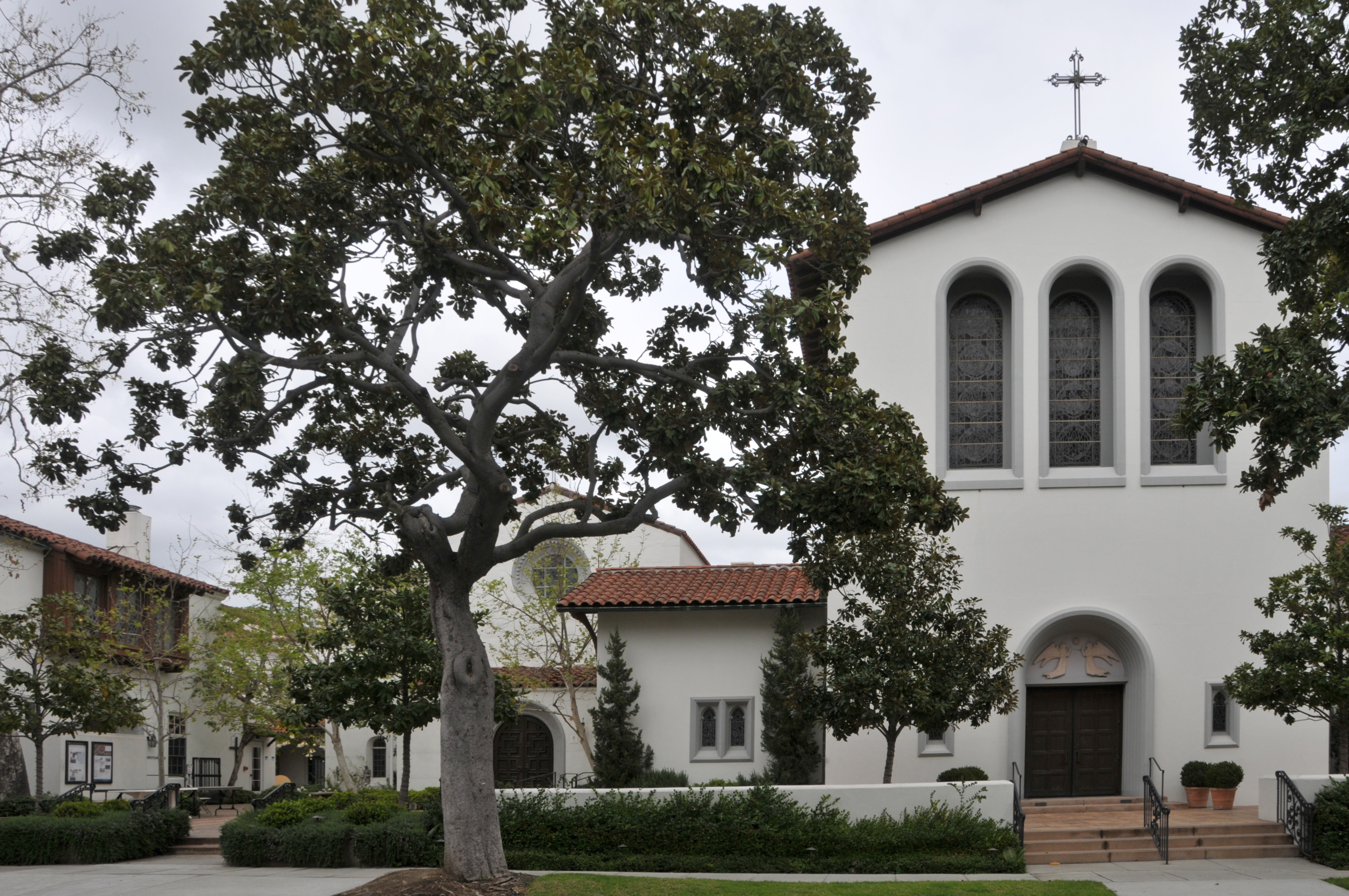
All Saints' Episcopal Church

The 2010 United States census reported that Beverly Hills had a population of 34,109. The population density was 5,973.1 inhabitants per square mile (2,306.2/km^{2}). The racial makeup of Beverly Hills was 28,112 (82.4%) White (78.6% Non-Hispanic White), 746 (2.2%) African American, 48 (0.1%) Native American, 3,032 (8.9%) Asian, 12 (0.0%) Pacific Islander, 485 (1.4%) from other races, and 1,674 (4.9%) from two or more races. There were 1,941 residents of Hispanic or Latino ancestry, of any race (5.7%).

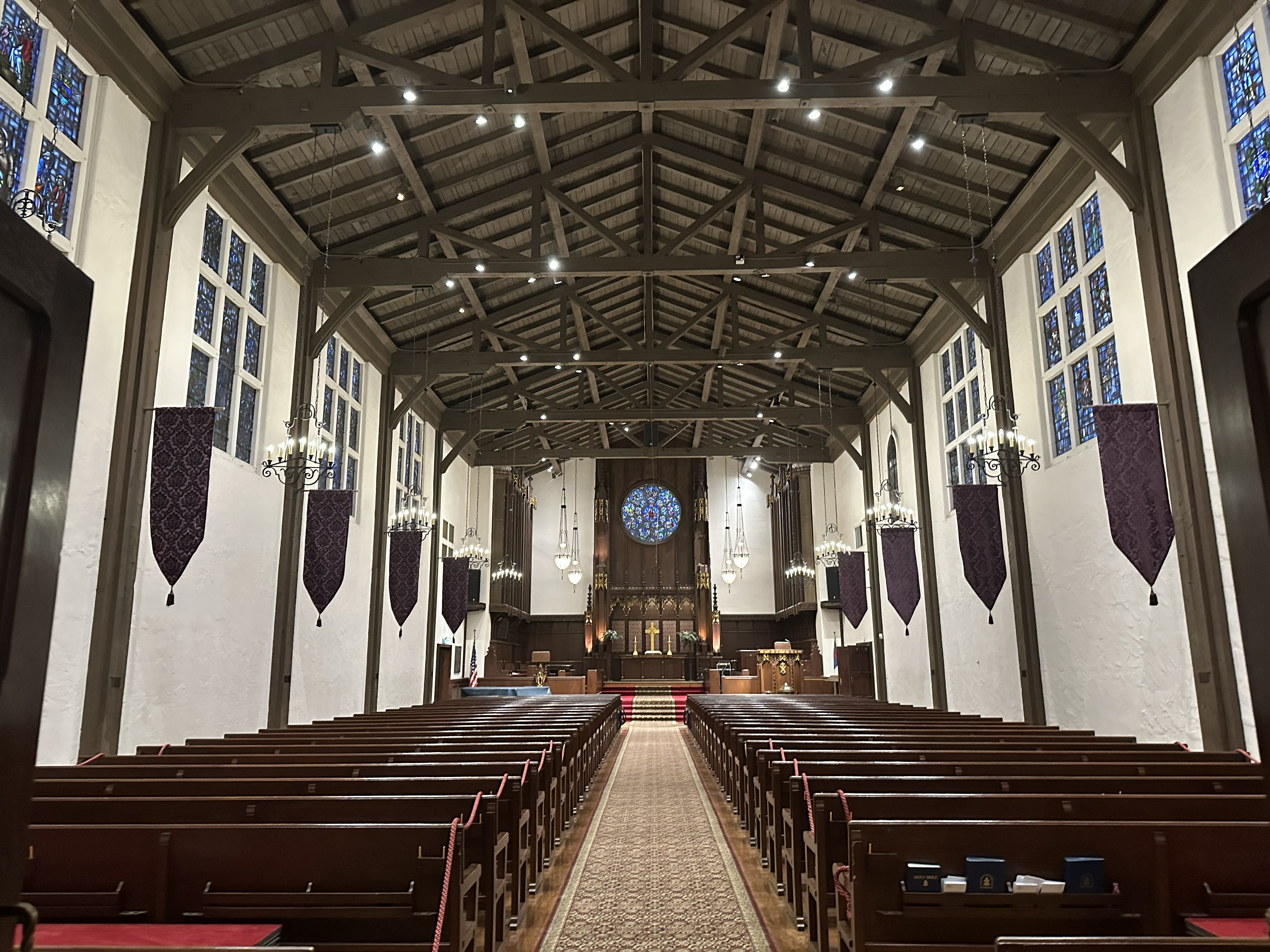
Beverly Hills Presbyterian Church, Los Angeles

The Census reported that 33,988 people (99.6% of the population) lived in households, 121 (0.4%) lived in non-institutionalized group quarters, and 0 (0%) were institutionalized.

There were 14,869 households, out of which 3,759 (25.3%) had children under the age of 18 living in them, 6,613 (44.5%) were opposite-sex married couples living together, 1,354 (9.1%) had a female householder with no husband present, 494 (3.3%) had a male householder with no wife present. There were 460 (3.1%) unmarried opposite-sex partnerships, and 131 (0.9%) same-sex married couples or partnerships. 5,400 households (36.3%) were made up of individuals, and 1,834 (12.3%) had someone living alone who was 65 years of age or older. The average household size was 2.29. There were 8,461 families (56.9% of all households); the average family size was 3.05.

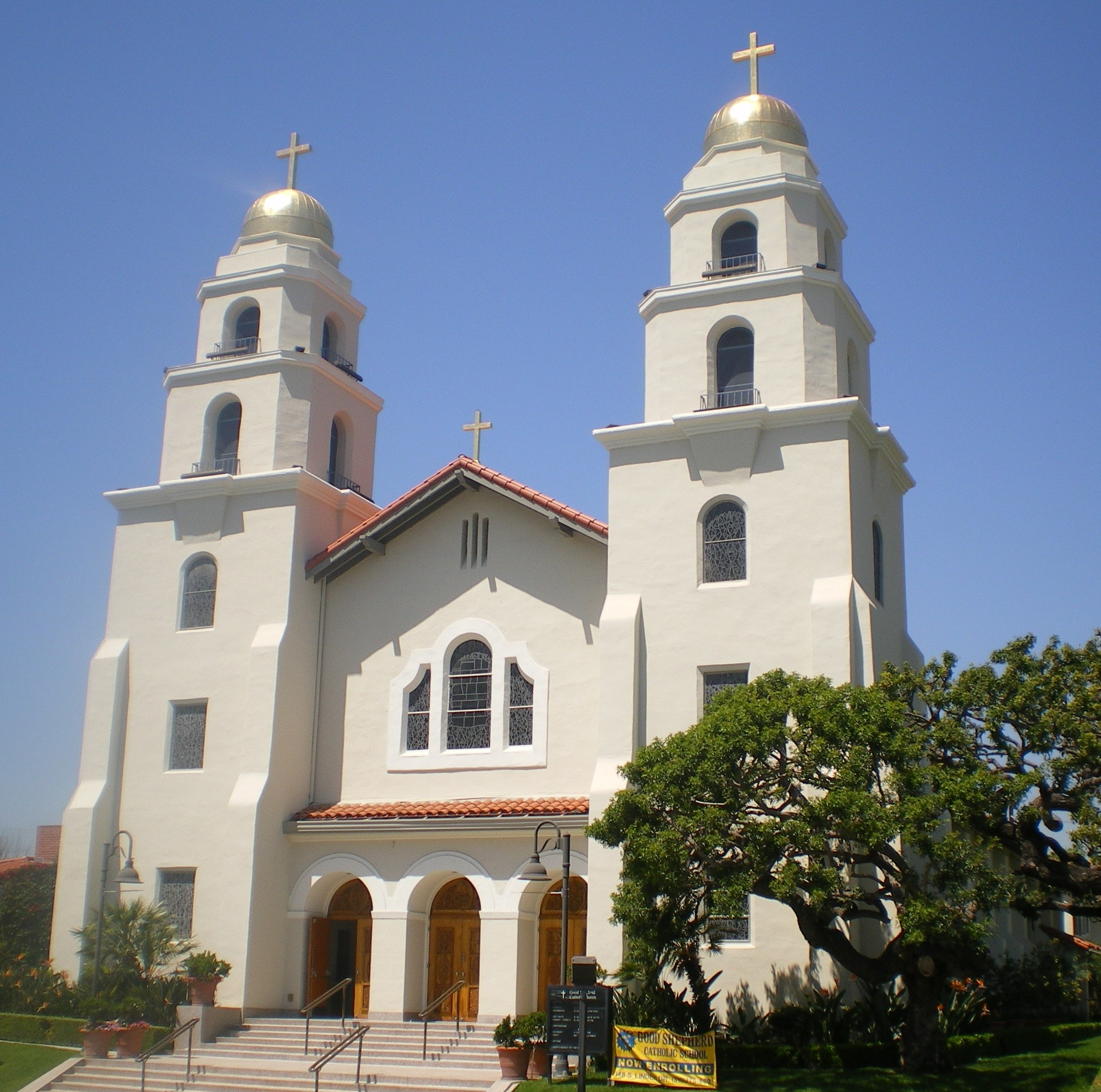
Church of the Good Shepherd

There were 6,623 residents (19.4%) under the age of 18, 2,526 (7.4%) aged 18 to 24, 8,540 (25.0%) aged 25 to 44, 9,904 (29.0%) aged 45 to 64, and 6,516 (19.1%) who were 65 years of age or older. The median age was 43.6 years. For every 100 females, there were 84.3 males. For every 100 females age 18 and over, there were 80.3 males.

There were 16,394 housing units at an average density of 2,870.9 units per square mile (1,108.5 units/km^{2}), of which 6,561 (44.1%) were owner-occupied, and 8,308 (55.9%) were occupied by renters. The homeowner vacancy rate was 2.2%; the rental vacancy rate was 8.0%. 17,740 people (52.0% of the population) lived in owner-occupied housing units and 16,248 people (47.6%) lived in rental housing units.

During 2009–2013, Beverly Hills had a median household income of $86,141, with 8.8% of the population living below the federal poverty line.

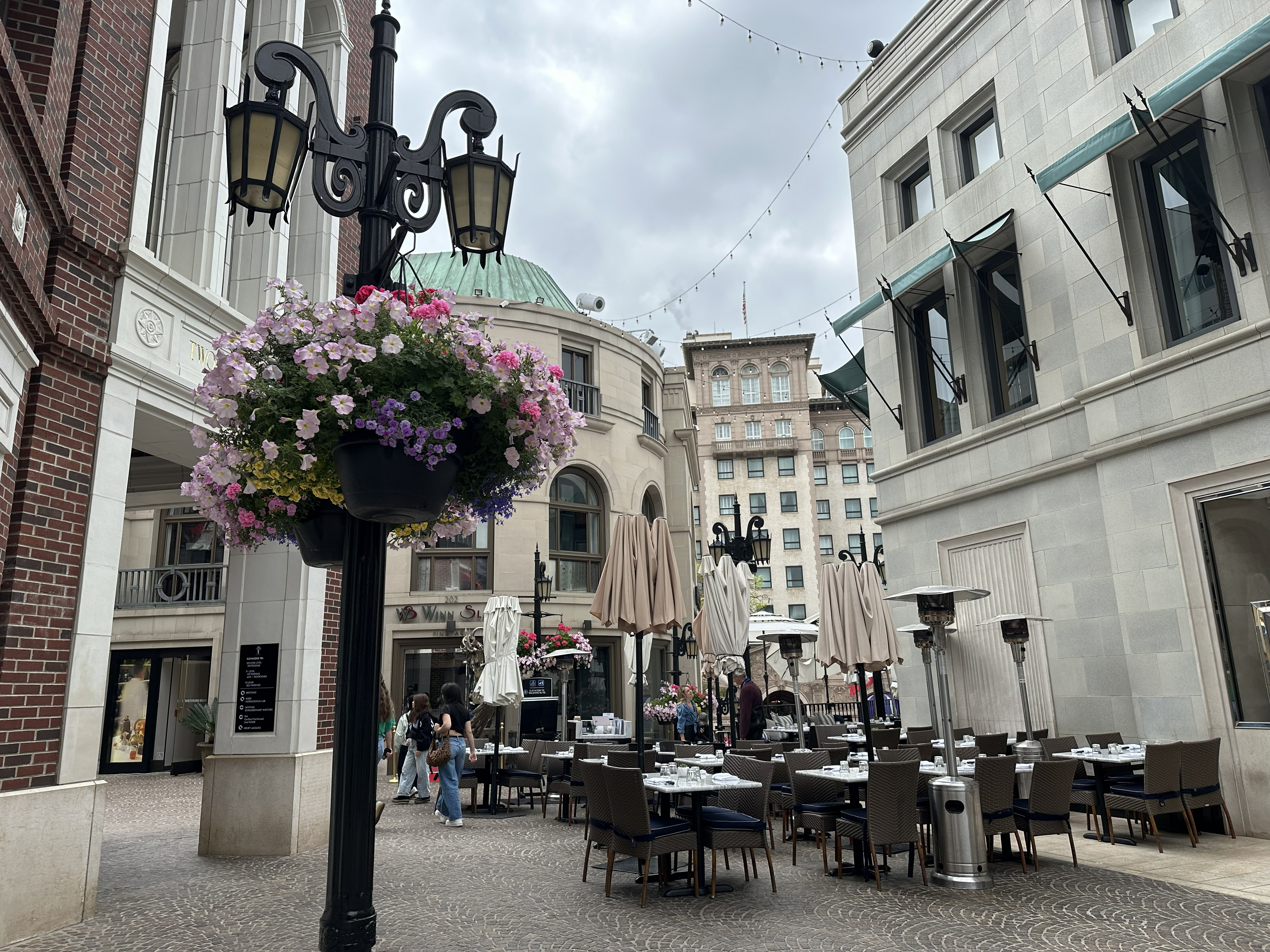

== Economy ==
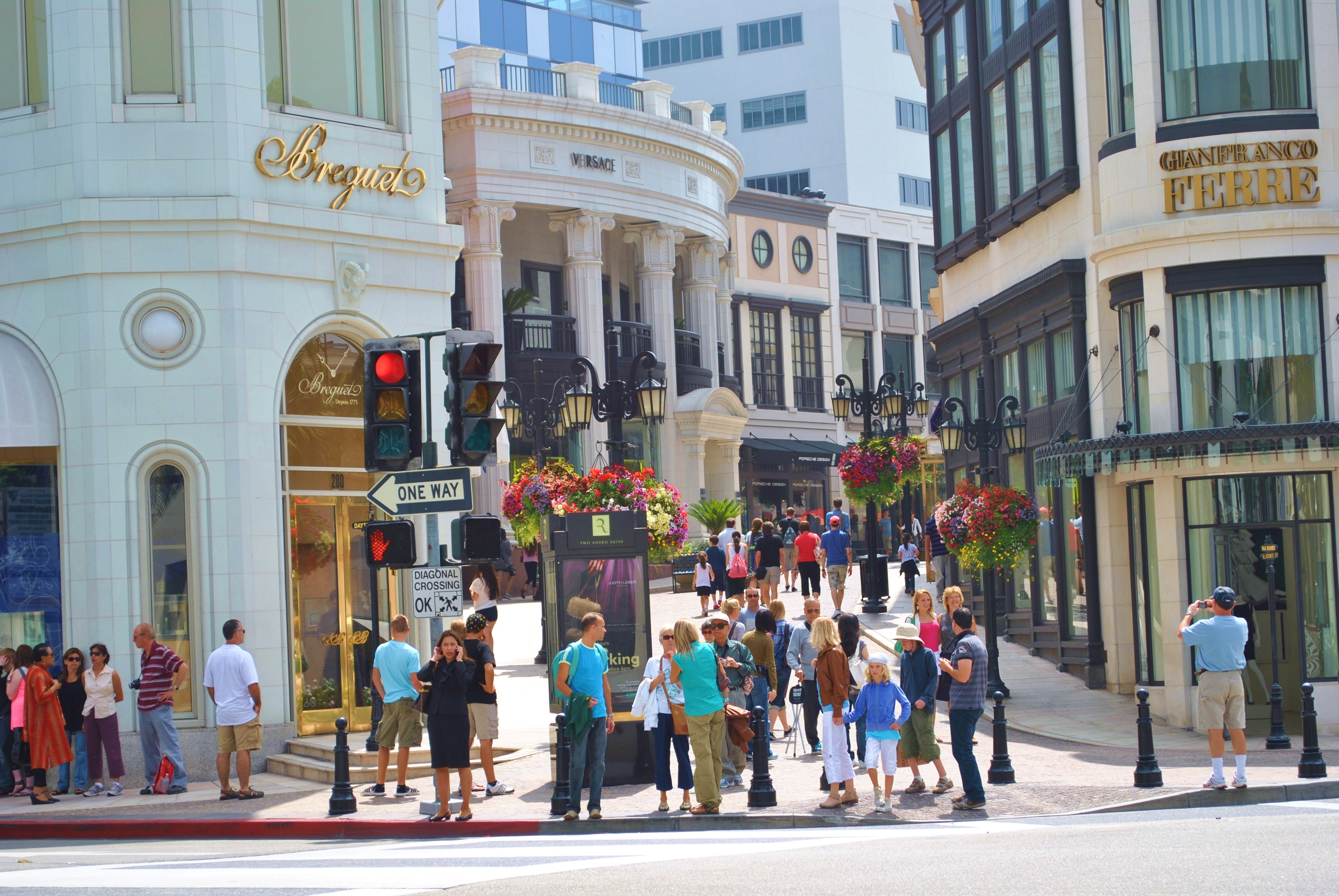
Rodeo Drive is one of the most expensive streets in the world.

Beverly Hills is home to one Fortune 500 company, Live Nation Entertainment. Since August 22, 2011, the headquarters of Metro-Goldwyn-Mayer have been located in Beverly Hills after a significant film history established close by on the main original studio lots in Culver City. The talent agencies William Morris Endeavor, Paradigm Talent Agency, The Gersh Agency, United Talent Agency, and Agency for the Performing Arts are based in Beverly Hills.

Hilton Hotels Corporation formerly had its corporate headquarters in Beverly Hills. The original headquarters of GeoCities (at first Beverly Hills Internet) was at 9401 Wilshire Boulevard in Beverly Hills.

The large Beverly Hills Oil Field has four urban drilling islands, which drill diagonally into the earth underneath the city. One drilling island occasioned a 2003 lawsuit representing former attendees of Beverly Hills High School, approximately 280 of whom suffered from cancers allegedly tied to the drilling operations. The oil site on the high school grounds is in the process of being shut down.

=== Top employers in 2015 ===
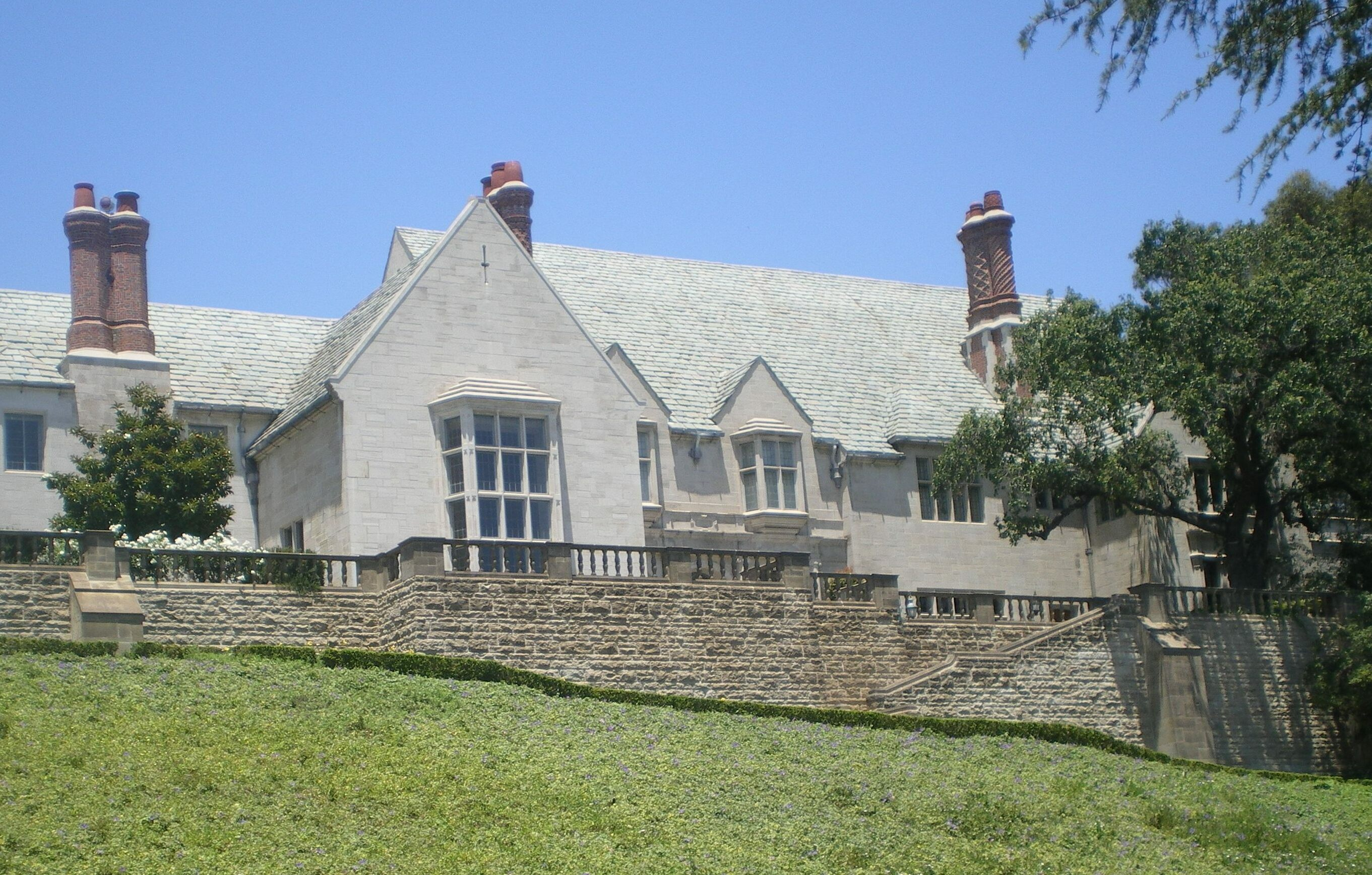
Greystone Mansion is often used as locations for film and television shows.

According to the city's 2015 Comprehensive Annual Financial Report, the top employers in the city were:

#	Employer	# of Employees
1	City of Beverly Hills	1,042
2	Beverly Hills Unified School District	642
3	Beverly Wilshire Hotel	620
4	The Beverly Hilton	599
5	The Beverly Hills Hotel	500
6	William Morris Agency	500
7	Saks Fifth Avenue	460
8	Neiman Marcus Group	430
9	Creative Artists Agency	425
10	The Peninsula Beverly Hills	400

== Government ==
=== Municipal government ===
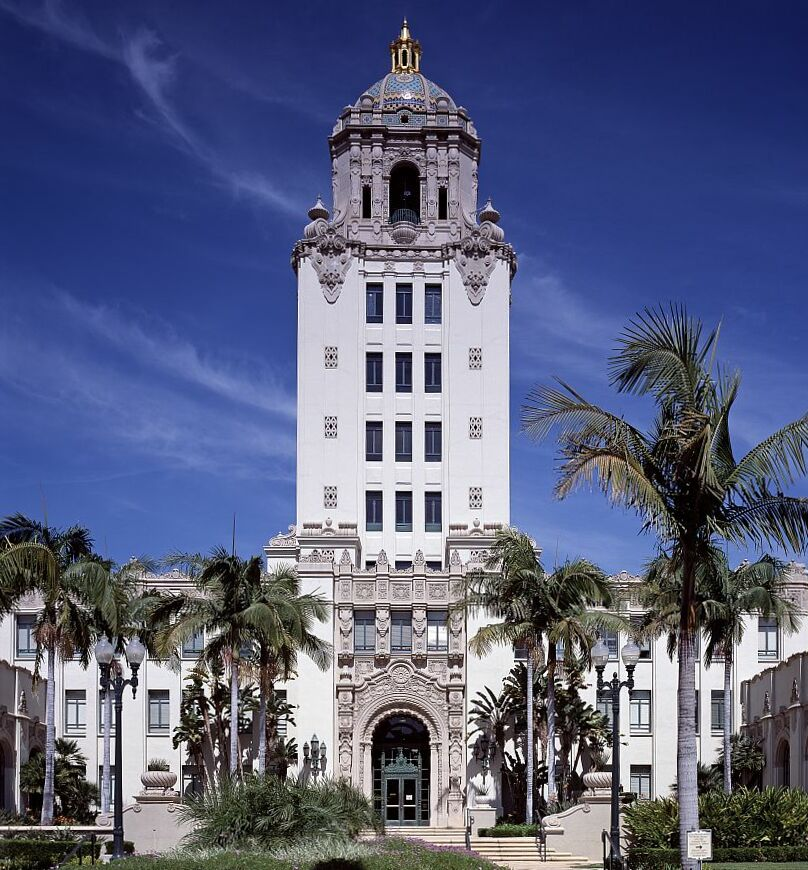
Beverly Hills City Hall, built in 1931 in a California Churrigueresque style

Beverly Hills is a general law city governed by a five-member city council, including the mayor and vice mayor. The city council hires a city manager to carry out policies and serve as executive officer. Until 2017, every odd-numbered year, either two or three members were elected for four-year terms. However, in 2017, the council changed its cycle to conform with statewide elections; the first such election was held in March 2020. Each April, the city council meets and chooses one of its members as mayor and one as vice-mayor. As of April 2025, Sharona R. Nazarian is mayor, John Mirisch is vice mayor, and Lester Friedman, Craig Corman, and Mary Wells are councilmembers. Ryan Golich serves as city manager. The Director of Community Services is Jamie Bumia.

=== County, state and federal representation ===
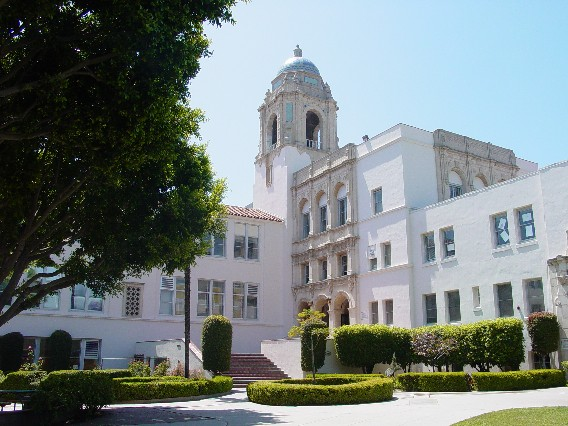
BHUSD's El Rodeo School

On the Los Angeles County Board of Supervisors, Beverly Hills is in the Third District, represented as of 2025 by Lindsey Horvath.

In the upper house of the California State Legislature, Beverly Hills is in the 24th senatorial district, represented by Democrat Ben Allen. In the lower house, it is in the 51st Assembly district, represented by Democrat Rick Zbur.

In the United States House of Representatives, Beverly Hills is in California's 36th congressional district, represented by Democrat Ted Lieu.

=== New and existing laws ===
On January 1, 2022, Beverly Hills became the first city in America to ban the sale of all tobacco products. Smoking lounges and hotels are exempt from the new law. The city council enacted the law in June 2021. Flavored tobacco was already banned.

=== Politics ===
Beverly Hills city vote by party in presidential elections.
Year	Democratic	Republican	Third Parties
2024	45.43% 8,123	50.06% 8,968	1.9% 342
2020	55.07% 10,453	43.85% 8,325	1.06% 203
2016	63.81% 9,743	32.63% 4,982	3.55% 543
2012	54.27% 8,263	43.85% 6,676	1.86% 284
2008	59.54% 10,331	39.2% 6,801	1.25% 217
2004	62% 13,691	37.04% 8,168	0.86% 190
2000	76.51% 8,399	20.47% 2,247	3% 331
1996	68.33% 7,188	24.69% 2,598	6.96% 733
1992	65.69% 8,810	20.8% 2,790	13.5% 1,811
1988	60.1% 9,702	39.3% 6,345	0.5% 95
1984	52.71% 7,343	46.48% 6,475	0.7% 111
1980	39.65% 6,111	47.65% 7,344	12.69% 1,957
1976	52.05% 8,974	46.95% 8,094	0.9% 171
1972	49.40% 9,199	49.07% 9,135	1.5% 282
1968	61.5% 11,138	36.9% 6,693	1.4% 267
1964	64.9% 11,832	35% 6,399	

In the 2024 Los Angeles County District Attorney election, a significant majority of Beverly Hills voters, 73.51% (13,126 votes), voted for Nathan Hochman, whereas only 17.17% (3,077 votes) backed George Gascón.

In the 2024 Election for California's 36th congressional district, 44.67% (7,978 voters) of Beverly Hills backed Melissa Toomim, whereas 43.71% (7,806 voters) of the city voted for the incumbent, Ted Lieu.

== Education ==
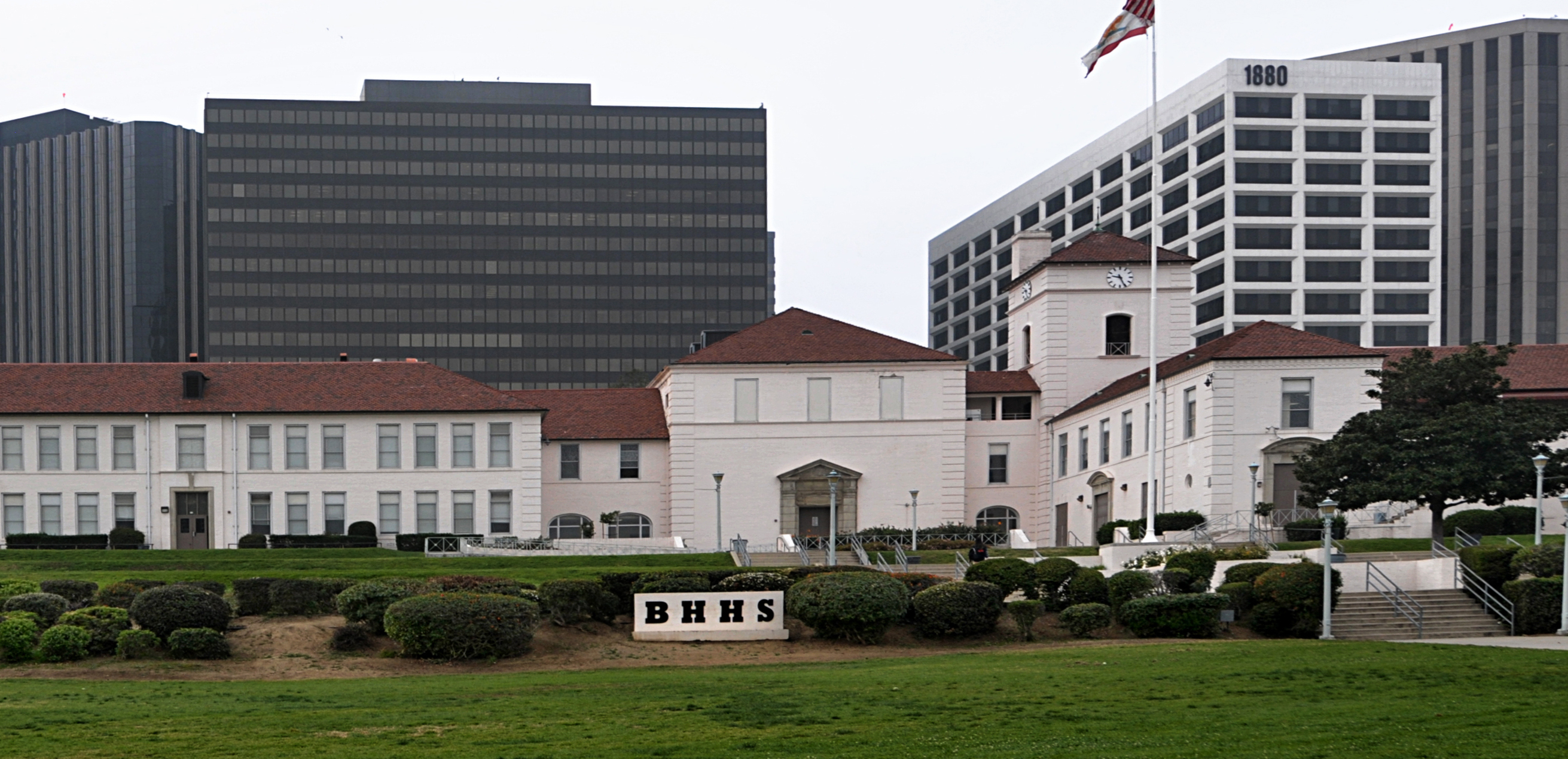
Beverly Hills High School

Beverly Hills is served by Beverly Hills Unified School District, which includes two kindergarten-through-fifth-grade schools (El Rodeo and Horace Mann), one middle school (Beverly Vista) and Beverly Hills High School. One alternative school, Moreno High School, shares its campus with the aforementioned Beverly Hills High School.

Beverly Hills also has several private schools. Good Shepherd School, a PreK-8 school, is a part of the Roman Catholic Archdiocese of Los Angeles. Other private schools include Harkham Hillel Hebrew Academy.

== Infrastructure ==
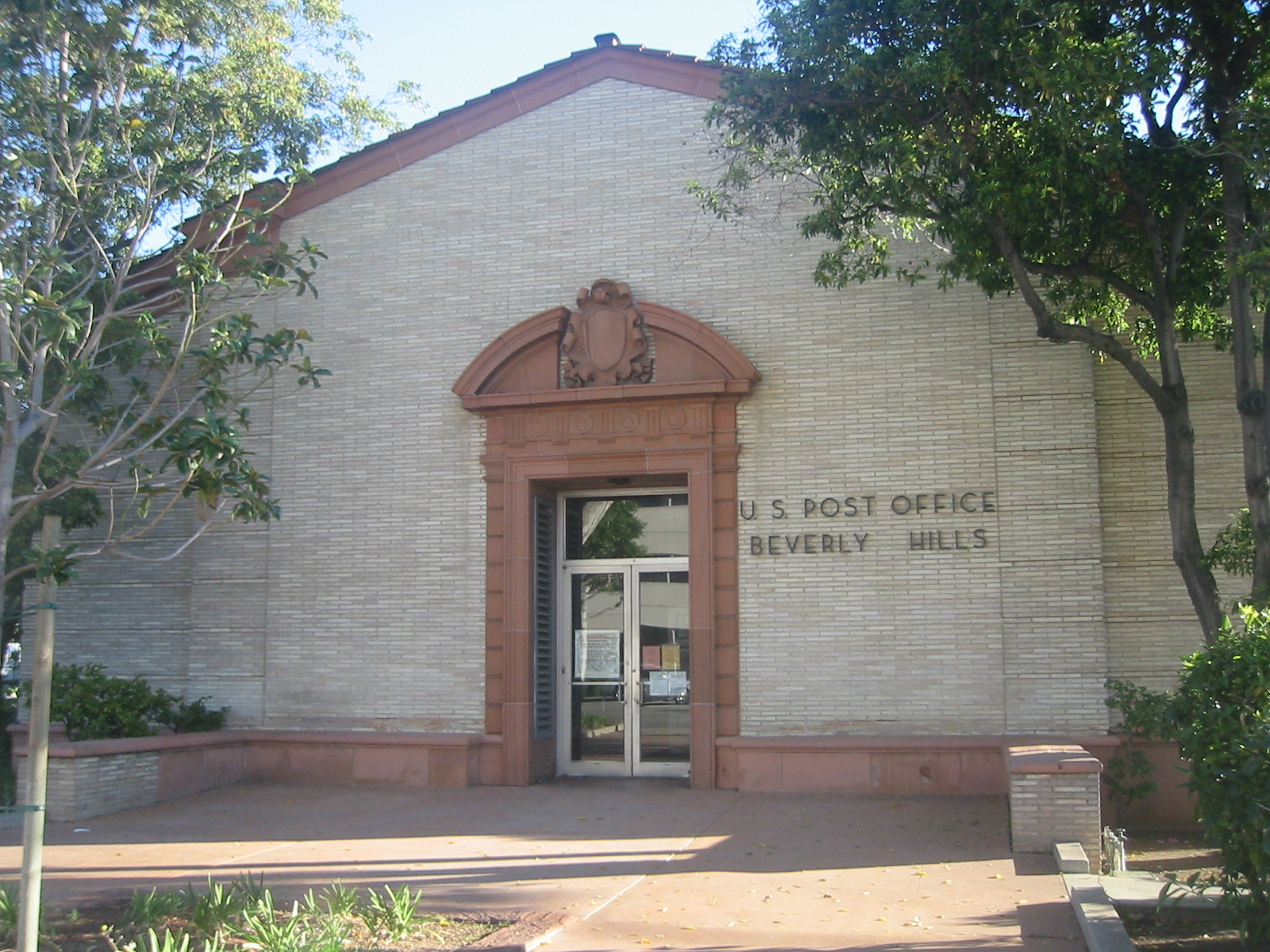
Former Beverly Hills Post Office

The Beverly Hills Police Department and the Beverly Hills Fire Department serve as emergency response agencies for the city.

The Los Angeles County Department of Health Services SPA 5 West Area Health Office serves Beverly Hills. The department operates the Simms/Mann Health and Wellness Center in Santa Monica, serving Beverly Hills.

The United States Postal Service operates the Beverly Hills Post Office at 325 North Maple Drive, the Crescent Post Office at 323 North Crescent Drive, the Beverly Post Office at 312 South Beverly Drive, and the Eastgate Post Office at 8383 Wilshire Boulevard. The former Beverly Hills Post Office was listed on the National Register of Historic Places on January 11, 1985.

=== Autonomous vehicles ===
In April 2016, the Beverly Hills City Council passed a resolution to create autonomous vehicles for public transportation within the next decade. Mayor John Mirisch said this was one of his top priorities during his tenure as mayor. "This is a game-changer for Beverly Hills and, we hope, for the region," said Mirisch in the press release. "Beverly Hills is the perfect community to take the lead to make this technology a reality. It is now both feasible and safe for autonomous cars to be on the road."

=== Subway ===
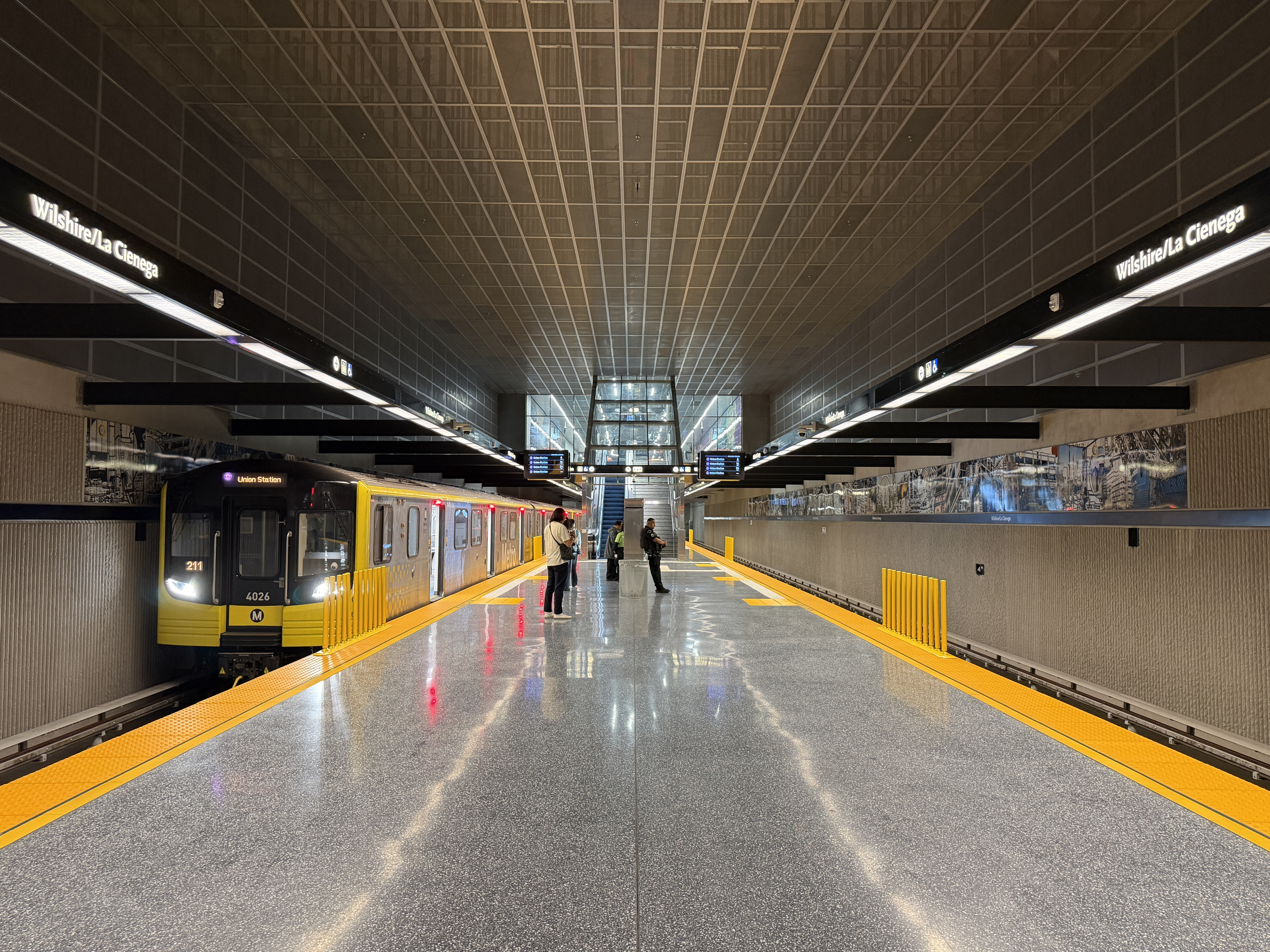
Platform level at the Wilshire/La Cienega station on its opening day.

Beverly Hills is served by the D Line subway. On May 8, 2026 service to the Wilshire/La Cienega station commenced. In 2027, service to the Beverly Drive station will commence, giving Beverly Hills two subway stations. The D Line provides direct service to Union Station in Downtown Los Angeles. By 2027, the line will have direct service to neighboring Westwood.

== Media ==
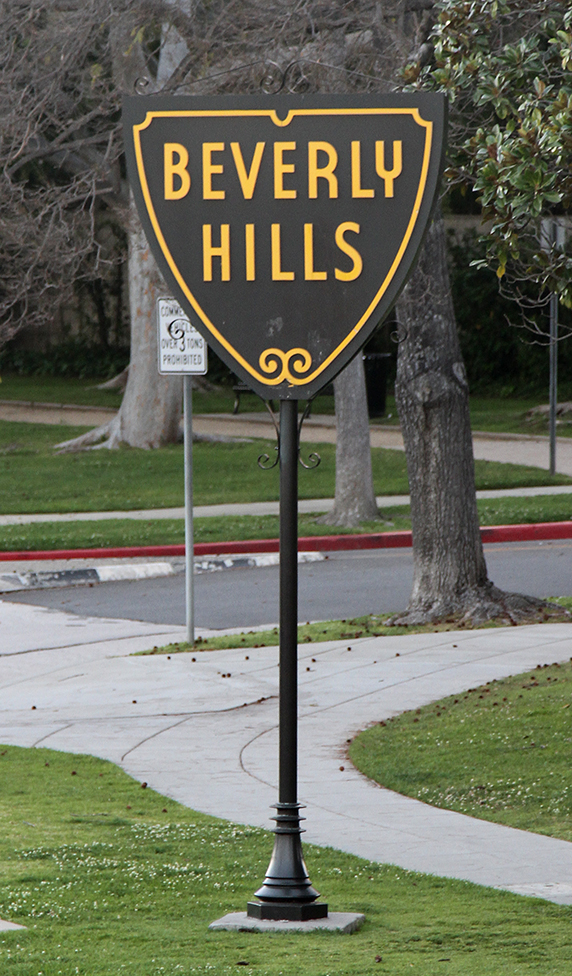
Sign marking the Beverly Hills city limit

Beverly Hills is served by free weekly newspapers The Beverly Hills Courier and Beverly Hills Weekly.

The BHUSD has a public-access television station called KBEV, which is run by the students of Beverly Hills High School.

== Landmarks ==
- Beverly Gardens Park
- Beverly Hills 9/11 Memorial Garden
- Beverly Hills City Hall
- Beverly Hills High School
- Beverly Hills Hotel
- Beverly Hills Police Department
- Beverly Hills Public Library
- Beverly Hills Women's Club
- Beverly Wilshire Hotel
- Electric Fountain
- Greystone Mansion
- Greenacres
- La Cienega Park
- Misty Mountain
- Pickfair
- Rodeo Drive
- Roxbury Memorial Park
- Virginia Robinson Gardens
- Will Rogers Memorial Park

== In popular culture ==
Beverly Hills 90210 logo

Beverly Hills frequently appears in popular culture as a place of conspicuous wealth or luxury, although the actual demographics of the city are more complex. In some films, such as 1990's Pretty Woman, substantial filming took place in the city; in many others, however, such as Beverly Hills Cop (1984), little is shown besides establishing shots of landmarks such as the Beverly Hills Hotel and Rodeo Drive.

In television, the scene in the opening credits of The Andy Griffith Show (1960–1968), in which Sheriff Taylor and Opie carry fishing poles past a pond, was shot at the Franklin Canyon Reservoir north of the city, just west of Coldwater Canyon. The CBS sitcom The Beverly Hillbillies (1962–1971) followed a hillbilly family who relocate to Beverly Hills from the Ozarks. The city also features in the name of the 1990s soap opera Beverly Hills, 90210, revolving around the lives of teenagers attending the fictional West Beverly Hills High School.

The Real Housewives of Beverly Hills is a reality television franchise.

Beverly Hills appears in the 2005 video game Tony Hawk's American Wasteland. It is where the player's skatepark is located, also being featured as an area the player can steal items for the skatepark.

== Sister cities ==
- Acapulco, Mexico
- Cannes, France
- Herzliya, Israel
- Pudong, China

== See also ==
- List of largest houses in the Los Angeles metropolitan area

== Bibliography ==
- Beverly Hills: 1930–2005 by Marc Wanamaker ISBN 9780738546599
- Beverly Hills: An Illustrated History by Genevieve Davis ISBN 978-0-89781-238-2
- Beverly Hills: Inside the Golden Ghetto by Walter Wagner Published 1976
- History of Beverly Hills by Pierce E. Benedict. Published 1934.
