= Andrew H. Denker =

German-born American businessman (1840–1892)

- Born: October 17, 1840; Brunswick
- Died: November 13, 1892 (aged 52); Rancho Rodeo de las Aguas
- Relatives: Henry Hammel (brother-in-law)

Andrew Henry Denker (October 17, 1840 – November 13, 1892) was a German-born American businessman and politician was a business partner of Henry Hammel. He and Hammel, his brother-in-law, ran hotels and owned an extensive spread of agricultural property that eventually became the city of Beverly Hills, California.

== Personal life ==
Denker was born in Brunswick, near Bremen, Germany, on October 17, 1840, a farmer's son. He began working in a shop in Brunswick, but in 1857 he sailed for New York City, where he again found employment in a store, then beginning a small business of his own. In 1863 he voyaged to San Francisco via the Panama Isthmus, soon prospecting for minerals in Arizona and New Mexico. He entered Los Angeles afterward, penniless, but found employment as a clerk in a hotel first named the Lafayette, then the Cosmopolitan and finally the St. Elmo Hotel. At that time it was owned by Kohl, Dockwiler and Fluhe, but later it became the property of Hammel and Denker.

Denker was married to Louise A. Ruellan of France, sister to Marie (above), and they had five children, Marie (later Mrs. Louis Lichtenberger), Antoinette (Mrs. George Lichtenberger), Leontine and Isabel, and Louis. They lived at 223 West 24th Street.

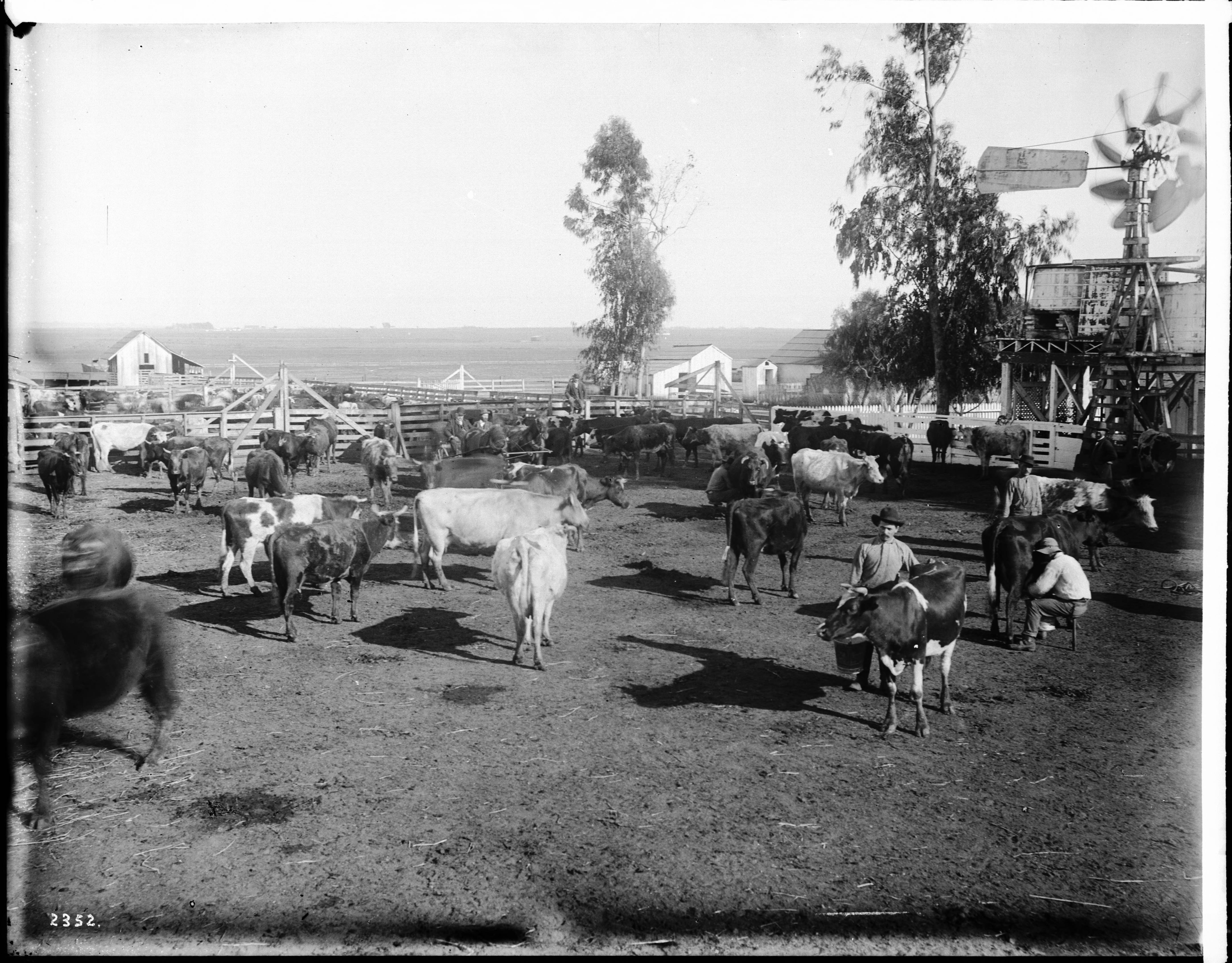
Dairy herd on Hammel and Denker ranch, ca.1905

Denker died on November 13, 1892, at the Rodeo de las Aguas ranch, the diagnosis being Bright's disease.

His will provided for legacies to his family, identified in the Herald at the time as wife Louise A. and children Mary M. Lichtenberger, Antoinette Lichtenberger, Leontine V. Denker, Isabella C. Mayer and Louis A. Denker, and two brothers and a sister. His estate was estimated informally to be about a million dollars.

== Memberships ==
In 1873-74 A.H. Denker was elected as a member of the Kern County Board of Supervisors, and despite the fact that he favored retaining Havilah as the county seat, a popular election decided 354 to 332 to move the seat of government to Bakersfield.

Denker was a director of the Los Angeles Horticultural Society, which was dissolved in June 1882. The Times reported: "Thus passes to rest a society which started out under the most promising auspices, and after a varied career of five years gave up the ghost."

He was also one of the charter members of the Los Angeles Chamber of Commerce in 1888. One of his preoccupations one the construction of "the largest hotel in Southern California" on Tenth Street in Los Angeles, a development that was never completed because of economic conditions.

== Partnership ==
It was noted in 1904 that Hammel and Denker had been partners "in all their hotel and farming ventures, and when Hamel [sic] died his partner continued to administer the partnership as before until he, too, died. And even then it was a necessity almost to deal with the two estates as a single entity."

The two men had the same attorney, J. D. Bicknell, "and upon him devolved the burden of reducing order out of chaos." The appraised value of the Hammel estate was $534,428.04, and that of the Denker estate was $338,053.

=== Hotels ===
In 1864, Denker was in Havilah in Kern County, where he was operating the Delphi Hotel with John J. Hendrickson. It was a profitable enterprise because Havilah was then the county seat and headquarters for stage lines running between Visalia, California, and Los Angeles.

According to most sources, the partners then leased the United States Hotel at the corner of Requena and Main streets in Los Angeles, in 1869. (Another source states that Hammel "and a partner named Bremerman leased the United States Hotel on February 1st [1869] from Louis Mesmer.") They kept the hotel until "the opening of the great real-estate boom of 1886." They were also the proprietors of the St. Elmo Hotel, later renamed the Cosmopolitan.

In 1890, the Hammel and Denker Building was built at the northwest corner of Third and Spring streets in Los Angeles. Only nine years later it would make way for the Douglas Building (1899) which still stands in the location now.

=== Ranching ===
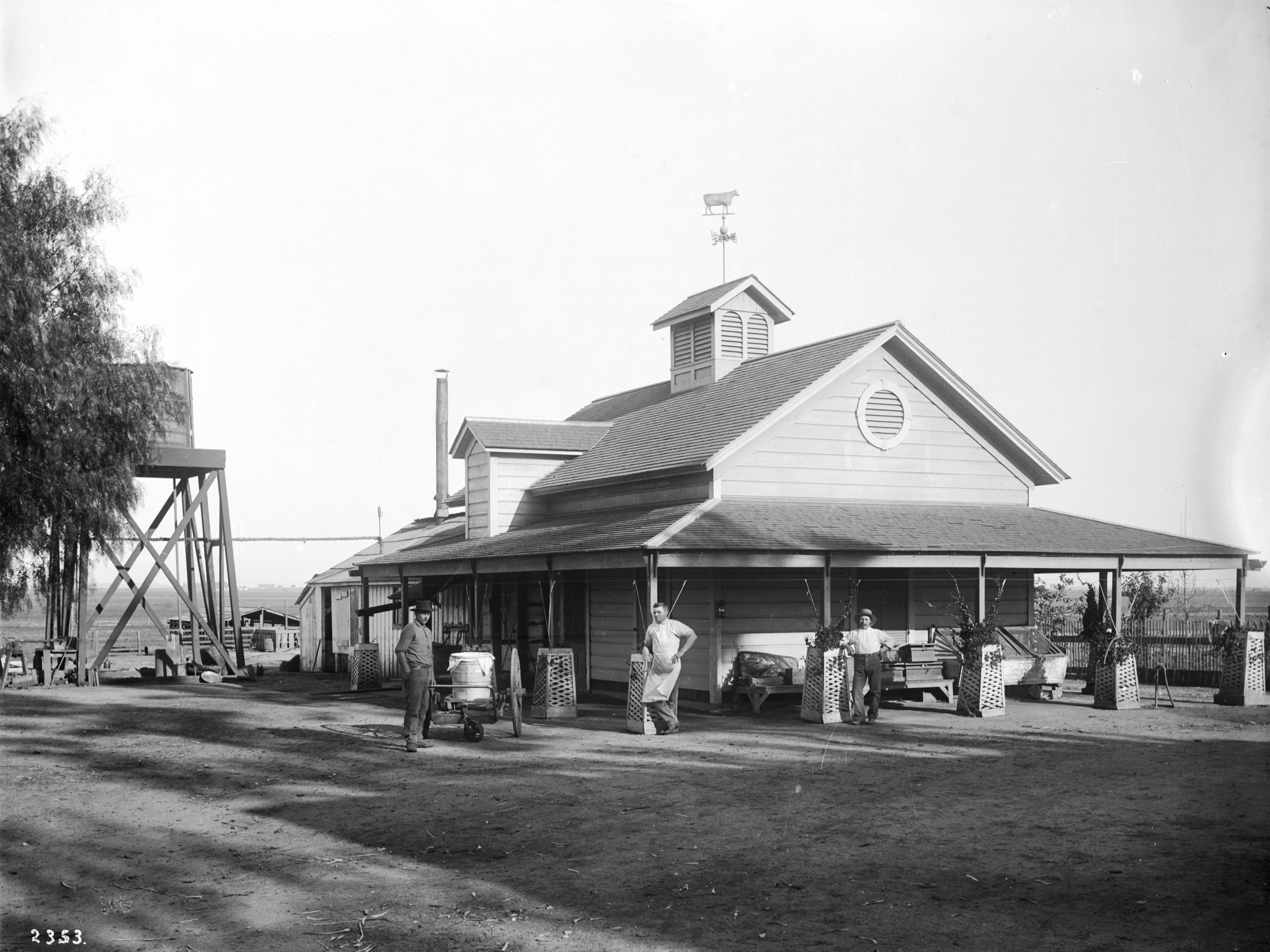
Creamery on Hammel and Denker ranch, Beverly Hills, ca.1905

Edward Preuss purchased the Rancho Rodeo de las Aguas in 1868 from landowners Benjamin D. Wilson and Henry Hancock "with the intention of establishing a colony for German immigrants"; these plans, though, were ruined by a drought and Hammel and Denker bought the land in the 1880s. It was noted as "a fertile stretch of over thirty-five hundred acres of valley and frostless foothill land lying between Los Angeles and Santa Monica." They "planted bean fields to help pay taxes[,] but their ultimate dream was establishing a North African-themed subdivision called Morocco. However, this fantasyland disappeared in 1888 when the national economy collapsed."

The extensive rancho was managed as a "grain and stock business" by Henry H. Denker, Andrew's brother, for more than thirty years.

In 1889, Denker and Hammel donated a 30-foot right-of-way over the rancho to the Los Angeles and Pacific Railway, which was building a line to Santa Monica, "in return for ten-year passes on the railroad and the promise to build a depot and two flag-stops on the ranch."

== Legacy ==
The city of Beverly Hills, California, is the principal legacy of the two brothers-in-law. Their 3,055-acre swath of land "lying between Hollywood and Sherman and extending from the hills to the lowest portion of the plane [sic]," had "oil, plenty of water and fine high soil as well as low land, where the soil is of heavy body," as one account put it in 1905 when the rancho was about to be put on the market.

Earlier, though, shortly after Denker's death, there was an auction at the ranch of "Horses, cows, heifers, milk wagons, farmer wagons, carriages, four-seated tourists' wagon and buggies, two headers, mowers, barrows . . . All the farming implements and tools; also one team of imported Shetland ponies (black). The celebrated trotting stallion Prince Edward. . . . Lunch will be served."
