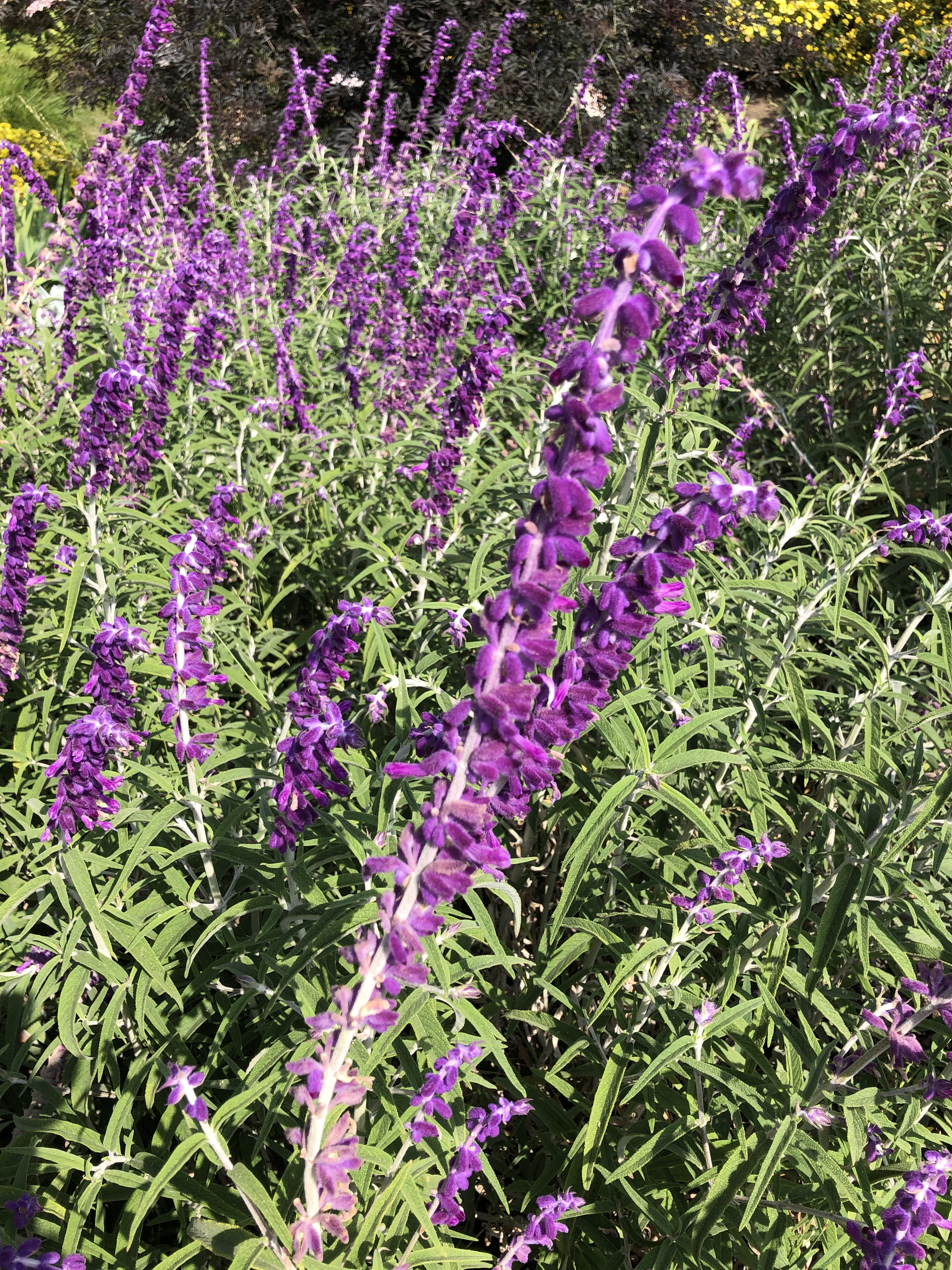

Scientific classification
- Kingdom: Plantae
- Clade: Tracheophytes
- Clade: Angiosperms
- Clade: Eudicots
- Clade: Asterids
- Order: Lamiales
- Family: Lamiaceae
- Genus: Salvia
- Species: S. leucantha

Binomial name
- Salvia leucantha Cav.

= Salvia leucantha =

Species of flowering plant

Salvia leucantha, or Mexican bush sage, is a herbaceous perennial plant in the family Lamiaceae that is native to subtropical and tropical conifer forests in central and eastern Mexico. The flowers are usually white, emerging from coloured bracts. It is not frost hardy, but is often grown in warmer latitudes for its prominent arching velvety blue or purple inflorescences.

It grows up to 1.3 m (4.3 ft) high and 2 m (6.6 ft) wide, with numerous erect stems, often arching at their tips, and with long inflorescences. The linear-lanceolate leaves are a soft mid-green, with whitish, hairy undersides.

== Cultivation ==
This plant has ornamental value in the garden, and has gained the Royal Horticultural Society's Award of Garden Merit. It is a low-maintenance plant that grows best in full sun and moist but well-drained soils. Flowers attract butterflies, bees and hummingbirds.

== Etymology ==
The Latin specific epithet Leucantha means 'white-flowered'.

== Uses ==
A recent analysis of the essential oil of S. leucantha found it to be rich in the sesquiterpene hydrocarbons; β-caryophyllene, α-guaiene, cis-muurola-3,5-diene, germacrene D, and bicyclogermacrene. Bornyl acetate constituted 23.9% of the oil.
