= Henry Hammel (California businessman) =

German-born American businessman and politician

Member of the Los Angeles City Council for the 2nd ward
- In office December 9, 1882 – December 9, 1884

Personal details
- Born: c. 1833/1834 Germany
- Died: September 3, 1890 (aged 56–57) Los Angeles, California
- Relatives: Andrew H. Denker (brother-in-law)

Henry Hammel (c. 1833/1834 – September 3, 1890) was a German-born American businessman and politician was a business partner of Andrew H. Denker. He served on the Los Angeles Common Council from December 9, 1882, to December 9, 1884, and, with the help of his brother-in-law Denker, ran hotels and owned an extensive spread of agricultural property that eventually became the city of Beverly Hills, California.

== Personal life ==
Hammel was born in Germany and came to the United States in 1833 or 1834 and engaged in hotel-keeping. He was also interested in grape-growing and owned a large vineyard in Los Angeles.

He was married in 1869 or 1870 to Marie Ruellan of Paris, France. On July 26, 1875, their only daughter, Mathilde or Matilda, was born in the United States Hotel, of which her father was the owner. When grown, she married E.O. McLaughlin.

Hammel died September 3, 1890, at the age of 56 or 57, leaving his wife and their 16-year-old daughter. At the time of his death they were living in the family house at the corner of 7th Street and Grand Avenue.

In a will, he bequeathed his estate, valued at $400,000, to his wife and his daughter.

== Politics ==
In 1865 Hammel was elected to the first Kern County Board of Supervisors upon that area's organization as a county., and he was later elected to represent the 2nd Ward on the Los Angeles Common Council for two one-year terms between 1882 and 1884. In that capacity he was noted for "saving the Westlake Park to the city, and was also prominently connected with obtaining the water right of the Los Feliz rancho for Los Angeles."

== Partnership with Denker ==
It was noted in 1904 that Hammel and his brother-in-law Andrew H. Denker had been partners "in all their hotel and farming ventures, and when Hamel [sic] died his partner continued to administer the partnership as before until he, too, died. And even then it was a necessity almost to deal with the two estates as a single entity."

The two men had the same attorney, J. D. Bicknell, "and upon him devolved the burden of reducing order out of chaos." The appraised value of the Hammel estate was $534,428.04, and that of the Denker estate was $338,053.

=== Hotels ===
In 1862 or 1863, Hammel was proprietor of the Bella Union Hotel, the leading hotel in Los Angeles, later renamed the Saint Charles. In 1864, Hammel sold his interest in the Bella Union and went to Kern County, where there was a gold rush. Both Hammel and Denker located in Havilah and built a hotel there, naming it, again, the Bella Union. It was a profitable business for a time, but when the rush declined, about 1868, Hammel returned to Los Angeles, with Denker remaining behind to close up the business.

According to most sources, the partners then leased the United States Hotel, at the corner of Requena and Main streets in Los Angeles, in 1869. (Another source states that Hammel "and a partner named Bremerman leased the United States Hotel on February 1st [1869] from Louis Mesmer.") They kept the hotel until "the opening of the great real-estate boom of 1886." They were also the proprietors of the St. Elmo Hotel, later renamed the Cosmopolitan.

In 1890, the Hammel and Denker Building was built at the northwest corner of Third and Spring streets in Los Angeles. Only nine years later it would make way for the Douglas Building (1899) which still stands in the location now.

=== Ranching ===
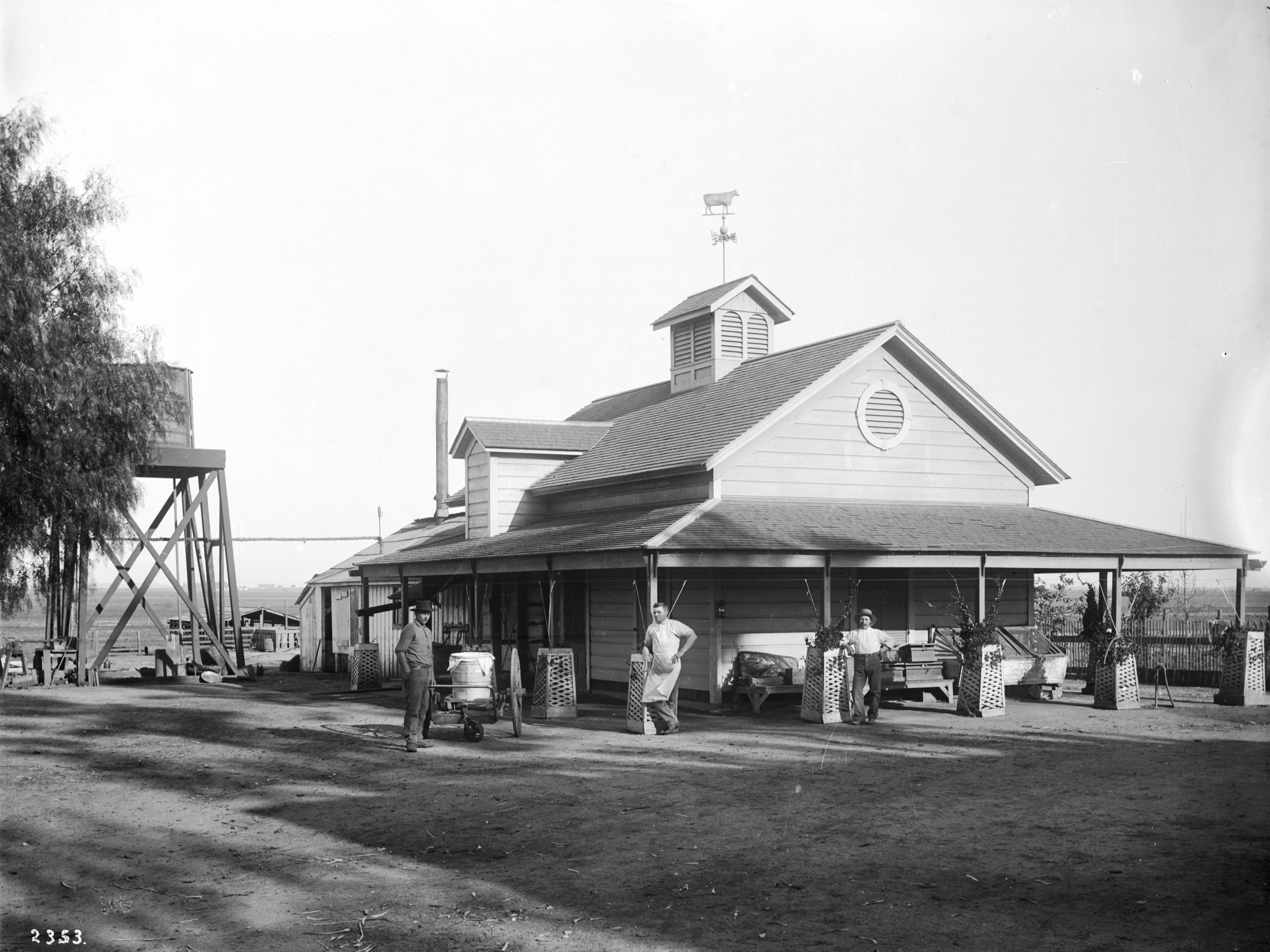
Creamery on Hammel and Denker ranch, Beverly Hills, ca.1905

Edward Preuss purchased the Rancho Rodeo de las Aguas in 1868 from landowners Benjamin D. Wilson and Henry Hancock "with the intention of establishing a colony for German immigrants"; these plans, though, were ruined by a drought and Hammel and Denker bought the land in the 1880s. It was noted as "a fertile stretch of over thirty-five hundred acres of valley and frostless foothill land lying between Los Angeles and Santa Monica." They "planted bean fields to help pay taxes[,] but their ultimate dream was establishing a North African-themed subdivision called Morocco. However, this fantasyland disappeared in 1888 when the national economy collapsed."

In 1889 Denker and Hammel donated a 30-foot right-of-way over the rancho to the Los Angeles and Pacific Railway, which was building a line to Santa Monica, "in return for ten-year passes on the railroad and the promise to build a depot and two flag-stops on the ranch."

== Legacy ==
The city of Beverly Hills, California, is the principal legacy of the two brothers-in-law. Their 3,055-acre swath of land "lying between Hollywood and Sherman and extending from the hills to the lowest portion of the plane [sic]," had "oil, plenty of water and fine high soil as well as low land, where the soil is of heavy body," as one account put it in 1905 when the rancho was about to be put on the market.
