= William F. Herrin =

American lawyer

- Herrin in 1905
- Born: William Franklin Herrin; August 7, 1854; Jacksonville, Oregon, U.S.
- Died: February 28, 1927 (aged 72); San Francisco, California, U.S.
- Resting place: Cypress Lawn Memorial Park
- Occupations: Lawyer, businessman, banker, real estate developer

William Franklin Herrin (August 7, 1854 – February 28, 1927) was an American lawyer, businessman, banker and real estate developer.

== Biography ==
A cartoon published in The San Francisco Call depicting Herrin manipulating Republican bosses Phil Crimmins and Martin Kelly in the primary elections, August 24, 1900. Herrin's nose and hair is exaggerated to resemble Satan.

Herrin assisted William Sharon (1821-1885) in his acrimonious divorce from his wife Sarah. He subsequently became Chief Counsel for the Sharon estate and the Spring Valley Company. Later, he served as Chief Counsel of the Southern Pacific Railroad, where he was critical of government overregulations. He allegedly nominated gubernatorial candidates, supreme court justices, and appellate court judges. In 1908, in the San Francisco Call, James W. Rea, a former associate, accused him and Jere Burke of corruption over bonds of the San Jose and Los Gatos Interurban Railroad Company.

In 1900, together with Burton E. Green (1868-1965), Charles A. Canfield (1848-1913), Max Whittier (1867–1928), Frank H. Buck (1887-1942), Henry E. Huntington (1850-1927), William G. Kerckhoff (1856–1929), W.S. Porter and Frank H. Balch, known as the Amalgamated Oil Company, he purchased Rancho Rodeo de las Aguas from Henry Hammel and Andrew H. Denker and renamed it Morocco Junction. After drilling for oil and only finding water, they reorganized their business into the Rodeo Land and Water Company to develop a new residential town later known as Beverly Hills, California.

He served on the Board of Directors of Wells Fargo from 1904 to 1918. From 1904 to 1906, he worked with John Muir to convince Congress to include the Yosemite Valley as part of the Yosemite National Park. He was a member of the Bohemian Club and the Committee of Fifty (1906).

=== Personal life ===
Herrin resided at 2530 Broadway at Scott Street in San Francisco, California, in a house designed by architect Julius E. Krafft.

== Bibliography ==
- Herrin, William F. (1914). Government Regulation of Railways. Vol. 2. California Law Review. pp. 87–103.
- Herrin, William F. (1919). Public duties of educated men : an address. Oregon Agricultural College.
