= William G. Kerckhoff =

American businessman

William George Kerckhoff
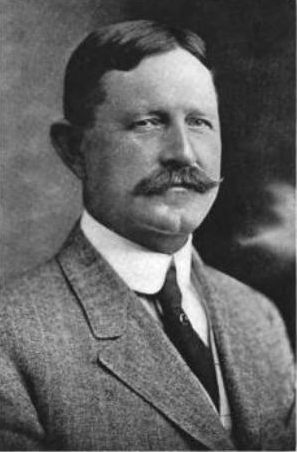
- Born: March 30, 1856; Terre Haute, Indiana, U.S.
- Died: February 22, 1929 (aged 72); Los Angeles, California
- Occupation: Businessman
- Spouse: Louisa Eshman Kerckhoff

William George Kerckhoff (1856–1929) was an American businessman.

== Early life ==
Kerckhoff was born on March 30, 1856, in Terre Haute, Indiana.

== Career ==
Kerckhoff moved to Los Angeles County, California, from Indiana in 1878–1879 and worked for the Jackson Lumber Company. In 1887, along with James Cuzner of the Kerckhoff-Cuzner Lumber Company, he built the Pasadena. It was the first ocean-going vessel to use oil for fuel. In the 1890s, he founded the San Gabriel Power Company, a hydroelectric power company in Los Angeles. By the turn of the century, together with A.C. Balch, he owned half the stock of Henry E. Huntington's Pacific Light & Power Company used to provide electricity to Pacific Electric, and he served as its president. In 1902, they purchased the San Joaquin Electric Company. They also founded Southern California Gas Corporation in 1910, and built a 120-mile pipeline from the San Joaquin Valley to Los Angeles.

In 1906, with Burton E. Green (1868–1965), Charles A. Canfield (1848–1913), Max Whittier (1867–1928), Frank H. Buck (1887–1942), Henry E. Huntington (1850–1927), William F. Herrin (1854–1927), W.S. Porter and Frank H. Balch, known as the Amalgamated Oil Company, he purchased Rancho Rodeo de las Aguas from the heirs of Henry Hammel and Andrew H. Denker. After drilling for oil and only finding water, they reorganized their business into the Rodeo Land and Water Company to develop a new residential town later known as Beverly Hills, California.

As president of the South Coast Land Company, he also helped found the city of Del Mar, California. and the small town of Biola, California.

== Personal life ==
Kerckhoff married Louisa Eshman of Terre Haute in 1883. They lived in a grand mansion at 734 West Adams Boulevard designed by the architects Sumner Hunt (1865–1938), Abraham Wesley Eager (1864–1930) and Silas Reese Burns (1855–1940). Originally donated to the University of Southern California for use as the Louise E. Kerckhoff Medical Sciences Laboratory, it now stands at the center of USC's Annenberg Research Park.

== Death and legacy ==
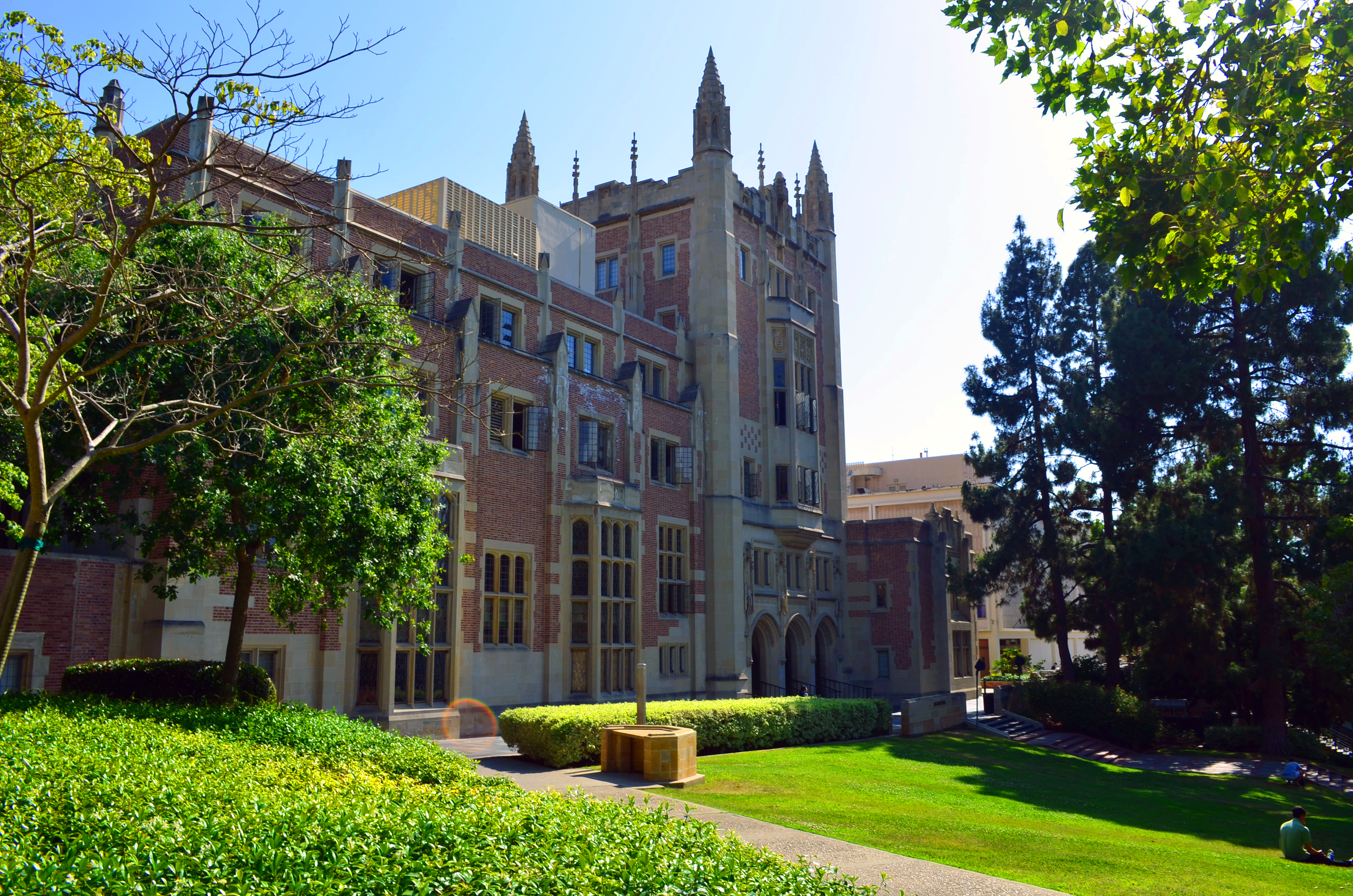
Kerckhoff Hall at UCLA

Kerckhoff died in Los Angeles on February 22, 1929.

The Kerckhoff Marine Laboratory in Corona del Mar, Newport Beach is named in his honor, as are the "Max Planck Institute for Heart and Lung Research - W.G. Kerckhoff Institute" and the "Kerckhoff-Klinik" (a hospital for cardiology, cardiac surgery, pulmology, thoracic surgery, and rheumatology, affiliated with the University of Giessen School of Medicine and part of the William G. Kerckhoff Foundation), both in Bad Nauheim, Germany. The William G. Kerckhoff Laboratories of the Biological Sciences at Caltech were built in 1928 to house the Institute's new biology division. Kerckhoff Hall, designed by Allison & Allison, is home to various student media, clubs, and organizations on the UCLA campus. It was the result of a US$815,000 ($100,000 for furnishing) donation from his widow Louisa. The Kerckhoff Building and Annex in Downtown Los Angeles, listed on the National Register of Historic Places, is also named for him.
