= Associated Oil Company =

American oil and gas company

- Industry: Oil, Gas, Petrochemicals, Transportation
- Founded: October 7, 1901
- Defunct: 1938
- Fate: Acquired by the Tidewater Oil Company
- Headquarters: San Francisco, California, U.S.
- Area served: Pacific West Coast, Hawaii, Orient
- Products: Gasoline, Motor Oil, Kerosene, Lubricants

Associated Oil Company (Flying A) was an American oil and gas company once headquartered in San Francisco, California and served much of the Pacific West Coast, including Hawaii, as well as the Orient and merged with the Tide Water Oil Company in 1936.

== History ==
=== Founding and early years ===
In the year 1900, a pipeline salesman by the name of W.S. Porter convinced the presidents of the five largest companies in the Kern River Oil Field of California to enter into an agreement to turn over their oil interests to form a new company in exchange for stocks and bonds for the appraised value of their properties. The presidents of the companies were: W. G. Kerckhoff for Reed Crude Oil Company; Burton E. Green for Green-Whittier Oil Company; Charles A. Canfield for Canfield Oil Company; M. H. Whittier for Kern Oil Company; John A. Bunting for San Joaquin Oil & Development Company. Securing agreements from 34 other oil companies in the area the Associated Oil Company was incorporated on October 7, 1901, and on January 1, 1902, began actively producing and marketing crude oil.

The Standard Oil Company and the Southern Pacific Railroad acquired an interest in Associated Oil for the purposes of transporting their own oil to the San Francisco Bay Area where it would be refined and marketed; jointly, the Southern Pacific needed fuel for its railroad steam engines. The Matson's Pacific Oil and Transportation Company was acquired in 1905, which included the Coalinga-Monterey pipeline and a refinery at Gaviota, California, including other marine facilities.

=== Subsidiaries ===
In 1907, the Associated Pipe Line Company was formed as a subsidiary of the Associated Oil Company with the Southern Pacific Company providing property along its railroad tracks which ran from the Bakersfield Kern River oil fields to Port Costa, California, later being shipped to China and other parts of the world. The Southern Pacific Company attained the controlling interest of the Associated Oil Company's stock.

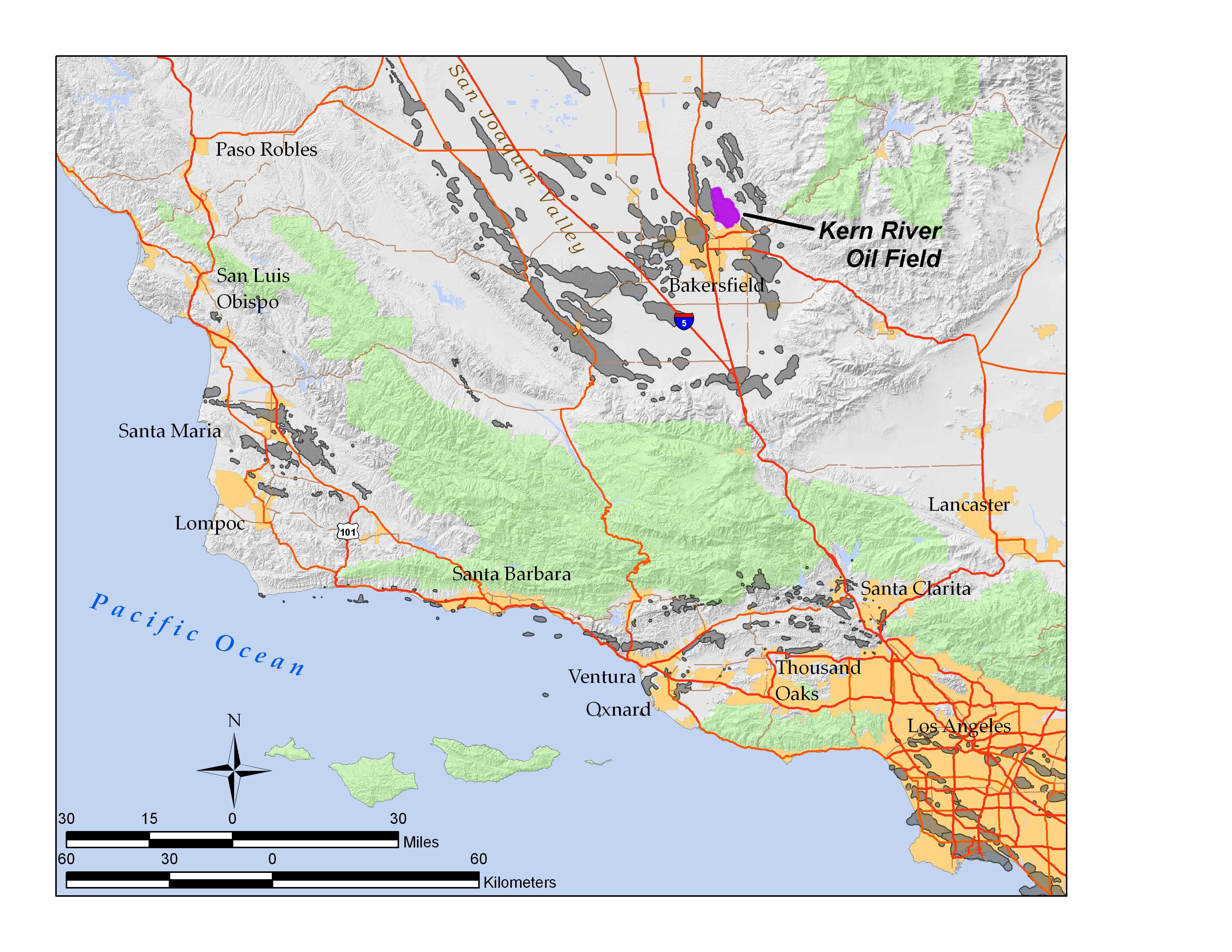
The Kern River Oil Field (purple) in south-central California. Other oil fields are shown in gray.

There was a fast-growing market on the Pacific for petroleum distillates as well as crude oil and since the high gravity crude oil from the San Joaquin Valley required some sort of refining to make fuel usable for locomotives and ship burners, the Associated Oil Company decided to construct a topping plant called the Avon Refinery (now the Golden Eagle Refinery) in 1913. Until then the company had produced and marketed fuel oils only and with the completion of the refinery were launched into the manufacture of gasoline and kerosene.

Also in 1913, unfavorable commuting conditions prompted the Associated Oil Company to build a company town called the Avon Village and by 1920 consisted of 65 cottages, a one-room schoolhouse, worker's bunkhouse, a dining hall and a clubhouse that included an indoor swimming pool, auditorium and a two-lane bowling alley which serves today as the Refinery Museum. A branch of the United States Post Office was established and named the Associated Post Office.

Associated purchased the Amoroco Terminal in 1923 from the American-Oriental Refining Company (AMORCO) and consisted of a topping plant, storage tanks, a wharf, pipelines and pumping equipment. The next year a clarifying plant and an Edeleanu liquid dioxide plant, the first in the United States, were constructed at the Avon Refinery. The quality of the oils treated was so excellent that it prompted the U.S. Navy to purchase these lubricants exclusively from the Avon Refinery for many years. By 1925 the Avon Refinery became the first West Coast refinery to produce gasoline with tetraethyl lead additive and in 1926 the tanker ship S.S. McKittrick received the first crude receipt at the Amorco Wharf. The Southern Pacific Company bought the terminal in 1929 to construct a new railroad drawbridge a year later.

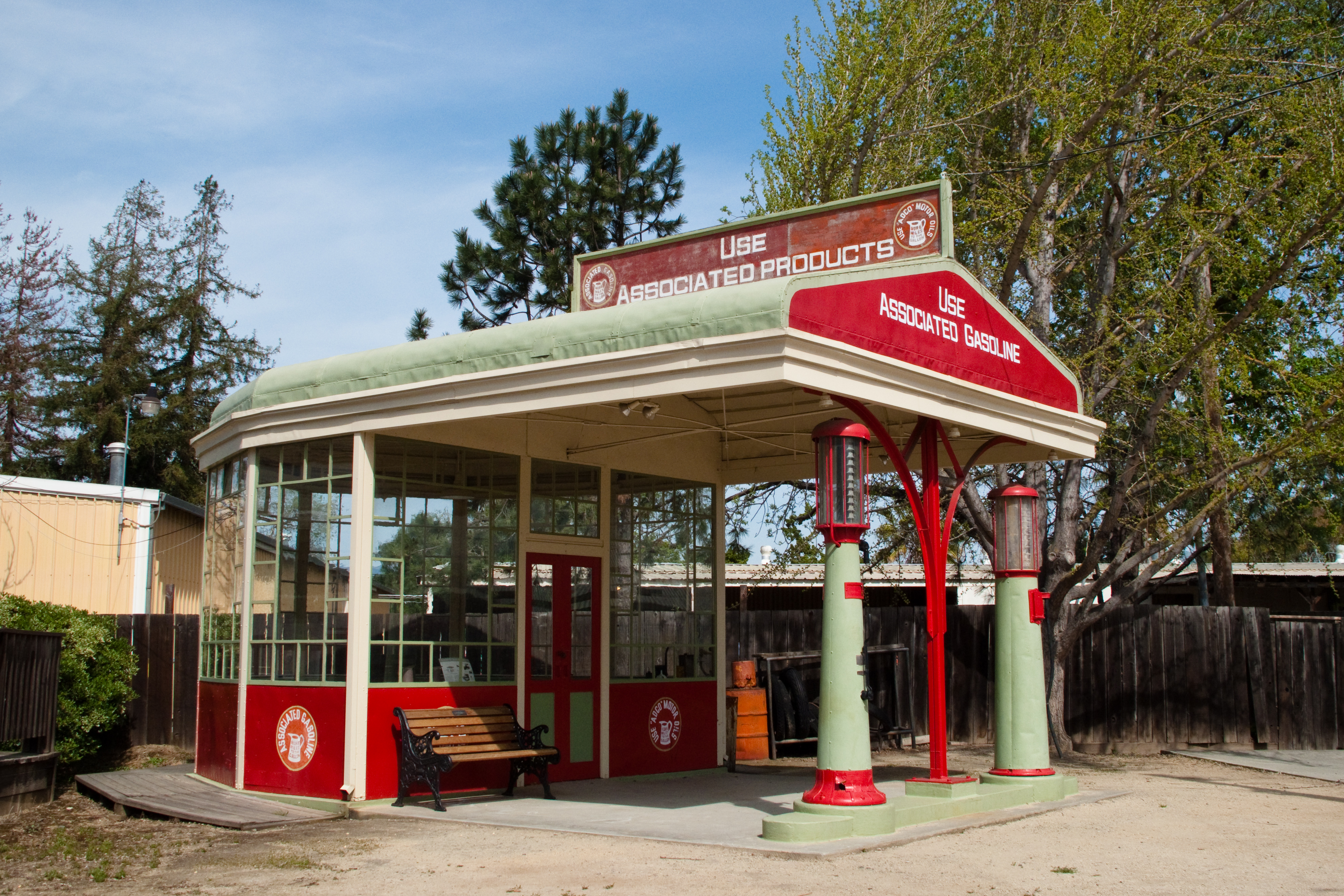
Associated Oil service station from 1927, restored and moved to History Park at Kelley Park in San Jose, California

In 1926, the Associated Oil Company stock owned by the Pacific Oil Company, which was formed by Southern Pacific Company to handle their oil interests, was sold to a new holding company, the Tide Water Associated Oil Company, which also acquired the Tide Water Oil Company at the same time. Standard Oil of New Jersey, the largest stockholder in Tide Water at the time, later formed a holding company, Mission Corporation, to hold the stocks of Tide Water and Associated.

In 1931, the Associated Oil Company joined with Mitsubishi to establish Mitsubishi Oil in Japan, before establishing the Manchurian Oil Company in Dalian under the Japanese wartime regime in 1934.

Beginning in 1934, Associated Oil Company commissioned a series of photographs to be taken to record the progress of construction on the Golden Gate Bridge and San-Francisco Oakland Bay Bridge projects. The projects were of special interest to the Associated Oil Company because they provided Flying A Gasoline and Cycol Motor Oil almost entirely for the projects.

=== Formation into Tidewater Associated Oil Company ===
Getty acquired control of the Mission Corporation in 1937. The previous year, the Tide Water and Associated companies were dissolved to form the Tidewater Associated Oil Company. Across the West Pacific service stations became "Associated Flying A" while stations in the East became "Tydol Flying A". Eventually, the Tydol and Associated brands faded and simply became "Flying A". The company dropped "Associated" from its name in 1956.

== Legacy ==
A restored Associated Oil service station originally opened in 1927 in San Jose is exhibited within History Park at Kelley Park.
