= Thomas A. O'Donnell =

American businessman (1870–1945)

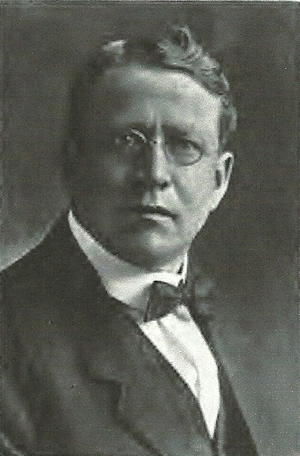
- Thomas A. O'Donnell – Oil magnate (1912)
- Born: Thomas Arthur O'Donnell; December 26, 1870; McKean, Erie County, Pennsylvania, US
- Died: February 21, 1945 (aged 74); Los Angeles, California, US
- Occupations: Oil Tycoon; Miner; Driller; Businessman; Land Speculator; Philanthropist
- Spouses: Lillian Constance Wood; Dr. Winifred Willis
- Children: 2

Thomas Arthur O'Donnell (June 26, 1870 – February 21, 1945), was an American pioneer in the California oil industry along with Edward L. Doheny, Charles A. Canfield and Max H. Whittier who became known as the "big four".

== Early life ==
O'Donnell was born in McKean, Erie County, Pennsylvania to Thomas O'Donnell and Myra Parsons,. He was of Irish descent. While still living in McKean Township he worked for some time as a newsboy until the age 12 when he left Pennsylvania and arrived in Florence, Colorado. He remained there for two years working in an all-around capacity as a grocery store clerk.

With his ambitions extending beyond the grocery store, O'Donnell went to work in a gold mine and for the next five years, with pick and shovel, became a very experienced miner by the age of 19. In 1889 he gave up mining and headed to California where he obtained a position at the Union Oil Company in Ventura County remaining there for four years where he mastered the oil business.

== Career ==
Leaving Union Oil in 1893, O'Donnell went to Los Angeles where he met Edward L. Doheny, a wealthy pioneer in the development of oil in California. Working as a field superintendent for Doheny for about a year, O'Donnell too saw the promise that the oil fields held and decided to go into business for himself forming a partnership drilling oil wells with Max H. Whittier. The partnership with Whittier lasted for five years, at the end of which, O'Donnell decided to continue alone becoming an independent driller, operator and oil land speculator.

In 1902, O'Donnell entered the oil fields in Coalinga, California, and his success there was one of the most remarkable on record. He organized several companies and financed many of them himself. As well as holding other positions in other companies, O'Donnell held presidencies in the Whittier Consolidated Oil Company, Midland Oil Fields Company, Four Oil Company, Section One Oil Company, Circle Oil Company, Maricopa Star Oil Company, California Star Oil Company, Buena Fe Petroleum and Salvia Oil Company.

When Doheny became interested in Mexican oil holdings in 1907, O'Donnell handled his interests in California and helped form the American Petroleum Company, followed by the American Oil Fields Company, holding the positions of vice-president and field manager of both companies. At the time, the two companies were among the largest independent concerns in the United States controlling wide areas of the best oil lands in the most productive districts of California.

In 1912, the two companies merged into the California Petroleum Corporation, known as CALPET. O'Donnell served as president and board chairman of CALPET until it was sold to the Texas Company (later known as Texaco). O'Donnell became a director in the Texas Company later retiring from that position.

During World War I, O'Donnell served with the Fuel Conservation Board and became national director of oil production for the United States Fuel Administration. Upon his departure, O'Donnell received a letter and check for one dollar from Harry A. Garfield, United States Fuel Administrator, as a token of appreciation in recognition of his service as a volunteer.

O'Donnell became the first president of the American Petroleum Institute, the largest national trade association representing the industry, serving from 1919 – 1924. He was also influential in forming the Independent Oil Producers Association and served as a member of the executive board. O'Donnell held directorships at the Farmers and Merchants National Bank, Mexican Petroleum Company and a number of other Doheny oil companies. He also headed several committees including one to U.S. President Woodrow Wilson regarding the protection of interests in Tampico, Mexico during the Tampico Affair.

== Family ==
O'Donnell met Lillian Constance Wood, a native of California, and married her in 1897. They had two daughters, Ruth O'Donnell Davis (October 24, 1898 – January 28, 1985) and Doris O'Donnell Connolly (January 5, 1901 – 1977). Lillian and O'Donnell divorced in 1924 and a property settlement of $750,000 in cash and security was approved by the court.

A year later he married Dr. Winifred Willis (November 5, 1880 – January 24, 1969), a Long Beach osteopath, in the Willard Hotel in Washington, D.C.. Willis was considered to be one of the most prominent osteopaths in Southern California and a leader in that profession in all the country. Willis was born in New York and married William E. Jenney, a successful dentist, in 1900 and moving to California in 1916. Winifred and William were later divorced in 1924.

== Palm Springs ==
O'Donnell went to Palm Springs, California in the early 1920s seeking relief from a respiratory condition. On 14.96 acres (60,500 m^{2}) of leased land from Nellie Coffman, owner of the Desert Inn, he constructed the 4,100-square-foot (380 m^{2}) home which would become the O'Donnell House – also known as "Ojo del Desierto", or Eye of the Desert. The "California Spanish"-style O'Donnell House was designed by W. C. Tanner and remained the highest mountainside home in Palm Springs for more than forty years.

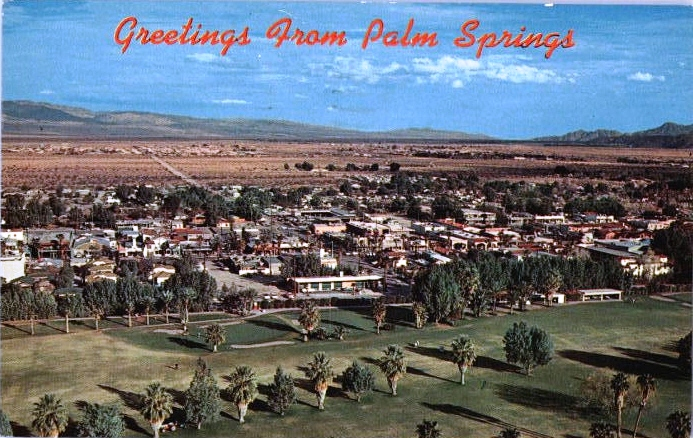
An aerial view of the O'Donnell Golf Club in Palm Springs

For fifteen years, O'Donnell and his wife, Winifred, spent their winters at the O'Donnell House. O'Donnell's heart condition prevented him from using the stairs, so he decided to build a smaller, one story house on the nearby golf course which O'Donnell built with Captain J. F. Lucey. This house would later become the clubhouse for the O'Donnell Golf Club.

The O'Donnell Golf Club was built in Palm Springs in the mid-1920s. He purchased the land in 1925 upon which the O'Donnell Course is now built, as well as seven hundred fifty shares of Whitewater Mutual Water Company and helped it bring fresh water through a pipeline fourteen miles (23 km) from Whitewater Canyon to the desert before anyone knew there was water under Palm Springs.

O'Donnell bought property at the corner of Stevens Road and North Palm Canyon Drive and built a reservoir, which also acted as a desalting basin, through which Whitewater Mutual routed its pipeline to the area that was to become the golf course. O'Donnell was one of the five incorporators of Whitewater Mutual Water Company, which was incorporated on May 5, 1927.

In the following years O'Donnell built the golf course, and for the next fifteen years he operated it at his own expense before, in 1944 he organized the O'Donnell Golf Club as a private, non-profit club. He gave the club a ninety-nine year lease for the golf course, the reservoir property and the seven hundred fifty shares of the Whitewater Mutual stock.

Dozens of benefactions and philanthropies can be attributed to O'Donnell, but probably biggest among these are his making possible, through his financial assistance, the Welwood Memorial Library, the Public Health Center, Welfare and Friendly Aid and the public address system on the mountainside above his home at the edge of the O'Donnell Golf Club.

== Fraternities and clubs ==
As of 1912, O'Donnell was a Thirty-second Degree Mason, a Mystic Shriner and an Elk. He held memberships in the Jonathan Club and Sierra Madre Club, both of Los Angeles, and the Growler's Club of Coalinga. O'Donnell was also president of the O'Donnell Golf Club from 1944 until his death in 1945.

== Death ==
After suffering a heart attack in 1941 during an influenza siege, O'Donnell died of a related heart ailment at the Wilshire Hospital in Los Angeles on February 21, 1945, at the age 74. Before passing he wrote "finis," a Latin word meaning "the end." The funeral services were held at the Church of the Recessional, Forest Lawn Memorial Park. Services were also held at the same time in Palm Springs near the entrance of the O'Donnell Golf Club.
