= Santa Fe Building =

Santa Fe Building may refer to:

- Santa Fe Building (Amarillo), in Amarillo, Texas
- Santa Fe Building (Chicago), in Chicago, Illinois
- Kerckhoff Building and Annex (formerly the Santa Fe Building) in Los Angeles, California
