= Maria Rita Valdez =

Afro-Latina rancher and farmer

María Rita Valdez (c. 1791–1854) also known as Maria Rita Valdez Villa, was an Californio rancher and farmer. Her 4,500-acre ranch, El Rancho Rodeo de las Aguas, later became the Los Angeles County city of Beverly Hills.

== Biography ==
Valdez was born in New Spain in about 1791 to Sebastiana and Eugenio Valdez. Her mother was the daughter of Luis and Maria Quintero, two of the original settlers of Pueblo de Los Angeles (present-day Los Angeles, California). Her great-grandfather was an enslaved African.

Maria married Spanish soldier, Vicente Fernando Villa, in 1808. The couple had three children.

In the 1830s, after her husband's death, Valdez was granted the roughly 4,500-acre El Rancho Rodeo de las Aguas where she ran a cattle ranch, farm and garden. Her adobe was located at what is now Alpine Drive and Sunset Boulevard. Valdez had paid employees, most of whom were native to the area.

In 1854, Valdez sold the ranch to investors Henry Hancock and Benjamin D. Wilson for $4,000.

The Beverly Hills Hotel now stands near the site of her home. A nearby plaque commemorates Valdez and her ranch.
