= Marathon Martinez Renewable Fuels =

Petroleum refinery in California, US

Golden Eagle Refinery
- Interactive map of Golden Eagle Refinery
- Location: Avon, California, California, United States; 38.033363°N 122.071907°W

Refinery details
- Operator: Marathon Petroleum
- Capacity: 157,000 barrels per day (25,000 m^{3}/d)

The Marathon Martinez Renewable Fuels Facility is located in the San Francisco Bay Area in an unincorporated area known as Avon, East of Martinez, California. It refines biobased feedstocks such as animal fat, soybean oil and corn oil into renewable diesel. Previously owned by Tidewater Petroleum, Tosco, Valero Energy, Tesoro and Marathon Petroleum. The refinery is located on 850 acres, in 2016 had approximately 650 full-time employees, and had a crude oil capacity of 157,000 barrels per day. In 2015 it was the fourth-largest refinery in the state. The refinery had a Nelson complexity index of 16.1.

== History ==
Established in 1878–1879, Avon was railroad station named for Shakespeare's Avon. It was originally called Marsh, and in 1913 the name was changed to Associated. The name Marsh was in honor of John Marsh. The name Associated was for the Associated Oil Company, owner of the site.

The refinery was first built in 1913 under the name Avon Refinery, and has been continually expanded since. It was purchased by Tosco in 1976. By the 1990s, a history of poor maintenance and under-staffing gave the refinery a reputation for being a hazardous workplace. Throughout the 1990s, it led the US refining industry in the number of environmental and safety code violations. These poor conditions culminated in two catastrophic accidents. In the first, a 1997 hydrocracker explosion killed one worker. In the second of these, four workers died and a fifth was hospitalized in a 1999 naphtha explosion. A maintenance supervisor refused to shut down the unit after corroding valves failed to stop the flow of the extremely hazardous substance.

In May 2002, the refinery was purchased by Tesoro Petroleum from Valero Energy, along with 70 Ultramar and Beacon gas stations in Northern California, for the total of $1.075 billion.

In November 2010, the refinery had a flaring event, due to a simultaneous PG&E utility power and Foster Wheeler co-generation plant failure, that produced large quantities of thick black smoke.

In February 2015, a nationwide strike by USW represented employees resulted in the closure of the Martinez refinery, the only refinery closure resulting from the strike.

On December 15, 2015, thick smoke and flames could be seen rising up from the refinery. Due to the loss of a primary steam generation unit, flaring was done to release pressure. A level-2 alert was issued to the community, recommending that they stay indoors due to smoke blowing offsite. The alert was reduced to Level 0 on the same day.

Due to the COVID-19 pandemic, the refinery went into idle mode in early 2020 and stopped all production. After nearly half a year, the company decided to shut down production and laid off over 720 employees with the majority of them leaving work on October 28, 2020. Some employees remained as the refinery became a tank and storage facility. In early 2021, the refinery was given to green light to start converting its units so it could produce renewable diesel made from animal tallow, corn oil, and soybean oil. They partnered with Neste in a 50/50 joint venture and began producing renewable diesel in late 2022 and moving up to full capacity in 2023 making it one of the largest renewable diesel refineries in the world.

After the refinery transitioned to manufacturing renewable diesel, it was no longer subject to California's additional safety regulations for operating petroleum refineries, such as additional training requirements for workers, and workers' right to have their safety concerns addressed in writing.

On November 19, 2023, a catastrophic workplace incident left field worker Jerome Serrano severely injured with burns on 90% of his body when a fired heater tube ruptured from overheating, ignited flammable hydrogen and diesel that subsequently engulfed the heater and Serrano, who was following managerial orders to shut off the heater manually when it could have been done remotely.

On April 27, 2026, Unionized employees went on strike, citing unsafe working conditions. As of July 23, 2026 striking workers were locked out and the refinery continues to be operated by an understaffed and undertrained team.
