= Charles A. Canfield =

American oilman (1848–1913)

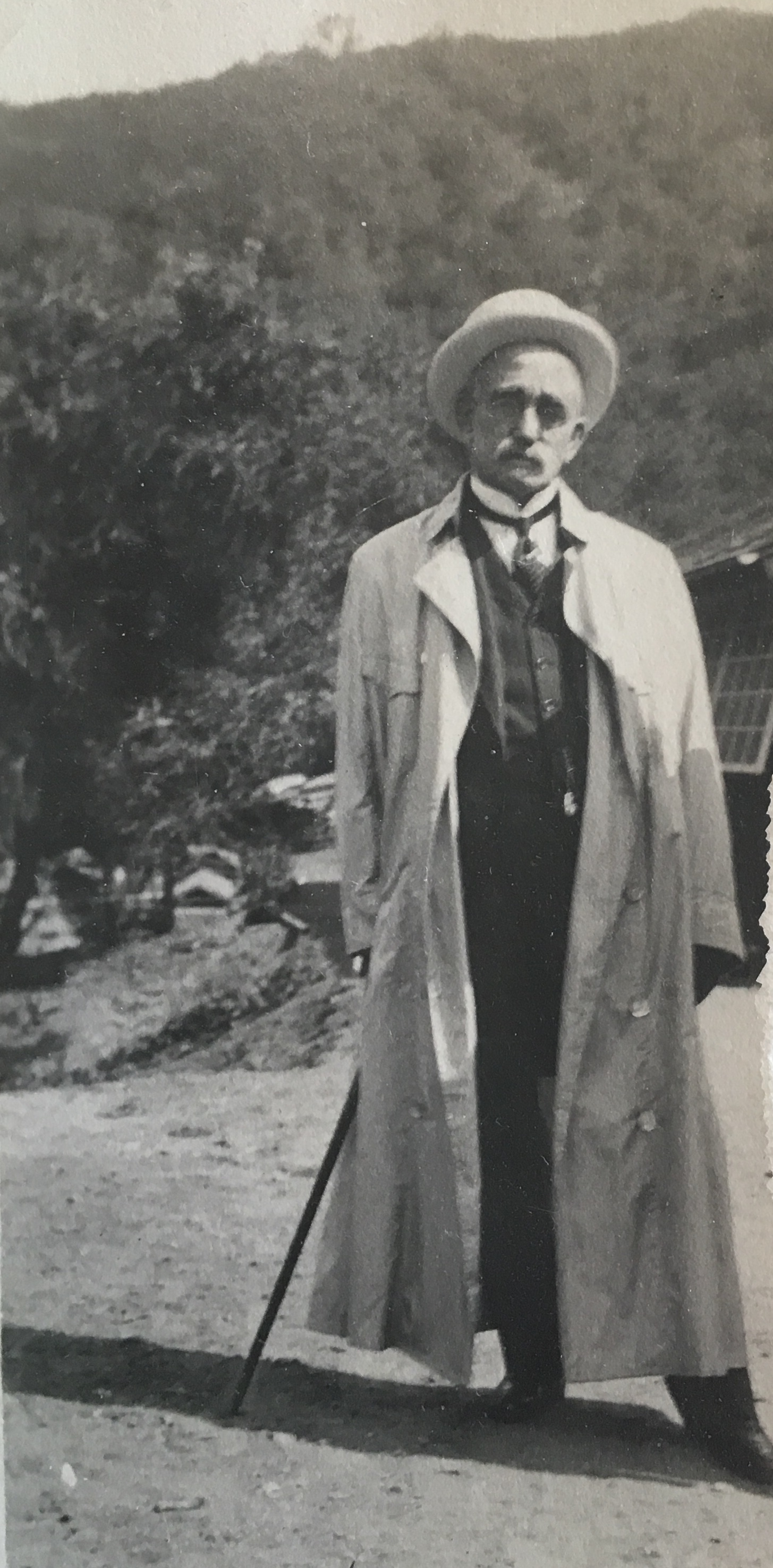
- Early California pioneer and developer
- Born: Charles Adelbert Canfield; May 15, 1848; Springfield, Otsego County, New York, US
- Died: August 15, 1913 (aged 65); Los Angeles, California, US
- Resting place: Evergreen Cemetery, Los Angeles
- Occupations: Oilman, real estate developer
- Spouse: Chloe Canfield
- Children: Daisy (Canfield) Moreno
- Relatives: Antonio Moreno (son-in-law)

Charles Adelbert Canfield (May 15, 1848 – August 15, 1913) was an American oilman and real estate developer. He pioneered oil drilling in California and Mexico. He also co-founded Beverly Hills and Del Mar, California.

== Early life ==
Charles Adelbert Canfield was born on May 15, 1848, in Springfield, Otsego County, New York.

== Career ==
In 1869, he moved to Colorado and struggled to find silver in the American Southwest for seventeen years. In 1886, he found silver in Kingston, New Mexico Territory. In 1887, he moved to Los Angeles, California and founded the Chanslor-Canfield Midway Oil Co.

In 1892, he partnered with Edward L. Doheny to develop the first gusher in Los Angeles at the intersection of Patton and Colton streets on Crown Hill, just northwest of today's Downtown Los Angeles.

In 1900, he and Burton E. Green, Max Whittier, Frank H. Buck, Henry E. Huntington, William F. Herrin and William G. Kerckhoff purchased Rancho Rodeo de las Aguas northwest of downtown L.A. from Henry Hammel and Andrew H. Denker. After drilling for oil and only finding water, they reorganized their business into the Rodeo Land and Water Company to develop a residential town later known as Beverly Hills.

In 1902, they founded the Mexican Eagle Petroleum Company (later known as the Pan American Petroleum and now Pemex), which made Mexico the world's second-largest oil-producing country.

== Personal life and death ==
He was married to Chloe Canfield. She was murdered in 1906 by a disgruntled employee called Morris Buck who had been fired five years earlier for leaving the Canfields' horses unattended and beating them.

They had a daughter, Daisy, who was married to J.M. Danziger, but she divorced him in 1921, citing cruelty. In 1923, she remarried to Antonio Moreno (1887–1967), and they lived in the Canfield-Moreno Estate.

They also had a son, Charles O. Canfield. He was married to Pearl, who divorced him in 1930. The couple served as witnesses to the marriage of silent film stars Marie Prevost and Kenneth Harlan in October 1924.

In 1910, he moved into the newly built Canfield-Wright House in Del Mar, California.

He died at his home in Los Angeles on August 15, 1913, and was buried in the Evergreen Cemetery in Los Angeles.

== Bibliography ==
=== Secondary sources ===
- Nicholas A Curry, The Charles A. Canfield family history: Fellow mining prospector, oilman and business associate of Edward L. Doheny, 1994.
