= Burton E. Green =

American oilman and developer (1868–1965)

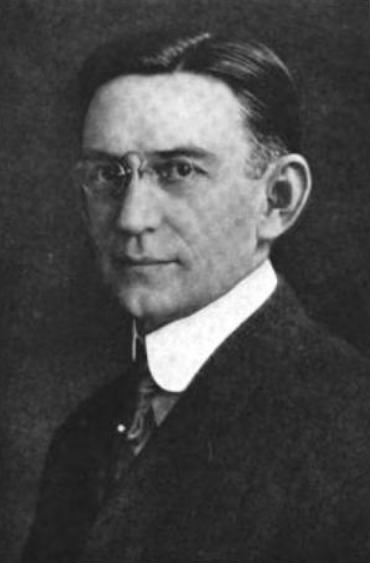
- Burton Edmond Green
- Born: Burton Edmond Green; September 6, 1868; Madison, Wisconsin
- Died: May 13, 1965 (aged 96); Los Angeles County, California
- Resting place: Forest Lawn Memorial Park, Glendale, California
- Education: Beaver Dam Academy, Los Angeles High School
- Occupations: Oilman, real estate developer
- Spouse: Lillian (Wellborn) Green
- Children: 3
- Relatives: Olin Wellborn (father-in-law), Dolly Green (daughter)

Burton Edmond Green (September 6, 1868 – May 13, 1965) was an American oilman and real estate developer. He was critical in the development of Beverly Hills, California, and he is credited with naming it Beverly Hills after Beverly Farms in Massachusetts.

== Early life ==
Burton Edmond Green was born on September 6, 1868, near Madison, Wisconsin. His father was Richard Green and his mother, Amanda Hill (Bush) Green. He attended the Beaver Dam Academy in Wisconsin. He moved to California with his family in 1886, at the age of sixteen. He graduated from the Los Angeles High School in 1889.

== Career ==
Green worked as an orange grower in Redlands, California for five years. He then decided to return to Los Angeles and invest in the oil industry. Together with Max Whittier (1867–1928), he established the Green & Whittier Oil Company and drilled oil in the Los Angeles area. Shortly after, they started drilling near Bakersfield, California. In 1905, the Green & Whittier Oil Company merged with two other oil companies to become the Associated Oil Company of California. As a result, he served on the board of directors of the Associated Oil Company, later serving as its president. He served as the President of the Bellridge Oil Company, which encompassed 32,000 acres of the Lost Hills Oil Field in Kern County, California.

In 1900, together with Max Whittier, Charles A. Canfield (1848–1913), Frank H. Buck (1887–1942), Henry E. Huntington (1850–1927), William G. Kerckhoff (1856–1929), William F. Herrin (1854-1927), W.S. Porter and Frank H. Balch, known as the Amalgamated Oil Company, he purchased Rancho Rodeo de las Aguas from Henry Hammel and Andrew H. Denker and renamed it Morocco Junction. After drilling for oil and only finding water, they reorganized their business into the Rodeo Land and Water Company to develop a new residential town later known as Beverly Hills, California. Green served as the President of the Rodeo Land and Water Company. He called the new town Beverly Hills after his fond recollections of time spent in Beverly Farms, Massachusetts. He hired architects Wilbur David Cook and Myron Hunt to design the master plans of the city.

Green was a large investor in the Booth-Kelly Lumber Company. The company spanned 200,000 acres of timber land in Oregon and owned many wind mills in Oregon. It also founded several towns in Oregon.

== Personal life ==
Green was married to Lillian Wellborn (1875-1957), the daughter of Judge Olin Wellborn (1848-1921). They had three daughters: Dorothy (Dolly), Liliore, and Burton, who was named after her father. Their daughter Dolly was a philanthropist and horsebreeder. The Liliore Green Rains Houses, one of the largest housing complexes on the campus of Stanford University, is named for their second daughter.

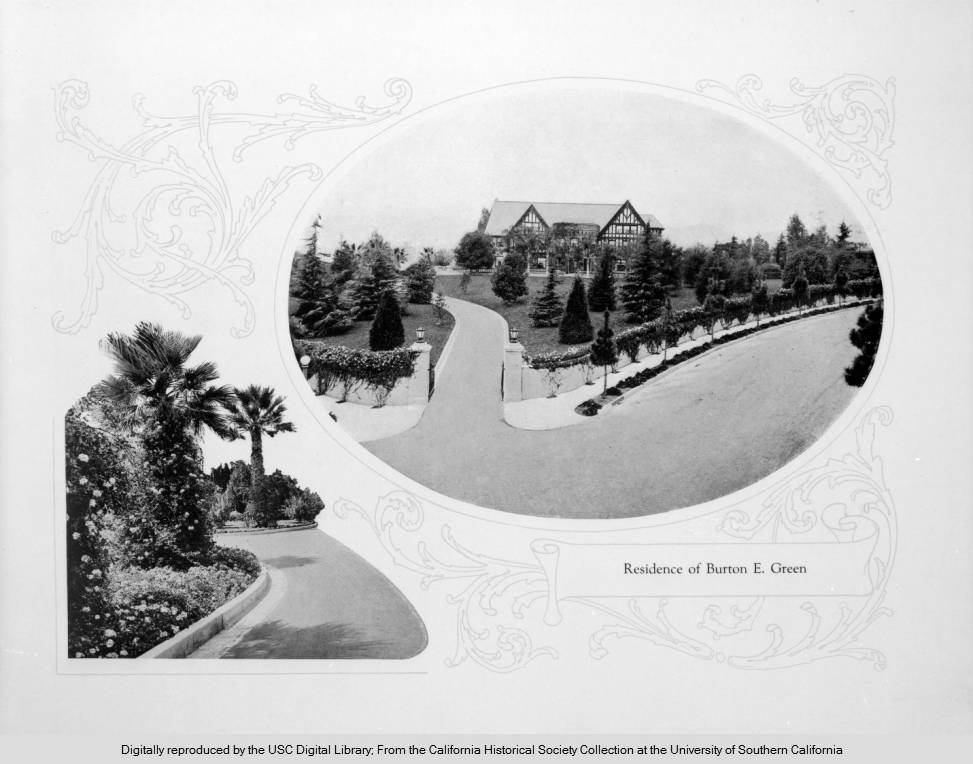
Burton E. Green's residence in Beverly Hills, California

They resided in a Tudor Revival mansion at 1601 Lexington Road, North of the Beverly Hills Hotel, in Beverly Hills. It was built in 1913–1914. The Green family owned the house until the 1960s. The house still stands, although it has been remodeled several times.

Green was a member of the California Club, the Jonathan Club and Crags Country Club (ceased operations in 1936 and the lodge was torn down in 1955) in Los Angeles, as well as the Pacific-Union Club and the Bohemian Club in San Francisco, California. Additionally, he enjoyed "hunting, fishing, golf[ing] and motoring" at the Los Angeles Country Club, the San Francisco Country Club, the Bolsa Chica Gun Club, the Flat Rock Club in Idaho, and the San Ysidro Rancho Co. in Mexico.

== Death ==
Green died on May 13, 1965, in Los Angeles County, California.

== Legacy ==
- The thoroughfare Burton Way in Beverly Hills is named in his honor, as is Greenway Drive.
- The CII Burton E. Green Campus of the Children's Institute Inc. in Torrance, California, is named in his honor.
- The Burton E. Green Professor of Pediatric Neuropathology at Children's Hospital Los Angeles is named in his honor. It has been held by Floyd H. Gilles since 1982.
- The Burton E. Green Public Policy and Leadership Award is granted to a Beverly Hills High School Student each year.
