= Mohammed al Fassi =

- Born: 1952; Saudi Arabia
- Died: December 24, 2002 (aged 50); Cairo, Egypt

Mohammed al Fassi (Arabic: محمد الفاسي; 1952 – Dec. 24, 2002), at times referred to as Prince al Fassi, was a Moroccan/Saudi businessman related by marriage to the Saudi royal family. His sister was married to Prince Turki bin Abdul Aziz, one of the brothers of Saudi King Fahd al Saud.

Al Fassi's notoriety stems largely from his 1978 purchase for $2.4 million of the 38-room white-stucco Whittier Mansion on Sunset Boulevard, Beverly Hills, which he had painted an unpopular shade of green. He also had painted the publicly visible statues around the house in flesh tones, with pubic hair painted black, raising the ire of many of his neighbors. In 1979 the mansion was used as a filming location for The Jerk starring Steve Martin. Within two years of its purchase, just after midnight on January 2, 1981, the house was completely destroyed by a fire which was set by burglars. In 2010, the house was replaced by two new buildings.

Al Fassi soon relocated to Miami, joining other members of the Saudi royal family already there, and already provoking notoriety with helicopter commuting and large and unusual charitable contributions. Among his exploits there were disputes over fencing he erected on city property, the hiring of city police officers to serve as security guards, a lawsuit from a contractor for unpaid bills, and a dust-up over a proposed Big Ben-style clock to be built on Star Island in Biscayne Bay.

Al Fassi had mixed success as an animal lover; he was known to have adopted scores of stray cats, and to have purchased live birds, fish, and even lobsters in order to set them free, but he was also charged with animal cruelty when investigators from the Greater Miami Humane Society found evidence of neglect.

In 1991 Al Fassi was arrested in Jordan and hastily extradited to Saudi Arabia, where he was held without charges until his release to house arrest. His arrest stemmed from his having taken the side of Iraq in the Persian Gulf War. He made broadcasts from Baghdad denouncing Saudi Arabia for its participation in the war, for its human rights policies, and calling for democracy.

Al Fassi died Dec. 24, 2002 in Cairo. According to Marvin Mitchelson, the divorce lawyer for his first wife, Sheika Dena al Fassi, he died of an infected hernia, and was survived by four grown children.
