= Rancho Rodeo de las Aguas =

Mexican land grant in California

Coordinates: 34.070°N 118.390°W

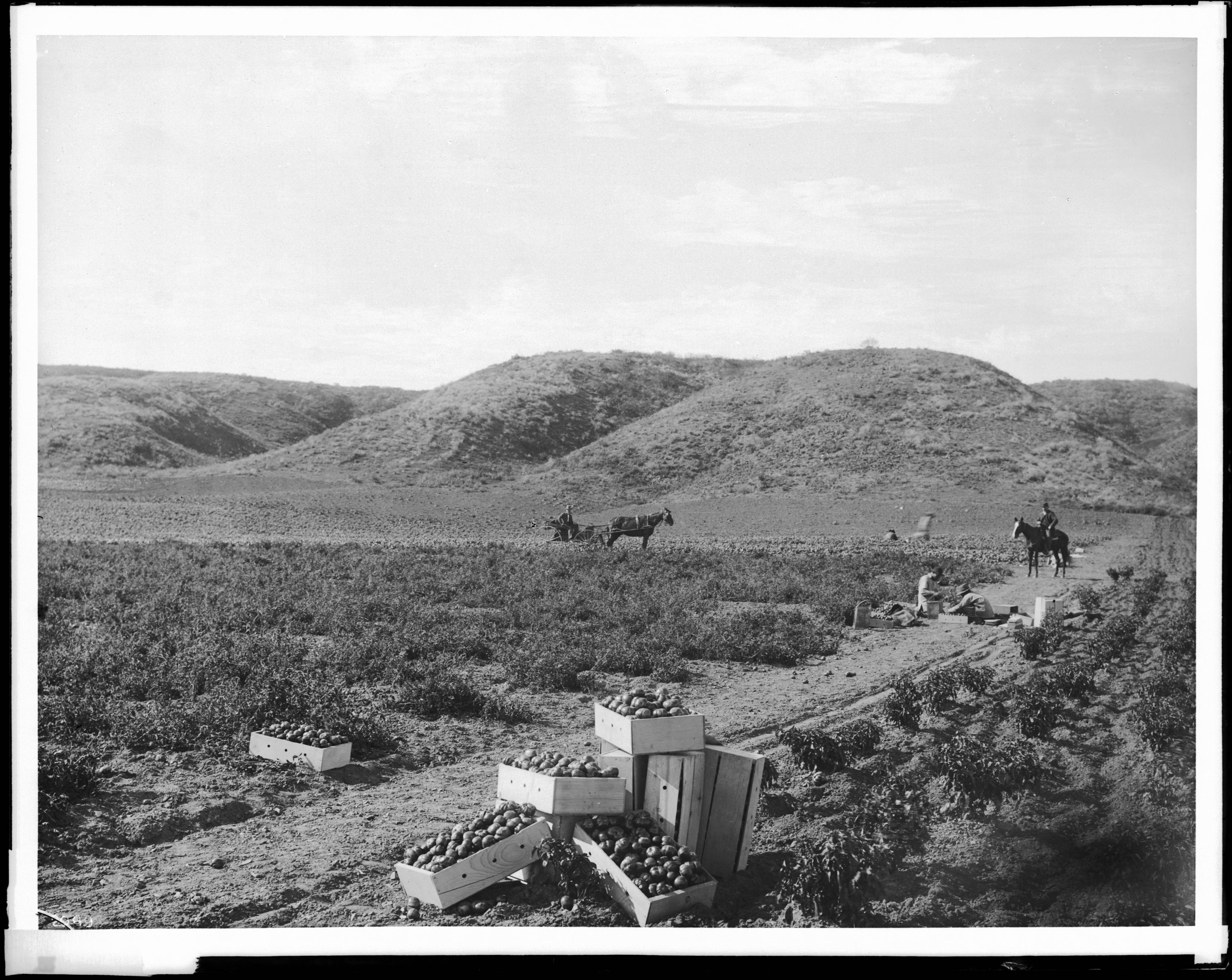
Group of people picking tomatoes, Hammel and Denker ranch, c. 1903

Rancho Rodeo de las Aguas was a 4,539-acre (18.37 km^{2}) land grant in present day Beverly Hills in Los Angeles County, California, given to María Rita Quinteros Valdez de Villa in 1838.

Rancho Rodeo de las Aguas (Ranch of the Gathering Waters), is named for the streams that emptied into the area from out of the canyons of the Santa Monica Mountains above it, the Cañada de las Aguas Frias (Glen of the Cold Waters, now Coldwater Canyon) and Cañada de los Encinos (Glen of the Green Oaks, now Benedict Canyon).

== History ==
Maria Rita Valdez was a granddaughter of Luis Quintero, one of the original settlers of Los Angeles. Maria was married to Spanish colonial soldier, Vicente Fernando Villa (–1841).

With the cession of California to the United States following the Mexican–American War, the 1848 Treaty of Guadalupe Hidalgo provided that the land grants would be honored. As required by the Land Act of 1851, a claim for Rancho Rodeo de las Aguas was filed with the Public Land Commission in 1852, and the grant was patented to Maria Rita Valdez at 4,449 acres (18 km^{2}) in 1871.

The rancho was sold in 1854 to Benjamin D. Wilson and Major Henry Hancock. Hancock later sold his share to William Workman. In 1868 Edward Preuss, purchased over 3,600 acres (15 km^{2}) for the development of a city to be known as the "Town of Santa Maria". Lots were platted of about five acres each, but dry weather came and the land reverted to the sheep.

The land next passed into the hands of Henry Hammel and Andrew H. Denker, owners of the United States Hotel at Main and Market Streets in Los Angeles, and became "one vast field of lima beans", supplying the culinary needs of the owners' Hotel. The bean fields survived until 1900 when the land was sold to Burton E. Green of the Amalgamated Oil Company for oil development. After drilling many unproductive wells, they reorganized as the Rodeo Land and Water Company in 1906 and began developing the land. Much of the former Rancho became the city of Beverly Hills.

== See also ==
- Ranchos of Los Angeles County
- Rodeo Drive
- Ballona Creek
