= Kerckhoff Building and Annex =

Historic building in Los Angeles, California

- U.S. National Register of Historic Places
- Los Angeles Historic-Cultural Monument
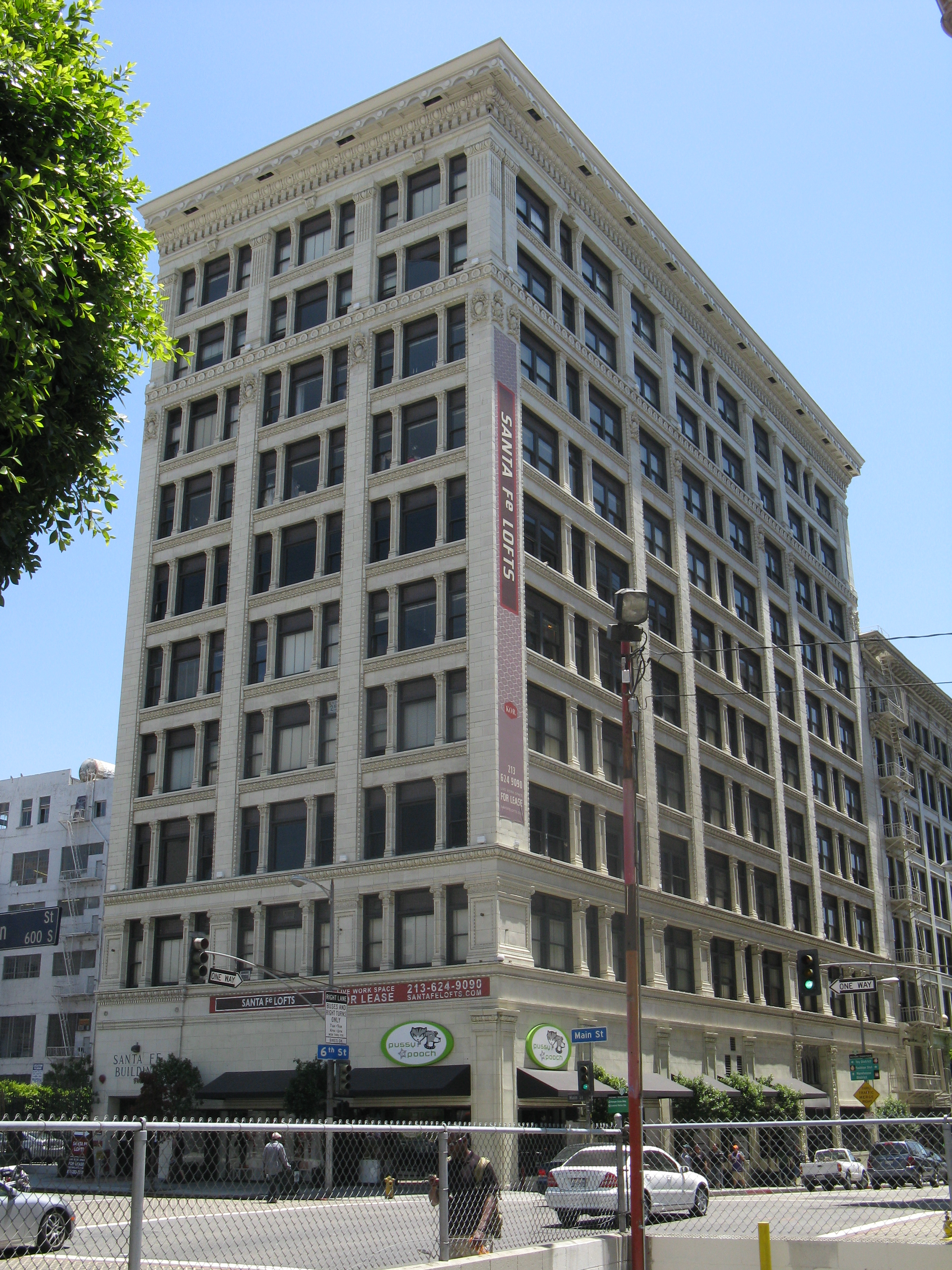

- Location within the Los Angeles metropolitan area Location within California Location within the United States
- Location: 558-64 S. Main St., Los Angeles, California
- Coordinates: 34°01′05″N 118°14′52″W
- Area: less than one acre
- Built: 1907
- Architect: Morgan, Walls and Morgan
- Architectural style: Beaux Arts
- NRHP reference No.: 05000774
- LAHCM No.: 807

Significant dates
- Added to NRHP: August 3, 2005
- Designated LAHCM: June 1, 2005

The Kerckhoff Building and Annex (also known as the Kerckoff Building or Santa Fe Building; later known as the Santa Fe Lofts) is a historic commercial building complex on Sixth Street between Main and Los Angeles streets in Downtown Los Angeles, California, United States. Designed by Morgan, Walls and Morgan, the complex consists of two adjoining Beaux-Arts style office buildings constructed in 1907–1908 and in 1916. The buildings were originally developed by businessman William G. Kerckhoff and, for much of the 20th century, contained offices for the Santa Fe Railroad. The complex, later converted into residential lofts, was listed on the National Register of Historic Places in 2005. It is also designated as a Los Angeles Historic-Cultural Monument.

== Description ==
The Kerckhoff Building and the adjoining Kerckhoff Annex are located on Sixth Street, between Main and Los Angeles streets, in Downtown Los Angeles, California, United States. The original Kerckhoff Building occupies the northeast corner of Main and Sixth streets and is ten stories high. The Kerckhoff Annex occupies the northwest corner of Los Angeles and Sixth streets, just east of the original structure. It is eight stories high. Both structures were designed by Morgan, Walls and Morgan. The complex is designed in the Beaux-Arts style and is located farther east than most of downtown's other Beaux-Arts buildings, which are generally concentrated in the Broadway and Spring Street historic districts.

The original building has a reinforced concrete frame clad in white architectural terracotta. The southern elevation on Sixth Street is divided vertically into five bays of alternating wide and narrow windows, while the western elevation on Main Street is divided into three bays. The principal elevations are organized horizontally into three sections: a two-story base, six-story shaft, and two-story capital. The base has a main entrance on Main Street and storefronts along the rest of the first story, along with piers and pilasters supporting an entablature above the second story. The shaft has classical pilasters, decorative spandrels, ornamental moldings, and a frieze above the eighth floor. The capital has fluted piers, spandrels, dentils, and a projecting cornice. The base has been altered over time, but much of the upper exterior decorations remain intact.

The annex has a facade of glazed brick and terracotta, and also has a reinforced concrete frame. The southern elevation on Sixth Street has nine bays, while the eastern elevation on Los Angeles Street has seven bays. The facade is likewise divided into three horizontal sections: a two-story base, five-story shaft, and one-story capital. At the base, the ground floor has a primary entrance (with iron-framed wooden doors) to the south, and a now-shuttered secondary entrance to the east. The rest of the base contains of storefront windows on the first floor, as well as pairs of windows separated by paneled mullions on the second story. The shaft is mostly plain in design, with the exception of floral-shield motifs above the lintels; the capital has carved panels, a frieze, and a protruding cornice.

Originally, the original structure's interior had marble wainscoting and tile floors. There were 150 offices on the nine upper floors, connected by three elevators. The annex's interior had oak and marble finishes, a mailroom on the second floor, and a pneumatic tube mail system. The interiors were connected to each other at their respective floors. Most of the interior partitions were removed when the building was converted from office to residential use in the 2000s, though corridors, stairs, elevator landings, and lobbies remain intact. By the 2010s, the buildings had a combined 132 apartments.

== History ==
The original Kerckhoff Building was commissioned by the businessman William G. Kerckhoff, who worked in the lumber, utilities, banking, and real estate sectors. He acquired a site on the northeast corner of Main and Sixth Street and hired Morgan and Walls to design the original building by November 1906. This building measured about 60 by 150 feet (18 by 46 m) across and was originally supposed to rise seven stories, but by May 1907 had been changed to ten stories. By then, work was underway on part of the building, and the Santa Fe Railroad had rented six of the upper stories and was considering renting two more. The railroad had been motivated to relocate to the building because one of Kerckhoff's businesses supplied ice to Santa Fe train cars. The building was completed in 1908, and Santa Fe moved its offices into the third through tenth floors that May.

Morgan and Wells (by then renamed Morgan, Walls & Morgan) announced plans in 1913 to expand the building east to Los Angeles Street. This expansion was originally to rise eleven stories, with a roof at the same height as the original building, due to the downward slope of the site. A building permit was issued the next year; it was one of several ongoing development projects in downtown Los Angeles at the time. In 1915, Weymouth Crowell was hired to construct an annex to the building on Los Angeles Street. Work began that November, and the annex was finished in 1916. The lower stories were leased out to various tenants, and the upper stories were leased out to Santa Fe. In 1933, Santa Fe bought the two structures outright. Santa Fe continued to occupy the building until the 1980s.

The Kerckhoff Building and the Kerckhoff Annex were listed on the National Register of Historic Places on August 3, 2005, as a single property. The National Register report stated that the building and its annex were one of three Los Angeles sites associated with the Santa Fe Railroad, aside from the Inbound Freight Depot and the Santa Fe Coast Lines Hospital. During the 21st century, the building was known as Santa Fe Lofts, and a bar was added there in 2008. Capital Foresight bought the building in 2012 and refinanced it in 2014. A massive mural depicting cover art for Supermodel. an album by the band Foster the People, was painted on the side of the building in 2014; the mural was painted over that year because of landmark regulations requiring the building to maintain its historical appearance. The buildings were sold for $70 million in 2018 to MWest Holdings, which planned to spend $6 million renovating them.

== See also ==
- National Register of Historic Places listings in Los Angeles
- List of Los Angeles Historic-Cultural Monuments in Downtown Los Angeles
