= Los Angeles Pobladores =

Original 1781 settlers of Los Angeles

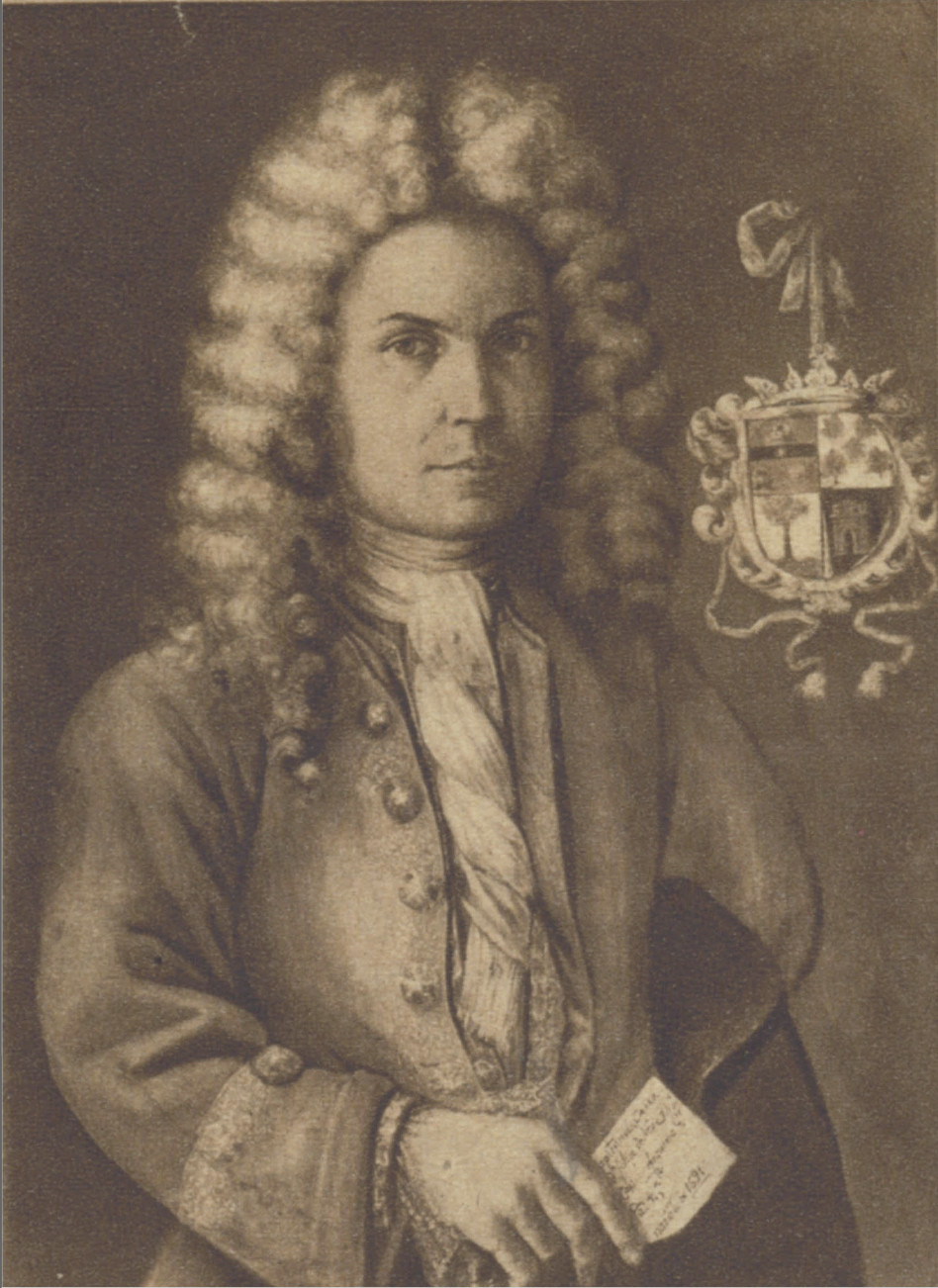
Felipe de Neve, founder of Los Angeles and 4th Governor of the Californias.

Los pobladores del pueblo de los Ángeles (English: The townspeople of Los Angeles) refers to the 44 original settlers and 4 soldiers from New Spain (Spanish Mexico) who founded the Pueblo de Nuestra Señora la Reina de los Ángeles in 1781, which is now the present-day city of Los Angeles, California.

When the Governor of Las Californias, Felipe de Neve, was assigned to establish secular settlements in what is now the state of California (after more than a decade of missionary work among the natives), he commissioned a complete set of maps and plans (the Reglamento para el gobierno de la Provincia de Californias and the Instrucción) to be drawn up for the design and colonization of the new pueblo. Finding the individuals to actually do the work of building and living in the city proved to be a more daunting task. Neve finally located the new and willing dwellers in Sonora and Sinaloa, Mexico. But gathering the pobladores was a little more difficult. The original party of the new townsfolk consisted of eleven families, that is 11 men, 11 women, and 22 children of various Spanish castas (castes).

The castas of the 22 adult pobladores, according to the 1781 census, were:

- 1 Criollo (Spaniard born in New Spain)
- 9 Indios (Indigenous people from New Spain)
- 1 Mestizo (mixed Spanish and Indian)
- 8 Mulattos (mixed Spanish and black)
- 2 Negros (blacks of full African ancestry)
- 1 Peninsular (Spaniard born in Spain)

== Rediscovery of the Pobladores ==
William M. Mason, historian of Los Angeles and early California, uncovered the ethnic richness of the Pueblo de la Reina de los Angeles through extensive research. Mason, one of three founders of the Los Angeles Historical Society, authored six books and several articles regarding the early history and cultures around Southern California and he is credited with helping to uncover the ethnic facts about the original families of Los Angeles.

The official foundation date of Los Angeles is September 4, 1781, when tradition has it the forty-four pobladores gathered at San Gabriel Mission along with two priests from the Mission and set out with an escort of four soldiers for the site that Father Juan Crespí had chosen over a decade earlier. El Pueblo de Nuestra Señora la Reina de los Ángeles, (Spanish for The Town of Our Lady the Queen of the Angels) is the original, official long version of the name of the town founded by the Pobladores.

The earliest Hispanic settlers of all of California, not just Los Angeles, were almost exclusively from New Spain, precisely, from the current Mexican states of Sinaloa and Sonora. The author and historian, Dr. Antonio Ríos-Bustamante, has written that "the original settlers of Los Angeles were racially mixed persons of Indian, Spanish, and African descent. This mixed racial composition was typical of both the settlers of Alta California and of the majority of the population of the northwest coast provinces of Mexico from which they were recruited." Dr. Ríos-Bustamante relates that in the century preceding the founding expedition of 1781, many Indians in this region of Mexico had been "culturally assimilated and ethnically intermixed into the Spanish-speaking, mestizo society." Other settlers from Mexico, Central and South America, Asia, Europe, and the United States would follow in the decades to come.

== Opportunity and social mobility in a frontier society ==
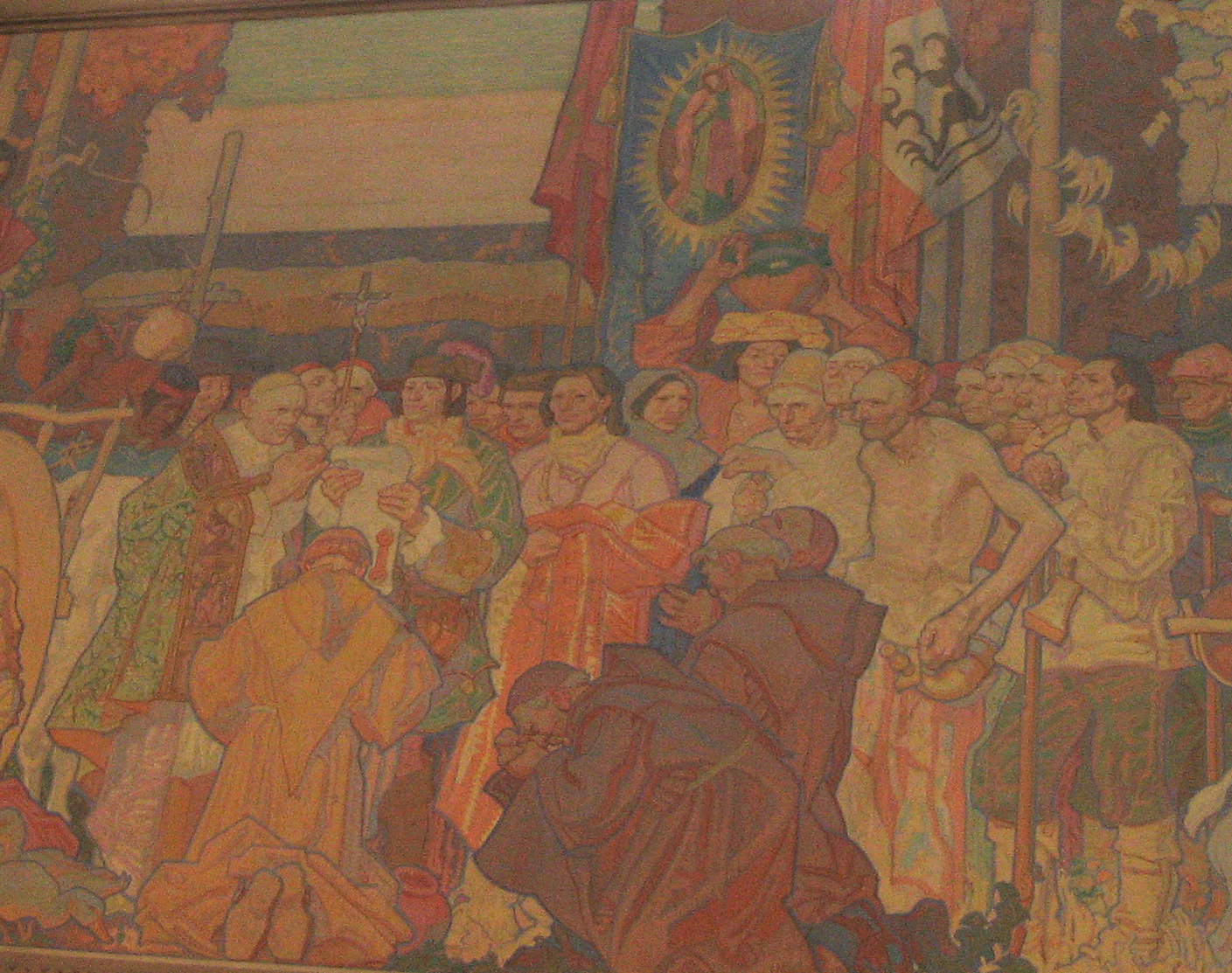
The Founding of Los Angeles mural at the Los Angeles Central Library; Dean Cornwell, 1933.

=== Racial origins changed over time ===
Of the 44 original pobladores [colonists] who founded Los Angeles, only two were white, […] Of the other 42, 26 had some degree of African ancestry and 16 were Indians or mestizos [people of mixed Spanish and Indian blood]. — William M. Mason, 1975

Alta California, as the province was known then, marked the northern frontier of the Spanish empire in the New World. The story of California's African heritage began in 1781, when the forty-four settlers founded El Pueblo de Nuestra Señora la Reina de los Ángeles, and more than half of these original pobladores—Antonio Mesa, Manuel Camero, Luis Quintero, José Moreno, their wives, and the wives of José Antonio Navarro and Basilio Rosas—had African ancestors, as was typical in the northern provinces of New Spain. The descendants of these early settlers eventually developed their own culture and sense of place and became the Californios. Some became owners of large landed estates, granted to them by the Crown, others became government leaders.

Some historians and people in general have emphasized a difference between "Spaniard" and a "Mexican" in terms of race. For example, "colonial Mexicans" are "persons of mixed blood." As Magnus Mörner has observed, the seven centuries prior to the discovery of the New World in Spain "witnessed extraordinary acculturation and race mixture." Furthermore, at one time in the history of Mexico there were more African slaves held in Mexico than in the colonial United States north of the border. Moreover, "Mestizos" born in wedlock, at least during the sixteenth century, were accepted as "Criollos", that is, as 'American Spaniards'." In short, the definition of "Mexican" often confuses race with nationality in the modern period and with caste in the colonial period. In addition, by this definition of "Mexican," neither an Indian, nor a Criollo, nor a Black would be Mexican because they are, by social definition at least, of "unmixed blood."

Like the original settlers of other parts of California and the American Southwest in general, the Pobladores reflected varied backgrounds: Peninsular (born in Spain), Criollo (born in the Americas of Spanish ancestry), Indian, Black, Mestizo (of mixed Spanish and Indian ancestry), Mulatto (of Spanish and African ancestry), and Zambo (of mixed Indian and African ancestry), among other combinations. Most of the colonists were of mixed racial backgrounds, and the process of mestizaje (racial mixing) continued in California, to include mixing with the various California Indian societies. Many Mestizos and Mulattos strove, sometimes successfully, to become identified as pure-blooded Spaniards, and many Indians and Black became Mestizos and Mulattos, because racial identity affected and reflected socio-economic mobility. At least seven of the 22 original, adult settlers managed to do this in the 1790 census of Los Angeles. In general, this meant that the descendants of the original settlers came to identify themselves as either Mestizo, or among the more socially prominent, as Spaniards.

=== From settlers to civic leaders, alcaldes and governors ===
The descendants of the settlers and soldiers naturally played a prominent role in developing the Los Angeles area. As colonial soldiers retired, the government granted them vast "ranchos" as partial or full payment, or in gratitude, for their services. Other settlers also acquired ranches. Compared to the size of the pueblo, these land grants were massive in size and rivaled the land holdings of the missions. They were instrumental in developing a local economy based on cattle ranching and their owners, later referred to as "rancho dons," became the predominant figures in Southern California's society. Among those exercising considerable political and economic power were Andrés Pico, and Alcaldes Francisco Reyes and Tiburcio Tapia. Pío Pico, the last governor of California under Mexican rule and the builder of the Pico House, was a large landowner and businessman. Grandchildren of Luis Quintero included Eugene Biscailuz, who served as sheriff of Los Angeles, and María Rita Valdes Villa, whose 1838 land grant is now Beverly Hills. Throughout the nineteenth century, the "rancho dons" and their families would intermarry with each other and with immigrant, Anglo-American merchants from New England, who arrived to trade in hides, creating strong family alliances.

== Contemporary commemoration ==
=== Historic Walk of Los Pobladores ===
"Los Pobladores Historic Walk to Los Angeles" occurs each year over the Labor Day Weekend, which coincides with the September 4 anniversary of the city's founding. It is organized by the Los Pobladores 200, an association of the descendants of the original forty-four settlers and soldiers that accompanied them. The cities of San Gabriel and Los Angeles join to celebrate Los Pobladores' last nine-mile trek to the city center. Claremont columnist and administrator T. Willard Hunter and the descendants of the original founders of the city began the tradition of the walk in 1981.

=== Olvera Street Monument ===
The original plaque at the El Pueblo de Los Ángeles Historical Monument commemorating Los Pobladores, installed in the 1950s, mentioned their ethnicities but was quickly removed under suspicious circumstances. A second plaque installed in the 1970s omitted any reference to the African heritage of many of its members. Eventually, scholars from the Los Angeles area, including professors from the University of Southern California and California State University at Dominguez Hills, were part of a subcommittee formed during a citywide effort to commemorate the Los Angeles' 200th anniversary and they helped to erect the current plaque in 1981, which accurately depicts the multiracial makeup of the founders. The City Council refused to fund it, after which librarian and researcher Miriam Matthews paid for it out of her own pocket.

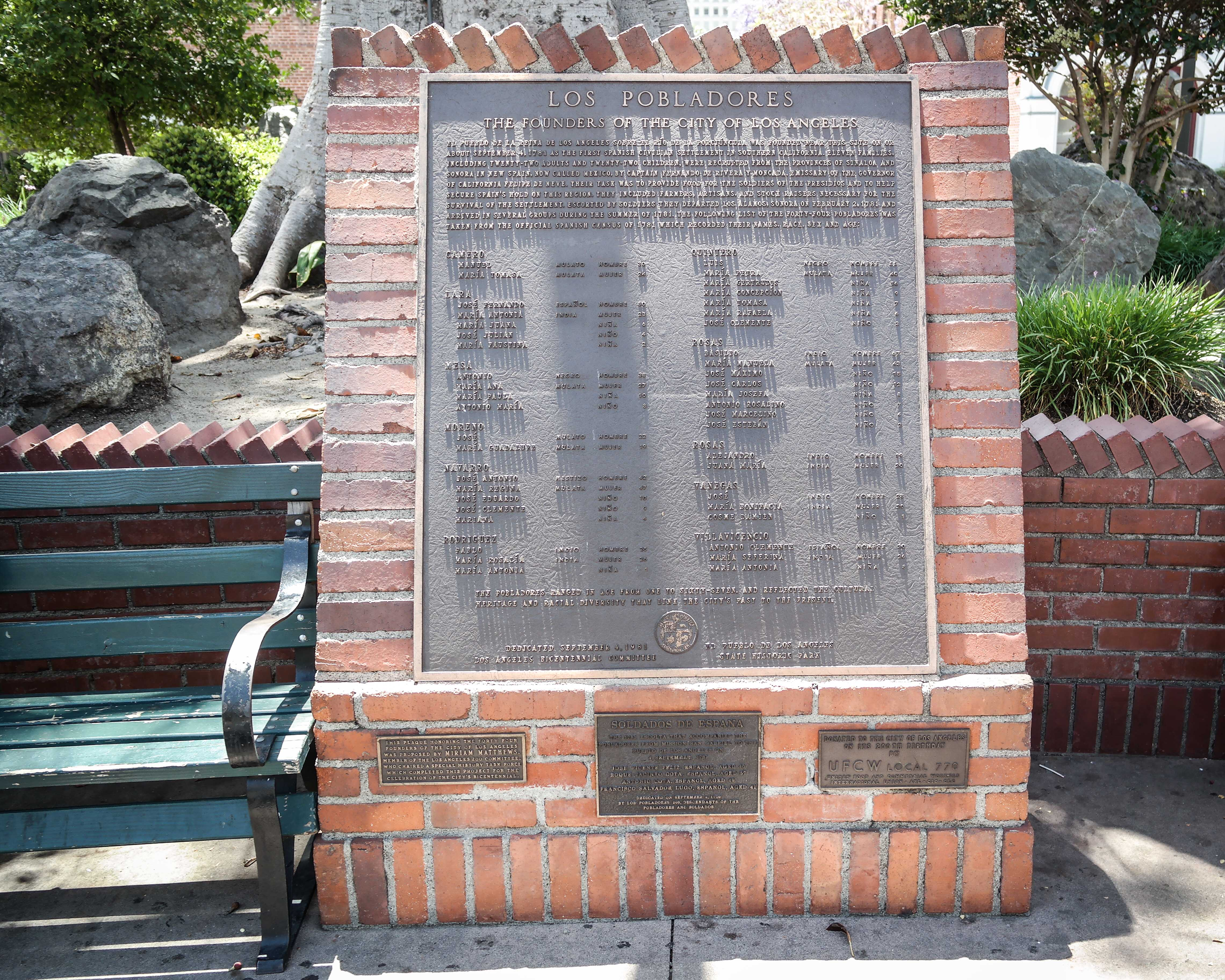
Los Pobladores plaque

Telling the history of the original families, known as Los Pobladores (the settlers), turned out to be "a political hot potato," according to Doyce Nunis, the USC professor of history who asked his former student Hata to chair the subcommittee.

"The descendants of Los Pobladores were very sensitive to the prospect of being revealed as having African roots," Nunis says. "But history is history, you can't change it. And the subcommittee found the evidence."

Also serving with Hata on the subcommittee was Miriam Matthews, the first African American to earn a degree in library science at USC, and who went on to have an illustrious career as a librarian and archivist of African American history in Los Angeles. The group also included David Almada, a Los Angeles Unified School District administrator serving at a time when few Latinos served in such positions, and Leonard Pitt, an emeritus professor of history at California State University, Northridge and author of Decline of the Californios: A Social History of the Spanish-Speaking Californians, 1846–1890. […]

The multiracial ethnicity of Los Pobladores had been rejected as rumors by the scholarly establishment, according to Hata, and never accepted until explicit census information was found in an archive in Seville. Documents confirmed that 11 families recruited by Felipe de Neve, the first Spanish governor of California, arrived from the Mexican provinces of Sinaloa and Sonora.

Four plaques were stolen in 2023.

=== Grand Marian Procession and Mass ===
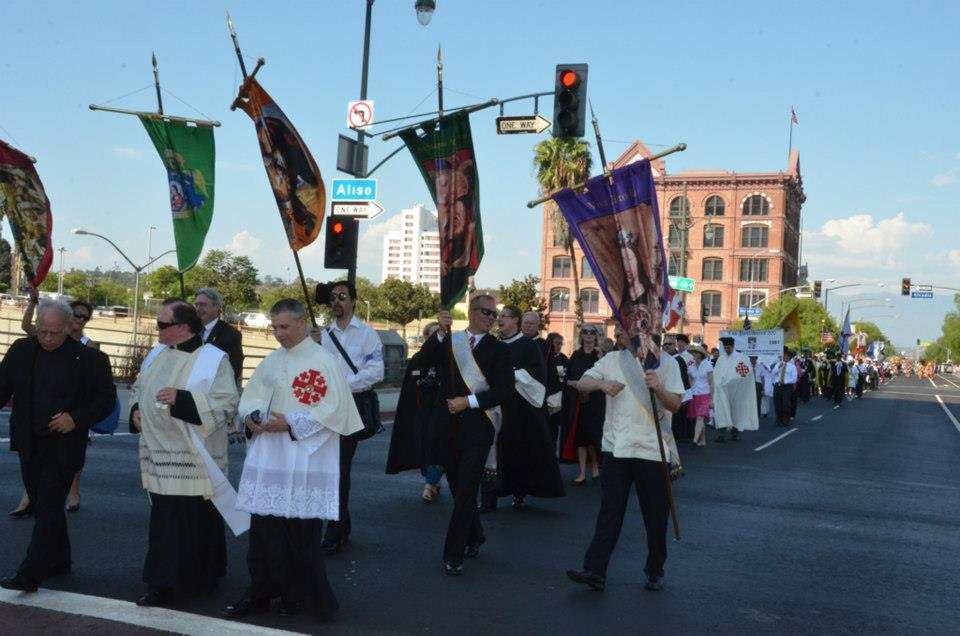
2012 Grand Marian Procession through Downtown Los Angeles

Since 2011 the once common but ultimately lapsed custom of conducting a procession and mass in honor of Nuestra Señora de los Ángeles in commemoration of the founding of the City of Los Angeles in 1781 was revived by the Queen of Angels Foundation, with the support and approbation of the Archdiocese of Los Angeles as well as several civic leaders. The purpose of the procession and Mass is to invoke Our Lady of the Angels, namesake and patroness of the Archdiocese, City, and County of Los Angeles. The recently revived custom is a continuation of the original processions and Masses which commenced on the first anniversary of the founding of Los Angeles in 1782 and continued for nearly a century thereafter.

== Founding Families of El Pueblo de la Reina de los Ángeles ==
From the original, November 19, 1781 Padrón of the Pueblo

No.	Settler Head of Household	Age	Casta	Birthplace	Wife and children
1	Manuel Camero	30	Mulatto	Nayarit	María Tomasa García, 24, Mulata
2	Antonio Mesa	38	Black	Sinaloa	María Ana Gertrudis López, 27, Mulata; María Paula, girl, 10; Antonio María, boy, 8
3	José Cesario Moreno	22	Mulatto	Sinaloa	María Guadalupe Gertrudis Pérez, 19, Mulata
4	José Antonio Navarro	42	Mestizo	Sinaloa	María Regina Dorotea Glorea de Soto, 47, Mulata; José Eduardo, boy, 10; José Clemente, boy, 9 Mariana, girl, 4
5	Luis Manuel Quintero	55	Black	Jalisco	María Petra Rubio, 40, Mulata; María Gertrudis, 16; María Concepcíon, girl, 9 María Tomasa, girl, 7 María Rafaela, girl, 6 José Clemente, boy, 3
6	Pablo Rodríguez	25	Indian	Sinaloa	María Rosalia Noriega, 26, Indian, María Antonia, girl, 1
7	José Alejandro Rojas (son of José Antonio Basilio Rosas)	19	Indian	Sinaloa	Juana María Rodríguez, 20, Indian
8	José Antonio Basilio Rosas	67	Indian	Durango	María Manuela Calixtra Hernández, 43, Mulata; José Máximo, boy, 15; José Carlos, boy, 12; María Josefa, girl, 8 Antonio Rosalino, boy, 7 José Marcelino, boy, 4 José Esteban, boy, 2
9	Jose María Vanegas	28	Indian	Jalisco	María Bonifacia Máxima Aguilar, 20, Indian; Cosme Damien, boy, 1
10	José Fernando de Velasco y Lara	50	Spaniard	Cádiz	María Antonia Campos, 23, Indian; María Juan, girl, 6 José Julian, boy, 4 María Faustina, girl, 2
11	Antonio Clemente Félix Villavicencio	30	Spaniard	Chihuahua	María de los Santos Flores Serafina, 26, Indian; María Antonia, girl, 8

=== Escoltas ===
The four soldiers (escoltas), accompanied by their families, who escorted the Pobladores to El Pueblo de Los Angeles.

1. Corporal José Vicente Feliz, born about 1741, at Álamos, New Navarre, New Spain, where he married Maria Ygnacia Manuela Pinuelas in 1758, and where their six children were born. He came to Alta California with the Anza Expedition in 1775. On the way to California near El Presidio Real de San Ignacio de Túbac, Intendancy of Arizpe, New Spain, on the Anza Trail, their son, Jose Antonio was born, but his wife, Maria Ygnacia died in childbirth. She was buried in November 1775 at La Misión San Xavier del Bac, Intendancy of Arizpe, Mexico. The child, Jose Antonio arrived safely along with his brothers and sisters with the Expedition at the San Gabriel Mission on January 4, 1776, but he died nine months later. Another son, Jose de Jesus Feliz, born about 1764, at Álamos, New Navarre, married Maria Celia Bonifacia de Cota (daughter of Roque Jacinto de Cota and Juana Maria Verdugo), born about 1759, at the Royal Presidio of Loreto, Baja California.

2. Private Roque Jacinto de Cota, born about 1724, at El Fuerte del Marqués de Montesclaros, New Navarre, New Spain, the eldest son of Andres de Cota and Angela de Leon. He married Juana Maria Verdugo, born about 1740, at the Loreto Mission a small fishing port in Baja, Ca. He died on September 29, 1798, in San Fernando, Alta California, she died May 13, 1835, in Los Angeles, California. Roque Jacinto de Cota served as an escort for the Pobladores from the San Gabriel Mission to El Pueblo de La Reina de los Angeles on September 4, 1781. He is the founder of the older Cota family in Alta California.

3. Private Antonio de Cota, brother of Roque and Pablo Antonio Cota. Antonio married Maria Bernarda Chigila (Indian) on August 30, 1778, at Mission San Juan Capistrano. They had two children: Maria Antonia Marcela, born June 1, 1780, Mission San Juan Capistrano, and Matilde. In the 1790 census they are shown as residing in the Presidio of San Diego and later as residents of Los Angeles. Antonio died on June 12, 1815, and was buried at Mission San Gabriel. Maria Bernarda died August 23, 1821, and was buried in the Plaza church.

4. Private Francisco Salvador de Lugo, born about 1740, at San Felipe y Santiago de Sinaloa, New Navarre, New Spain. He married Juana Maria Rita Martinez, born about 1745, at San Felipe y Santiago de Sinaloa. She was the daughter of Jose Maria Martínez and Maria Josefa Vianazul. He died on May 16, 1805, in Santa Barbara, she died on March 23, 1790, in Santa Barbara. His daughter, Rosa Maria de Lugo, born about 1760, at San Felipe y Santiago de Sinaloa, married Pablo Antonio de Cota on November 30, 1776, at the Mission San Luis Obispo, Alta California. He was recruited by Captain Rivera in 1774 and arrived at the San Gabriel Mission in 1775. He was stationed in San Luis Obispo and the Royal Presidio of Santa Barbara until 1781, when he served as an escort from the San Gabriel Mission to El Pueblo de Los Angeles on September 4, 1781.

== The Los Angeles Census of 1790 ==
Carried out as part of the Revillagigedo Census of 1793

No.	Head of Household	Occupation or Civil Status	Casta	Birthplace	Age	Family
1	María Ignacia Alvarado	Widow	Spaniard	Loreto	28	Four children, Spaniards: José María Osuna, 12; Francisca Osuna, 7; Juan María Osuna, 6; Juan Nepomuceno Osuna, 3.
2	Juan Álvarez	Cowboy	Coyote	Yaqui River	49	Wife Bernarda Silvas, Spaniard, (Villa Sinaloa) 17. One child from his first wife, Mestiza, Gertrudis, 3. One child from his present wife, Mestiza, María Rufina, two months.
3	Manuel Ramírez de Arellano	Weaver	Spaniard	Puebla	46	Wife María Agreda López de Haro, Spaniard, (Álamos), 30. Four children, Spaniards: Teodoro, 7; Rosalía, 5; Martina, 3; Rafaela, seven months.
4	Joaquín de Armenta	Farm worker	Spaniard	Villa Sinaloa	55	Wife María Loreta de Vega, Coyota, (Culiacán), 40. One orphan child, Spaniard: María Manuela Lisalde, 12.
5	Domingo Aruz	Farm worker	Spaniard	Girona	43	Wife Gertrudis Quintero, Mulata, (Álamos), 26. Mestizo sons from his first marriage: José, 14; Domingo, 12. Son from his present wife: Martín, 7.
6	Manuel Camero	Farm worker	Mestizo	Chametla (Sinaloa)	38	Wife Tomasa García, Coyota, Rosario, (Sinaloa), 32.
7	María Ignacia Carrillo	Widow	Spaniard	Loreto	65	Her adult son, Leonardo Verdugo, Spaniard, farm worker, Loreto, 29; her grandson: José Antonio Góngora, Spaniard, 12.
8	Roque de Cota	Farm worker	Spaniard	El Fuerte	66	Wife Juana María Verdugo, Spaniard, (Loreto), 47. Four children, Spaniards: Guillermo, 22; Loreta, 18; María Ignacia, 11; Dolores, 7.
9	Juan José Domínguez	Cowboy	Spaniard	Villa Sinaloa	53	Single.
10	Manuel Figueroa	Cowboy	Spaniard	Villa Sinaloa	35	Single.
11	Felipe Santiago García	Muleteer	Spaniard	Villa Sinaloa	40	Wife Petra Alcántara de Lugo, Spaniard, (Villa Sinaloa), 34. Ten children, Spaniards: Juan José, 16; Carlos María, 14; José Julián, 11; María de Jesús, 9; Felipe Santiago, 8; María Antonia, 7; Pascual Antonio, 6; Gerónima Antonia, 4; José Antonio, 2; Pedro Antonio, 1.
12	Joaquín Higuera	Farm worker	Mestizo	Villa Sinaloa	35	Wife María Teresa Cota, Spaniard, (Loreto), 24. Two children, Spaniards: Juan José, 3; Ignacio, 2.
13	Juan José Lobo	Muleteer	Spaniard	Villa Sinaloa	47	Wife María Nicolasa Beltrán, Spaniard, (Horcasitas), 33. Seven children, Spaniards: María Rita, 14; María Antonia, 12; Pedro José, 9; Timoteo, 6; José Cecilio, 4; María Dionisia, 2; José Marcial, two months.
14	María Pascuala de Lugo	Widow	Mestiza	Villa Sinaloa	40	Three children surnamed Silvas, Spaniards: Gertrudis, 11; Teodoro, 10; Rafael, 6.
15	José Moreno	Farm worker	Mestizo	Rosario, (Sinaloa)	34	Wife María Guadalupe Pérez, Coyota, (Rosario, Sinaloa), 27. Four children, Mestizos: María Gertrudis, 7; María Marta, 5; Juan, 3; María Lorenza, one week old
16	José Antonio Navarro	Tailor and Widower (absent)	Spaniard	Rosario, (Sinaloa)	53	Three children, Mestizos: José María, 19; José Clemente, 18; María Mariana, 11.
17	José Ontiveros	Cobbler	Mestizo	Rosario, (Sinaloa)	43	Wife Ana María Carrasco, Mulata, (Rosario, Sinaloa), 36. One child: María Encarnación, Mulata, 7.
18	Santiago de la Cruz Pico	Cowboy	Mestizo	San Javier de Cabazán	60	Wife Jacinta de la Bastida, Mulata, (Tepic), 53. Two children, Mulattos: Xavier, 23; Patricio, 21.
19	Francisco Reyes	Farm worker	Mulatto	Zapotlán el Grande	43	Wife María del Carmen Domínguez, Mestiza, (Villa Sinaloa), 23. Three children, Mulattos; Antonio Faustín, 4; Juana Inocencia, 3; José Jacinto, 2.
20	Martín Reyes	Muleteer	Mestizo	Villa Sinaloa	58	Single.
21	María Simona Rodríguez	Widow	Mestiza	Cosalá	33	Three children, Mestizos: Francisca López, 7, José Antonio López, 3; José María López, 2.
22	Pablo Rodríguez	Farm worker	Coyote	Real de Santa Rosa	40	Wife María Rosalía Noriega, India, (Rosario), 33. Four children, Indias: María Antonia, 10; María de Jesús, 8; María Patricia, 4; María Margarita, 2.
23	Pedro José Romero	Farm worker	Coyote	Guadalajara	32	Wife María García, Spaniard, (Alta California), 13.
24	Basilio Rosas	Mason	Coyote	Nombre de Dios	72	Wife María Manuela (Hernández), Mulata, (Rosario, Sinaloa), 47. Six children, Mulattos: José Máximo (a widower), 23; Antonio Rosalino, 12; José Marcelino, 11; Juan Estevan, 10; Diana María, 7; Gil Antonio, 4; orphan grandchildren, Mulattos: José Antonio, 3; María de la Ascensión, 7.
25	Efigenio Ruiz	Cowboy	Spaniard	El Fuerte	43	Wife María Rosa López, Spaniard, (El Fuerte), 37. Five children, Spaniards: José Pedro, 16; Hilario, 10; María Dolores, 7; María Cirilda, 5; José María, 1.
26	José Sinova	Blacksmith	Spaniard	Mexico	40	Wife María Gertrudis Bojórquez, Mestiza, (Villa Sinaloa), 28. Four children, Spaniards: Josefa Dolores, 12; Casilda de la Cruz, 9; María Julia, 4; María Seferina, 1.
27	José Vanegas	Shoemaker	Mestizo	Real de Bolaños	47	Wife María Máxima Aguilar, India, (Rosario, Sinaloa), 28. One child, Coyote: Cosme Damien, 9.
28	Mariano Verdugo	Farm worker and Interim Alcalde	Spaniard	San Javier	44	Wife Gregoria Espinosa, Spaniard, (Villa Sinaloa) 28. Four children: (daughter from his first wife) María Concepción Verdugo, Spaniard, 12. (Three children from her first husband), Mestizos: José Salazar, 8; María Marta Salazar, 5; María Teodora Salazar, 2.
29	José Villa	Farm worker	Spaniard	Pitic	43	Wife María Paula Martínez, (Horcasitas), Mestiza, 30. Four children, Mestizos: Vicente Ferrer, 19; María Estéfana, 8; María Antonia, 6; José Francisco Antonio, 2.
30	Félix Antonio Villavicencio	Cowboy	Spaniard	Chihuahua	50	Wife María de los Santos, India, (Batopilas), 37.
31	Faustino José de la Cruz (Zúñiga)	Employee	Mulato	San Blas	18	Single

== See also ==
- Bibliography of Los Angeles
- Outline of the history of Los Angeles
- Bibliography of California history
- Pueblo de Los Angeles
- History of Los Angeles, California

== Sources ==
- "Founding Families of El Pueblo De La Reina De Los Angeles..." Los Pobladores 200
- Alarcón, Raúl. Los Californios:California's Spanish, Native American, and African Heritage. California Cultures Lesson Plan. Calisphere-University of California.
- Jensen, Marilyn. "Los Pobladores Celebrate Their 200-Year California Heritage." Whittier Daily News. (March 24, 1982) at A. Anthony Leon V: Descendant of a Los Angeles Settler.
- Mason, William M. Los Angeles Under the Spanish Flag: Spain's New World. Burbank: Southern California Genealogical Society, 2004. ISBN 0-9617773-3-8
- Metcalfe, Howard H. "Probable Location of the Original Pueblo de la Reina de los Ángeles on the River Porciúncula" 1998.
- Mitchell, John L. "Diversity Gave Birth to L.A." Los Angeles Times. (August 22, 2007), Sec. A-1.
- Nunis, Doyce B., Harry Kelsey, Theodore E Treutlein, and Thomas Workman Temple. The Founding Documents of Los Angeles: A Bilingual Edition. Los Angeles: Historical Society of Southern California; Pasadena: Zamorano Club of Los Angeles, 2004. ISBN 978-0-914421-31-3
- Pitti, José; Antonia Castaneda and Carlos Cortes (1988). "A History of Mexican Americans in California," in Five Views: An Ethnic Historic Site Survey for California. California Department of Parks and Recreation, Office of Historic Preservation.
- Rios-Bustamante, Antonio. Mexican Los Ángeles: A Narrative and Pictorial History. Nuestra Historia Series, Monograph No. 1. Encino, California: Floricanto Press, 1992. ISBN 978-0-917451-94-2
- Taylor, Beverly Mateer. "Black in L. A. – The Vital Link." Burbank: Southern California Genealogical Society, 2006.
- Vigil, Ralph H. "The Hispanic Heritage and the Borderlands". Journal of San Diego History. Vol. 19, No. 3 (Summer 1973).
