= Luis Manuel Quintero =

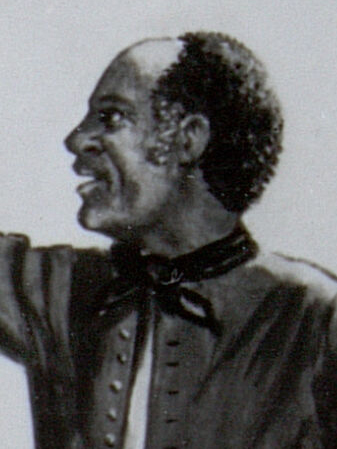
- Born: c. 1725; Guadalajara, Nueva Galicia, New Spain
- Died: 1810 (aged 85); Santa Barbara, Alta California, New Spain
- Occupations: Tailor, cattle rancher
- Known for: Los Angeles Pobladores
- Spouse: María Petra Rubio
- Children: María Juana Josefa Quintero; María Gertrudis Quintero; María Concepcíon Quintero; María Tomasa Quintero; María Rafaela Quintero; María Fabiana Sebastiana Quintero; Catharina Quintero; José Clemente Quintero

Luis Manuel Quintero (1725? – 1810) was an Afro-Spanish tailor from Guadalajara, Jalisco; who was one of the 44 original settlers of the Pueblo de Los Angeles (present-day Los Angeles, California) on September 4, 1781.

== Family ==
Quintero's wife María Petra Rubio was born near 1741 and came from Álamos, Sonora. A person of Spanish descent. They bore eight children, María Juana Josefa, María Gertrudis, María Concepcíon, María Tomasa, María Rafaela, María Fabiana Sebastiana, Catharina, and José Clemente.

On January 21, 1781, his 16-year-old daughter Catharina was married at Purísima Concepción Church in Álamos to one of Rivera's soldiers, Joaquin Rodríquez. His 15-year-old daughter, Fabiana Sebastiana, was married to another soldier of the expedition, Eugenio Valdés, on the same day. And, on the following day, Luis's eldest daughter, 18-year-old María Juana Josefa, was united in marriage with still another soldado de cuera, José Rosalino Fernández.

== Founding of Los Angeles ==
Luis Quintero and his wife María Petra Rubio, represent one of the eleven original couples to settle with their families at El Pueblo de Los Angeles in 1781. The Quintero family traveled from Sonora to Alta California to be one of the founding families of the new Spanish pueblo in 1781 being escorted along with other settlers and soldiers by Fernando Rivera y Moncada. When Captain Rivera assembled his crew of soldiers and settlers in Álamos in January 1781, Luis Quintero's destiny was already tied to the historic expedition about to take place.

The prospect of never seeing his daughters again may have played a role in Luis' decision to join the expedition, for it is believed that Luis Quintero was the last poblador to sign on the dotted line. When the settlers left Álamos on February 2, 1781, Luis, María Petra, and their eight children were among them.

== Life in California ==
Very little is known about Luis Quintero's activities in the first half year at the pueblo. But, on March 22 and 25, 1782, Luis served as padrino (godfather) for the Indians confirmed by Father Serra at the San Gabriel Mission. People have analyzed the causes of Luis Quintero's expulsion from Los Angeles in 1782 and concluded that the tailor Luis Quintero was probably not well suited for the rigors of frontier life. He was not a farmer and, at the age of 55, it was not likely that he could have adjusted effortlessly to the profession of farmer. Many secondary sources assert that on March 26, 1782, Luis and two other settlers were expelled from Los Angeles by order of Governor de Neve and "sent away as useless to the pueblo and themselves.” Their properties confiscated by the authorities, Luis and his family joined the Santa Barbara Company on their journey to the northwest. However, William Mason, noted California historian and long the curator of Southern California history at the Los Angeles County Museum of Natural History asserted

It might be well to add that the pobladores Lara and Quintero both were released from the pueblo of Los Angeles after they had made “repeated requests,” as Neve had put it. They were not thrown out of the pueblo, as implied by most secondary sources. Mesa, too, was included in the request at his own instigation.

Whether he left voluntarily or not, he choose to live out his life as a tailor in Santa Barbara. It is also to be noted the two families expelled were the only ones of African descent.

Three of Luis’ daughters had married soldiers who were attached to the Expedition of 1781. All three of these soldiers (José Rosalino Fernández, Joaquin Rodríguez, and Eugenio Valdés) were destined to be stationed at the Santa Barbara Presidio in the Spring of 1782. It is possible that the Quintero family hoped to be closer to those daughters. Luis Quintero lived out the remaining 28 years of his life as a member of the budding Santa Barbara community, serving as the maestro sastre (master tailor) for the soldiers at the presidio. Quintero died in 1810 in Santa Barbara, after serving as tailor for the soldiers at the presidio.
