= Max Whittier =

American businessman (1867–1925)

Mericos "Max" Whittier
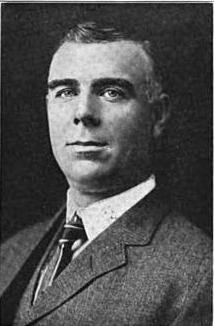
- Born: March 11, 1867; Caribou, Maine, U.S.
- Died: June 28, 1925 (aged 58)
- Occupation: Business
- Spouse: Johanna E. Williams
- Children: Donald, Leland, Paul, Helen
- Parent(s): C.G. Whittier, Ruth Keech
- Relatives: C.F. Whittier (brother)

Mericos "Max" Whittier (1867–1925) was a pioneer in the early California oil industry and was instrumental in the development of 3 of California's billion barrel oil fields: Kern River, Midway-Sunset, and South Belridge.

With his partner Burton Green and several others, Max Whittier developed the city of Beverly Hills.

== Early life ==
Mericos Hector Whittier was born on March 11, 1867, to Charles G. Whittier and Ruth Keech, potato farmers in rural Aroostook County, Maine. During the Civil War, Charles G. Whittier had served in the 20th Maine Infantry Regiment, and as a member of Company C had been wounded in the fighting at Little Round Top at the Battle of Gettysburg.

In the mid-19th century, the state of Maine was eager to encourage settlement of its northernmost county - Aroostook. State land in Aroostook county was made available for $1.25 an acre, fifty cents in cash and the rest to be paid out in labor as the settlers were required to build new roads. Charles and Ruth Whittier were early immigrants to Aroostook, and they built a simple, one room log cabin in which they raised their seven children.

Ruth Keech Whittier wrote about the economic challenges of life in Caribou, Maine in the 1860's, "Wages for a day's work at sewing were twenty-five cents to sew from 8am till bedtime, board included. Sewing machines were unknown at that time. I often took my pay then in something to put on the farm - a lamb, a heifer, geese, or hens. Money was a very scarce article in those days, especially after the Civil War was declared, less than a year after we came here. Twenty to thirty dollars a month were good wages for a man. Seventy-five cents to a dollar a week was a girl's wage. Buckwheat and cedar shingles were legal tender in those days."

== Career ==
In 1890, 23 years old and the owner of a new suit of clothes and $25 left for traveling expenses, Max Whittier took the railroad west to Santa Paula, California where he got a job as a farm hand in the area's lemon orchards. In 1891, Whittier secured a job as a roughneck with the newly formed Union Oil Company, and then in 1892 he partnered with Thomas A. O'Donnell and formed the Hardly Able Oil Company. Their one shallow well struck no oil, and as Whittier commented, left the two partners "badly bent".

=== Los Angeles Oil Field ===
When Edward Doheny's successful well caused a frenzy of activity at the Los Angeles Oil Field in 1892, O'Donnell & Whittier Drilling Contractors moved south and offered their wildcatting drilling services to property owners who hoped to strike it rich in their own backyards.

=== Kern River Oil Field ===
Removed from the congestion of the Los Angeles Oil Field, was a region to the north offering its own potential for oil, Kern County. In the spring of 1899, oil was discovered at a depth of 70 feet along the banks of the Kern River. Sensing the Kern River Oil Field's potential, Max Whittier traveled extensively over the area, setting up camps as he investigated potential oil lands. In partnership with Burton Green, Whittier decided to gamble his entire life savings of $13,000 and bought up parcels of land along the Kern River. It was a gamble that certainly paid off. The Green & Whittier leases at Kern River proved to be among the most productive oil lands yet found in California.

Describing the atmosphere of the Kern River strike, Whittier wrote "To those who have never experienced the excitement of an oil boom, it is hard to describe. Every room in every hotel and lodging house was taken and even tents were set up to take care of the overflow of people who came from all over the United States. Land sold for as high as $5,000 an acre, which 15 months prior was purchased for $2.50 per acre. Many people thought I was making a mistake for not cashing in on my holdings, but I felt that money so easily made would likely go as quickly. My better judgement was to hang on to the land, and in doing so I am satisfied I made no mistake."

By 1903 Kern River was the top producing oil field in the nation, and today is the 7th largest oil field in the continental United States.

=== Associated Oil Company ===
By 1901, the Green & Whittier properties were producing several thousand barrels of oil a day. Such success however, did not guarantee a profitable market for independent producers like Green & Whittier. As production soared in the Kern River Oil field, prices paid by purchasing companies like Standard Oil fell as quickly, dropping from $1.00 to $.12 a barrel.

In an attempt to maintain competitiveness, the owners of the five largest Kern River oil producers combined their holdings in 1901 and formed the Associated Oil Company. At its inception, Max Whittier was the largest shareholder of the new company , and Burton Green was elected to serve as its treasurer. By 1904 the Associated Oil Company was the largest crude oil producer in California, producing 4,000,000 barrels a year or 14% of total California output.

To control their own distribution and compete with the Standard Oil Company, in 1906 the Associated Oil Company purchased a pipeline from Kern County to the coast at Monterey, and in 1907 constructed a 282 mile pipeline from the Kern River Oil Field to Port Costa, a small town on the eastern San Francisco Bay. In 1910, Southern Pacific Railroads acquired a majority interest in the Associated Oil Company. In 1926, the Associated Oil Company and Tidewater Petroleum merged to become Tidewater Associated Oil Company.

=== Belridge Oil Company ===
Perhaps the most significant undertaking in Max Whittier’s career was the formation of the Belridge Oil Company in 1911. The Belridge Oil Field was discovered by a friend of Whittier’s, who had come across an oil seep while traveling on horseback between Coalinga and Bakersfield. After visiting the property, Whittier assembled a group of four other investors, including longtime partner Burton Green, and the group purchased the 33,000 acre property for $1,000,000.

Using a wooden derrick and steam powered cable tool drilling, the Belridge Oil Company Well No. 101 was begun on March 11, 1911. The driller’s log showed that the well penetrated 238m of clay, tar sand, oil sand, and shale. Production was decent, but after only eight years of development, Belridge Oil Company stated that the “Southern Belridge Field is entirely drilled up” and the “future production is estimated to be about 1,800,000 barrels”. The Belridge Oil Field's second life began in the 1930's when more powerful steel derricks and rotary drilling rigs were able to reach deeper into the field, and then again in the 1960's when steam injections allowed for the production of heavy oil. https://geoexpro.com/the-many-lives-of-belridge/

Belridge Oil Company retained control of operations until 1979 when Shell Oil purchased the company along with most of the production rights on the South Belridge Field for $3.65 billion. At the time, the sale of Belridge Oil Company was the largest corporate acquisition in U.S. history. https://www.newspapers.com/image/388294755/?terms=%22belridge%20oil%22&match=1

Peak daily production for the 24 km long by 5 km wide Belridge Oil Field was 186,000 barrels in 1986, and in 1995 the South Belridge field reached one billion barrels of cumulative oil production, the sixth field in California to do so and the 15th field in the nation. https://web.archive.org/web/20010417181749/http://www.bakersfield.com/special/oil100/s-belridge.asp

By 2012 the field had produced over 1.6 barrels of oil, with an estimate of the 6 billion still in place. https://www.searchanddiscovery.com/documents/2011/20110allan/ndx_allan.pdf More than 25,000 wells have been drilled in the structure, giving Belridge the closest well spacing of any field in the world, with vertical and horizontal wells as close as 11.5m. Through the use of new technology and ideas, over 700 new wells have been drilled and completed each year since 2005 in an effort to recover much more oil.

=== Rodeo Land and Water Company ===
As well as holding interests in those companies, Whittier was a large stockholder and director of Rodeo Land and Water Company which held 3,100 acres in the areas of which would become Beverly Hills, as well as the Amalgamated Oil Company, Titicaca Oil Company, and the Inca Oil Company as well as several more interests in Oklahoma. He also acquired large areas of land in the Lost Hills districts helping organize the Belridge Oil Company, which held 31,000 acres in that district.

In 1935, his family started the Whittier Trust Company, a multi-family office and state-chartered wealth management company.

=== The Whittier Mansion ===
The Whittier Mansion, on a 3.6-acre (15,000 m^{2}) plot on Sunset Boulevard, gained notoriety after its purchase in 1978 by Saudi Sheik Mohammed al Fassi, who boldly redecorated the Italian-Renaissance style mansion, painting the property’s classical statues, visible from the street, in flesh tones – genitalia and all. The garish painted statues turned the mansion into a tourist attraction until it was heavily damaged in a 1980 fire and torn down five years later. The Jerk was filmed at this mansion.
