= Rex Lotery =

American architect

Rex Lotery (August 19, 1930 – January 31, 2007) was an architect who combined architecture, urban design and consensus planning in his designs. He was born outside London, England on August 19, 1930, and moved to Manhattan, New York in 1939. In 1952, he received his Bachelor of Architecture degree from Rensselaer Polytechnic Institute.

In 1956, after working for William Steenson and Barienbrock and Murry, he started his own architectural firm in Los Angeles where he worked on his own until 1968. In 1969, he helped to launch Kahn Kappe, Lotery Bocatto, Architects/Planners. From 1984 to 1992, Lotery was the President of Urban Innovations Group at UCLA.

Rex Lotery built Elvis and Priscilla Presley’s marital house in the Trousdale Estates. He is on the list of Master Architects of Beverly Hills, which serves as one of the criteria by which significant buildings may get historic preservation ordinances.
