= Westdale, Los Angeles =

Westdale
- Neighborhood of Los Angeles
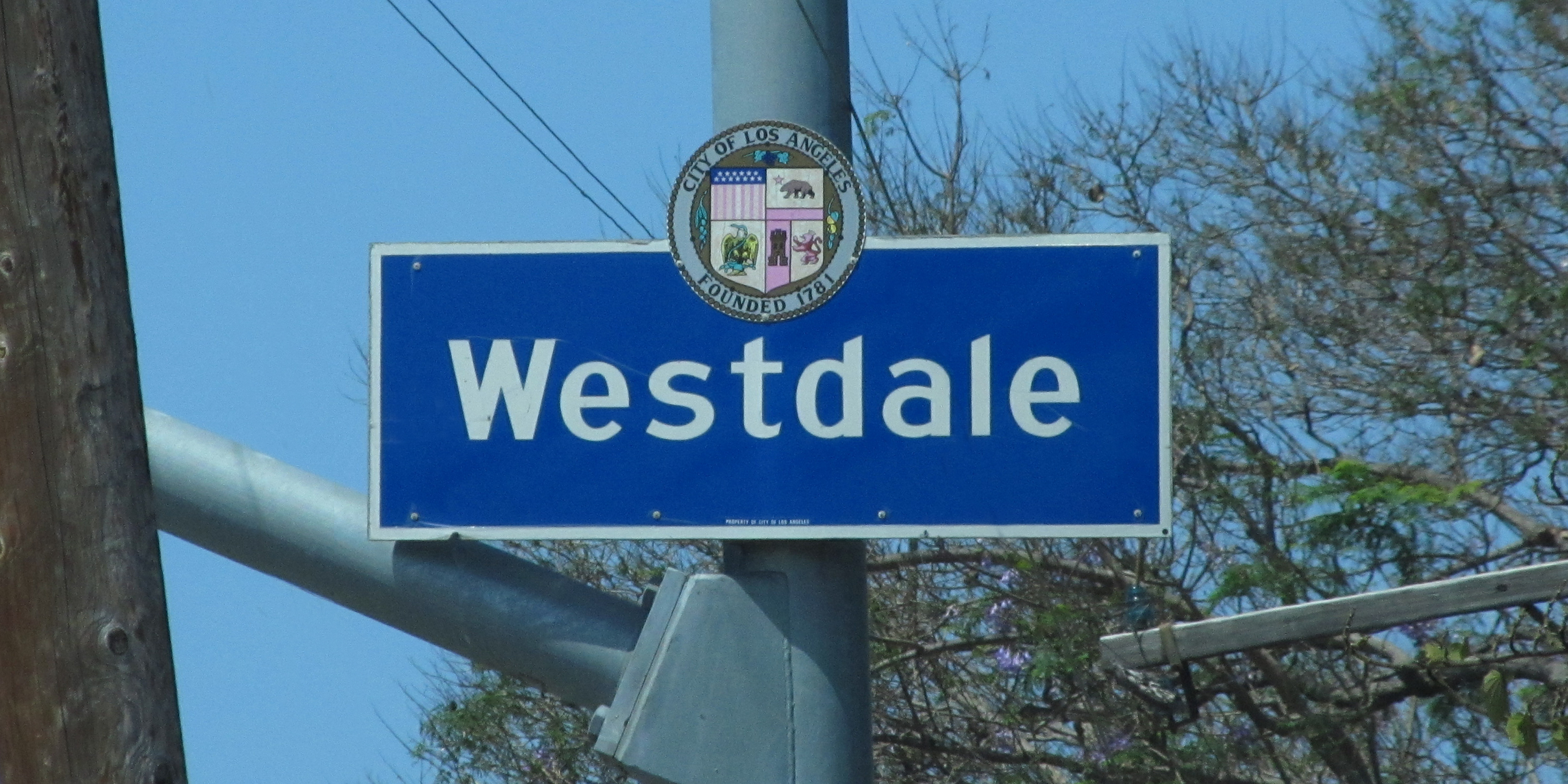
- Westdale neighborhood sign

- Location within Western Los Angeles
- Coordinates: 34°01′42″N 118°26′27″W
- Country: United States
- State: California
- County: Los Angeles
- City: Los Angeles
- Time zone: Pacific
- Zip Code: 90066
- Area code: 310

Westdale is a neighborhood in the Westside region of Los Angeles, California. It is represented by the Mar Vista Community Council.

== Geography ==
Westdale is roughly bounded on the north by Gateway Boulevard, on the south by Palms Boulevard, on the east by Sawtelle Boulevard and the west by Bundy Drive.

== History ==
Originally known as Stephen's Ranch, with citrus orchards and bean fields, Westdale was developed in 1947 by real estate developer Paul Trousdale (1915-1990). He hired architect Allen Siple (1900-1973) to design the homes. He worked with Siple on two other new neighborhoods he developed, the earlier 1940s Tahquitz River Estates in Palm Springs, and the later 1950s Trousdale Estates in Beverly Hills.

Trousdale built 450 single-story tract homes in the original development. Early residents were soldiers back from World War II using the GI Bill, who moved to Southern California after serving in the Pacific Theater. Over time, two additional tracts were added to Westdale.

== Present day ==
There are now 900 homes in Westdale. Most were built in the 1940s, and many gardens have old citrus trees dating back to the original orchard. The architecture styles include Ranch-style, American Colonial Revival, Monterey Colonial Revival, and Regency Revival.

The Westdale Homeowners' Association publishes a quarterly newsletter, The Westdale Villager.

== Government ==
Westdale is represented by the Mar Vista Community Council.
