= Mar Vista, Los Angeles =

Mar Vista
- Neighborhood of Los Angeles
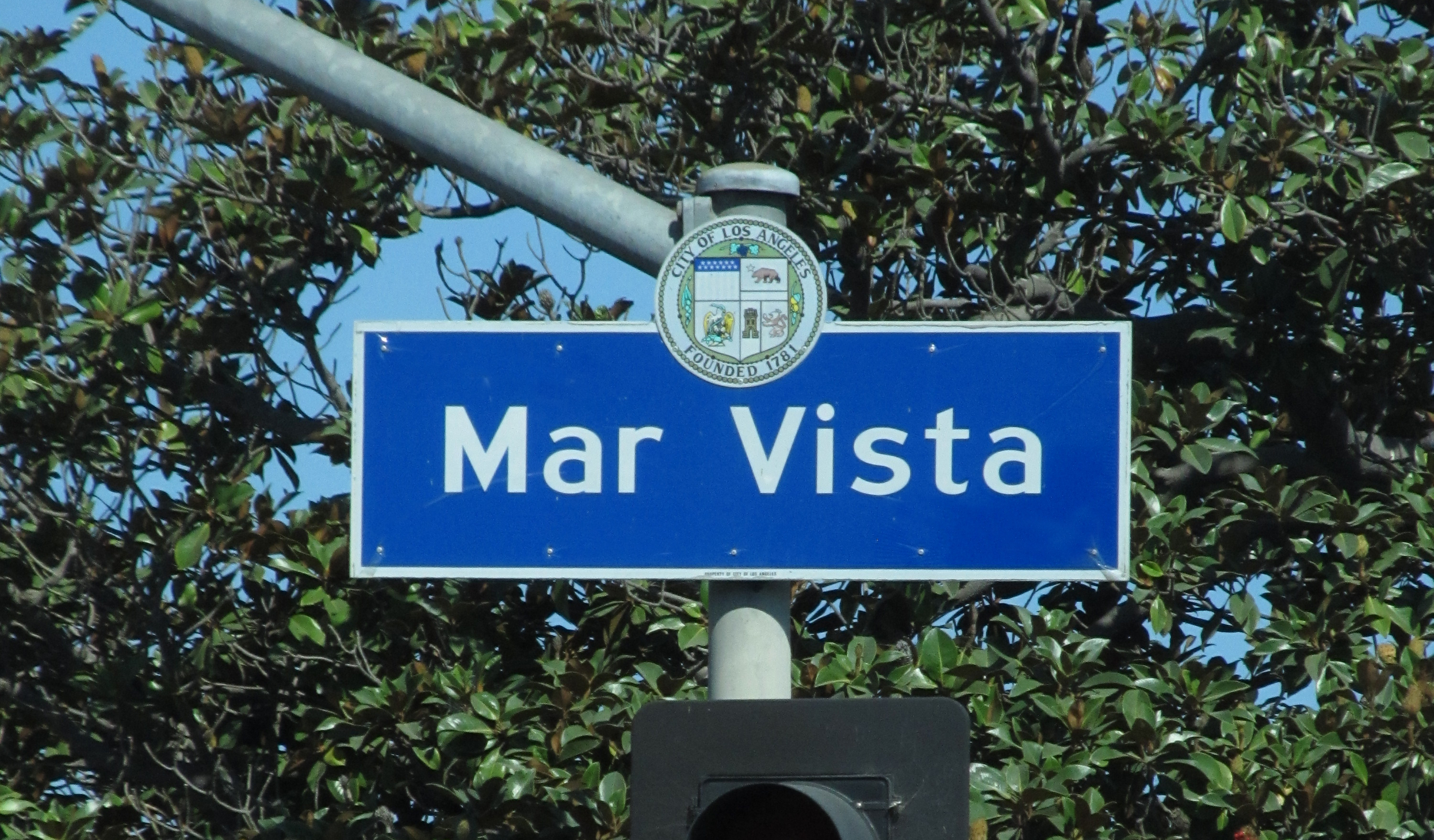
- Mar Vista signage located at the intersection of Rose Avenue & Walgrove

- Location within Western Los Angeles
- Coordinates: 34°00′20″N 118°26′06″W
- Country: United States of America
- State: California
- County: Los Angeles
- Time zone: Pacific
- Zip Code: 90066
- Area code: 310

Mar Vista is a neighborhood on the Westside of Los Angeles, California. In 1927, Mar Vista became the 70th community to be annexed to Los Angeles. It was designated as an official city neighborhood in 2006.

== History ==
Mar Vista was called Ocean Park Heights from 1904 to 1924. Ocean Park Heights developed along a rail line - the Venice Short Line from downtown Los Angeles to Venice Beach - built in 1902 (present day Venice Boulevard). In 1927, Mar Vista became the 70th community to be annexed to Los Angeles. The neighborhood experienced massive growth in the 1950s through the 1970s. The area north of Venice Boulevard was filled in with suburban single-family development, including many surviving examples of mid-century modern residential architecture along Beethoven, Meier, and Moore street. These developments were originally built as basic, low-cost homes in a relatively far-flung region of the city. But as the surrounding areas of Western Los Angeles have developed into major business and tourism centers, property values have rapidly increased to the point where, as of 2020, older homes marketed as tear-downs regularly sell for over $1 million. In 2006, the city designated Mar Vista as an official neighborhood and installed signage.

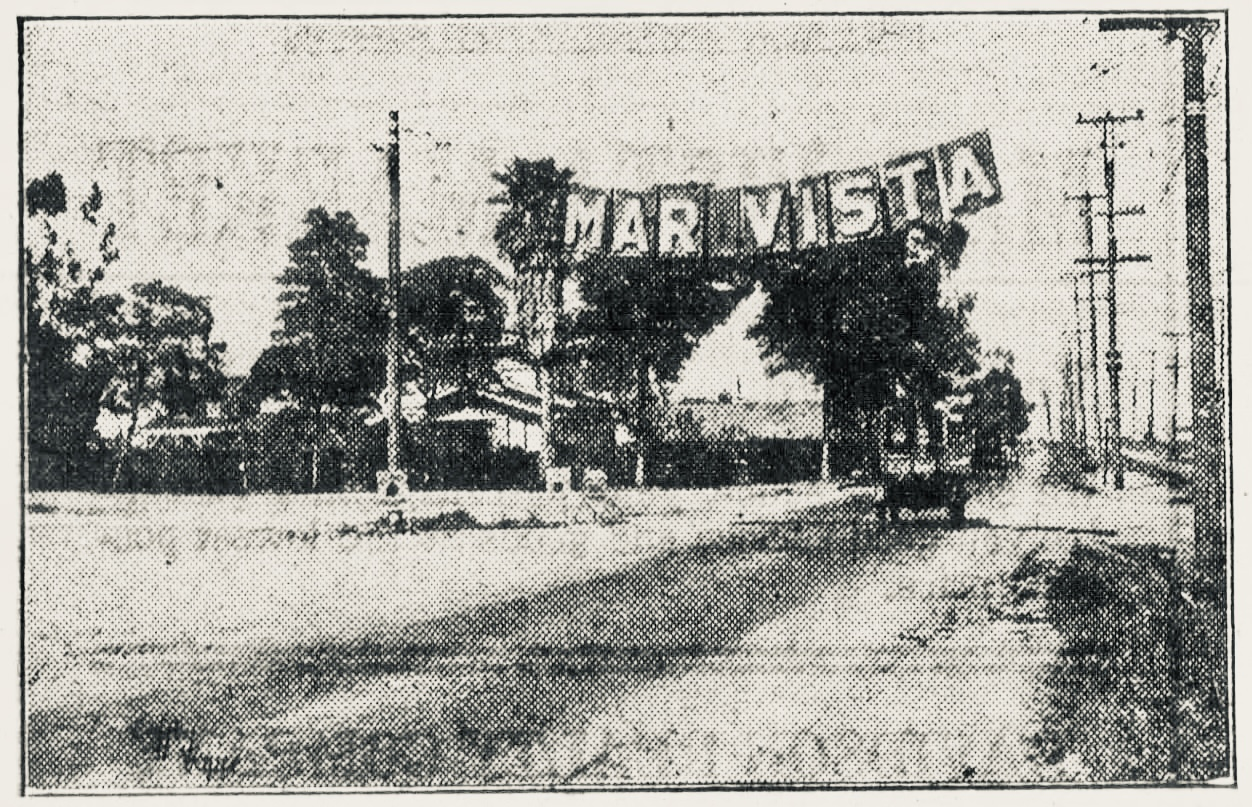
"MAR VISTA" - "Mar Vista stands at the intersection of two important traffic arteries; Venice and Grandview boulevards. An original sign, bearing the name of the community, is suspended above the roads at this point. Thousands of motorists and passengers in the P.E. cars have become familiar with the community building that is proceeding there, through this sign." (Venice Evening Vanguard, June 22, 1926)

The section of the neighborhood south of Venice Boulevard is zoned for apartment buildings, and as such, it is significantly more densely populated. This section is home to a large concentration of dingbat apartment buildings, which are mostly subject to Los Angeles' Rent Stabilization Ordinance, allowing many long-term renters to stay in the area despite increasingly expensive rents and property values.

=== Historic neighborhoods ===
- Mar Vista Oval District - Circa 1912, Palm Place development laid out north of Washington Boulevard and south of the Venice Short Line, now Venice Boulevard. Related: Just south of the planned Palm Place, land purchased in 1913 for a development to be called Kensington Green. At the time of purchase the land contained an orchard of walnut trees and “one of the oldest eucalyptus groves in Los Angeles,” with 1,700 ft (520 m) of frontage on Washington Boulevard, and the Redondo Beach via Playa Del Rey Line running along the south boundary.
- Mormon Hill

== Geography ==
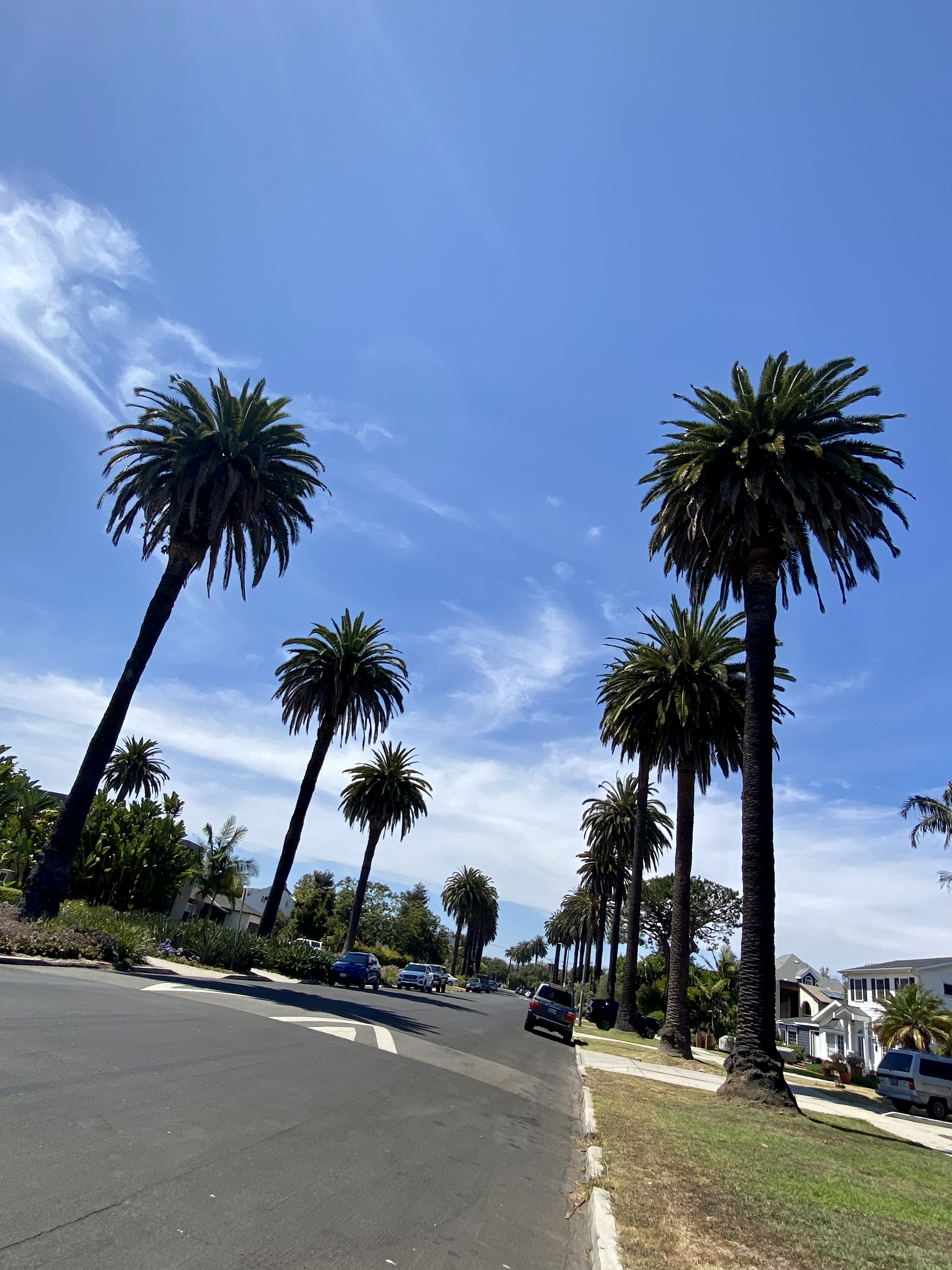
Century-old Canary Island palms of the Mar Vista Oval District

=== City of Los Angeles ===
Per City Council action on February 21, 2006, Mar Vista was designated as the area bounded by: the Santa Monica City border between I-10 and Walgrove Avenue; Walgrove Avenue between the Santa Monica City border and the Culver City border on the west, the Culver City border between Walgrove Avenue and I-405 on the south, I-405 between the Culver City border and I-10 on the east, and I-10 between the Santa Monica City border and 1-405 on the north.

At that time, the Department of Transportation was instructed to install signs at the following locations to identify "Mar Vista": Venice Boulevard at Beethoven Street, Venice Boulevard at Sawtelle Boulevard, Centinela Avenue at Mitchell Avenue, Rose Avenue at Walgrove Avenue, Barrington Avenue at National Boulevard, Centinela Avenue at Airport Avenue.

The Venice Neighborhood Council has noted an exception to the above boundaries. The area between Walgrove Avenue and Beethoven Street contains schools serving the Venice Community, including Venice High, Mark Twain Junior High, Walgrove Elementary, and Beethoven Elementary. The grounds of these schools are within the Venice Neighborhood Council and overlap areas with the Mar Vista Community Council.

The City of Los Angeles official zoning map ZIMAS also shows Venice High School as included in Venice, and not Mar Vista.

=== Mapping L.A. ===
According to the Mapping L.A. project of the Los Angeles Times, Mar Vista's boundaries are: the San Diego Freeway to the Culver City boundary at Venice Boulevard on the northeast, the Culver City line on the southeast, Walgrove Avenue on the southwest, and the Santa Monica city boundary on the northwest. The northern apex of the Mar Vista neighborhood is at the San Diego Freeway and National Boulevard and the southern is at Washington Boulevard and Tivoli Avenue.

Mar Vista is adjoined on the northeast by Palms, on the east, southeast and south by Culver City, on the west by Venice and on the northwest by Santa Monica.

=== Climate ===
Climate data for Mar Vista, Los Angeles
Month	Jan	Feb	Mar	Apr	May	Jun	Jul	Aug	Sep	Oct	Nov	Dec	Year
Mean daily maximum °F (°C)	67 (19)	67 (19)	68 (20)	70 (21)	71 (22)	75 (24)	78 (26)	79 (26)	78 (26)	75 (24)	71 (22)	67 (19)	72 (22)
Mean daily minimum °F (°C)	48 (9)	50 (10)	51 (11)	53 (12)	56 (13)	59 (15)	62 (17)	63 (17)	62 (17)	59 (15)	52 (11)	48 (9)	55 (13)
Average precipitation inches (mm)	3.15 (80)	3.21 (82)	2.61 (66)	0.58 (15)	0.25 (6.4)	0.05 (1.3)	0.02 (0.51)	0.09 (2.3)	0.11 (2.8)	0.35 (8.9)	0.94 (24)	1.87 (47)	13.22 (336)

== Demographics ==
=== 2000 ===
The 2000 U.S. census counted 35,492 residents in the 2.9-square-mile Mar Vista neighborhood—an average of 12,259 people per square mile, about the norm for Los Angeles; in 2008, the city estimated that the population had increased to 37,447. The median age for residents was 35, considered the average for Los Angeles; the percentage of residents aged 19 through 34 was among the county's highest.

Mar Vista was highly diverse ethnically, but the percentage of Asian people was high for the county. The breakdown was whites, 51.3%; Latinos, 29.1%; Asians, 12.8%, blacks, 3.5%; and others, 3.4%. Mexico (36%) and Korea (6%) were the most common places of birth for the 33.5% of the residents who were born abroad—considered an average figure for Los Angeles.

Forty-two percent of Mar Vista residents aged 25 and older had earned a four-year degree by 2000, a high figure for both the city and the county. The percentages of residents of that age with a bachelor's degree or a master's degree were also considered high for the county.

The percentages of never-married men (40.8%), divorced men (8.4%), and divorced women (12.5%) were among the county's highest. The percentages of veterans who served during World War II or the Korean War were among the county's highest.

=== 2008 ===
The median yearly household income in 2008 dollars was $62,611, an average figure for Los Angeles. The average household size of 2.3 people was low for both the city and the county. Renters occupied 60.6% of the housing stock, and house- or apartment owners held 39.4%.

== Services ==
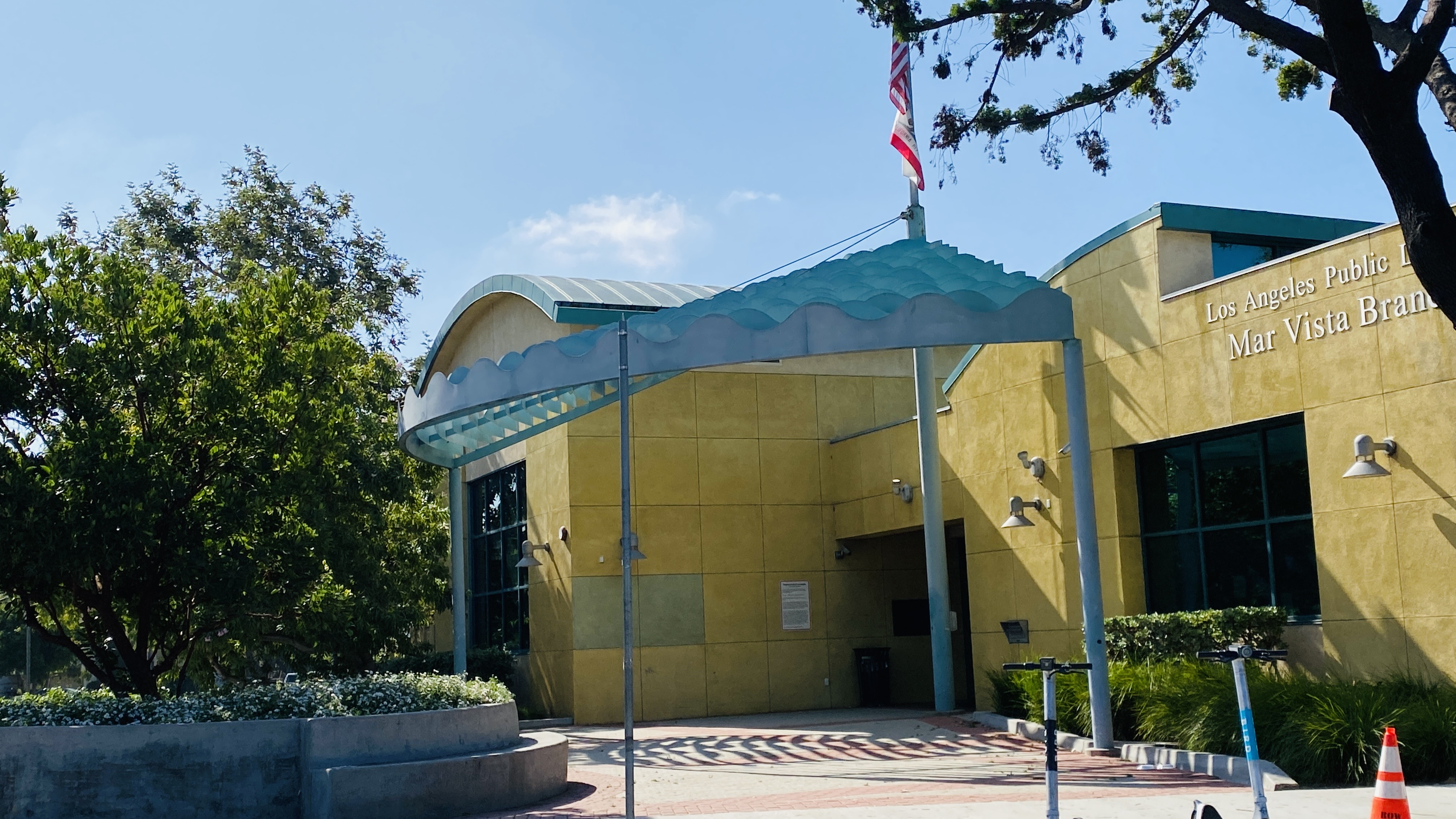
Mar Vista branch, Los Angeles Public Library

=== Health ===
The Los Angeles County Department of Health Services SPA 5 West Area Health Office serves Mar Vista.

=== Emergency services ===
The Los Angeles Fire Department operates Station 62, which serves a portion of Venice as well.

Los Angeles Police Department operates the Pacific Division Police Station, serving the neighborhood.

=== Community Council ===
The Mar Vista Community Council is the city-sanctioned neighborhood council for Mar Vista and other small neighborhoods (referred to as "zones"), including Hilltop, Westdale, North Westdale, and others.

=== Transportation ===
Mar Vista is served by LAnow, a new on-demand shared-ride service. Service started in May 2019.

== Public libraries ==
The neighborhood is served by the Los Angeles Public Library system. There is one branch that serves the neighborhood.

- Mar Vista branch - located at 12006 Venice Boulevard, Mar Vista

== Education ==
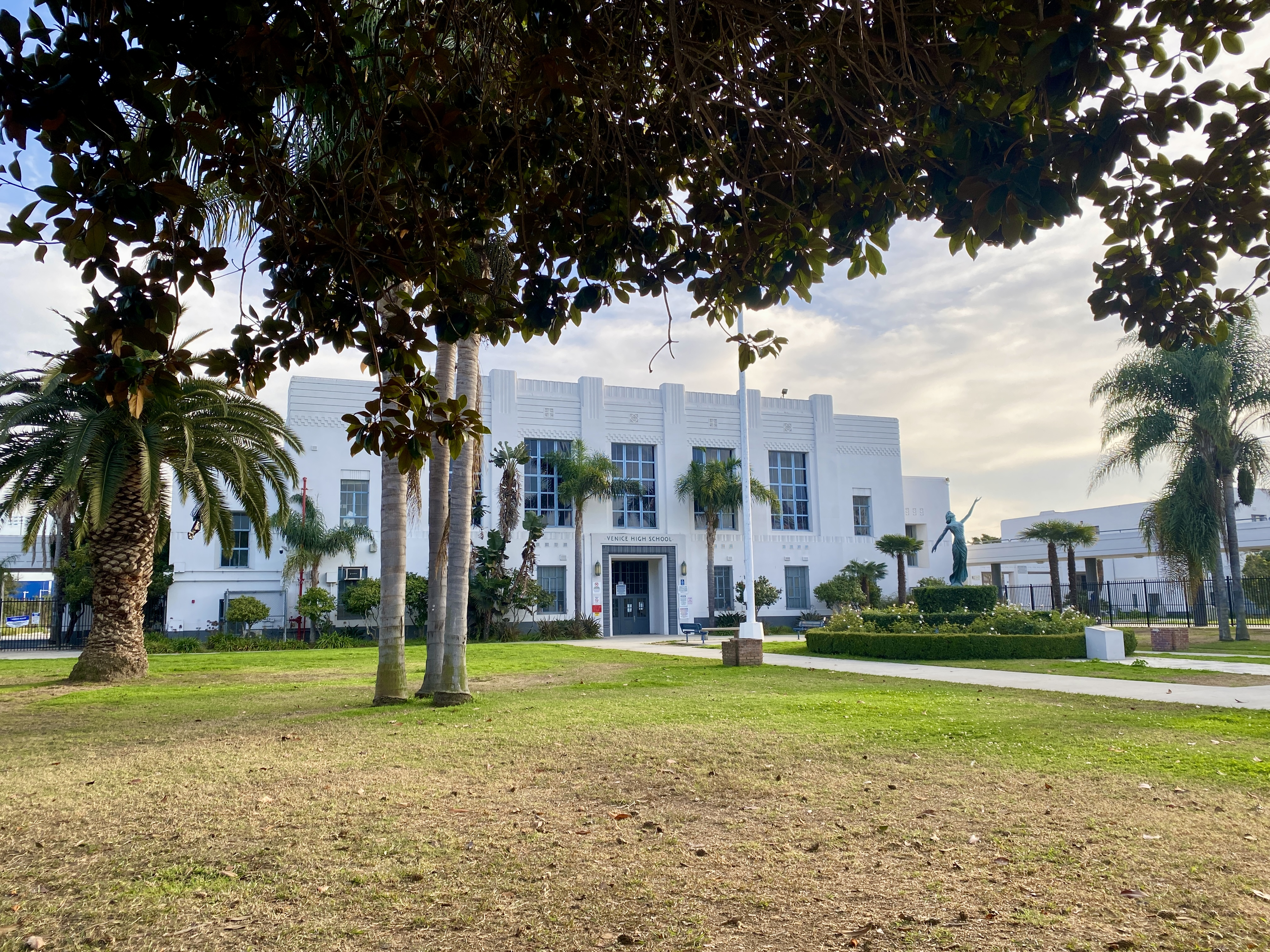
Venice High School

The schools within Mar Vista are as follows:

- Mar Vista Elementary School, LAUSD, 3330 Granville Avenue
- Walgrove Avenue Elementary School, LAUSD, 1630 Walgrove Avenue
- Beethoven Street Elementary School, LAUSD, 3711 Beethoven Street
- Mark Twain Middle School, LAUSD, 2224 Walgrove Avenue
- James J. McBride Special Education Center, LAUSD, 3960 Centinela Avenue
- Venice Senior High School, LAUSD, 13000 Venice Boulevard, established in 1910 (then called "Venice Union Polytechnic High School") when classes were held in an old lagoon bathhouse two blocks from the beach. It moved to a new neo-romanesque structure at its present location a decade later.
- Venice Community Adult School, LAUSD, 13000 Venice Boulevard
- Phoenix Continuation School, LAUSD, 12971 Zanja Street
- Grand View Boulevard Elementary in School, LAUSD
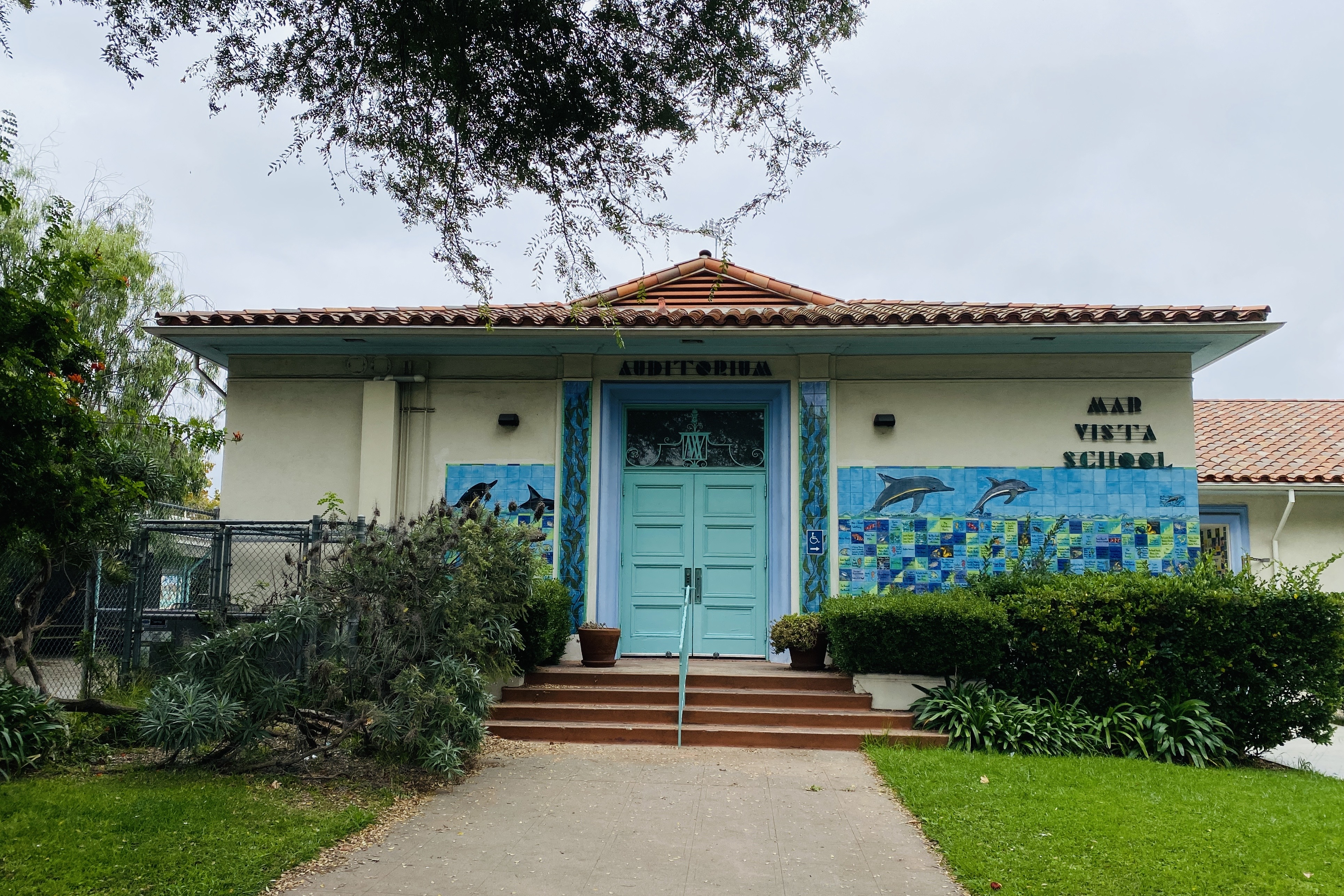
Mar Vista Elementary School

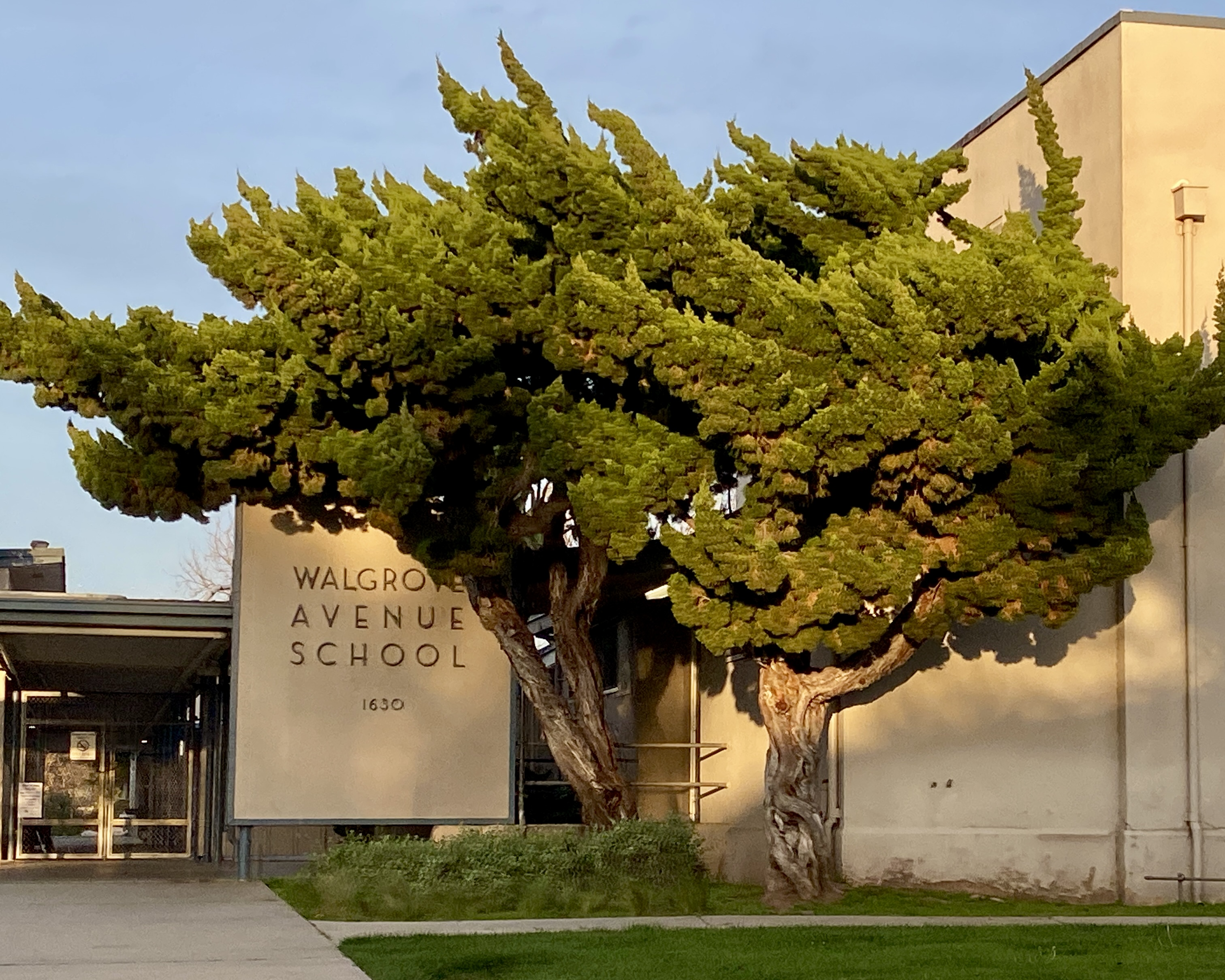
Walgrove Avenue Elementary School

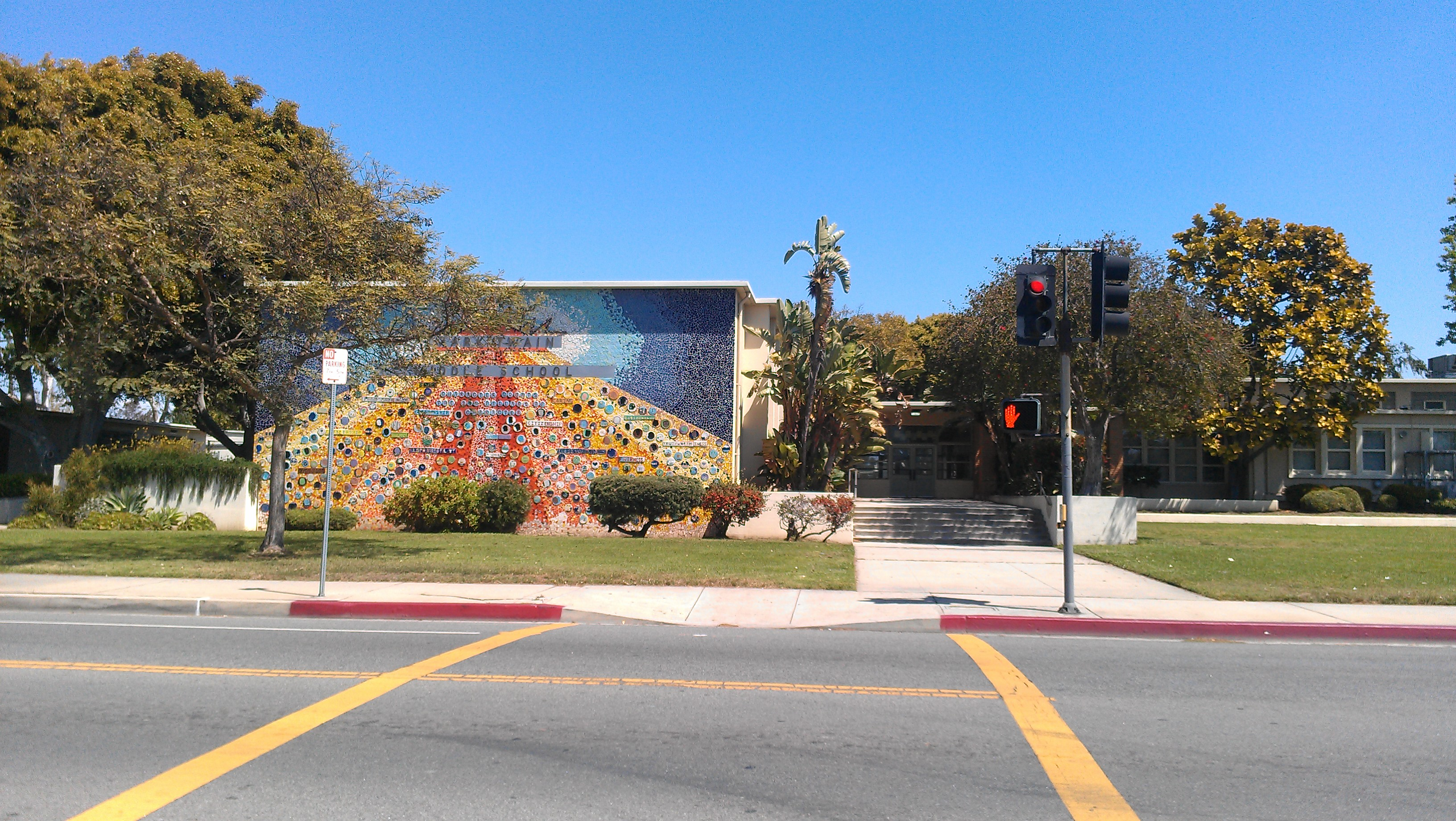
Mark Twain Middle School

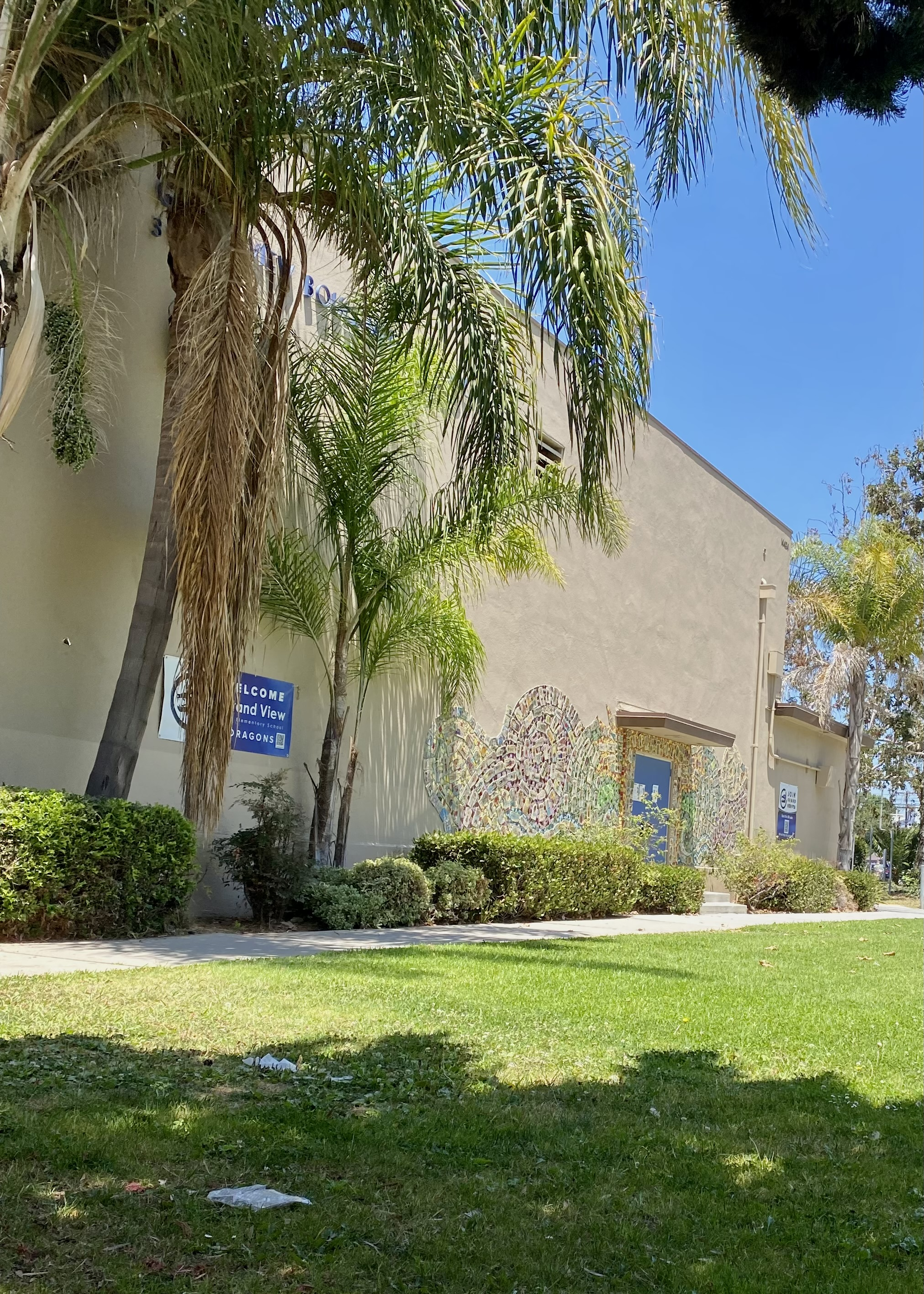
Grand View Boulevard Elementary School

As of 2014, the Wiseburn School District allows parents in Mar Vista to send their children to Wiseburn schools on inter-district transfers.

== Parks and recreation ==
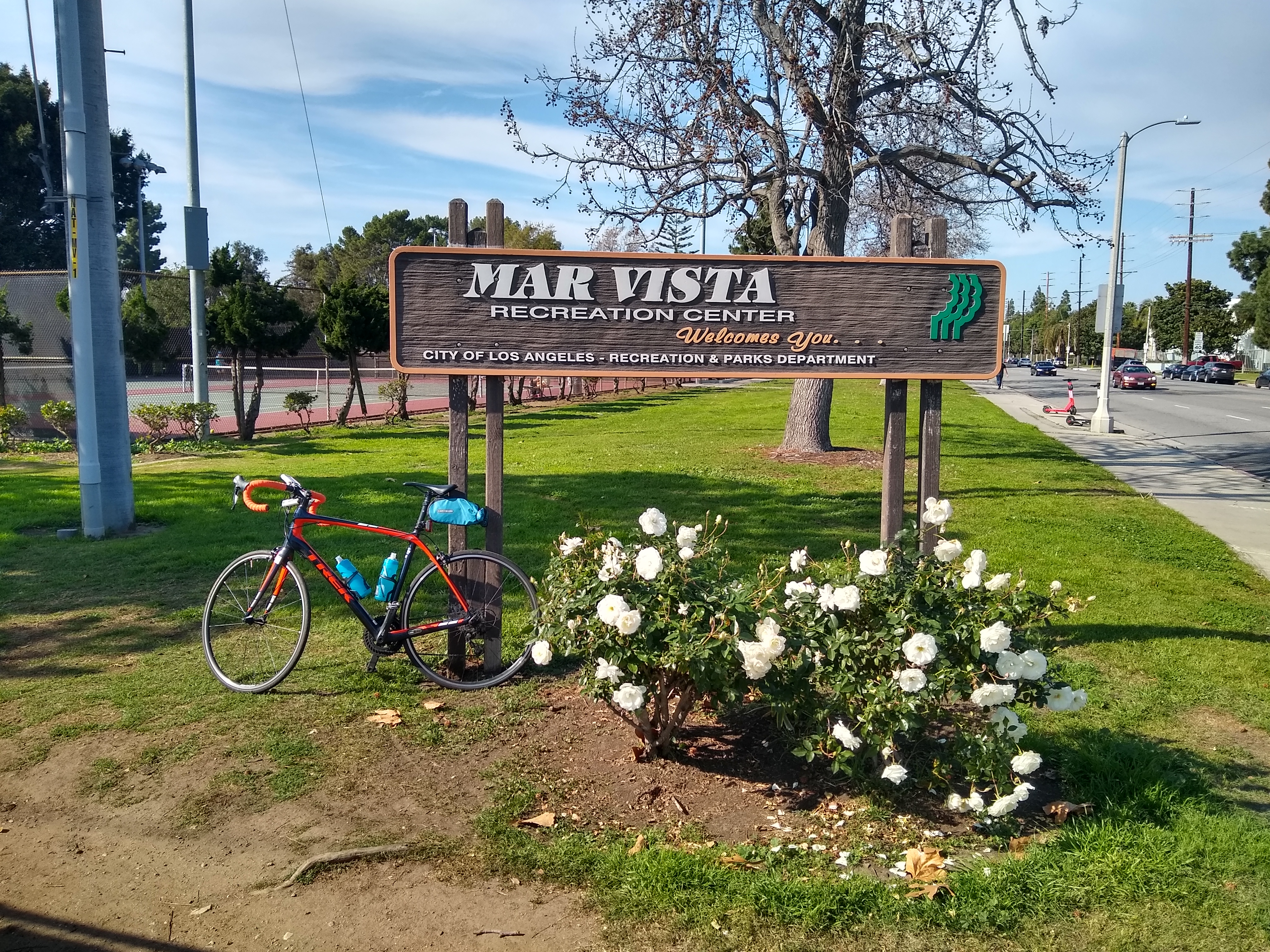
Mar Vista Recreation Center

The Mar Vista Recreation Center has an auditorium, barbecue pits, an unlighted baseball diamond, lighted indoor basketball courts, lighted outdoor basketball courts, a children's play area, an indoor gymnasium without weights, an outdoor roller hockey rink, an outdoor AstroTurf soccer field, picnic tables, a lighted tennis court, an outdoor pool, and a lighted volleyball court.

== Notable residents ==
- Fatty Arbuckle - actor
- William Basinski - avant-garde composer best known for his work The Disintegration Loops.
- Lloyd Bridges - actor
- Neil Denari - Architect
- Jimmy Fallon - host of Tonight show
- John Frusciante - musician
- Kesha - Singer, Songwriter
- Belita Moreno - Actress, played Benita Lopez on the George Lopez show.
- Jennifer Steinkamp - Installation artist.
- Tim Considine - Former Disney, TV and film actor, renowned racing author
