= Allen Siple =

American architect

- Born: Allen George Siple; July 9, 1900; Otsego, Michigan, U.S.
- Died: January 10, 1973 (aged 72); Los Angeles County, California, U.S.
- Education: University of Southern California; École nationale supérieure des Beaux-Arts
- Occupation: Architect
- Parent(s): George H. Siple; Jessie Siple

Allen George Siple (July 9, 1900 – January 10, 1973) was an American architect, working in Southern California from the 1930s to 1960s.

== Early life ==
Siple was born on July 9, 1900 in Otsego, Michigan. His father, George H. Siple, was Canadian and his mother, Jessie, was from Michigan. In 1924, his father retired to Southern California and they moved into a house located at 972 Arapahoe Street, Los Angeles, California. He graduated from the University of Southern California and the École nationale supérieure des Beaux-Arts in Paris, France.

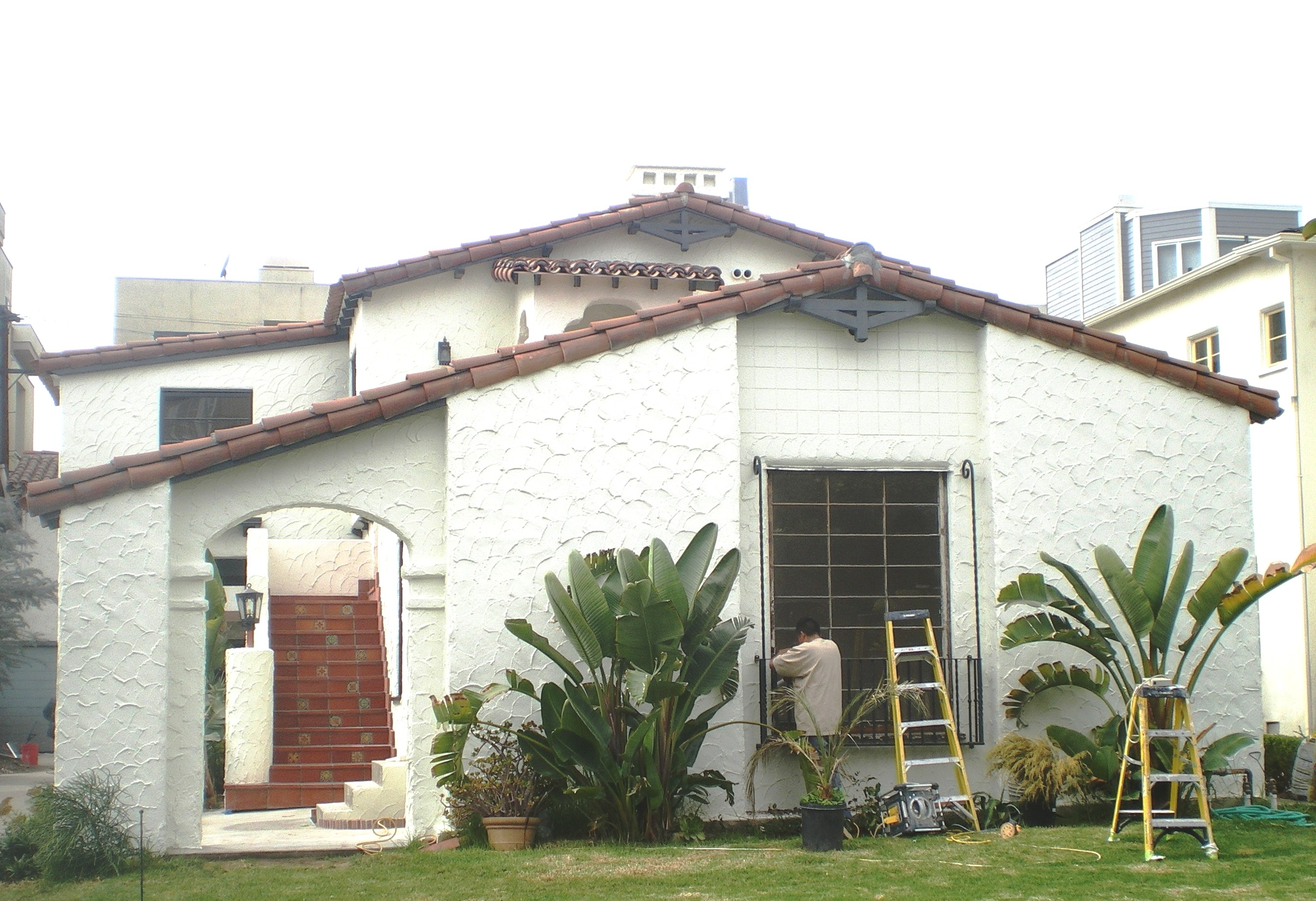
Siple House in West Los Angeles (1930s), a Los Angeles Historic-Cultural Monument

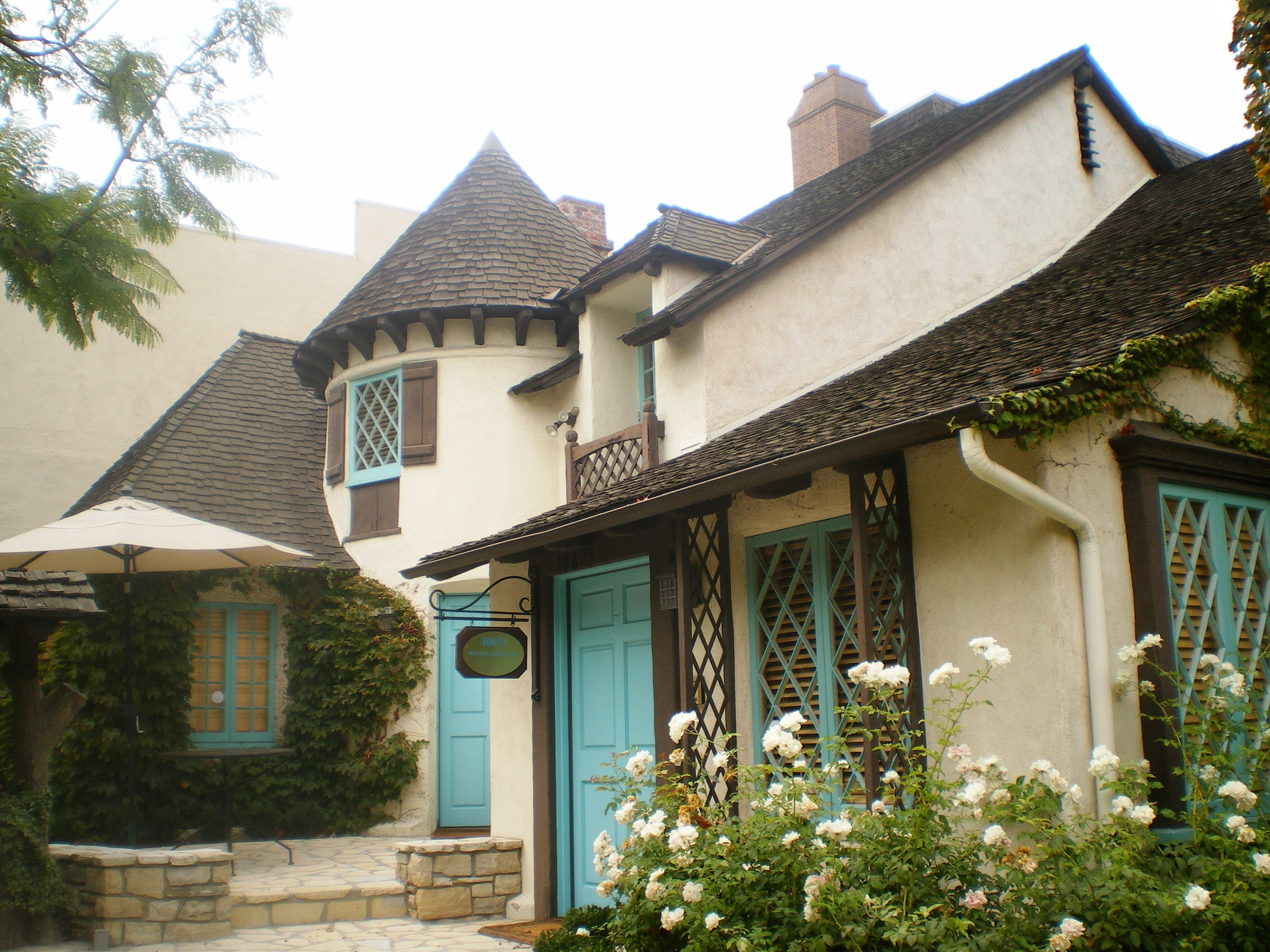
Grove Bungalow Court (1932) Santa Monica Boulevard, Westwood

== Career ==
In Los Angeles, Siple worked as an architect for the Janss Investment Company. They were developing the community of Westwood in Los Angeles.

=== 1930s ===
In 1930, Siple designed the W.R. Balsom Jr. House in Westwood Hills. In 1932, he designed "The Grove," also known as the "Grove Bungalow Court," located at 10669-10683 Santa Monica Boulevard in Westwood, Los Angeles. In 1940, Edla Muir (1906-1971) added two rear cottages. The property became a Los Angeles Historic-Cultural Monument in 1987. In 1935, he designed the residence of actress Jane Withers (1926–2021) in Westwood Hills. He designed the private residence of actor and producer Jack Conway (1887-1952) and his wife Virginia at All Hollows Farm in Pacific Palisades, California. The house was called All Hollows Farm. After Jack Conway's death in 1952, Debbie Reynolds (born 1932) and Eddie Fisher (1928-2010) purchased the property.

=== 1940s ===
From 1940 to 1941, Siple designed the Minnezawa Bell House located on Linda Flora Drive Bel Air for Monnezawa Bell (1911-1983), daughter of Alphonzo Bell (1875-1947), who developed Bel Air, California. It is a 10-room, Colonial Revival Style mansion. Later in the 1940s, he designed the "Knot Garden House," a Regency Revival mansion with Colonial Revival architecture interiors. The property came with front gardens designed by locally renowned landscape architect Edward Huntsman-Trout (1889-1974). Also in the 1940s, he designed the "South Lanai House," a Monterey Colonial style house.

During 1946 and 1947, Siple designed the model home for the Tahquitz River Estates, a neighborhood development in Palm Springs, California, by real estate developer Paul Trousdale (1915-1990). Siple also designed houses in Westdale, Los Angeles, another neighborhood developed by Trousdale.

=== 1960s ===
By the 1960s, Siple was the supervising architect for Trousdale Estates in Beverly Hills, California, another neighborhood developed by Trousdale, on the former Doheny Ranch on the east of Greystone Mansion. He also designed Paul Trousdale's private residence in Palm Springs, California.

== Death ==
Siple died at the age of 72 on January 10, 1973 in Los Angeles County, California.

== See also ==
- List of Los Angeles Historic-Cultural Monuments on the Westside
