= Mar Vista Community Council =

The Mar Vista Community Council is a city-sanctioned neighborhood council of the City of Los Angeles serving six districts or "zones," collectively referred to as Mar Vista. It is in the Westside region of Los Angeles.

== Geography ==
The Community Council area is bounded by:

- Airport Road, I-10 and National Boulevard to the north
- Overland Avenue, Sepulveda Boulevard and McLaughlin Avenue to the east
- Charnock Road, Venice Boulevard and Culver City to the south
- Walgrove Avenue, Centinela Avenue, and Venice to the west.

It also includes the Westdale neighborhood as one of its zones.

The council area at least partially encompasses ZIP codes 90064, 90034 and 90066.

== Governance ==
The board is composed of thirteen directors, six of which are "at-large," six of which are zone-specific, and one of which is the Community Director.
