= Greystone Mansion =

Historic house in California, United States

- Doheny Estate/Greystone
- U.S. National Register of Historic Places
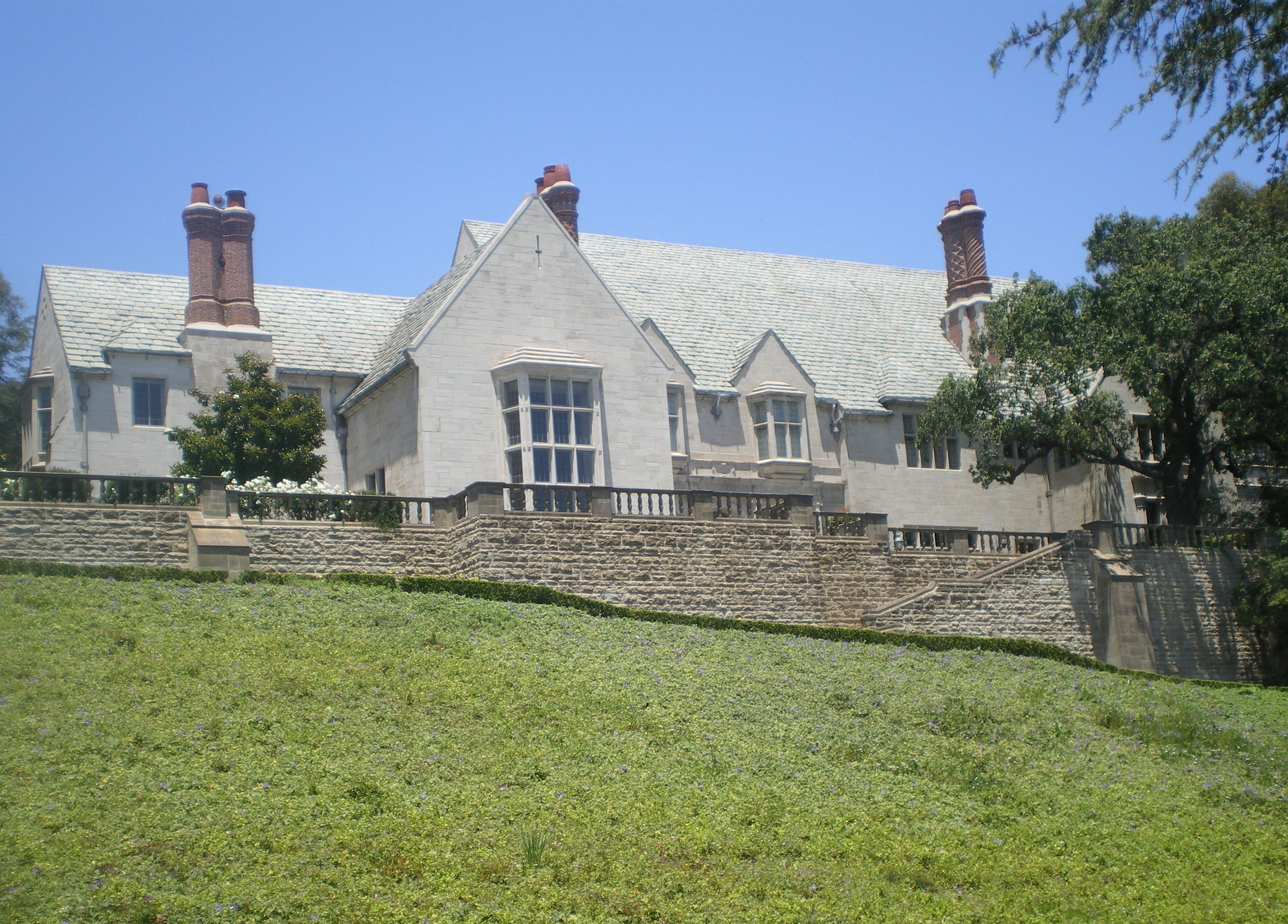
- Greystone Mansion, July 2008

- Location within Western Los Angeles
- Location: 905 Loma Vista Drive, Beverly Hills, California, U.S.
- Coordinates: 34°05′31″N 118°24′06″W
- Area: 46,000 sq ft (4,300 m^{2}).
- Built: 1928
- Built by: (Percival John) P. J. Walker and Company, San Francisco
- Architect: Gordon Kaufmann
- Architectural style: Tudor Revival
- Website: www.beverlyhills.org/Greystone
- NRHP reference No.: 76000485
- Added to NRHP: April 23, 1976

The Greystone Mansion, also known as the Doheny Mansion, is a Tudor Revival mansion in Beverly Hills, California, United States. A gift from Los Angeles oil tycoon Edward L. Doheny to his son, Edward "Ned", Jr., it was purchased by the City of Beverly Hills in 1965 and became a public park six years later.

Architect Gordon Kaufmann designed the estate, which includes landscaped grounds highlighted by distinctive formal English gardens. Construction was completed in 1928.

The Trousdale Estates property was added to the National Register of Historic Places in 1976 and is often used as a film location. The house's main staircase is one of the most famous sets in Hollywood.

== Description ==
The 55-room, 46,000 sq ft (4,300 m^{2}) Tudor-style former residence is on 16 acres (6.5 ha) of land. When it was built, the house cost over $3.1 million (equivalent to about $58 million in 2025) and was the most expensive home in California.

== History ==
Ned Doheny, his wife Lucy, and their five children moved into Greystone in October 1928. Four months later, on February 16, 1929, Doheny died in a guest bedroom in a murder-suicide with his close boyhood friend and personal confidential secretary, Theodore Hugh Plunkett.

The official story indicated that Plunkett murdered Doheny either because of a "nervous disorder" or because he was angry over not receiving a raise. Others point out that Doheny's gun was the murder weapon and that Doheny was not buried in Los Angeles' Calvary Cemetery, a Catholic cemetery, with the rest of his family, indicating he had committed suicide. Both men are buried at Forest Lawn Memorial Park, Glendale, within a few hundred yards of each other. Both were involved in the trial of Doheny's father in the Teapot Dome scandal.

"On November 28, 1921, Doheny (Sr.) signed a proposal to build the oil storage depot at Pearl Harbor in exchange for the Navy's crude oil. The very next day, Fall called Doheny and told him to go ahead and said the "loan" they had talked about was due. Doheny then dispatched his son, Edward L. Doheny, Jr. and Doheny, Jr.'s employee and friend, Hugh Theodore Plunkett, to deliver the loan. The two men went to the brokerage house of Blair and Company withdrew one hundred thousand dollars in cash from Ned's account wrapped the money in paper and put it in a little black bag and took it to Fall in his apartment at the Wardman Park Hotel in Washington. Later Ned Doheny claimed that Fall had given him a receipt for the "loan"."

Doheny's widow, Lucy, remarried and lived in the house until 1955, when she sold the estate to Paul Trousdale, who developed its grounds into Trousdale Estates and sold the mansion to Chicago industrialist Henry Crown, who rented it to film studios. In 1963 Crown planned to demolish the mansion and subdivide its lot. Beverly Hills stopped the demolition by purchasing the mansion in 1965.

The estate became a city park on September 16, 1971, and on April 23, 1976, was added to the National Register of Historic Places. The city leased the mansion to the American Film Institute from 1965 to 1982 for $1 per year, hoping the institute would pay for repairs and upkeep. It has since been used for countless television shows and films as listed below.

== Current use ==
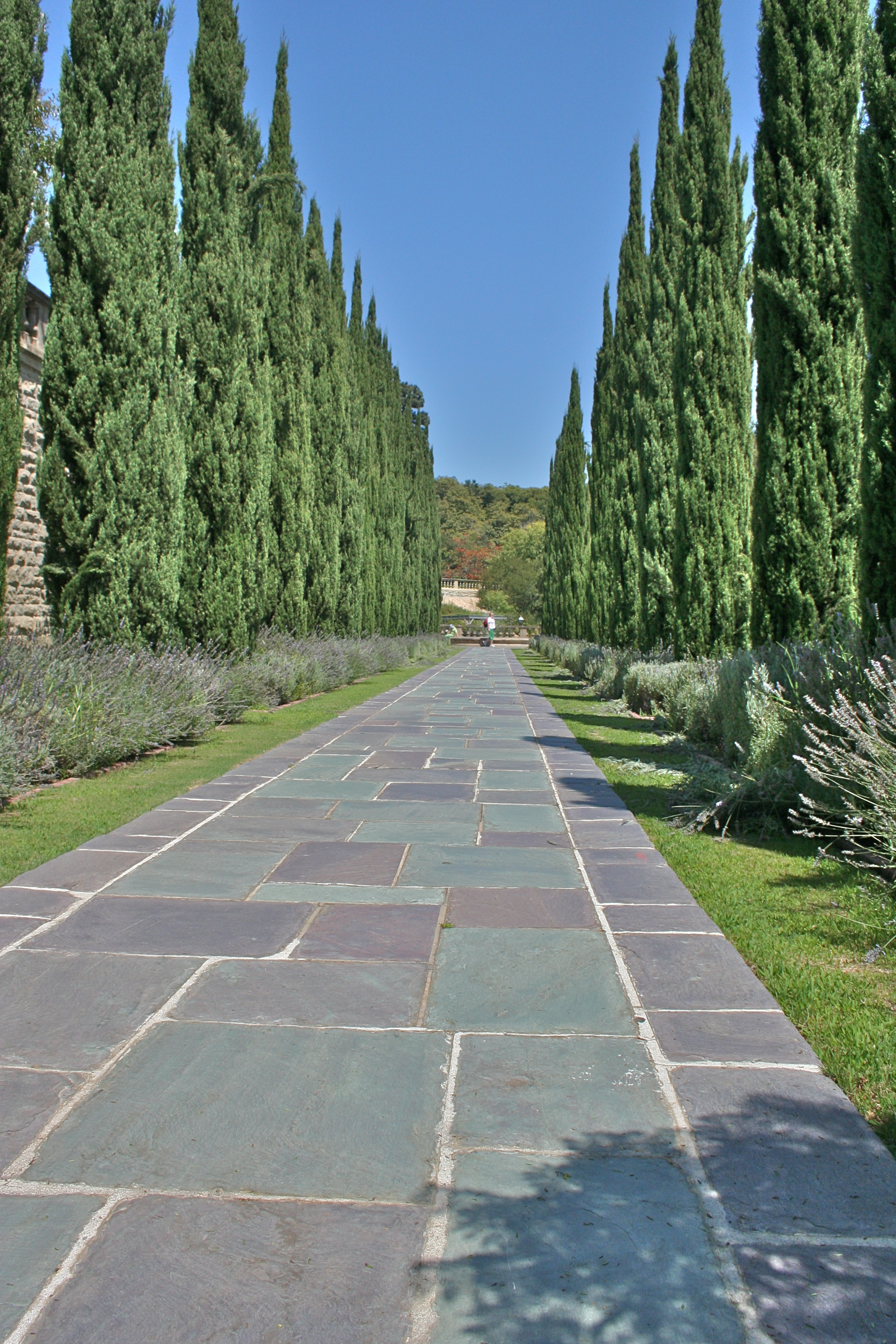
Landscape allée in the terraced gardens of Greystone

Greystone is a public park and a location for special events, including the Beverly Hills Flower & Garden Festival. The estate's beauty, manicured grounds, and Beverly Hills location make it a popular filming location. Some productions contribute to its upkeep and renovation. The 2007 film There Will Be Blood, loosely based on the life of Edward Doheny via the Upton Sinclair book Oil!, renovated its two-lane bowling alley to include it in the film.

The estate plays host each year to Catskills West, a theater arts and drama camp run by Beverly Hills Parks and Recreation, from mid-June to early August. The camp presents a theatrical play in the swimming pool area twice during the summer.

Since 2002, the mansion had been the venue for the play The Manor, by Kathrine Bates. Directed by Beverly Olevin and produced by Theatre 40 of Beverly Hills, it takes place in various rooms, with the audience separated and watching scenes in different orders. The play's plot is a fictionalized account of the Doheny family, including Edward Doheny's involvement in the Teapot Dome scandal and his son's murder. Performed annually, it is Los Angeles' longest-running play.

== Film location ==
- "(Oh) Pretty Woman" (Van Halen music video)
- "All That I've Got" (The Used Music Video)
- "I Want Love" (Elton John music video)
- "I'd Do Anything for Love (But I Won't Do That)" (Meatloaf music video)
- "Instant Crush" (Daft Punk Music Video)
- "Is It Love" (Mr. Mister music video)
- "It's Like That" (Mariah Carey music video)
- "Sister Fate" (Sheila E. music video)
- "These Are the Times" (Dru Hill Music Video)
- "Turn to You" (The Go-Go's music video)
- "We Belong Together" (Mariah Carey music video)
- Alias (Season 5 Episode 12 "There's Only One Sydney Bristow")
- All of Me
- Arrow (Queen family's mansion, Seasons 1 and 2)
- Austin Powers in Goldmember
- Bare Essence (used as the Marshalls' mansion)
- Batman & Robin
- Brainstorm
- Cabin Boy (1994 film)
- Columbo (Season 2 Episode 4 "Dagger of the Mind")
- Dark Mansions (1986 film)
- Dark Shadows (used as Collinwood, the Collins family's mansion and estate)
- Dead Ringer
- Death Becomes Her
- Dollhouse (Season 1 Episode 10 "Haunted")
- Dynasty: The Reunion
- Entourage (Season 4 Episode 10 "Snow Job")
- Eraserhead
- Falcon Crest (Season 9 Episode 6 "God of the Grape")
- Flowers in the Attic
- Forever Amber
- Garfield: A Tail of Two Kitties
- Ghostbusters II
- Gilmore Girls (used as Chilton Academy, a prestigious preparatory school)
- Hard to Kill
- Hart to Hart (Season 3 Episode 15 "The Hart of the Matter")
- House of the Damned (1963 film)
- Indecent Proposal
- Jumpin' Jack Flash
- Knight Rider (Season 1 Episode 1 "Knight of the Phoenix")
- MacGyver (Season 1 Episode 12 "Deathlock")
- Maryjane
- Mercury Rising
- Murder, She Wrote (Season 2 Episode 6 "Reflections of the Mind" and Season 3 Episode 4 "One White Rose for Death")
- NCIS (Season 8 Episode 17, Leona Phelps's mansion)
- National Treasure: Book of Secrets (Benjamin Gates and Abigail Chase's mansion. Seen when Conner, Abigail's date, drives her up to the front door, filmed in the courtyard of the Mansion)
- Phantom of the Paradise
- Picture Mommy Dead
- Remington Steele (Season 3 Episode 5 "Blue Blooded Steele")
- Revenge
- Rock Star
- Rush Hour
- Simply Mad About the Mouse (used for "The Bare Necessities" music video with Harry Connick Jr.)
- Spider-Man
- Spider-Man 2
- Spider-Man 3
- Star Trek Into Darkness
- Stripes (outside courtyard)
- The Amazing Race 17 (Finish Line in Season 17 Episode 12 "Hi. I'm Sorry. I'm in a Race")
- The Beautician and the Beast
- The Big Lebowski
- The Bodyguard
- The Bold and the Beautiful
- The Day Mars Invaded Earth (1963 film)
- The Disorderly Orderly (Jerry Lewis)
- The Golden Child
- The Holiday (2006)
- The Invisible Boy (1957)
- The Last Tycoon
- The Loved One
- The Mentalist (Season 1 Episode 21 "Miss Red")
- The Muppets (Kermit's mansion)
- The Prestige
- The Puppet Masters
- The Social Network
- The Trouble with Angels (various outside shots)
- The Vampire Diaries (promotional photoshoot)
- The West Wing (Season 1 Episode 7 "The State Dinner")
- The Witches of Eastwick
- The Young and the Restless
- There Will Be Blood
- What Women Want (Lauren Holly's character's wedding site)
- Winter Kills
- X-Men
