= Paul Trousdale =

American real estate developer (1915–1990)

Paul Whitney Trousdale Jr.
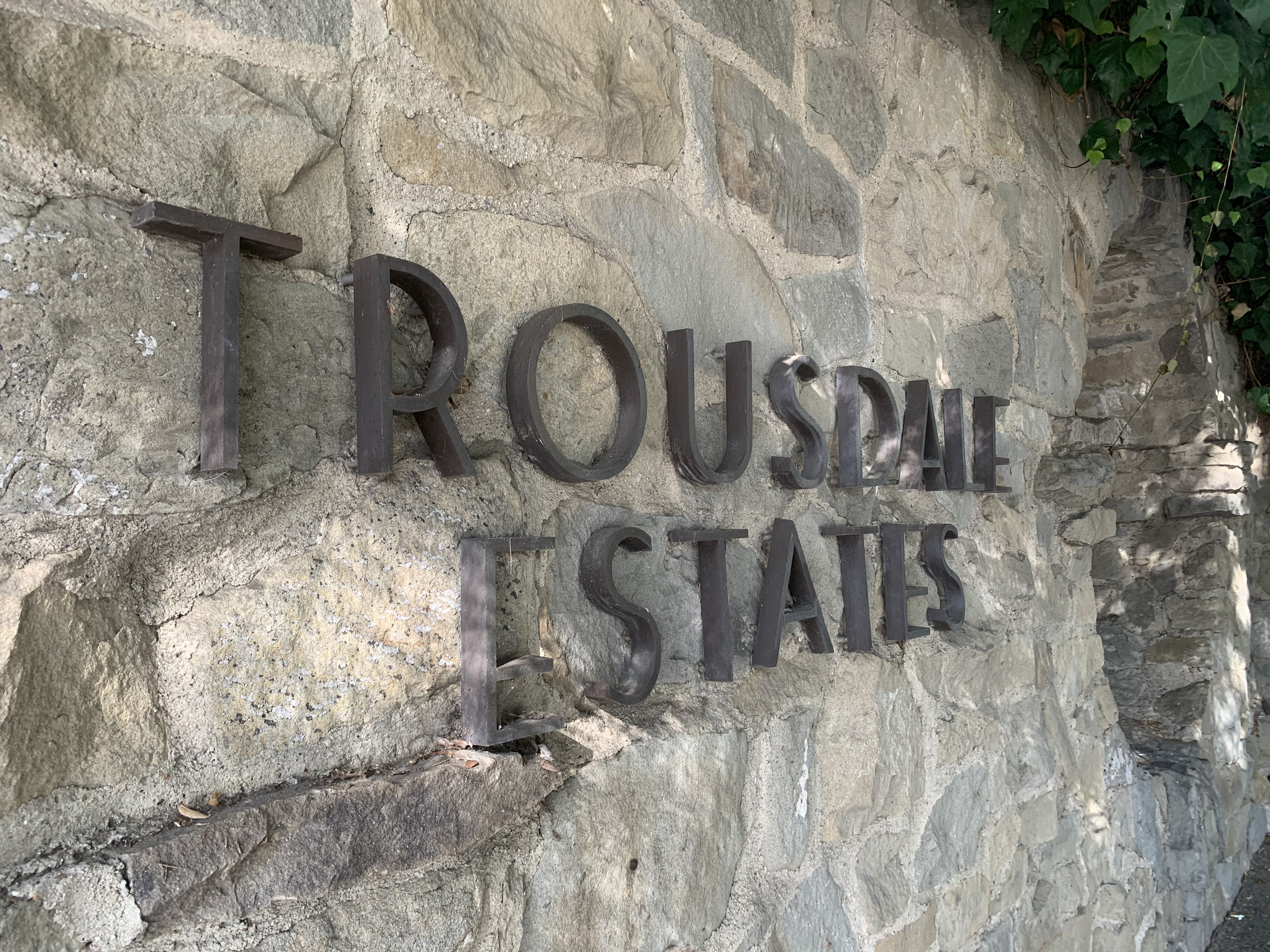
- Sign for Trousdale Estates, Beverly Hills
- Born: 1915; Gallatin, Tennessee, U.S.
- Died: April 9, 1990 (aged 75); Santa Barbara, California, U.S.
- Resting place: El Camino Memorial Park, Sorrento Valley, San Diego, U.S.
- Occupation: Real estate developer
- Spouses: Margaret Reid Trousdale; Adrienne Trousdale
- Children: 2 daughters

Paul Whitney Trousdale Jr. (1915 – April 9, 1990) was an American real estate developer. He is best known for developing the Trousdale Estates in Beverly Hills, California. He built over 25,000 homes in Southern California.

== Early life ==
Paul Whitney Trousdale was born on a farm near Gallatin, Tennessee, in 1915. He grew up with relatives in New York City, Tennessee, and Los Angeles, California. He graduated from Los Angeles High School. He spent a year at the University of Southern California, then dropped out. At USC, he sold cars, clothes and automobile spotlights. He won a $5,000 college scholarship from the New York State Industrial Department, but decided to go traveling abroad with the money.

== Career ==
Trousdale returned to Los Angeles, arriving broke in San Pedro. He started selling gum, and transitioned to real estate shortly after. By 1946, he founded the Trousdale Construction Company. He built tract homes and neighborhoods that came with churches and shopping centers, mostly in minority areas located in Long Beach, Wilmington, Compton and the San Fernando Valley. He borrowed money from Bank of America to finance his projects. The scale of his loans raised suspicions from its CEO, Amadeo Giannini, as his advances reached US$8,000,000, although this only accounted for one fourth of the entire financing of his real estate projects. In 1946, Gianninni visited him in his office in Westwood Hills, as Trousdale had already borrowed $30 million and was asking for an additional $50 million. After his visit, he granted him the loan. His firm built "two houses per day, seven days a week" and he had three hundred houses under construction at any given time.

In 1954, he purchased the Doheny Ranch from Mrs. Lucy Smith Doheny Battson, wife of Edward L. Doheny, Jr. (1893–1929), son of oil tycoon Edward L. Doheny (1856–1935), and developed it into Trousdale Estates, later home to Elvis Presley, Frank Sinatra, Dean Martin, Tony Curtis and Ray Charles. He also developed Westdale and sold furnished properties in the new neighborhood. He also built the 22-story Beverly Towers, located at 9220 Sunset Boulevard. Additionally, he developed residential communities in Marin County, California, and in Palm Springs, California. Overall, he built more than 25,000 homes throughout Southern California. Outside California, he built a hotel on Waikiki in Honolulu, Hawaii, as well as residential communities in Hawaii.

Trousdale served on the board of trustees of the University of Southern California. He corresponded with President Ronald Reagan, who agreed with him that high interest rates were "the greatest stumbling block to economic recovery" and assured him that they would be lowered.

== Personal life ==
Trousdale's first marriage was to Margaret Reid, whom he met at USC. They were married for 30 years, and had two daughters. He was married a second time, to Jean Vick, in 1954; they were married for nearly 30 years. His third wife was Adrienne Trousdale. His private residence in Palm Springs, California was designed by architect Allen Siple.

== Death ==
Trousdale died in Santa Barbara, California on April 9, 1990, aged 75. He was buried in the El Camino Memorial Park in Sorrento Valley, San Diego.
