= Trousdale Estates =

Neighborhood of Beverly Hills, California

Coordinates: 34.1035°N 118.3973°W

Trousdale Estates is a neighborhood of Beverly Hills, California, located in the foothills of the Santa Monica Mountains. It was developed in the 1950s and 1960s and is named after Paul Trousdale, a real estate developer.

As of September 2019, the average sale price of a home in Trousdale Estates was over $11 million. According to Bloomberg L.P. it is one of the 12 most expensive neighborhoods in the USA.

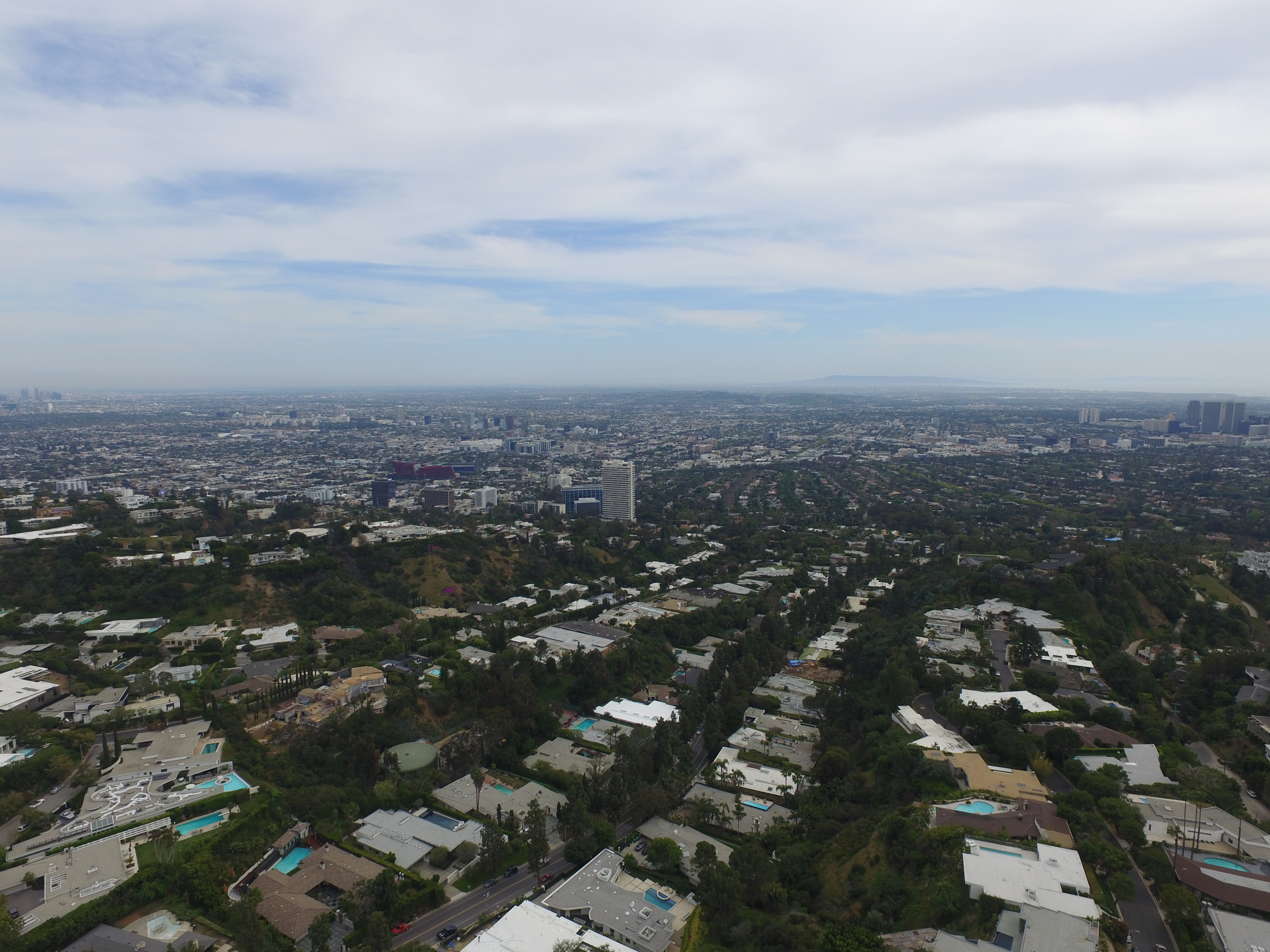
Trousdale Estates in Beverly Hills, CA

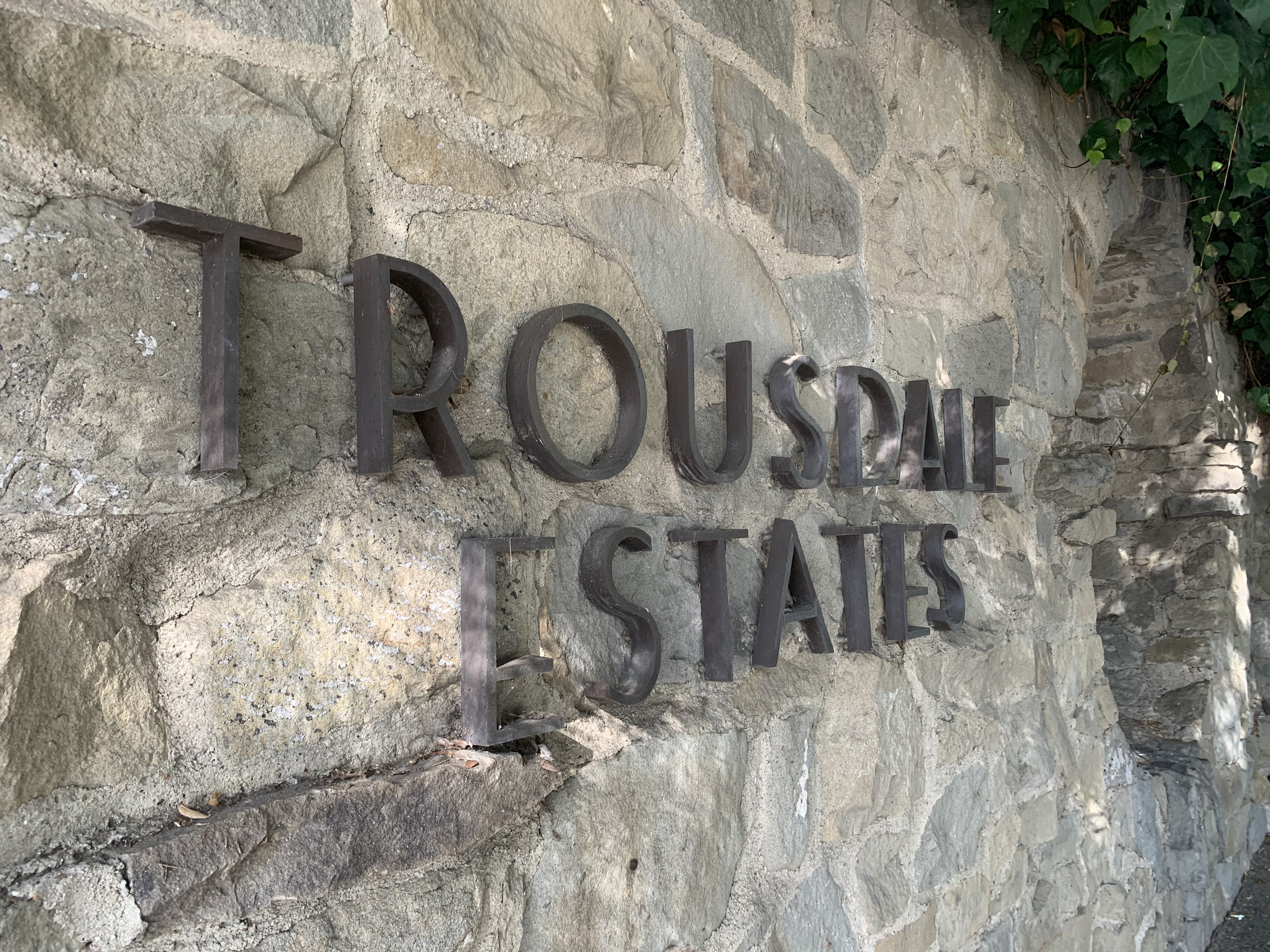
Trousdale Estates Entrance

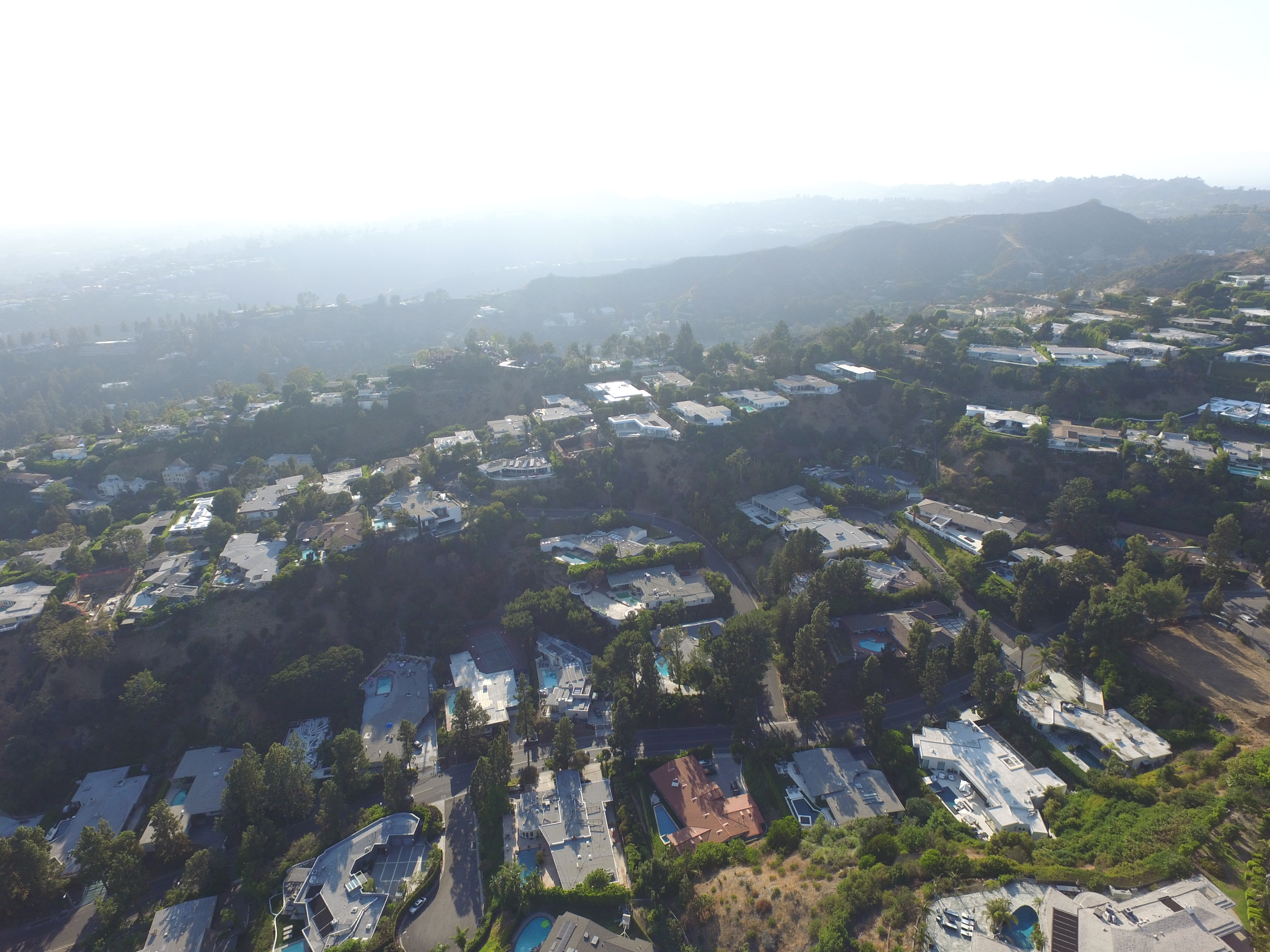
Loma Vista in Trousdale Estates

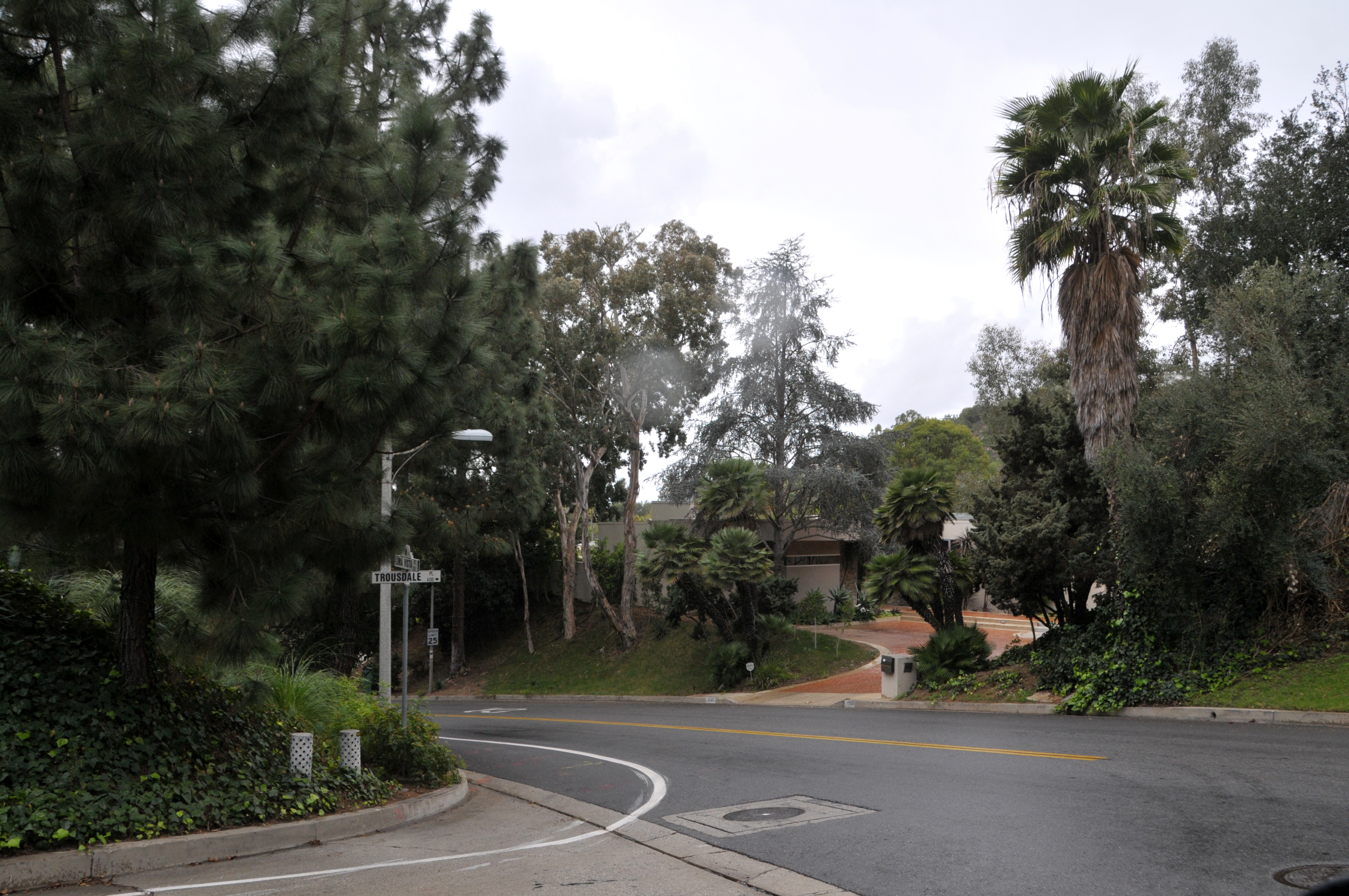
Corner of Trousdale Place and Loma Vista Drive, looking southwest.

== History ==
Trousdale Estates was built on the grounds of the Doheny Estate, home to Greystone Mansion, a 1928 gift from Los Angeles oil magnate Edward L. Doheny to his son Edward L. Doheny, Jr., and family.

In 1954, Paul Trousdale purchased the estate from Doheny, Jr.’s widow, Mrs. Lucy Smith Doheny Battson. The mansion was acquired by industrialist Henry Crown, who later sought to demolish it and subdivide the property; this was forestalled by its purchase by the city of Los Angeles in 1965. Today it is a public park and listed as a United States Historical Site.

Shortly after purchasing the estate, sometimes known as the Doheny Ranch, Trousdale convinced the Beverly Hills City Council to add his planned neighborhood to the city, which it accepted, and he renamed Trousdale Estates.

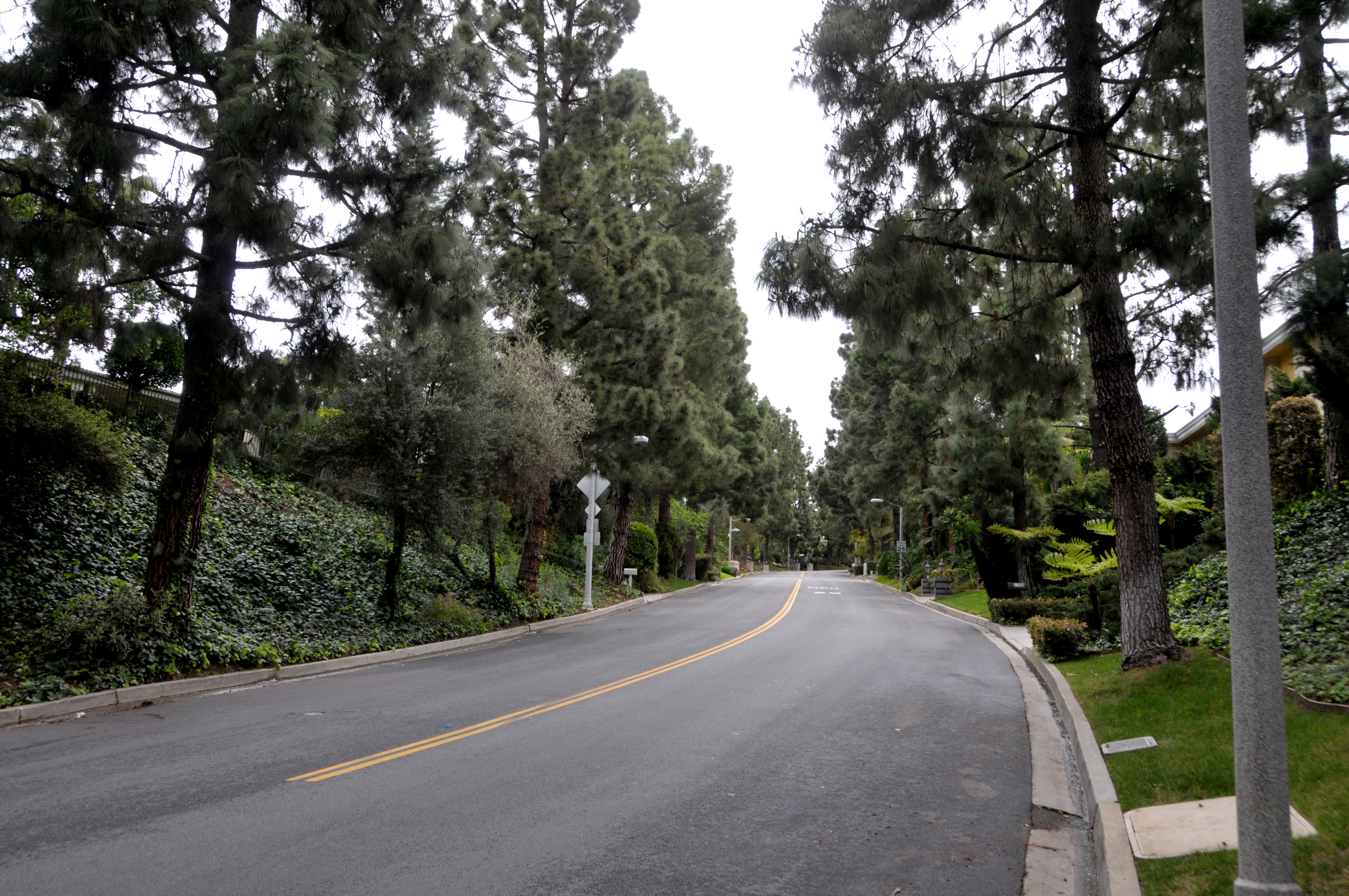
Loma Vista Drive from the corner of Chalette Drive, looking north

Trousdale subdivided the property into 532 lots, all subject to strict regulations devised by the Architectural Committee, including how high roofs could be. Early houses were designed by renowned architects Wallace Neff (1895–1982), Paul R. Williams (1894–1980), A. Quincy Jones (1913–1979), Frank Lloyd Wright (1867–1959) and Harold Levitt (1922–2003). Allen Siple (1900–1973) acted as the supervising architect.

By 1981, some houses had been remodeled, blocking their neighbors' views. As a result, after some consultation in 1987 the Trousdale Estates Homeowners Association, a non-profit organization, and the City of Beverly Hills implemented the Trousdale Ordinance to preserve the neighborhood. There are also "view protections" that protect a resident's view from neighboring trees, outlined in the Trousdale Ordinance. The City of Beverly Hills now enforces these building codes and view protections.

The 410-acre (170 ha) neighborhood has 24/7 security patrol cars with armed guards. In addition, the Beverly Hills Police Department has increased its day and night rounds in the neighborhood with dedicated patrols.

Loma Vista is the main thoroughfare in Trousdale Estates.

== Notable residents ==
Celebrity residents have included Elvis Presley, Frank Sinatra, Dean Martin, Tony Curtis, Ray Charles, Howard Hughes, and Groucho Marx. President Richard Nixon lived in the neighborhood from 1962 to 1963. When Nixon, who had just been Vice President from 1953 to 1961 under President Dwight D. Eisenhower, purchased his residence, Frank McCullogh of the Los Angeles Times reported that he had paid only $90,000 for a $300,000 home, as the developers believed his name would add prestige to the neighborhood.

More recently, Jennifer Aniston, Elton John, David Spade, Vera Wang, Billy Dee Williams, John Rich, Jane Fonda, Richard Perry, Markus Persson, Ringo Starr, Simon Cowell, and Charlie Puth have lived in the neighborhood.

Jeffrey Katzenberg, who co-founded DreamWorks, bought a $35 million, 8,704 square feet (808.6 m^{2}) mansion in Trousdale Estates from Simon Ramo, an American physicist, engineer, and business leader. Katzenberg hosted fundraisers for President Barack Obama at this mansion.

In July 2019, Uber co-founder Garrett Camp and his wife Eliza Nguyen bought an 11,000 square feet (1,000 m^{2}) mansion for $72.5 million in Trousdale Estates.

In August 2021, Cindy Crawford and Rande Gerber sold their home in Trousdale Estates for a reported $13.5 million.

In February 2022, David Spade sold his home in Trousdale Estates for a reported $19.5 million.

== In popular culture ==
Trousdale Estates plays a role in Seasons Two and Three of the Showtime TV series Ray Donovan, whose namesake attempts to buy a $4 million house there to "move up" from nearby Calabasas.
