= William Gage =

William Gage may refer to:

== People ==
- William Gage (15th-century landowner) (1447–1497)
- Sir William Gage, 2nd Baronet (c. 1650–1727)
- Sir William Gage, 7th Baronet (1695–1744), MP for Seaford from 1727 until his death
- William Gage, 2nd Viscount Gage (1718–1791), equerry to the Prince of Wales and Member of Parliament
- William Hall Gage (1777–1864), Second Sea Lord and Admiral of the Fleet in the British Navy
- William James Gage (1849–1921), Canadian publisher and philanthropist
- William J. Gage (1891–1965), American architect, designed Beverly Hills City Hall
- Sir William Gage (judge) (1938–2023), UK Lord Justice of Appeal

== Other ==
- Sir William Gage Middle School, in Brampton, Ontario, Canada
