= Eleanor Ettinger Gallery =

Private gallery in SoHo, Manhattan

Coordinates: 40.72384°N 74.00006°W

The Eleanor Ettinger Gallery was a private art gallery in SoHo, Manhattan. The gallery was founded in 1975 by Eleanor Ettinger. The gallery had started as a home for fine art lithography, with Norman Rockwell as the first artist to host an exhibition there.

Notable artists that were exhibited at the Eleanor Ettinger Gallery included Malcolm T. Liepke, Alice Neel, and R. Kenton Nelson.

The Eleanor Ettinger Gallery was later owned and run by Eleanor Ettinger's daughter, Frann Bradford, and Frann's husband James Umphlett. They had an interest in realism, and representational and contemporary art, and this was reflected in the work exhibited during their time running the gallery. In July 2010, they decided to move the gallery out of SoHo, and opened new two locations in Midtown on 57th Street and in Chelsea on 25th Street.

The Eleanor Ettinger Gallery closed in 2013.
