= Paley Center for Media =

American museum of broadcasting

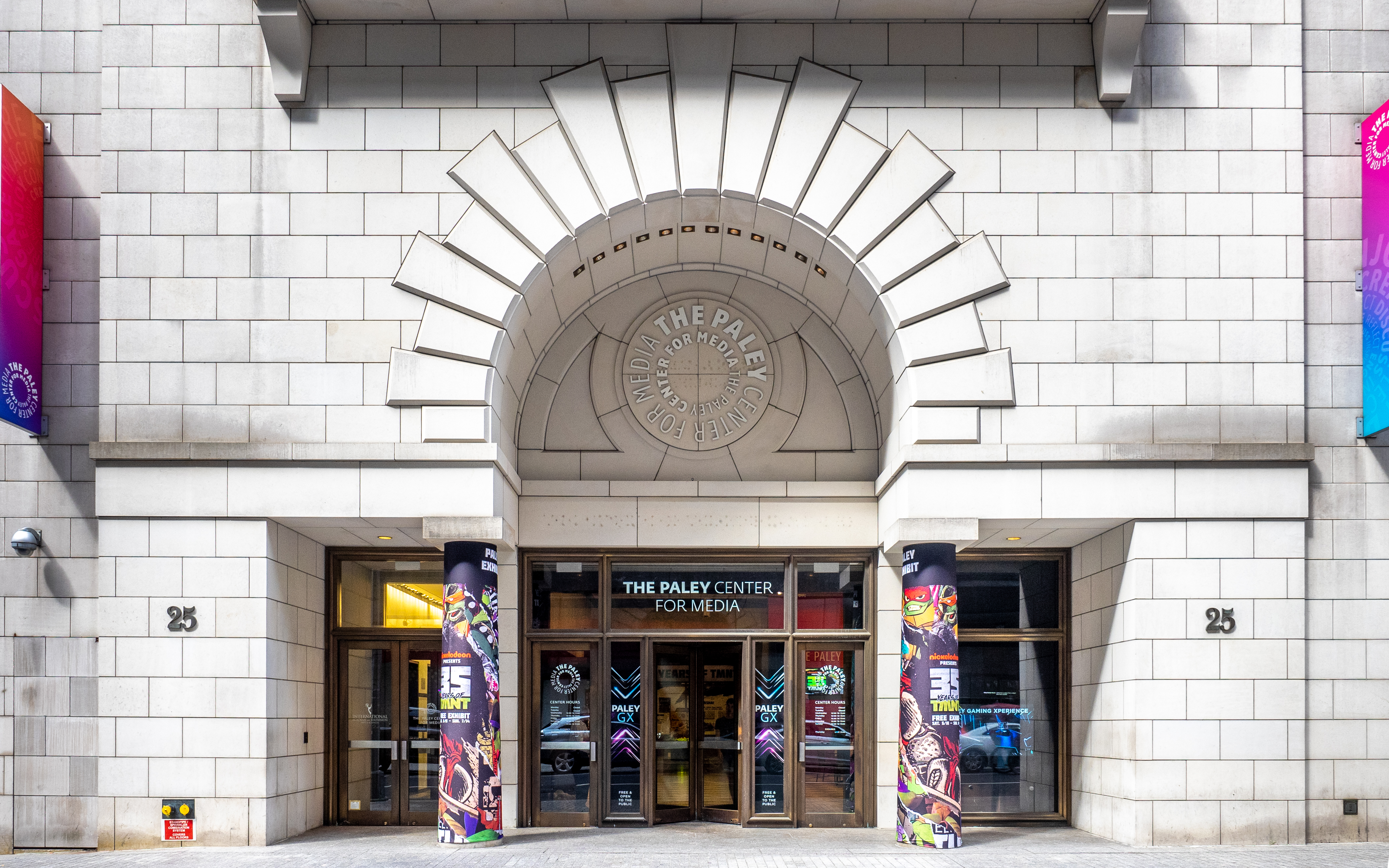
- The Paley Center for Media entrance
- Former name: Museum of Television & Radio (MT&R); Museum of Broadcasting
- Established: 1975
- Location: 25 West 52nd Street, Midtown Manhattan, New York City
- Coordinates: 40°45′38″N 73°58′39″W
- Type: Media Museum
- Founder: William S. Paley
- Website: paleycenter.org

The Paley Center for Media, formerly the Museum of Television & Radio (MT&R) and the Museum of Broadcasting, founded in 1975 by CBS founder William S. Paley, is an American cultural institution headquartered in New York City with a branch office in Los Angeles. It is dedicated to the discussion of the cultural, creative, and social significance of television, radio, and emerging platforms for the professional community and media-interested public.

It was renamed the Paley Center for Media on June 5, 2007, to encompass emerging broadcasting technologies such as the Internet, mobile video, and podcasting, as well as to expand its role as a neutral setting where media professionals can engage in discussion and debate about the evolving media landscape.

== Locations ==
=== New York ===
In 1975 the original Museum of Broadcasting was founded with a gift by William S. Paley of US$2 million (equivalent to $12 million in 2025). It opened on November 9, 1976, occupying two floors in an office building at 1 East 53rd Street, adjacent to Paley Park near the corner of 53rd Street and Fifth Avenue in Midtown Manhattan. In 1991 the museum changed its name to the Museum of Television & Radio with a move into the William S. Paley Building. The 16-story building was designed by Philip Johnson and located at 25 West 52nd Street (adjacent to the famed 21 Club at 21 West 52nd Street). The museum was renamed the Paley Center for Media in 2007.

=== Los Angeles ===
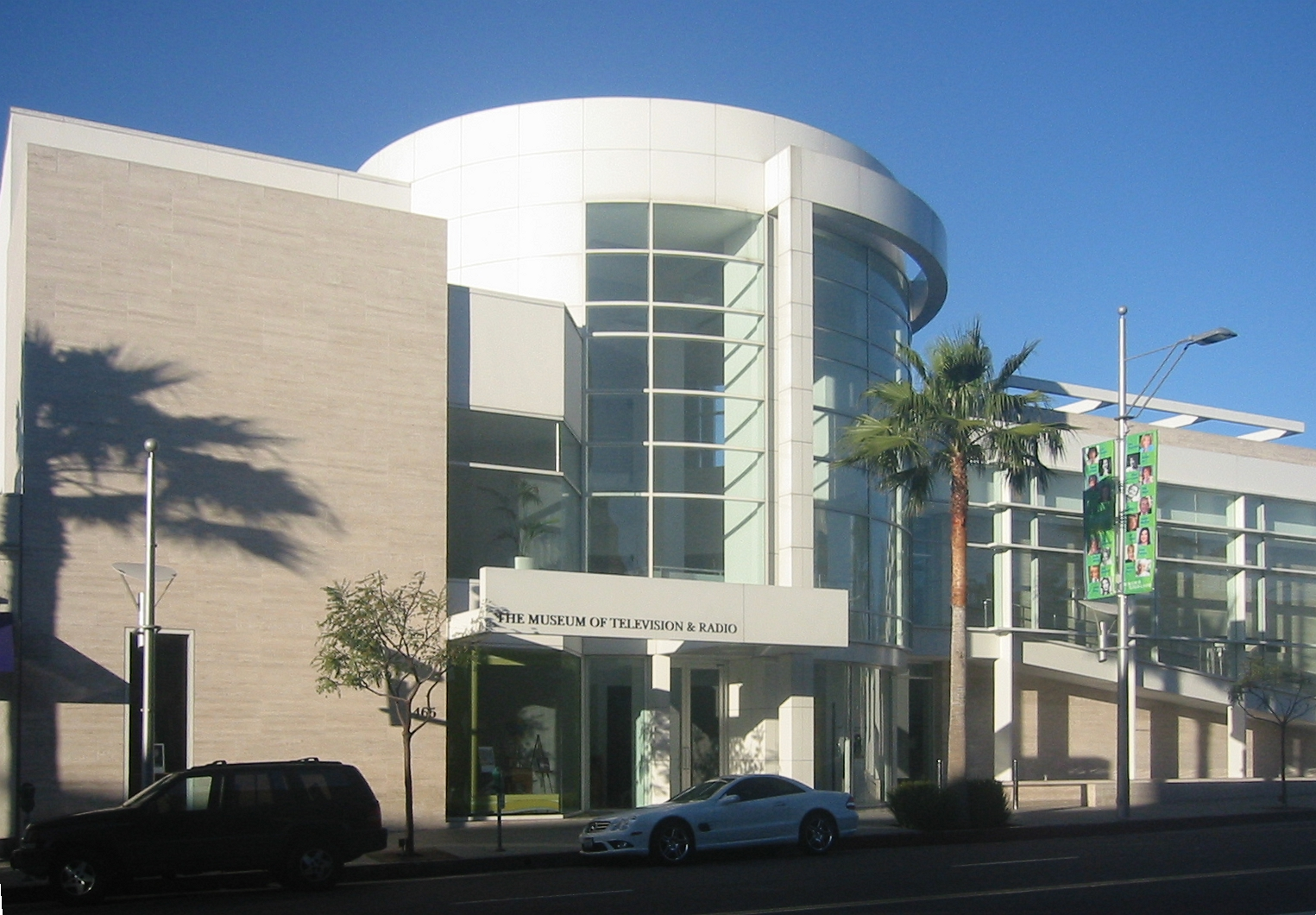
The Paley Center for Media in Beverly Hills closed in 2020

In 1996 the Museum of Television & Radio in Los Angeles opened in a new building, located at 465 North Beverly Drive in Beverly Hills, designed by Richard Meier. In early 2020, the museum at North Beverly Drive closed and a move of the archives to the Beverly Hills Public Library was announced, with the staff moving to an office in Century City. The new archive officially opened in March 2025 after delays.

== Archives ==
The Paley Center for Media is committed to the idea that many television and radio programs are significant works and should be preserved for posterity's sake. Instead of collecting artifacts and memorabilia, the Paley Center comprises mostly screening rooms, including two full-sized theaters. Nearly 160,000 television shows, commercials, and radio programs are available in the Paley Center's library, and during each visit, viewers can select and watch shows at individual consoles, and radio programs are accessed through these same consoles.

Some television programs are from the 1940s with radio programs dating back to the 1920s. The earliest TV program in the museum's collection is a silent film of NBC's 1939 production of Dion Boucicault's melodrama The Streets of New York (1857), with Norman Lloyd, George Coulouris, and Jennifer Jones.

The museum does not sell the material or permit it to leave the premises. Viewing copies of television programs are Hi-8mm video tape dubs. The originals are kept in a vault outside of New York City, and the collection is being digitized. The Paley Center has acquired many lost episodes of classic television shows and has produced documentary features about the history and impact of television and radio. In recent years, the center has sponsored advance viewing of the pilot episodes of each network's new programs.

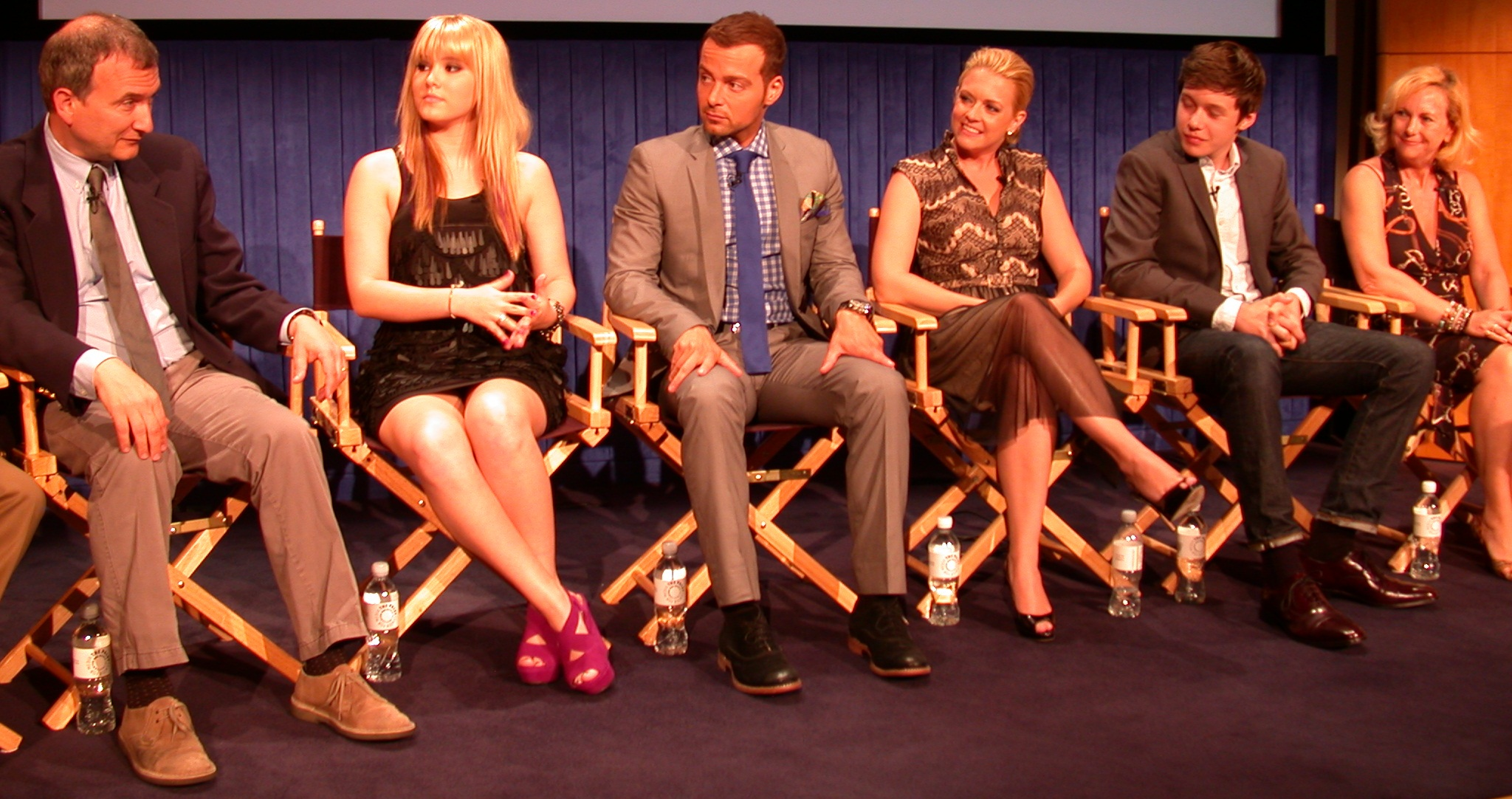
The cast and crew of Melissa & Joey at an "Onstage @ Paley LA" event

Television and radio shows are added to the collection after archival discoveries and through donations from individuals and organizations. In 2002, the museum held a showing of the previously unseen rehearsal film of Rodgers and Hammerstein's Cinderella telecast from March 17, 1957. This rehearsal was found in the CBS vault while the museum was on a quest for other "lost" Cinderella materials. It had been believed that on the night of the live broadcast the show was preserved on both kinescope and videotape and then transmitted to the West Coast. Seeking either of these, Jane Klain, the director of research at the New York facility, asked CBS to search their vaults. The CBS database listed three 16mm films featuring five-minute segments of Julie Andrews performing in the show. When the earliest one was brought from the CBS vault, it was discovered to be the full dress rehearsal.

The center is also known for its many discoveries involving daytime game shows. Episodes of destroyed shows such as High Rollers, Celebrity Sweepstakes, The Money Maze, the Chuck Woolery version of Wheel of Fortune, To Say the Least, and daytime Hollywood Squares episodes are all available for viewing in the library. Episodes of other game shows like Tattletales, Let's Make a Deal, and The Gong Show are in the library.

== Programming and education ==
The Paley Center regularly conducts seminars and interviews with public figures. Past seminar participants have included Lucille Ball, Carol Burnett, Dick Cavett, Alan Alda, Al Franken, Steven Kunes, John Frankenheimer, James Garner, Bob Hope, Roy Huggins, Jack Paar, Dennis Potter, Dick Van Dyke, and Gore Vidal. Also available for viewing are seminars featuring creators and cast members from TV shows, including The Larry Sanders Show, Seinfeld, King of the Hill, The Simpsons, South Park, The Daily Show with Jon Stewart, Arrested Development, House, Battlestar Galactica, and The League.

The William S. Paley Television Festival, also known as PaleyFest, is an annual television festival hosted by the Paley Center in Los Angeles. Founded in 1984, the festival, held annually in the spring, features panels composed of the casts and prominent creative talent from Community, Parks and Recreation, Mad Men, and Lost, among other shows. The panels field questions from a moderator and a public audience; they present exclusive content from their respective series. The festival has been in many venues over its history, including the Los Angeles County Museum of Art Bing Theater, the Directors Guild of America theater, the Cinerama Dome, and the Saban Theatre in Beverly Hills. It was moved to the larger Dolby Theatre in Hollywood in 2014. An annual Paleyfest New York event in the fall began in 2013.

== See also ==
- Museum of Broadcast Communications
- Pavek Museum of Broadcasting
- Radio Hall of Fame
- List of museums and cultural institutions in New York City
- List of old-time radio people
- List of old-time radio programs
- List of U.S. radio programs
