= Beverly Hills City Hall =

Coordinates: 34.0729°N 118.4005°W

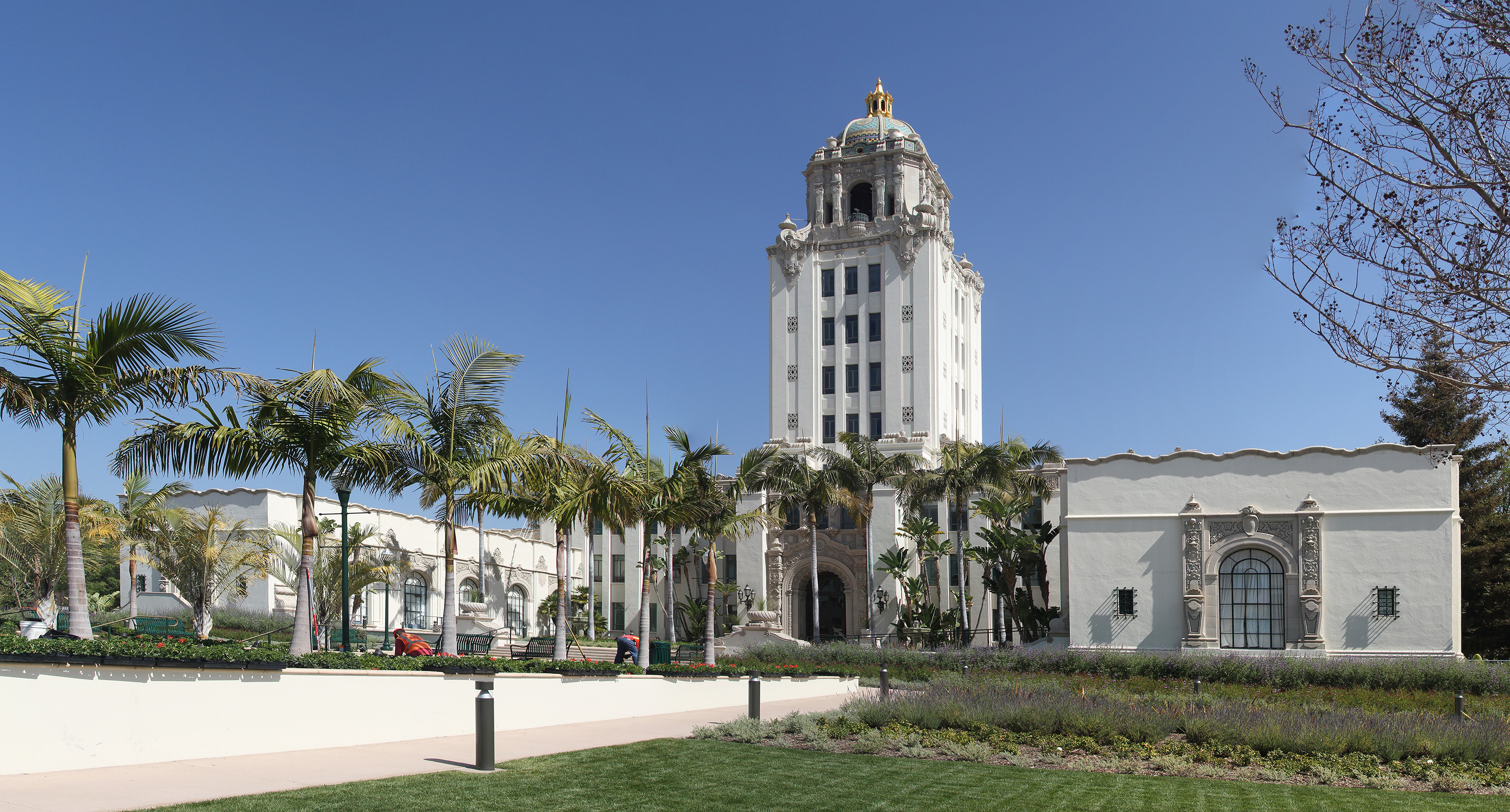

General information
- Type: City hall
- Architectural style: California Churrigueresque
- Location: 455 North Rexford Drive, Beverly Hills, California, 90210
- Completed: 1932
- Renovated: 1982; 2008

Design and construction
- Architects: William J. Gage, Harry G. Koerner

The Beverly Hills City Hall is a historic building and city hall in Beverly Hills, California, United States.

The building houses the city administration, including the office of the Mayor of Beverly Hills and board meetings of the Beverly Hills City Council. Additionally, it houses the Municipal Gallery, an evolving art space designed by interior designer Gere Kavanaugh.

Inside the building, a sculpture by Auguste Rodin called Torso of a Walking Man can be seen.

In May 2013, the Beverly Hills City Council voted to add the building to the city's historic register.

== History ==
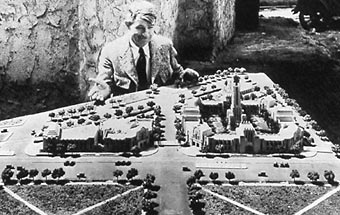
Actor Will Rogers with a 1934 model of the City Hall development proposal

In the 1910s and 1920s, before this building was constructed, city administration services took place at the Beverly Hills Hotel. However, in 1925, a two-storey building was erected on Burton Way to serve as a city hall and fire department building. Yet five years later, a petition signed by 2,000 residents which was presented to the Beverly Hills City Council called for a new building in a new location.

Thus, in 1930, land was purchased from the Pacific Electric to build the city hall. Construction lasted from 1931 to 1932. The building was designed by architects William J. Gage and Harry G. Koerner in the California Churrigueresque style, a type of Spanish Revival architecture. The building was constructed by the Herbert M. Baruch Corporation. When the city hall opened in 1932, it was called by the Los Angeles Times the "largest and most expensive City Hall of any municipality its size in the country."

The building was renovated in 1982. Additionally, it was expanded from 49,000 to 67,000 square feet. Moreover, the ground-floor reception area was renovated in 2008, when the main entrance was moved from North Crescent Drive to North Rexford Drive.

The building appears in the movie In a Lonely Place (dir. Nicholas Ray, 1950). It is also used as the police department building in Beverly Hills Cop (dir. Martin Brest, 1984).

For the Beverly Hills centennial in 2014, a 15,000-slice cake in the shape of the Beverly Hills City Hall was designed by chef Donald Wressell of the Guittard Chocolate Company and decorated by Rosselle and Marina Sousa. It cost US$200,000 to make.

As part of the Beverly Hills Centennial Arts of Palm Installation, sculptor Brad Howe designed four sculptures outside the City Hall. According to The Beverly Hills Courier, it is "the largest short-term public art installation ever to be held in Beverly Hills."

In the midst of the 2015 drought, the city government replaced the grass in front of the city hall with Mexican sage to reduce their water consumption.

== Location ==
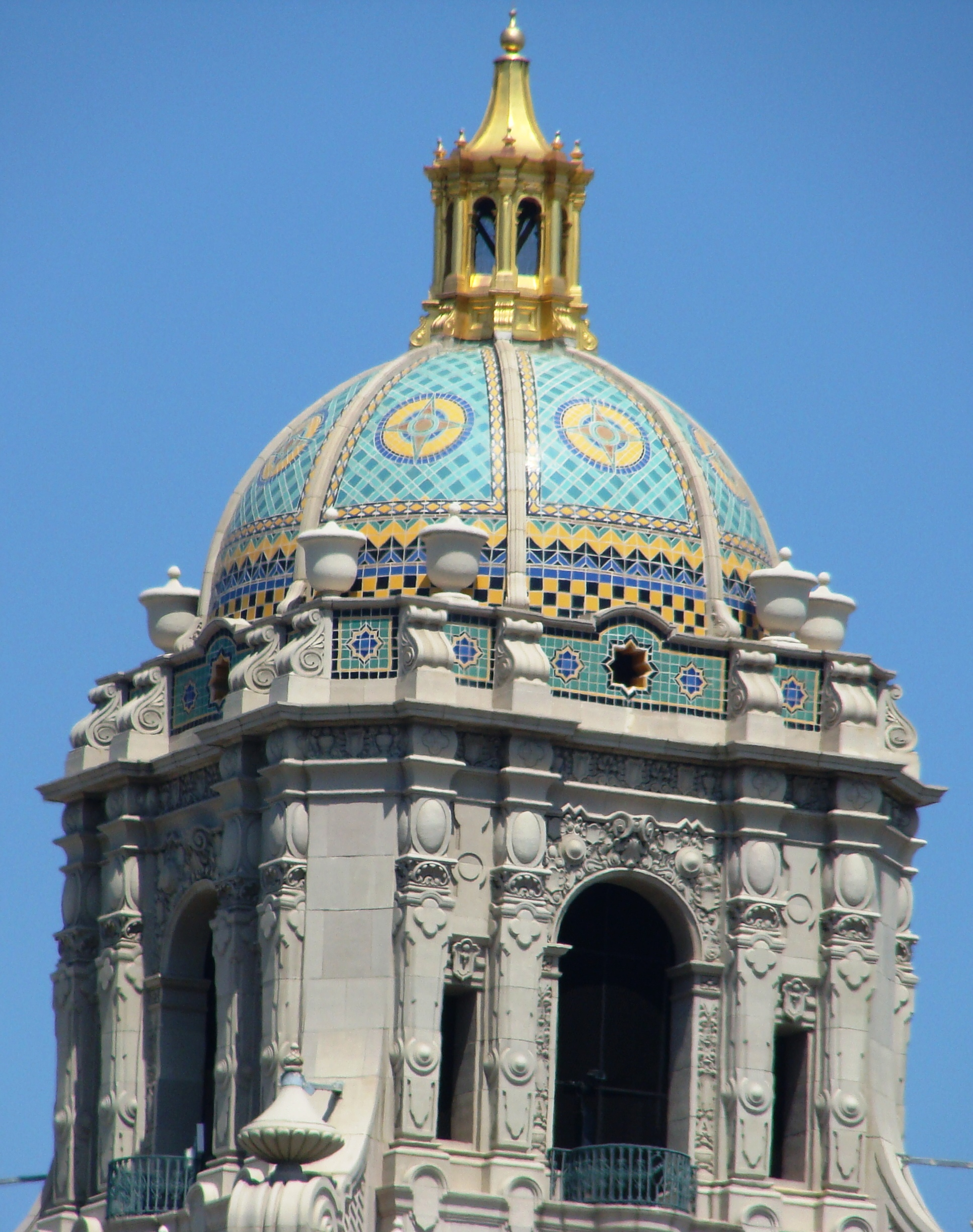
Close-up of the cupola

The building is surrounded by North Santa Monica Boulevard, North Rexford Drive, South Santa Monica Boulevard, and North Crescent Drive. Its main entrance is at 455 North Rexford Drive, which faces the Beverly Hills Public Library, adjacent to the Beverly Hills Police Department. A few doors below on North Rexford Drive is the Beverly Hills Fire Department, next to the Beverly Hills 9/11 Memorial Garden. Behind it, on South Santa Monica Boulevard, is the Beverly Hills Civic Center.

== Gallery ==
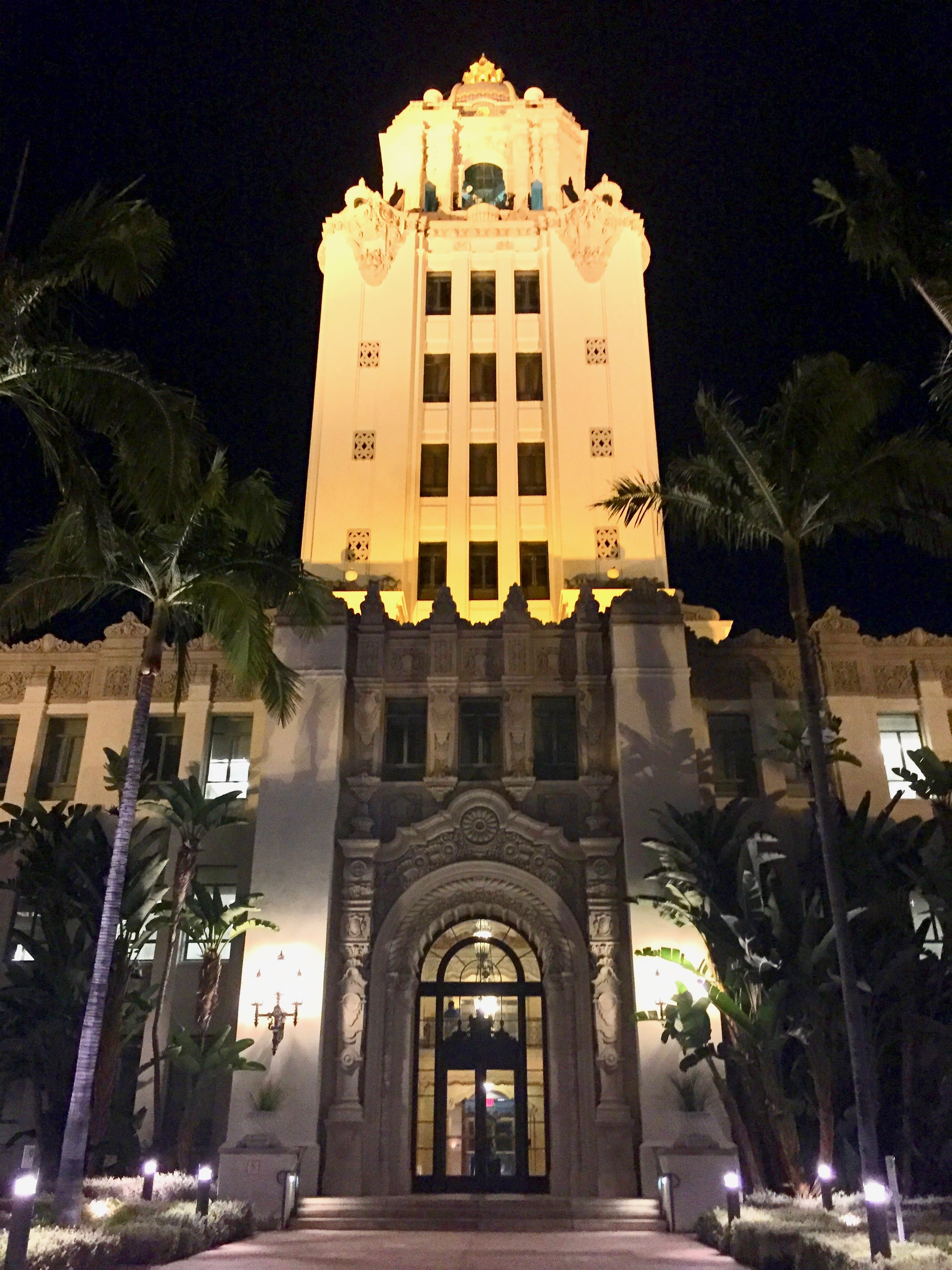
Beverly Hills City Hall at night.

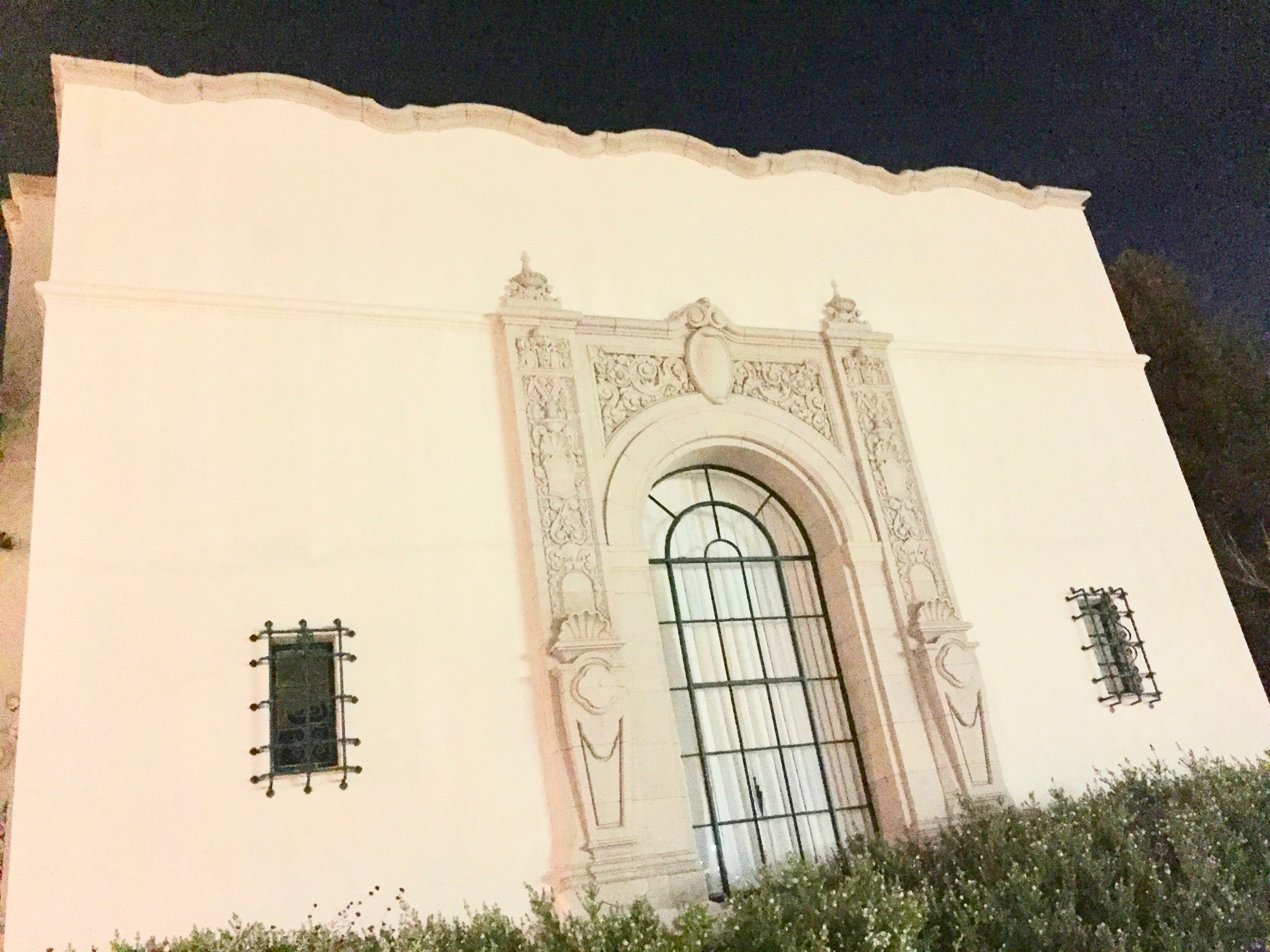
Ornate window surround.

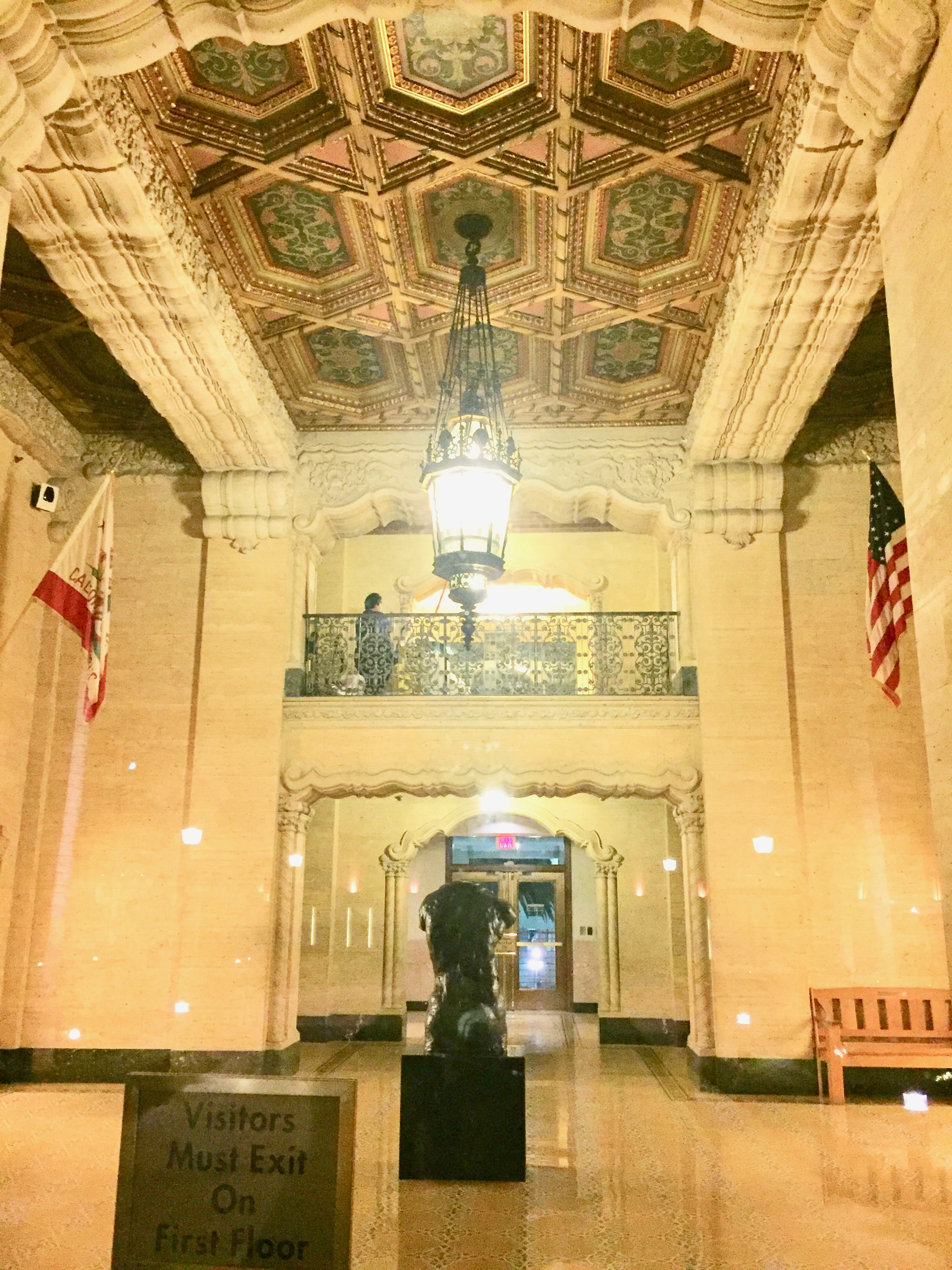
Interior of City Hall.

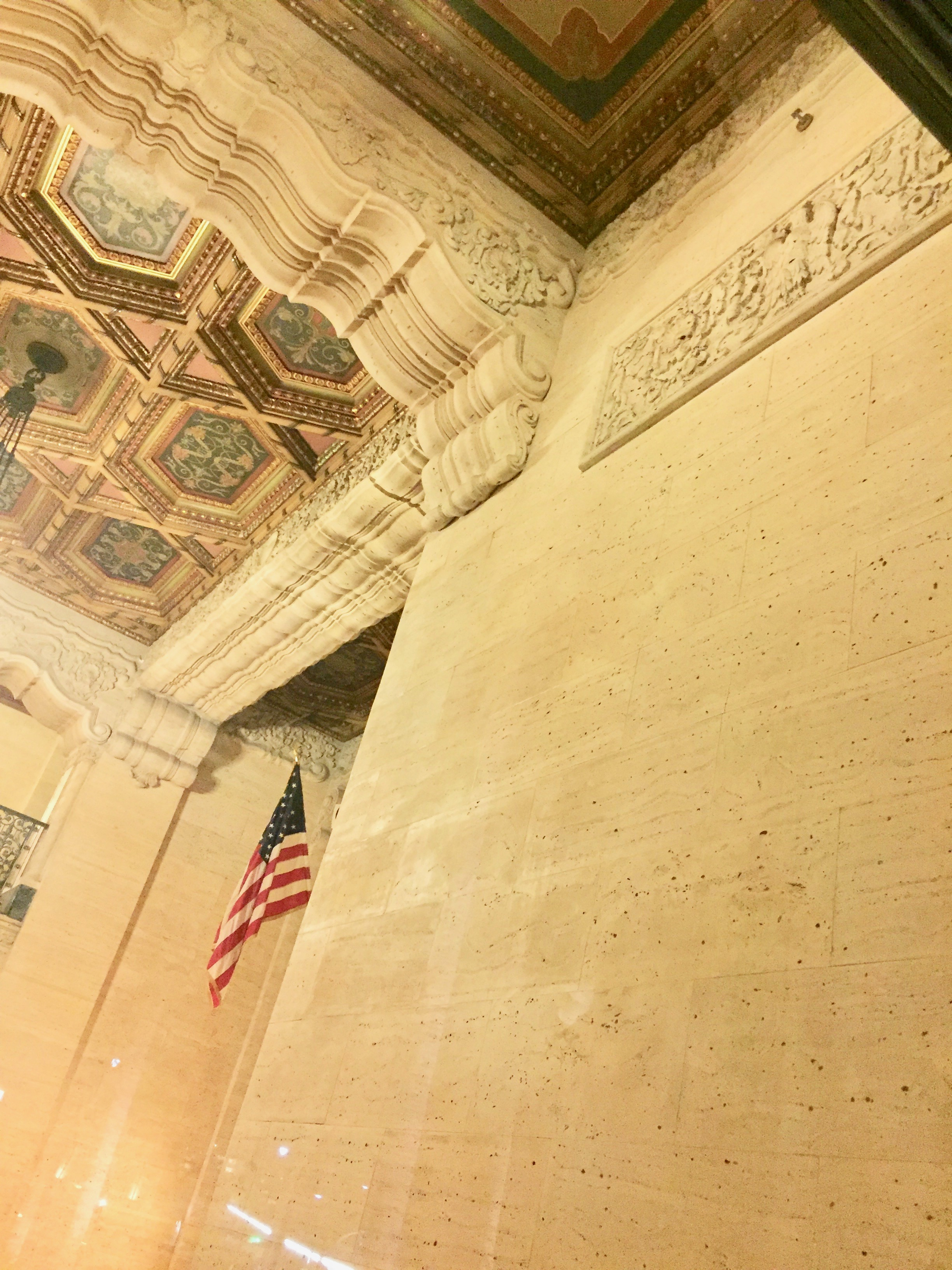
Ornate stonework and painted coffered ceiling.

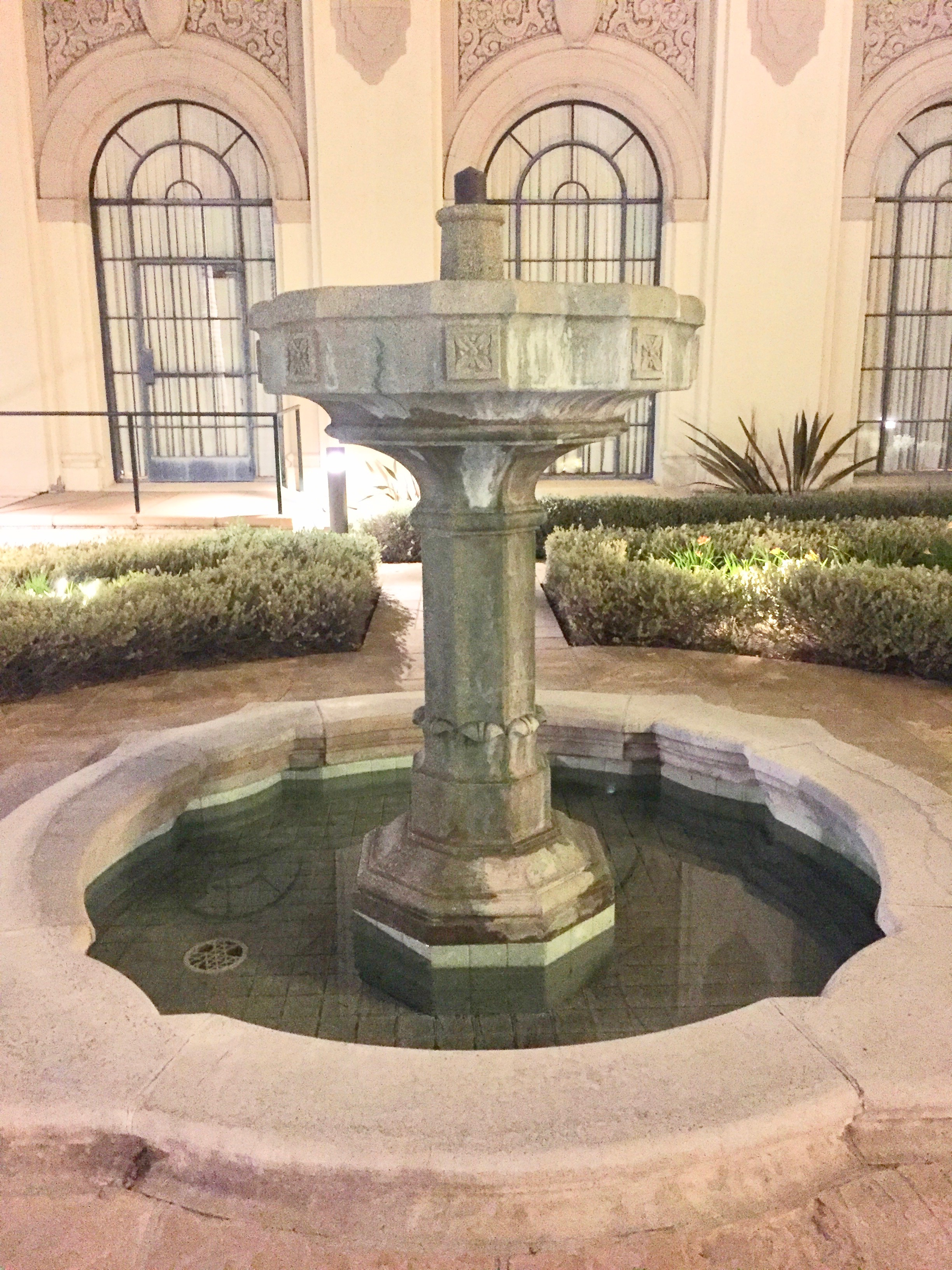
Another view of the fountain.

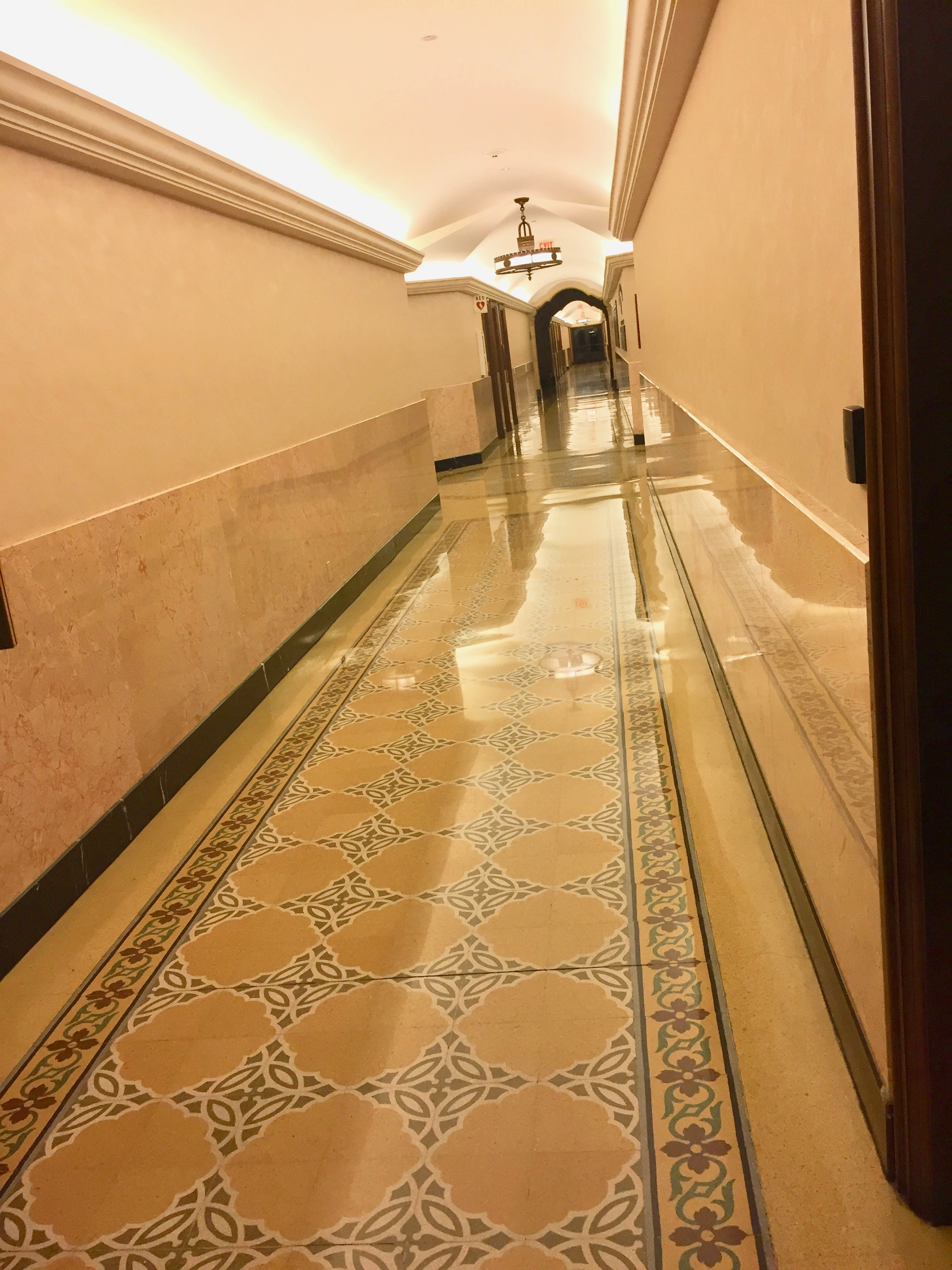
A corridor of Beverly Hills City Hall.

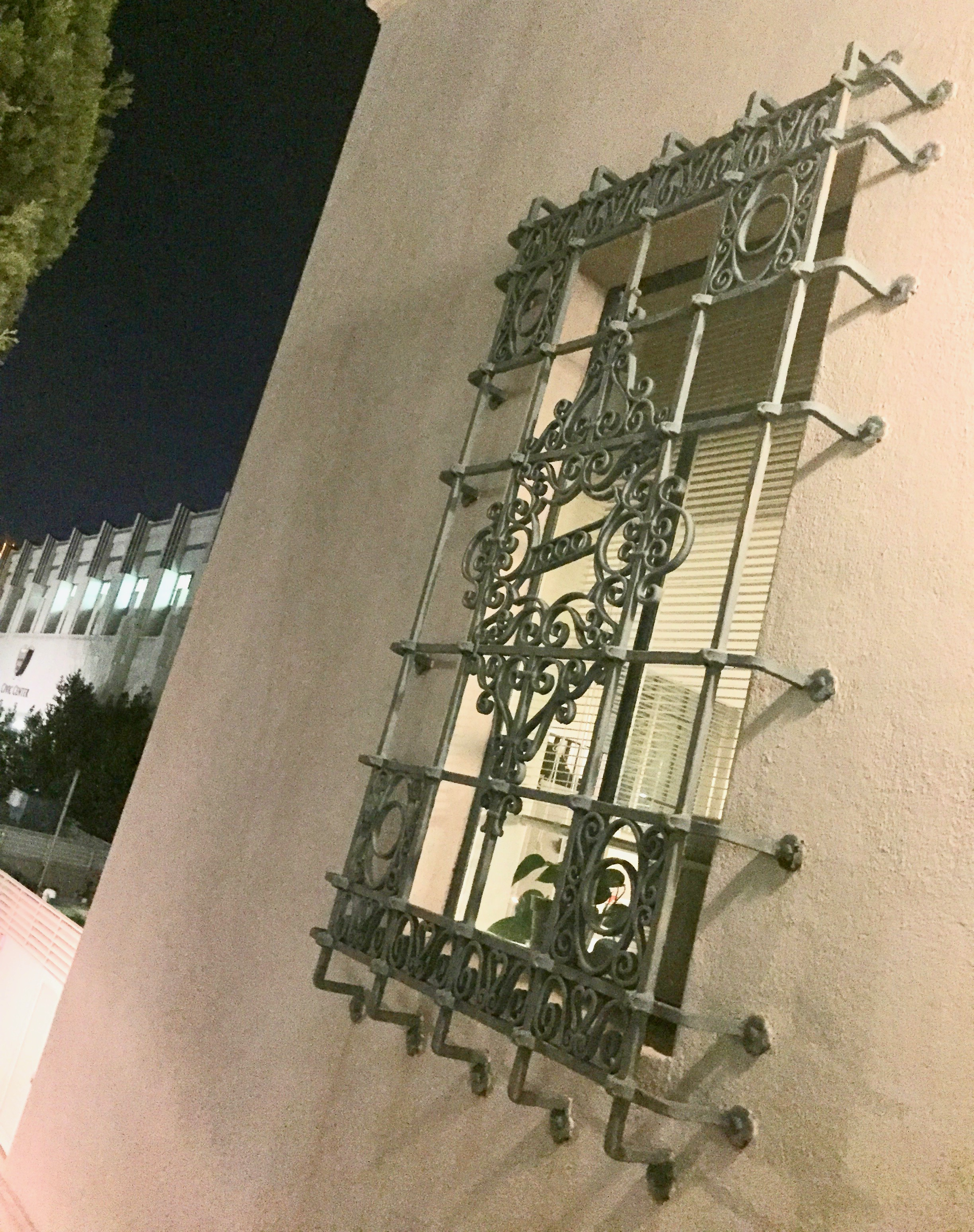
A window grill at City Hall.
