= Beverly Hills Civic Center =

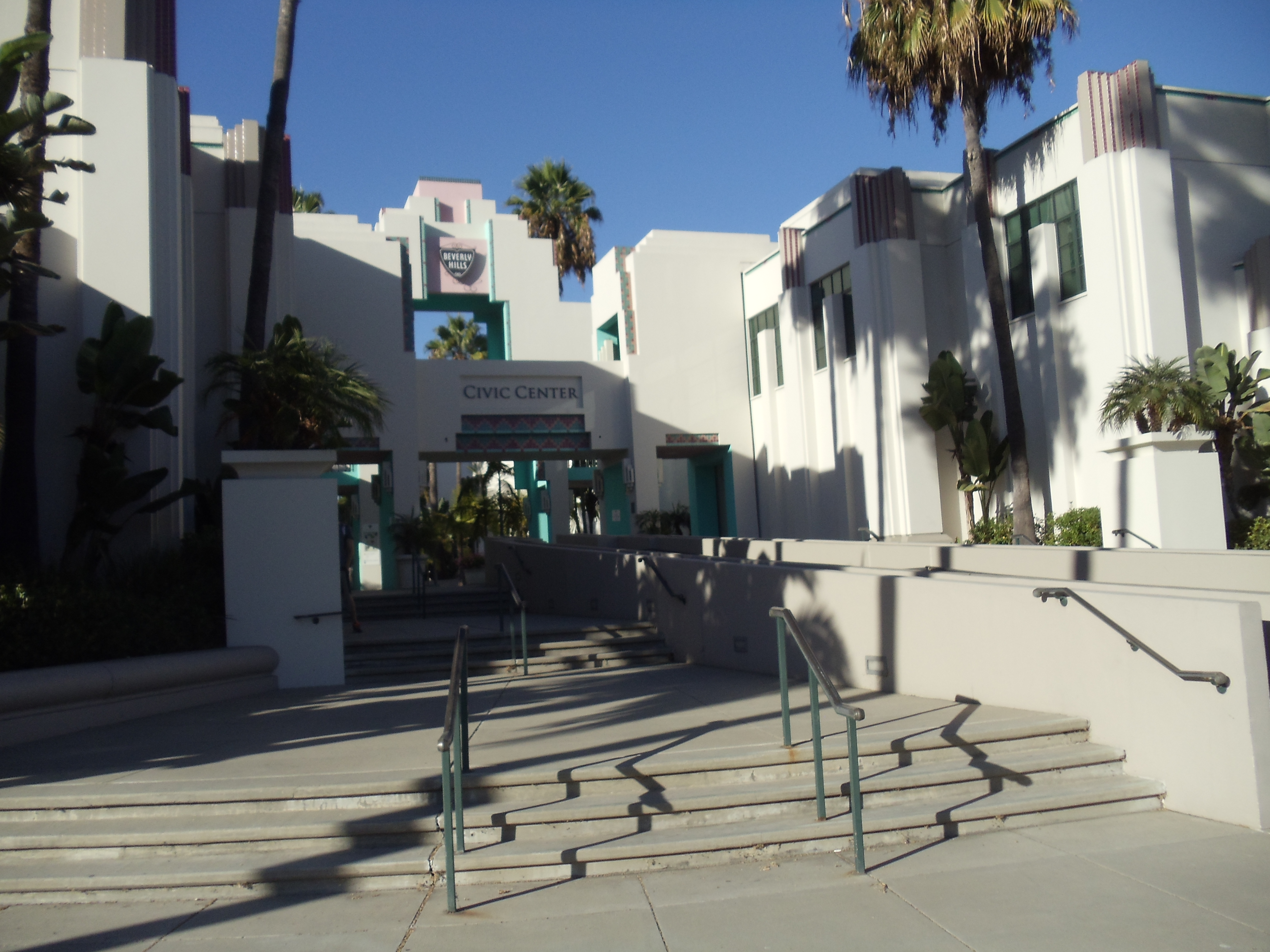
- Entrance of Beverly Hills Civic Center
- Interactive map of the Beverly Hills Civic Center area

General information
- Type: Civic center
- Architectural style: Hybrid: Spanish Revival, Art Deco and Post-Modern
- Location: 455 North Rexford Drive, Beverly Hills, California, 90210
- Coordinates: 34°4′24.76″N 118°23′57.65″W
- Completed: 1990

Design and construction
- Architect: Charles Moore

The Beverly Hills Civic Center is a landmark building serving as a civic center in Beverly Hills, California.

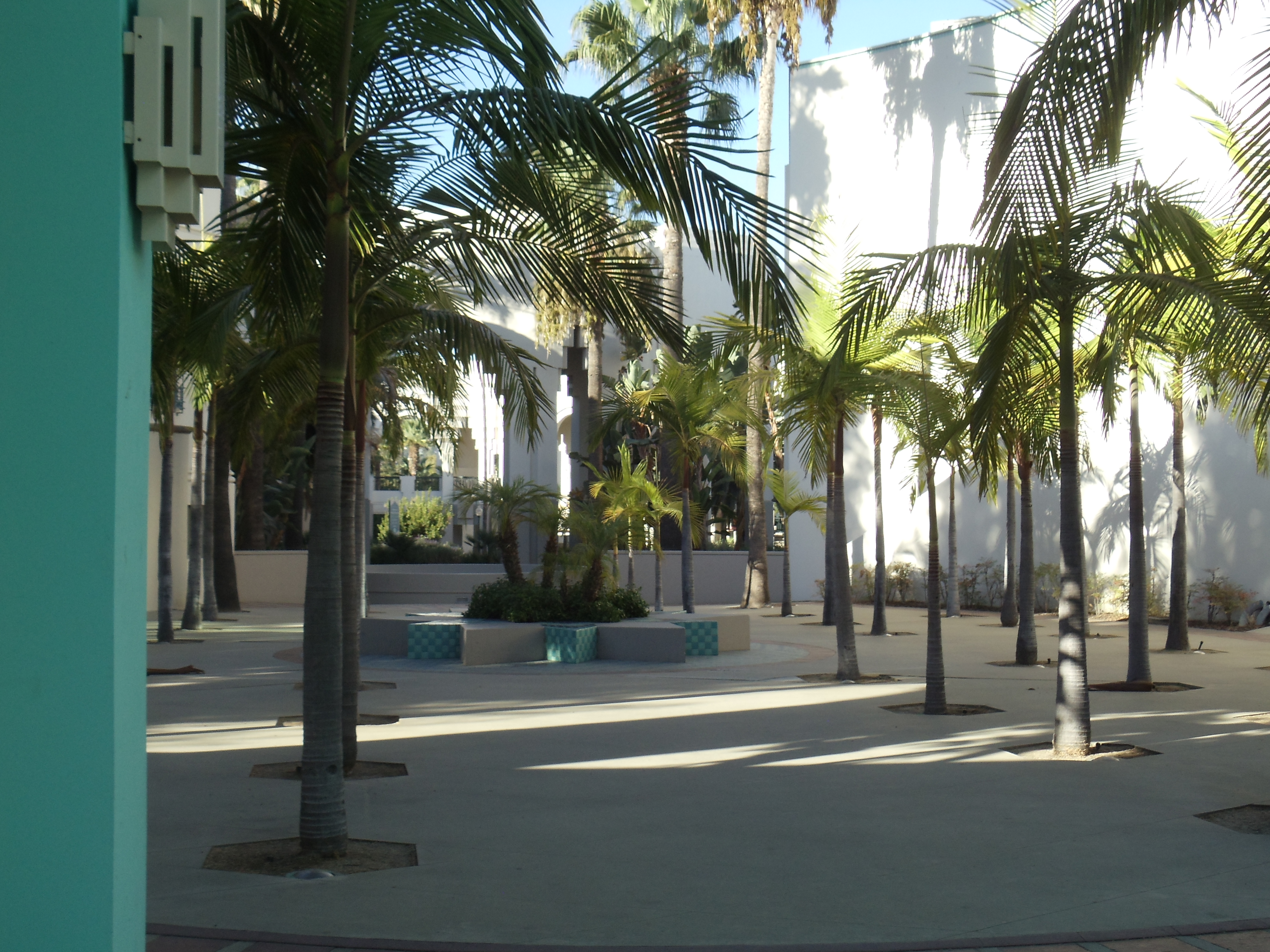
Palm Court inside the Beverly Hills Civic Center

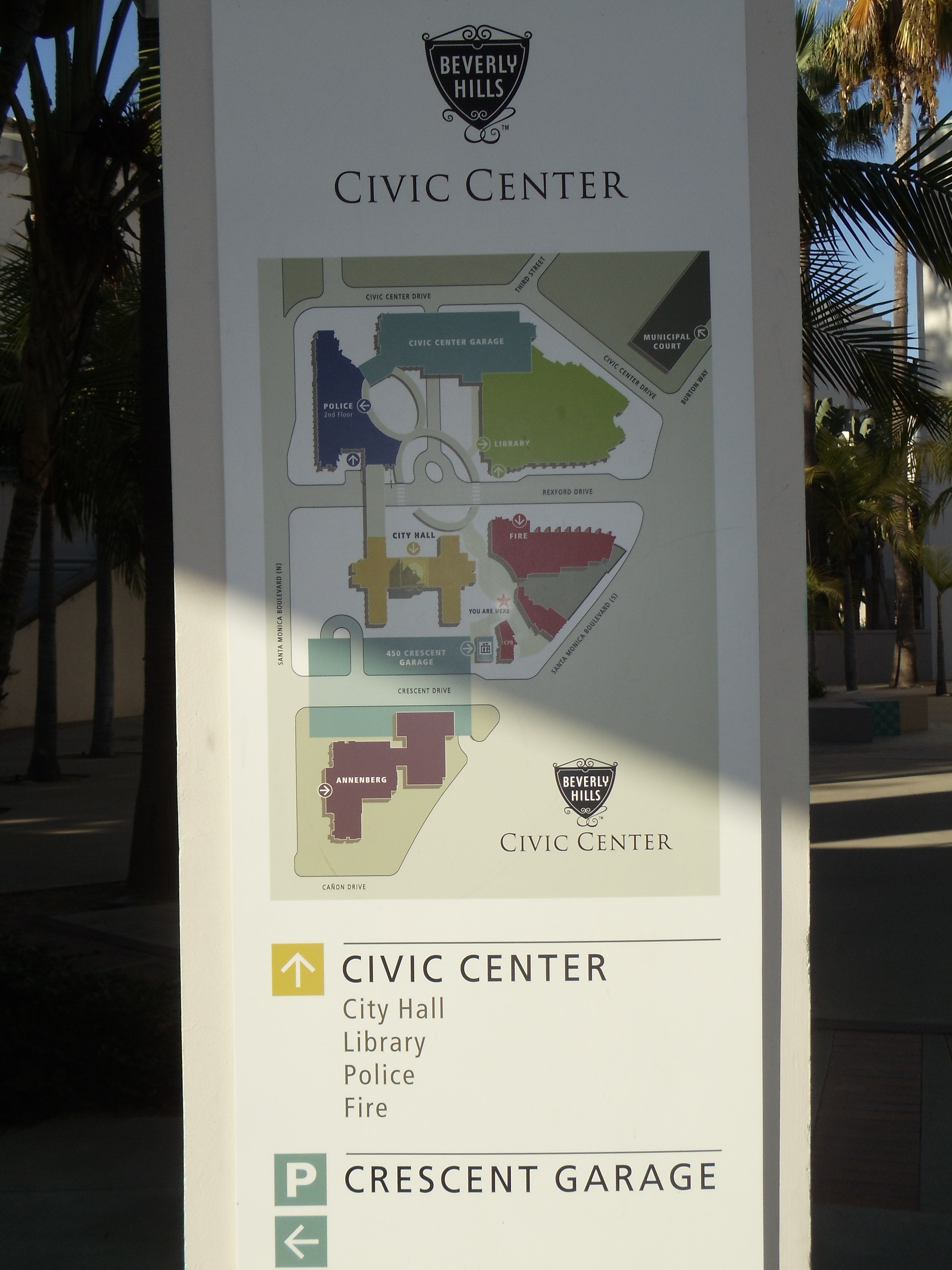
Map of the Beverly Hills Civic Center

== Location ==
The Beverly Hills Civic Center stands at 455 North Rexford Drive in Beverly Hills, California.

== History ==
In 1982, as the adjacent Beverly Hills City Hall was being renovated, the project to build this civic center was put forward.

The building was designed by Charles Moore (1925–1993). Drawing upon the Spanish Revival architecture of the city hall, Moore designed this building in a mixture of Spanish Revival, Art Deco and Post-Modern styles. It includes courtyards, colonnades, promenades, and buildings, with both open and semi-enclosed spaces, stairways and balconies. It was completed in 1990.

As part of the Beverly Hills Centennial Arts of Palm Installation in 2014, the Palm Court of the Civic Center displayed a temporary mosaic mural by R. Kenton Nelson and an art piece by Michael C. McMillen.

== Secondary source ==
- Robin E. Johnson, The Beverly Hills Civic Center by Charles Moore: The Semiotics of Wealth and Power, California State University, Northridge, 1992, 376 pages.
