= Michael C. McMillen =

American artist

- Born: 1946 (age 79–80); Los Angeles, California
- Education: UCLA
- Occupation: Artist

Michael C. McMillen (born 1946) is a sculptor, installation artist, and short filmmaker from Los Angeles, California.

== Biography ==
=== Early life ===
Michael C. McMillen was born in 1946 in Los Angeles, California. He first received a bachelor's degree at California State University, Northridge (where he was taught by Hans Burkhardt) and received a master's degree, followed by a Master of Fine Arts degree from UCLA.

=== Career ===
He started his career by building props for movies, where he worked in the 1970s and 1980s. At the same time, he embarked upon a vocation as an artist. He won the New Talent Award from the LACMA in 1978.

As an artist, his work includes sculptures, art installations, and short films. At Fillmore station on the Los Angeles Metro Rail system in Pasadena, California, he created an art piece called 'Geologica 42'. He founded the Aero Pacific Research, where he serves as Director.

His work is in the permanent collections of the Los Angeles County Museum of Art (LACMA) in Los Angeles, the Oakland Museum of California in Oakland, California, the Laguna Art Museum in Laguna Beach, California, the San Jose Museum of Art in San Jose, California, the Solomon R. Guggenheim Museum in New York City, as well as the Australian National Gallery in Canberra and the Art Gallery of New South Wales in Sydney, Australia. It has also been exhibited at the Whitney Museum of American Art in New York City, the Barry Whistler Gallery in Dallas, Texas, and the de Saisset Museum.

As part of the Beverly Hills Centennial Arts of Palm Installation, he created an art piece for the rotunda of the Palm Court of the Beverly Hills Civic Center between Crescent Drive and Rexford Drive in Beverly Hills, California. Michael C. McMillen is a 2015 John Simon Guggenheim Fellow

=== Personal life ===
He resides in Santa Monica, California.
