= Harry G. Koerner =

American architect (c. 1881–1935)

- Born: c. 1881
- Died: February 27, 1935; Los Angeles, California, U.S.
- Occupation: Architect

Harry G. Koerner (c. 1881 – February 27, 1935) was an American architect. He designed many buildings in Los Angeles County, California, especially in Beverly Hills, including the Beverly Hills City Hall, the Beverly Hills Fire Department and the Beverly Hills Pacific Electric Station.

== Life ==
Koerner was born in c. 1881.

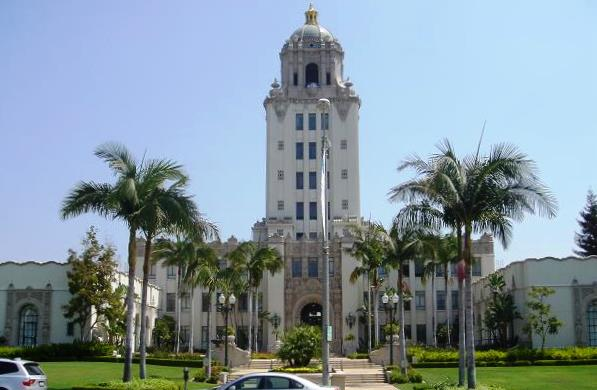
The Beverly Hills City Hall, designed by Koerner and Gage.

Koerner began his career in Pittsburgh, Pennsylvania, where he worked alongside architect Sidney F. Hecker.

Koerner moved to California, where he designed private residences and government buildings in Los Angeles County, especially in Beverly Hills. With William J. Gage, they designed a seven-bedroom house in the Renaissance Revival style in Beverly Hills in the mid-1920s. The two men designed the Beverly Hills City Hall in the Spanish Colonial Revival style in 1931, and they attended its dedication in April 1932. Koerner also designed the Beverly Hills Fire Department building and the Pacific Electric Railway's Beverly Hills station.

Koerner never married, and he was a member of the Masonic Lodge No. 528 in Beverly Hills. He resided at 1462 South Wooster Street in Pico-Robertson. He died on February 27, 1935, in Los Angeles.
