= R. Kenton Nelson =

Kenton Nelson
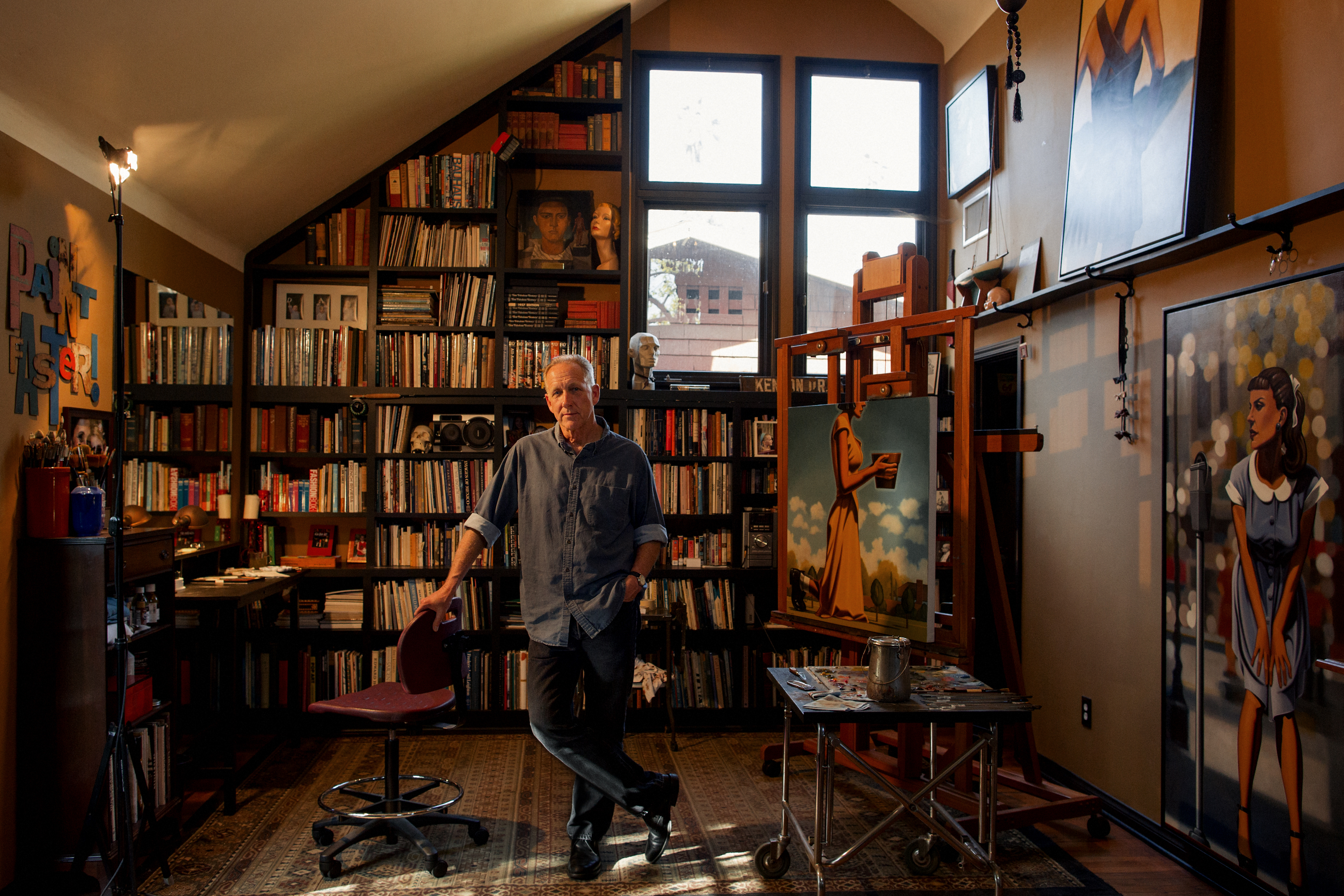
- Nelson in his studio, 2014 photograph by Erwin Darmali
- Born: 1954 (age 71–72); Pasadena, California
- Education: California State University, Long Beach; Otis College of Art and Design
- Occupations: Painter, muralist, illustrator, art teacher
- Relatives: Roberto Montenegro (great-uncle)

R. Kenton Nelson (born 1954) is an American painter and contemporary artist from California.

== Biography ==
=== Early life ===
R. Kenton Nelson, now known as Kenton Nelson, was born in 1954 in Pasadena, California. His great-uncle, whom he was named after, was Roberto Montenegro, a Mexican muralist who was friends with Diego Rivera and Frida Kahlo (who married in his garden). His father worked at General Motors and his mother was a housewife. He graduated from the California State University, Long Beach in Long Beach, California and attended the Otis College of Art and Design in Los Angeles, California.

=== Career ===
He spent the first eighteen years of his career as an illustrator and graphic designer. He also taught at his alma mater, the Otis Parsons Art Institute, as well as at the Academy of Art in San Francisco, California.

Since the 1990s, he has painted his work in a studio in Pasadena, California, first in Old Town, then at the Castle Green, and finally in West Pasadena near the Arroyo. Now, he resides in San Clemente, CA, with his family, enjoying the sea breeze and sunny weather.

His early influences include the photographer Louise Dahl-Wolfe, American advertisements from the 1950s, Fred Astaire and Alfred Hitchcock, as well as the writings of John Cheever, F. Scott Fitzgerald and Raymond Carver. He also credits David Alfaro Siqueiros, Bartolomé Esteban Murillo, and José Clemente Orozco, as well as Edward Hopper. Like Hopper and Grant Wood, he paints "narrative realism," set in California. His work "captures a Southern California where Walt Disney and Raymond Chandler collide." His paintings are influenced by Depression-era American artists like Edward Hopper and Grant Wood, as well as Mexican modernists like his great-uncle Roberto Montenegro. He is best known for his oil paintings, but has also had exhibitions of watercolor paintings and mosaic murals. The New Yorker has used his imagery nine times for their covers. In 2013, he did paintings for the American Contemporary Ballet. Additionally, his paintings were featured in the 2003 Nancy Meyers film, Something's Gotta Give. In 2005, he published a two-volume art book set called Rhyme and Reason, Prose and Cons. As of 2023, Nelson has begun to draw more inspiration from his Mexican heritage and favorite Mexican painters, and is exploring new themes that center around his family's history and culture.

His work has been exhibited domestically, at the Pasadena Museum of California Art, the Peter Mendenhall Gallery in Los Angeles, the Reynolds Gallery at Westmont College in Montecito, California, the Cumberland Gallery in Nashville, Tennessee as well as the Eleanor Ettinger Gallery in New York City. More recently, Nelson had a 2024 exhibition in San Clemente's Casa Romantica.

It has also been exhibited internationally, at the Plus One Gallery in London, England, at Galerie Nikolaus Ruzicska in Salzburg, Austria, and Galerie Michael Haas in Berlin, Germany. Famous collectors include Steve Martin, Diane Keaton, Dean Koontz, and Kevin Costner.

=== Special projects ===
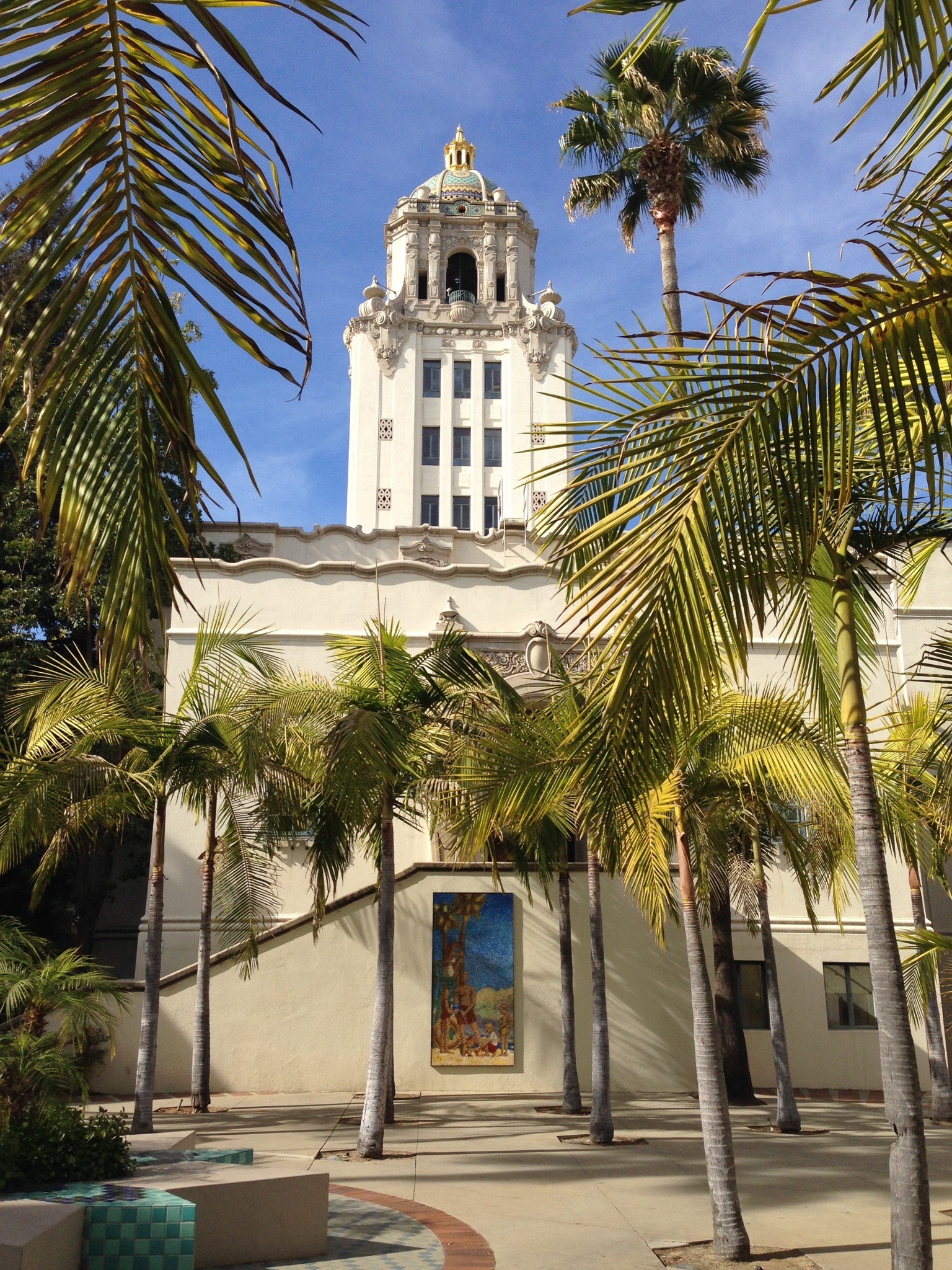
Kenton Nelson's mosaic mural, "Brody Beach" on display in 2014 for the Arts of Palm Centennial Celebration in Beverly Hills

He has also painted a wall in Pasadena, crediting his great-uncle as an influence to become a muralist himself. One of them, at the former Rite Spot Cafe on the corners of Colorado Boulevard and Fair Oaks Avenue, was inspired by Atlas Shrugged by Ayn Rand and the Works Progress Administration. Moreover, as part of the Beverly Hills Centennial Arts of Palm Installation, he installed a temporary glass mosaic on a wall of the Palm Court of the Beverly Hills Civic Center between Crescent Drive and Rexford Drive in Beverly Hills, California.

=== Personal life ===
After leaving Pasadena in 2021, Nelson now resides in San Clemente, California.

=== Books ===
- Picturing a Perfect World: Paintings by R. Kenton Nelson. Published 1998.
- Rhyme and Reason, Prose and Cons, Paintings by R. Kenton Nelson. Published 2005 by Pasadena Museum of California Art, Reynolds Gallery at Westmont College, and Morton Court Publishing. ISBN 0-9669905-0-1
- Kenton Nelson, Present Tense. Published 2008 by Peter Mendenhall Gallery and Galerie Nikolaus Ruzicska. ISBN 978-0-9669905-2-2
- Californian Idealism: Paintings by Kenton Nelson. Published 2015 by Bakersfield Museum of Art and Morton Court Publishing. ISBN 978-0-9669905-1-5
- Water: Californian Idealism by Kenton Nelson. Published 2019 by Prospect Park Books. ISBN 978-1-945551-58-1
- Kenton Nelson: Thirty Swimming Pools. Published 2021 by Peter Mendenhall Gallery. ISBN 978-0-9818749-8-2

== Bibliography ==
- R. Kenton Nelson. Rhyme and Reason. 2005.
