= Brad Howe =

American sculptor from California (born 1959)

- Born: 1959 (age 66–67); Riverside, California
- Occupation: Sculptor

Brad Howe (born 1959) is an American sculptor from California. His work has been exhibited domestically and internationally.

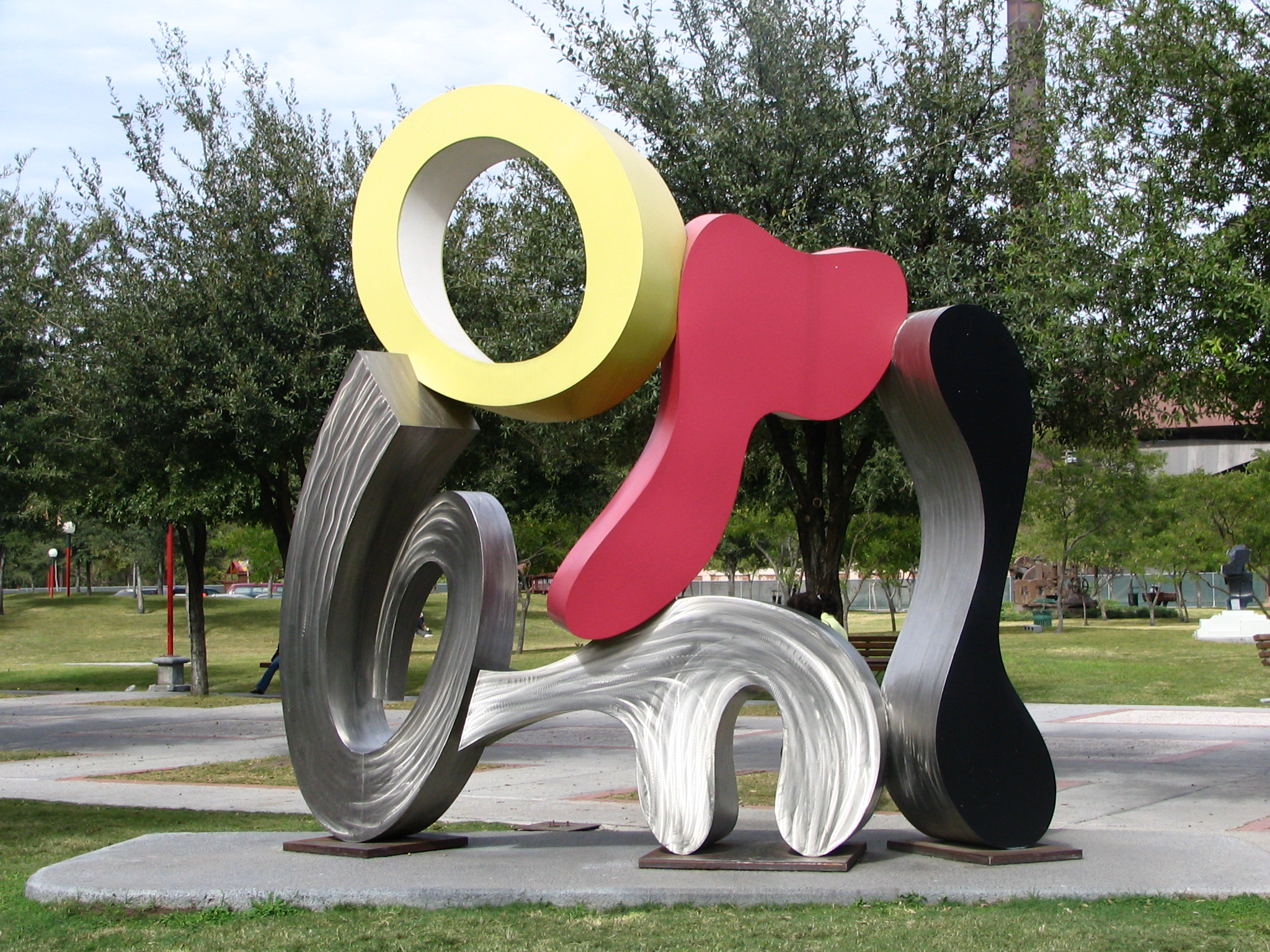
"Atlas Melody" in Fundidora Park in Monterrey, Mexico.

== Early life ==
Brad Howe was born in 1959 in Riverside, California. As a student of International Relations at Stanford University, Howe attended the University of São Paulo to specialize in Literature and Economic History with the intention of pursuing a career in diplomacy, but it was there that, after falling in with a group of architecture students, he discovered his passion for art and design.

== Career ==
He started his career as a sculptor in Brazil, first using pieces of scrap metal and wire to assemble kinetic mobiles, following what he had seen in a book of work by Alexander Calder.

After successfully selling his first sculptures to an architect in Rio de Janeiro and receiving subsequent commissions, he committed to a career as an artist.

Since then, Howe has exhibited in over eighteen countries worldwide. His work can be found in numerous private collections, and he has completed dozens of large-scale, public projects, including commissions by the City of Beverly Hills, the Massachusetts Institute of Technology (MIT) in Boston, Temple University in Philadelphia, and UCLA.

Working primarily with stainless steel, aluminum, bronze, and polyurethane, Howe continues to produce work in a number of formats, from the kinetic sculptures for which he first became known to painting-like wall works, monumental bronzes, and experimental maquettes. Howe describes his work as "mirrors with triggers" — forms that reflect the viewer's perspective and reward careful observation with suggestive possibilities that fire off imagination.

== Personal life ==
He resides in Los Angeles, California.

== Bibliography ==
- Brad Howe. Brad Howe: A Survey of Sculpture. Galerie Uli Lang, 2008. 48 pages.
