= William J. Gage =

American architect

- Born: March 8, 1891; New York City
- Died: September 28, 1965 (aged 74); Los Angeles County, California
- Occupation: Architect

William J. Gage (March 8, 1891 – September 28, 1965) was an American architect. He designed many buildings in Los Angeles County, California, including Beverly Hills and Bel Air.

== Biography ==
William John Gage was born in New York City. Gage had been trained at the University of Illinois Urbana-Champaign. His career began in architectural firms in Chicago, Illinois. With architect Harry G. Koerner (c. 1881 - 1935), Gage designed private residences and government buildings in Beverly Hills. In the mid-1920s, they designed a seven-bedroom house in the Renaissance Revival style. In 1931, they designed the Beverly Hills City Hall in the Spanish Colonial Revival style, and the two men attended its dedication in April 1932.

Gage designed the Scout House for the Beverly Hills chapter of the Boy Scouts of America in 1934. He designed a Neocolonial house in Beverly Hills in 1938; it belonged to actress Donna Reed. He also designed the Shepherd Residence in the Neoclassical and Regency styles in Bel Air in 1938.

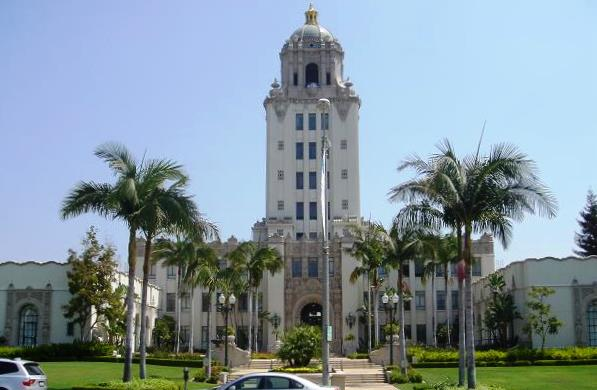
The Beverly Hills City Hall, designed by Gage and Koerner.
