= Beverly Hills Public Library =

Public library located in Los Angeles

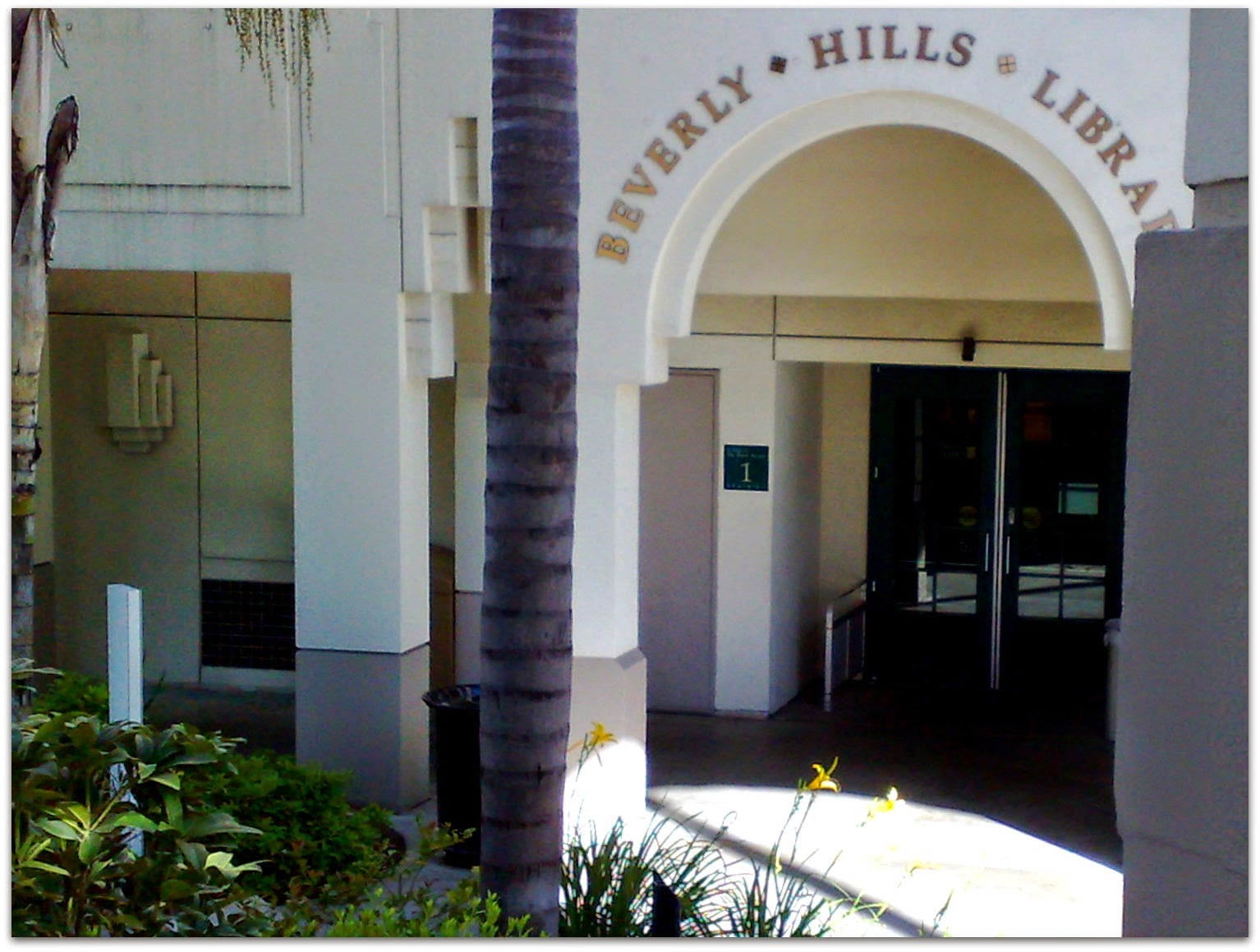
- The library is located next to the Beverly Hills Police Department headquarters, near Beverly Hills City Hall.

- Location within Western Los Angeles

General information
- Type: Library
- Location: Beverly Hills, California, 444 N. Rexford Drive, Beverly Hills, California, 90310
- Coordinates: 34°4′23″N 118°23′58″W

The Beverly Hills Public Library (abbreviated BHPL) is a public library in Beverly Hills, California. The library is located next door to the BHPD headquarters, opposite the Beverly Hills Fire Department, and near the Beverly Hills City Hall.

== History ==
On December 23, 1929, the Beverly Hills City Council passed an ordinance creating a Municipal Public Library. The city rented a small space in the E. J. Krause Building, located at 401 North Canon Drive. A three-member Library Board supervised the library with appropriations from the general fund. By 1930, Beverly Hills' population had reached 17,428. With a collection of 10,288 volumes, 5,152 registered borrowers, and an annual circulation of 100,797, the library outgrew its limited shelving space and needed to move. In 1932, the library was relocated to the North Wing in the new City Hall.

In the early 1940s, the number of borrowers once again increased and the collection quadrupled to 43,036. There was an annual circulation of 202,930. This resulted in the expansion of the library to two floors in the city hall. Another change occurred in 1945 when the City Council voted to eliminate the Library Board. This decision enabled the library to fall under the auspices of the Mayor and the City Council.

The Friends of the Beverly Hills Public Library, founded in 1959, raised funds to enhance the library's services. In 1962, a bond issue for a new building failed by 464 votes. A second bond issue to fund the construction of the library, however, passed in 1963. The library opened in August 1965. The facade of the library served as Mike Brady's office on the television show The Brady Bunch.

The library underwent extensive renovation in 1990 under Charles Moore's Renovation Group design. The plan included a new building for the library, which opened September 11, 1990. In January 2013, the children's section was reopened after a facelift. (Previously, it was temporarily housed on the second floor.) Currently, the library is open to all members of the public and any resident of Ventura, Orange, or Los Angeles Counties may become a member. The library also offers free computer cards to anyone with a valid photo ID.
