= Malcolm T. Liepke =

American artist

- Born: October 31, 1953 (age 72); Minneapolis, USA
- Education: Art Center College of Design (Los Angeles)

Malcolm T. Liepke (Minneapolis, Minnesota, 1953) is a contemporary American painter.

He studied at the Art Center College of Design in Los Angeles, California, but left school to move to New York, where he worked as an illustrator for publications such as Time, Newsweek, Forbes and Fortune.

His artworks are now in the collection of the Smithsonian Institution and the Brooklyn Museum.
