= History of the Caltech house system =

The history of the house system at the California Institute of Technology encompasses both the history of the physical houses and of the student self-governance and culture associated with them. The Caltech house system currently encompasses eight houses: the South Houses constructed in 1931 hosts four houses, the North Houses constructed in 1960 hosts three, and Avery House constructed in 1996.

== Background ==
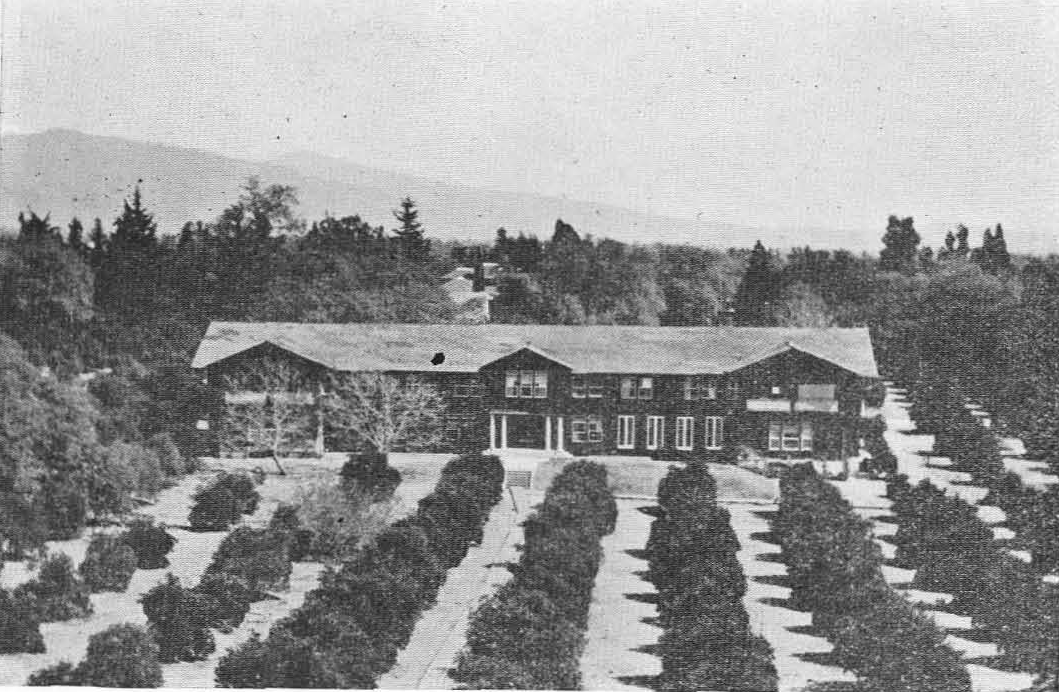
The Old Dormitory in 1921

Throop Polytechnic Institute was founded in 1891, and adopted the name California Institute of Technology in 1920. Even before the establishment of the house system, many elements of student self-governance were in place. The honor code was established in 1910, and in 1913 the Board of Control was established, a student body that had jurisdiction over violations of the honor code.

Prior to the construction of the South Houses, there was a single on-campus dormitory housing 60 students. This building was designed by Myron Hunt and Elmer Grey for Throop Polytechnic Institute, and had been constructed in 1910 elsewhere in Pasadena. In 1915 it was cut into seven sections and moved to the current campus. In 1924, a small building called the Dugout, designed by Henry Greene, was constructed near the original dormitory as a lounge for off-campus students.

There were also five off-campus fraternities that together held 118 students, with about 350 students living in their own housing. The fraternities were Kappa Gamma, also known as Gnome (established in 1897); Sigma Alpha Pi (1914); Pi Alpha Tau (1921); Phi Alpha Ro, also known as Pharos (1921); and Gamma Sigma (1925).

== Construction of the South Houses ==
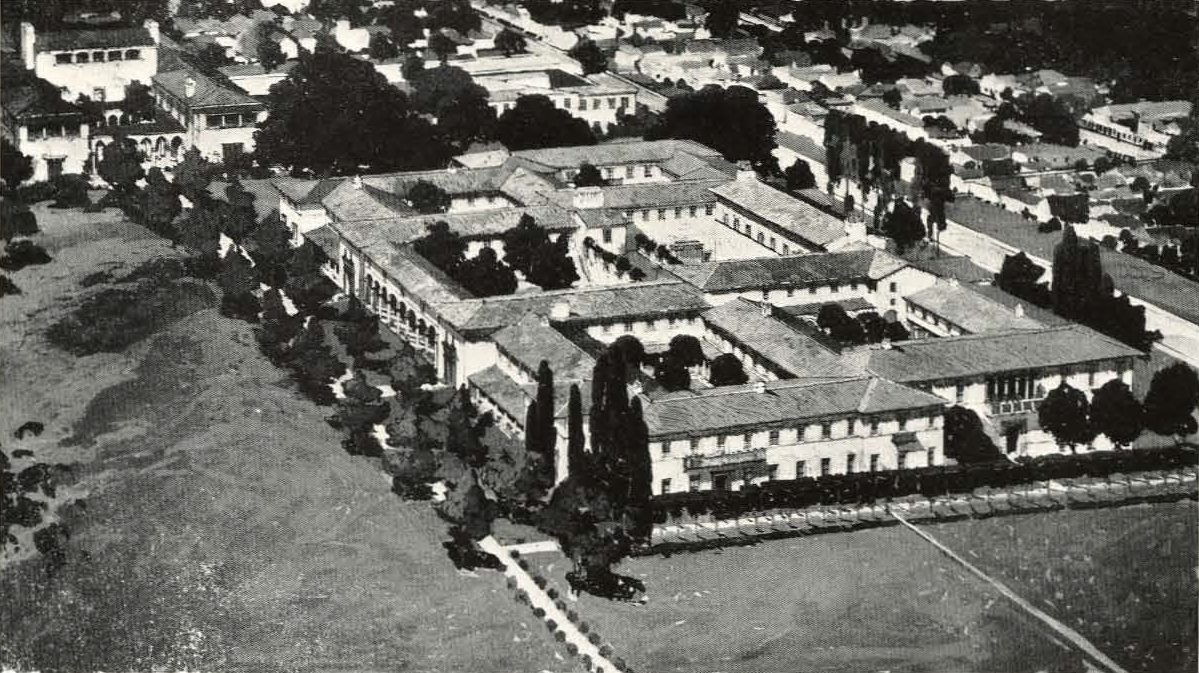
The South Houses in 1931

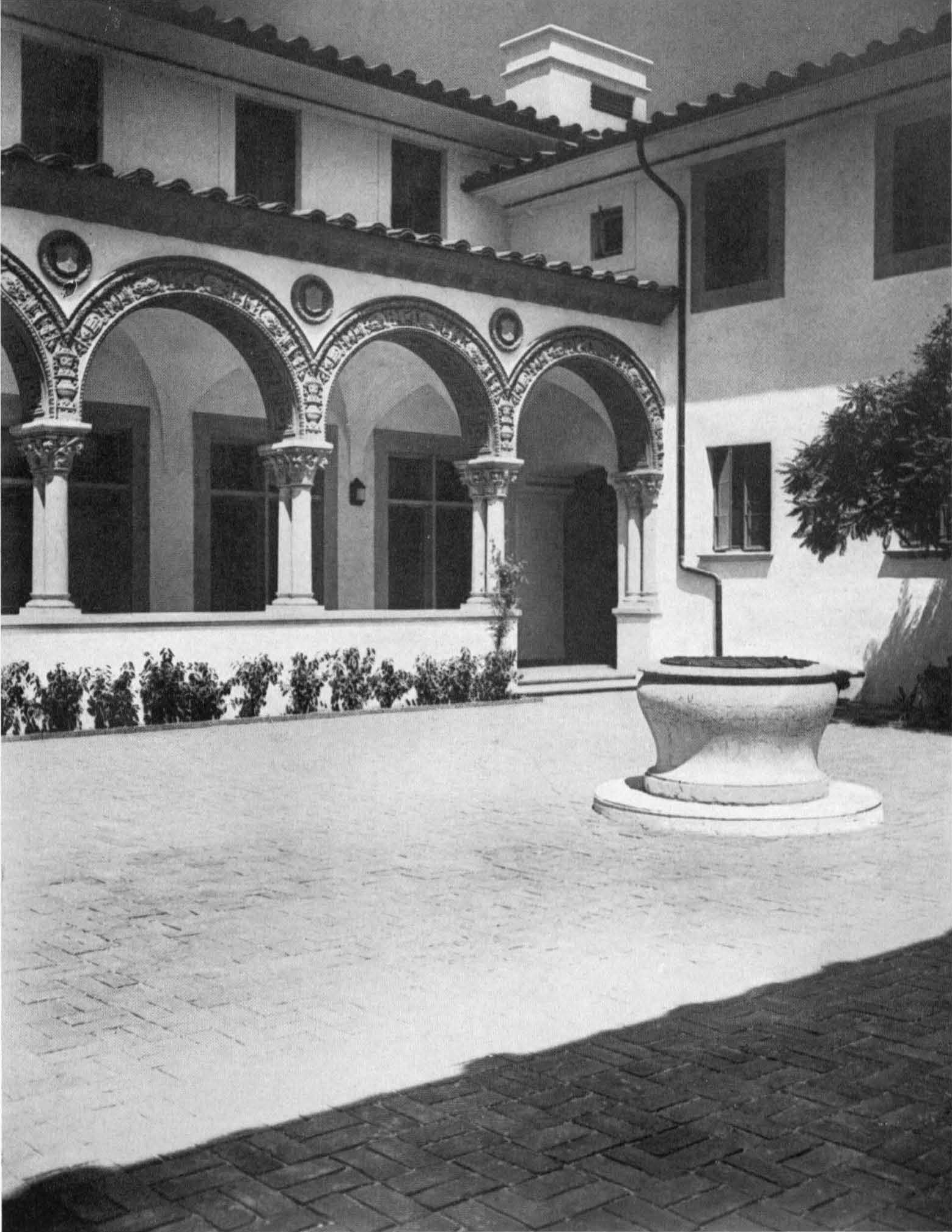
Ricketts House courtyard in 1933

The complex containing the first four houses, now known as the South Houses, were constructed in 1931 to enable the goal of housing as many students as possible on campus. A committee of nine students was appointed to tour the United States, Canada, and Europe to report on student housing and recommend an organization for Caltech's house system. The students recommended a series of residence halls with no more than 75 students each, divided by separate entries into subgroups of 25 rooms to encourage a close-knit setting, and each having a small dining room with a common kitchen. The design of the housing system of this type was similar to contemporary efforts at Harvard, at Yale, and at Princeton, with the goal of being a deliberate framework for organizing student life into small communities outside the classroom, rather than being simple dormitories.

The houses were designed by architect Gordon Kaufmann based on earlier plans by Bertram Goodhue. They are designed in a Mediterranean style, with low horizontal buildings centered around six courtyards. The decorative details of the courtyards give each a distinctive identity. Multiple locations in the houses feature decorative capitals depicting scientists, musicians, and sportsmen, which were cast from structural concrete by Caltech alumnus John H. Hood. These "whimsical depictions of the academic scholar at study, rest, and play" are an example of the emphasis on architecture's role in shaping the residential community.

Three of the four houses were named after their donors: Louis D. Ricketts, Robert Roe Blacker, and Joseph B. Dabney. The fourth was funded by several smaller donors and named for Arthur H. Fleming, longtime President of the Caltech Board of Trustees. The existing fraternities were disbanded, with each moving into one of the four houses: Gnomes occupied Ricketts House, Pharos occupied Blacker House, Gamma Sigma occupied Dabney House, and both Pi Alpha Tau and Sigma Alpha Pi occupied Fleming House. The Dugout was organized into the Throop Club which effectively acted as a fifth house, even though it did not participate in Rotation.

The process of Rotation was established in 1933 to match incoming freshmen into the houses. Initially freshmen lived in each house for a short time, but in the 1950s this was changed to students rotating meals in each of the houses. The first written Rotation rules were made in 1951, after a scandal in which Dabney House offered freshmen blind dates and cars full of gas for them, and announced its social schedule during Rotation.

The student government, the Associated Students of the California Institute of Technology (ASCIT), has existed since at least 1913; it became an incorporated entity in 1935 after a lawsuit over a publishing contract for the yearbook. In 1940, the first Master of Student Houses was appointed. The first annual Interhouse party was held in 1934, and would be held until being banned after 1989, while Ricketts House's Apache Dance was first held in 1947.

== Construction of the North Houses ==
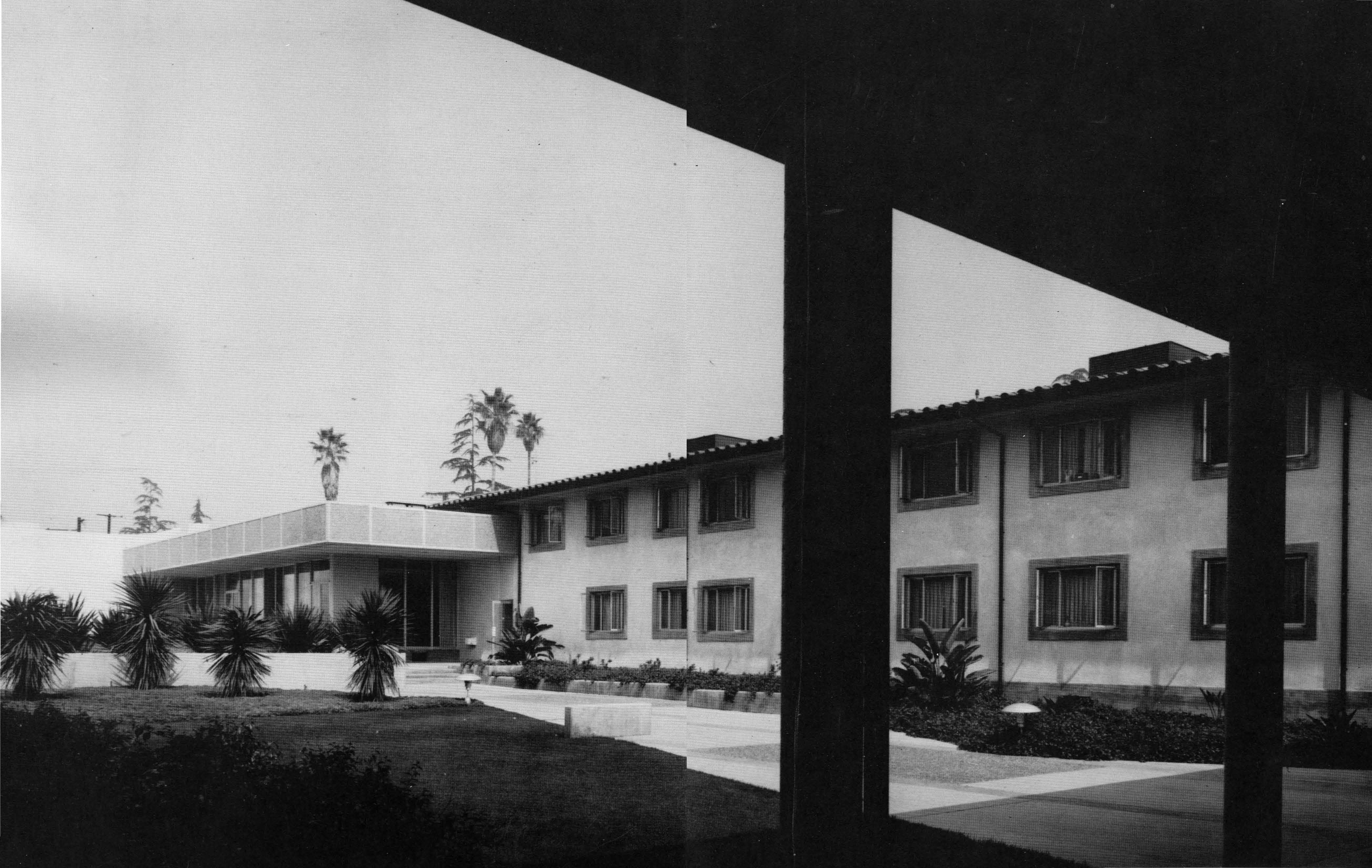
The North Houses in 1962

The North Houses, hosting three new houses, were constructed in 1960 just to the north of the original houses. The North Houses were designed by Smith, Powell, and Morgridge in a modern style, although the red tile roofs were intended to echo the adjacent South Houses. The three houses were named after James R. Page; Ralph B. Lloyd and Lulu Hull Lloyd; and Albert B. Ruddock.

Although most of the initial residents of the North Houses were continuing students who had previously lived off-campus, a significant number moved from the South Houses into the North, with many Ricketts members moving into Page House, and many Dabney members moving into Ruddock House. This movement caused the cultures of Ricketts and Dabney to change significantly, while those of Blacker and Fleming remained stable. The opening of the new houses caused discussion about the future of Rotation, which was not held for three years, but was reinstated in 1963.

The Old Dormitory and Dugout were demolished and the Winnett Student Center was constructed in their place in 1962. The fireplace in the Dugout, which contained bricks engraved with the names of the original donors, was saved and integrated into Winnett, and later its replacement, the Hameetman Center.

Although the Interhouse Committee had existed since the construction of the South Houses, a formal written "definition" was only adopted in 1966, with the Interhouse Committee becoming more prominent in student governance. Caltech began admitting woman undergraduates in 1970. The first woman ASCIT president was elected in 1974, and the first house president in 1975. At the 1986 Interhouse party there was a stabbing; the party was suspended after 1989. The first Director of Residence Life was appointed in 1990.

In 1999, the Conduct Review Committee was established to take over non-academic student conduct investigations from the Board of Control. The Conduct Review Committee was a committee of the administration rather than the student government, although it still had student members, and was seen as an adaptation of the honor system to increasing administrative regulation.

== Construction of Avery House ==
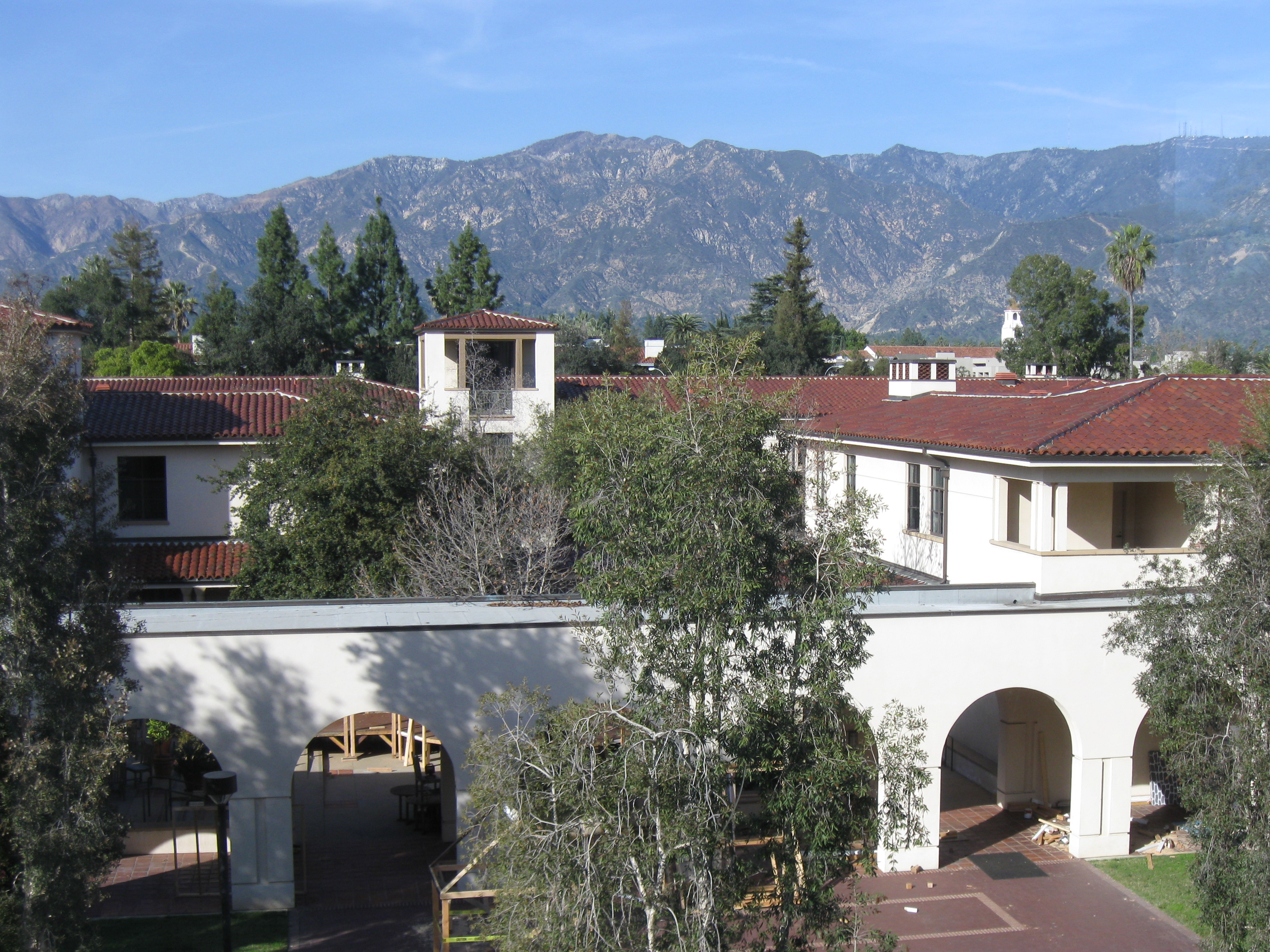
Avery House in 2010

Avery House was constructed in 1996 in the northeast corner of the campus, not adjacent to the older seven houses. It was named for donor R. Stanton Avery and designed by Moore Ruble Yudell Architects. It was intended to encourage greater interaction between undergraduate and graduate students and faculty, and foster an entrepreneurial spirit. The design took inspiration from the South Houses, with stucco walls, red tile roofs, columns, and arcades, and with two courtyards bearing multiple entries into groups of rooms.

Avery initially did not participate in Rotation and was not seen as part of the house system, rather having a reputation as "a place for outcasts", largely isolated from and an alternative to the social and physical conditions of the older seven houses. Avery's student government, the Avery Council, strongly pushed for Avery to house freshmen, and in 2004 the Faculty Housing Board voted to approve Avery House's inclusion in Rotation. This decision was controversial and was strongly protested by the greater undergraduate student body. Avery House first participated in Rotation in 2005.

== Subsequent events ==
In 2000 the Task Force on Undergraduate Resident Life Initiatives (TURLI) issued a report that led to discussion but no immediate major changes to the houses. Among the report's recommendations were to renovate and restore the South Houses, and to demolish and replace the North Houses due to their poor condition and lack of architectural appeal; other recommendations included considering reforms or alternatives to Rotation and house traditions, increasing interactions between individual houses, expanding the faculty-in-residence program from Avery into all the houses, and increasing the diversity of room types within the houses including the introduction of suites.

The South Houses were renovated and restored during 2005–2006 to repair deterioration in roofing and decorative elements, as well as modernize the building infrastructure and the interior design. The renovations won a Pasadena Historic Preservation Award in 2007. During the renovations, students lived in temporary modular housing, which was disliked by many students. Although students continued to express a desire to demolish and replace the North Houses, the Great Recession made this infeasible during the years directly after the South Houses reopened.

In 2018, the new Bechtel Residence opened. It was named for Stephen D. Bechtel Jr. Bechtel had 212 beds arranged mainly into suites, and realized a goal of having the capacity to house all students on campus. It was designed by ZGF Architects.

In 2021, Caltech decided to rename Ruddock House due to Albert B. Ruddock's advocacy of eugenics. The House was renamed for Grant D. Venerable, the first Black student to graduate from Caltech.
