= House system at the California Institute of Technology =

Caltech student residence system

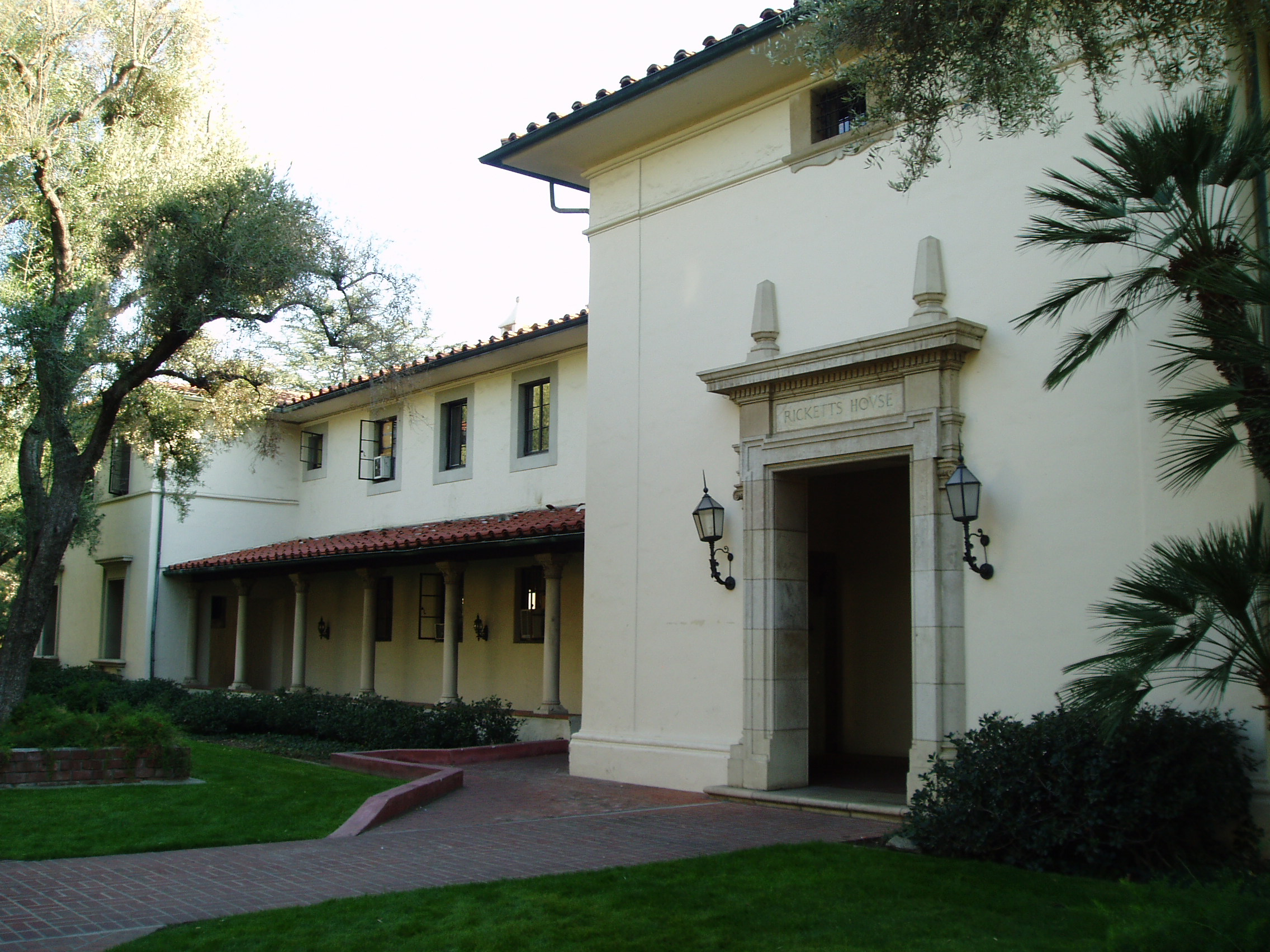
The exterior of Ricketts House, typical of the architecture of the 1931 Spanish-style south houses as seen in 2004

The house system is the basis of undergraduate student residence at the California Institute of Technology (Caltech). Caltech's unique house system is modeled after the residential college system of Oxford and Cambridge in England, although the houses are more similar in size and character to the Yale University residential colleges and Harvard University house system. Like a residential college, a house embodies two closely connected concepts: it serves as both a physical building where a majority of its members reside and as the center of social activity for its members. Houses also serve as part of the student government system, each house having rules for its own self-government and also serving as constituencies for committees of the campus-wide student governments, the Associated Students of the California Institute of Technology, incorporated (ASCIT) and the Interhouse Committee (IHC).

The houses resemble fraternities at other American universities in the shared loyalties they engender. Unlike in fraternities, however, potentially dangerous "rushing" or "pledging" is replaced with two weeks of "Rotation" at the beginning of a student's freshman year, and students generally remain affiliated with one house for the duration of their undergraduate studies.

Freshmen have historically gone through a process known as Rotation for a week before term through the first week of classes, leading to their eventual house assignment by way of a matching process. This process has rules associated with it to try to give freshmen a chance to choose among the houses in an unbiased way.

== History ==
Caltech established the house system in 1931, disbanding the existing fraternities and recasting them as Blacker House, Dabney House, Fleming House and Ricketts House, located in the complex known as the student houses, then old houses, and later south houses. The fraternities were as follows:

- Blacker: Phi Alpha Rho, also known as Pharo
- Dabney: Gamma Sigma
- Fleming: Sigma Alpha Pi and Pi Alpha Tau
- Ricketts: Kappa Gamma, also known as Gnome

Expanding student population was accommodated in 1960 with the new houses, or north houses: Lloyd House, Page House, and Ruddock House (later renamed to Venerable House).

A new state-of-the-art residential facility named Avery House, was opened in 1996, touted as a facility that allowed undergraduate students, graduate students and faculty to not only mingle, but live together. As a result, Avery was not initially considered part of the house system, and freshmen were not allowed to live there. In the 2003–2004 school year, the Avery Council (the student government of Avery House) campaigned for Avery to participate in Rotation and take freshmen. This change was opposed by the Caltech undergraduate student body by a five-to-one margin, but the Faculty Board voted overwhelmingly to approve the change. Beginning in the 2005–2006 school year, freshmen began to rotate into Avery, changing its status to a fully represented house.

Also in 2005, work began on a major renovation project for the aging south houses, whose residents were relocated to a temporary modular housing complex. The renovations were completed at the beginning of the 2007 calendar year. Students moved back into the south houses on 15 December 2006, though construction continued through the beginning of 2007.

Like most of the older buildings on campus, Avery House and the south houses are in California Mission style, and resemble cloistered monasteries with enclosed courtyards; the north houses are of Modern design.

== House memberships ==
There are two ways to gain membership in a house: rotate in at the beginning of one's freshman year and become a full member, or become a social or full member afterwards. Procedures for admitting new members vary depending upon house bylaws and type of membership.

=== Rotation ===
Rotation is the process by which incoming freshmen choose (and are chosen by) the house they will be affiliated with. In Caltech parlance, freshmen are called "frosh" and are referred to as "prefrosh" until the revelation of their house affiliation at the end of rotation. Upon first arriving at Caltech, the incoming freshmen are given a random room assignment in a random house that is different from their Prefrosh Weekend assignment, and then spend a week eating mainly dinner and dessert in all of the houses, getting an opportunity to meet people in all of the houses.

These meals and meetings are an opportunity both for the prefrosh to get to know the feel of the different houses and for the upperclassmen to meet and form opinions on the prefrosh so both can see where they might belong. Many houses also show house-made videos to the prefrosh, which yield the prefrosh additional information about the various personalities of the houses. At the end of this week, the frosh rate each of the eight houses in order of preference. Based on this, and the opinions of the houses' existing members, the prefrosh are placed into a house which will be their home physically and socially for the next few years. The Interhouse Committee attempts to ensure a certain level of secrecy regarding the exact process, so that the confidentiality of both the freshmen and those involved with their final housing assignments is maintained. Also, the selection process is constrained: there are only a limited number of openings in each house, and it is impossible to simultaneously meet the preferences of all of the freshmen and houses.

Despite the constraints, this two-way selection process of joining a house, and social interaction after joining, gives each house a distinctive personality that is stable over decades.

=== Later membership ===
There is a second way to obtain membership in a house: to apply at some point after rotation. The process varies from house to house, but in general one makes an announcement at dinner to the effect of "I would like to be a member of ___ House," (Note: "Booty House" is commonly used to refer to any unspecified house, and appears as the house named in examples of Rotation rules violations.) and the House conducts a vote (the nature of the vote, again, varying). All houses except Ricketts have two tiers of memberships: full members and social members.

Anyone who rotates into a house is automatically a full member; individuals who would like to become members afterward can choose between full and social membership. The relative difficulties in attaining full and social memberships differ from house to house, as do the relative privileges that each membership type affords. The only universal truths are that full membership is harder to attain than social and that full members may live in house-associated property while social members may not. Generally speaking, social members are able to attend all house social events (ski trips, hikes, etc.).

== List of the houses ==
House	Members	Color (#hex)	Voting system	Slogan	Motto(s)	Website
South houses
Blacker House	Moles	Black	Ranked pairs	γδβγ (God Damn Blacker Gang)	Sed nvlla nisi ardva virtvs "Nothing is worthwhile unless it is difficult"	http://blacker.caltech.edu/
Dabney House	Darbs	Green	Ranked pairs	DEI (Dabney Eats It)	Fidelis et gratus "Faithfulness and thankfulness"	https://dabney.caltech.edu/
Fleming House	Flems	Red	Two-round system; the two-winner Board of Control representative election is decided by running two successive single-winner two-round elections	Go Big Red or FEIF (Fleming Eats It Faster) [now somewhat infrequent]	Let the deed shaw	https://fleming.sites.caltech.edu/
Ricketts House	Skurves / Scurves	Maroon	Ranked pairs	FGD	Prend moi tel que je suis "Take me as I am"	http://ricketts.caltech.edu/
North houses
Lloyd House	Lloydies	Gold	Instant runoff voting (single-winner elections) and single transferable vote (multi-winner elections)	Lloyd sucks!	I live and die for those I love	http://lloyd.caltech.edu/
Page House	Pageboy (gender neutral)	Blue	Hybrid of two-round system and exhaustive ballot in which all but the top two candidates are eliminated after the first found of voting unless the third place candidate receives at least 80% as many votes as the second place candidate	Thank You For Not Sucking!	Spe labor levis, (Et spe vinum gravis) "May the work be light (and the drinks be heavy)"	http://www.its.caltech.edu/~jrpage/
Venerable House	Vens	Navy blue	Ranked pairs, except for Board of Control representatives elected by two-winner instant runoff	The People (QED)	Aut viam inveniam aut faciam "Either I will find a way, or I will make a way"	http://venerable.caltech.edu/
Other
Avery House	Averites	Purple	Instant runoff (single-winner elections) and single transferable vote (multi-winner elections)	A very fine house	Creativity, integrity, tenacity	http://avery.caltech.edu/

== South houses ==
The south house complex opened in 1931. The South houses sometimes style themselves as "hovses," in the Latin tradition of using the letters "v" and "u" interchangeably, as the names on the buildings are written using the letter "v".

=== Blacker House ===
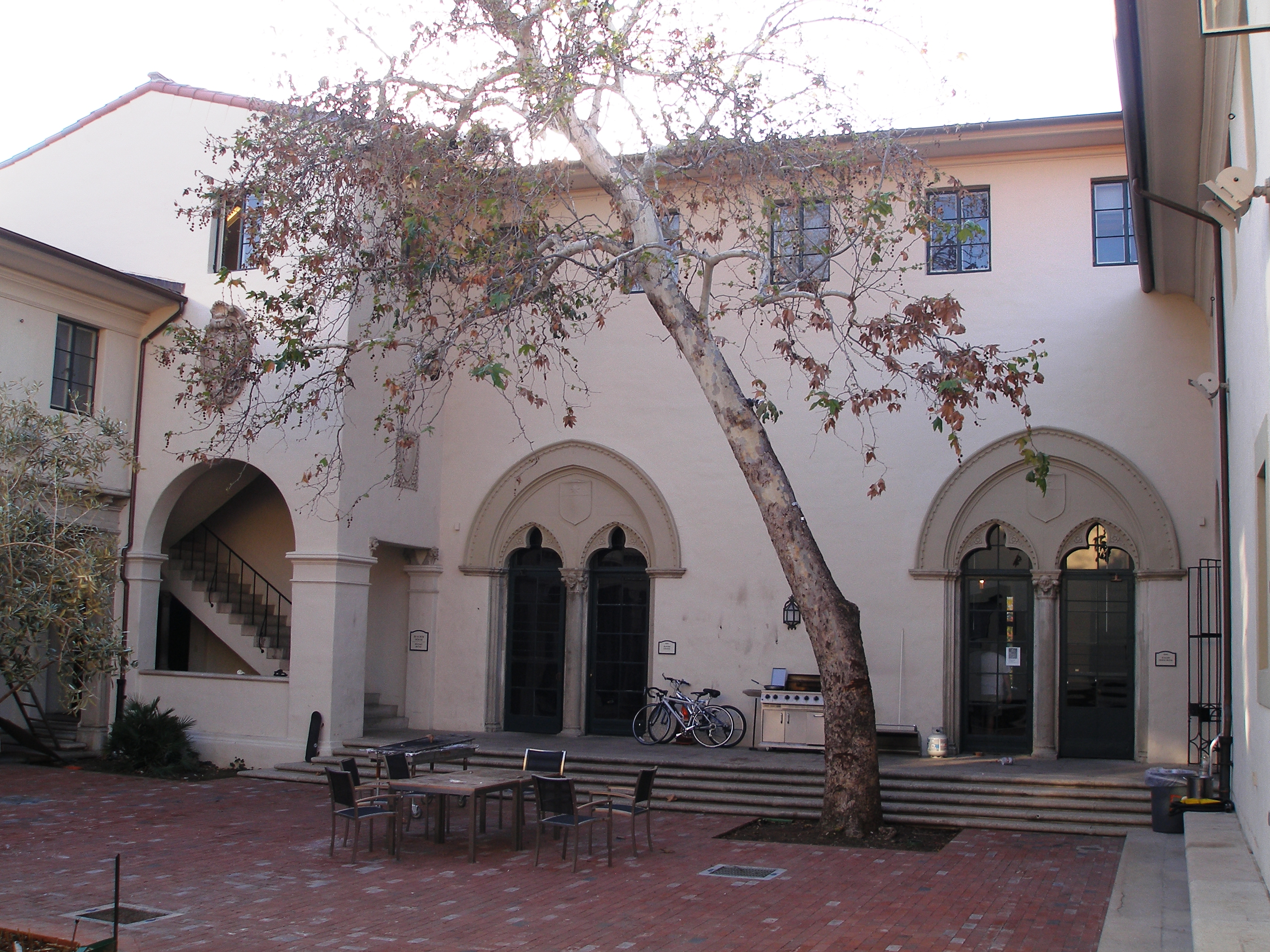
Blacker courtyard in 2008

Blacker House was built with the help of funds donated by Robert Roe Blacker, a trustee of Caltech. Members of Blacker House are referred to as Moles.

One of the traditions of Blacker House is the hellride. In a defiant response to the prohibition against playing Ride of the Valkyries, the freshmen living in a part of the house named Hell (so called for its unbearable heat in the summer and cramped quarters) would announce a hellride. They then barricade the hallway and play the "Ride" at high volume, daring the upperclassmen to break in and drag everyone to be drenched in the showers.

Blacker House features halls painted as Heaven and Hell, as well as a small lounge and kitchenette in between them known as Purgatory. Blacker's courtyard formerly featured a habitable treehouse and a giant tire swing, but the tree that bore them was cut down during renovations of the house in the 2005–2006 academic year. Attached to another tree was another wooden swing, but that was cut down in 2019. In another side of the courtyard is a couch swing.

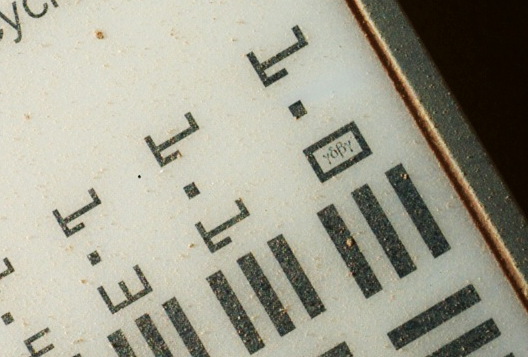
The Blacker House slogan γδβγ mysteriously appears on a camera calibration target on NASA's Curiosity rover. If anyone at the Caltech Jet Propulsion Laboratory knows how it got there, they aren't telling

The letters of Blacker House are γδβγ (Greek letters for gdbg, or God damn Blacker gang). The story is that in 1978 or 1979, it was popular for Blacker students to climb on top of elevators and ride them. One time, security went inside the elevator looking for the students, who were on top of the elevator. The security muttered, "God damn Blacker gang", and the phrase stuck. Blacker students began signing GDBG or γδβγ on all their pranks. Blacker has also been referred to as the house of fucking geniuses and the inscription HOFG can be found throughout the tunnels along with γδβγ. In the 1960s the house slogan was "Blacker House for gracious living" which became "the house of gracious living" by the 1990s.

Notable alumni include:

- William Shockley (1932) co-inventor of the transistor and Nobel laureate
- Walter Munk (1939) oceanographer who determined the reason for the moon's tidal locking with earth
- Carver Mead (1956) a key pioneer of modern microelectronics
- Kip Thorne (1962) Nobel Laureate and one of the world's leading experts on the astrophysical implications of Einstein's general theory of relativity, Richard P. Feynman Professor of Theoretical Physics, Emeritus at Caltech
- Michael Aschbacher (1966) an American mathematician best known for his work on finite groups
- Joseph Rhodes Jr. (1969, History) Pennsylvanian politician and activist
- Joseph Polchinski (1975) known for D-branes in string theory
- Zinovy Reichstein (1983, Mathematics) Mathematician, known for introducing the essential dimension
- Ian Agol (1992, Mathematics) Mathematician known for work in topology, professor at the University of California, Berkeley
- Doris Tsao (1997) MacArthur Fellow, Neuroscientist, Professor of Biology at Caltech
- Po-Shen Loh (2004, Mathematics) Professor of Mathematics at Carnegie Mellon University, coach of USA International Math Olympiad team
- SethBling (2009, Computer Science) video game YouTuber known for Minecraft redstone and speedrunning
- Marissa Weichman (2008, Chemistry) Assistant Professor of Chemistry at Princeton University

=== Dabney House ===
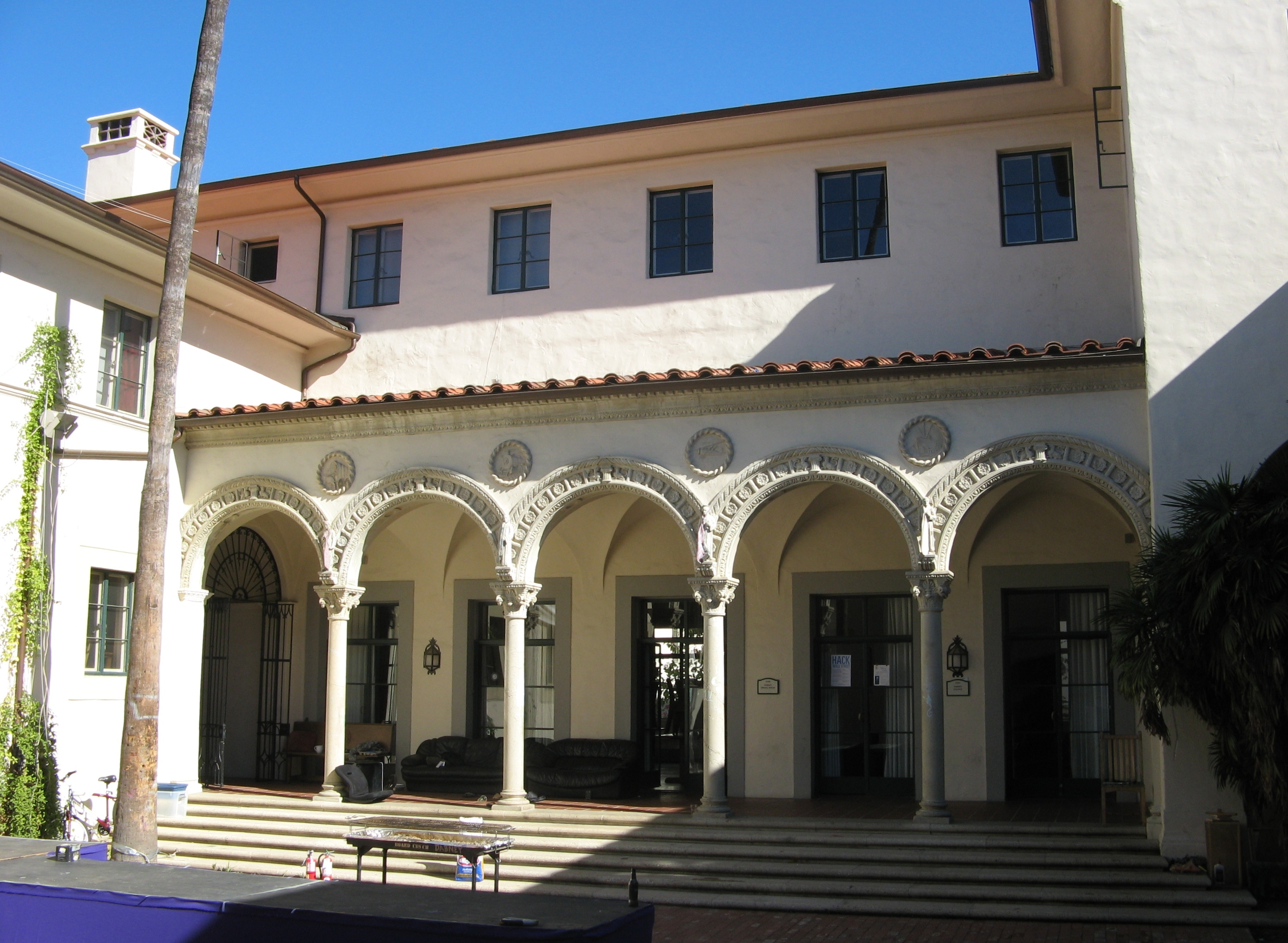
Dabney courtyard in 2008

Dabney House is the smallest of Caltech's houses. Members of Dabney House are referred to as Darbs, a combination of the name of the house with a 1920s slang term darb, meaning something or someone very handsome, valuable, attractive, or otherwise excellent. Joseph B. Dabney, owner of the Dabney Oil Syndicate, was a trustee of California Institute of Technology. Dabney Hall of the Humanities, a gift of Mr. and Mrs. Dabney, is one of the four corner buildings of Caltech's central courtyard. It was built in 1927. In 1928, the Dabneys gave $200,000 to build Dabney House, one of four new residence halls.

Dabney House, as part of the complex that makes up the four south houses, was constructed in 1930 and 1931. It was known as the house of gentlemen and the house of captains, but underwent a dramatic change in personality during the 1960s. In 1973, the house was disowned by the Dabney family when students from Dabney House protested then-President Nixon's role in the Watergate affair with a sign on the library bearing the phrase "Impeach Nixon."

The "minimalist coat-of-arms" of Dabney House, designed by old Darb Kaihsu Tai in the late 1990s, based on the Dabney family coat-of-arms.

Traditionally standing for "Dabney Eats It," referring to a particularly unpalatable plate of noodles in the 1950s, the trigraph DEI has come to be a badge of pride for Darbs. Besides naming the house's recreation room after it and spreading it all across campus, Dabney alumni have made DEI a hidden code in the outside world. The letters can be seen in movies (most notably Real Genius) and video games (including GTA: Vice City and several Intellivision games). There are even stories of the trigraph making its way into space on JPL probes including the Voyager space craft, and being written on the Moon by astronaut Darb Harrison Schmitt. In the late 1960s, during on-campus shooting of an episode of the TV series Mission: Impossible, students stenciled the letters "DEI" high on a wall in a tunnel scheduled to be filmed the next day. The marking was subsequently visible on national television behind Peter Lupus as he paused in one shot.

More recently, Dabney started the Student Coffee House, or "Chouse", and provided the majority of the staff for a couple years. Since then, Coffee House has become a part of Caltech's Dining Services and is now managed by CDS. Dabney hosts the annual Millikan Pumpkin Drop Experiment (a parody of the Millikan oil-drop experiment) where pumpkins frozen in liquid nitrogen are dropped from Millikan library. This tradition was featured on the TV show Numb3rs. Dabney also hosts Drop Day, a party held the Saturday after the second term drop day to celebrate the point of no return, and Dabney Metal Night, an opportunity for the amateur bands of Caltech to play for the crowd.

While the traditional motto of Dabney House (Fidelis et gratus "Faithfulness and thankfulness") still stands on the Dabney crest, Dabney House has instituted a new, changeable motto. In line with Caltech's tradition of wall murals and wall writings, any member may change the house motto by striking the previous motto on a designated motto wall and writing a new one.

==== Notable Darbs ====
- Harrison Schmitt (1957, Geology) – Geologist, Astronaut, Adjunct Professor of Engineering Physics at the University of Wisconsin-Madison, Politician
- John Clauser (1964, Physics) – Physicist, Nobel Laureate in Physics
- Barbara Turpin (1984, Engineering and Applied Science) - Chemist, Professor of Atmospheric Chemistry at the University of North Carolina at Chapel Hill
- Antonio Rangel (1993, Economics) – Bing Professor of Neuroscience, Behavioral Biology, and Economics at Caltech
- Brandi Cossairt (2006, Chemistry) – Lloyd E. and Florence M. West Endowed Professor of Chemistry at the University of Washington

=== Fleming House ===
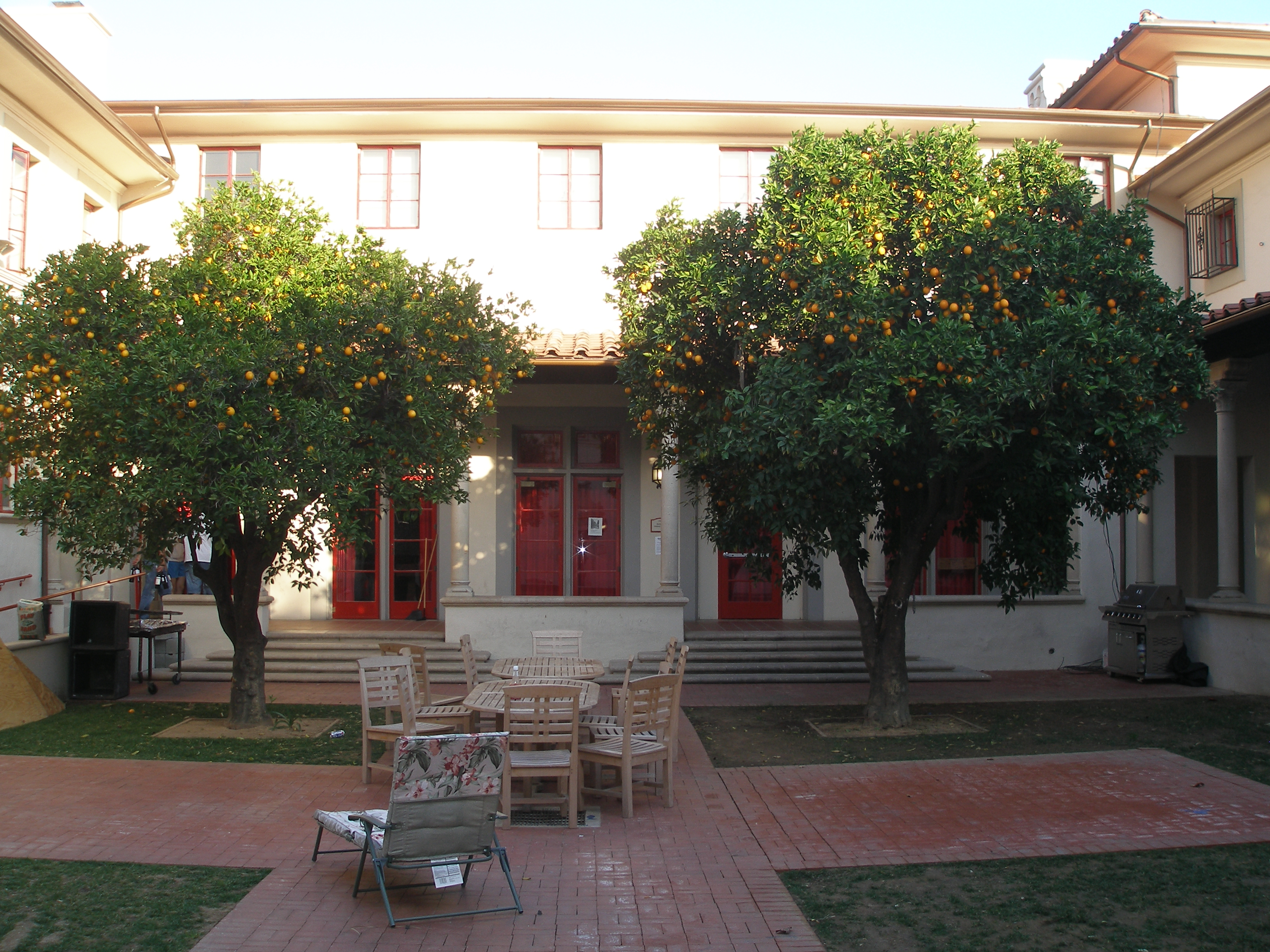
Fleming courtyard in 2008

Fleming House was built with funds donated by a number of people, and the name Fleming was chosen to honor Arthur H. Fleming, then the chairman of Caltech's Board of Trustees.

Members of Fleming House are called Flems. The house color is red. The motto, from the crest as commonly seen on house beer steins, is "Let the Deed Shaw." The house battle cry is "Go Big Red!" Another important maxim is "Flems stick together!", as well as the slogan "Where men are men, giants walk the earth, and the thundering herd is real" and "Page Sux". Historically, Fleming House did not offer social memberships (nominally citing all non-Fleming undergraduates as "social members"), but a recent decision by the house leadership changed this policy. Students may now apply for and obtain Fleming House social membership.

The physical layout of Fleming House includes rooms numbered 8.5 (formerly the RA apartment, now a triple),π, and "Alley 6.9". The Interhouse Trophy, awarded to the winner of the interhouse athletic competitions, has been awarded to Fleming for the past five years.

For the past few years, Fleming and Page House have pranked each other regularly and included each other in initiations.

==== Fleming cannon ====
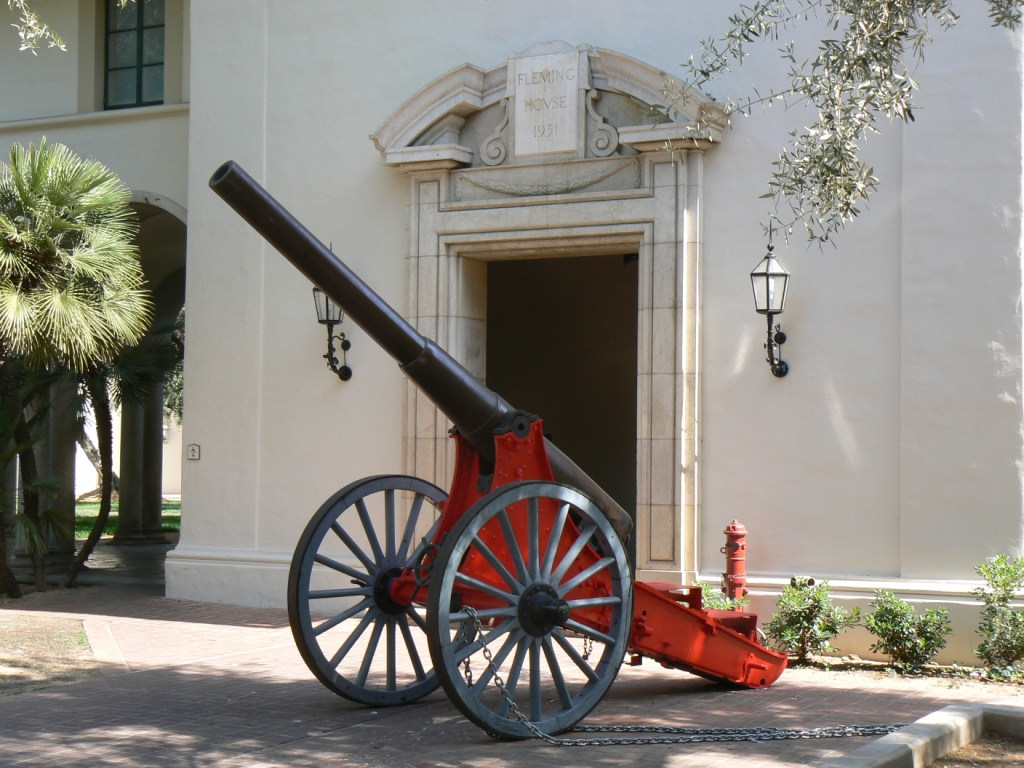
The Fleming cannon in June 2007

The Fleming cannon, a Caltech landmark, rests on its wheels on the Olive Walk in front of Fleming. As it makes a very loud noise when fired, it is only fired to mark important events, such as the end of Rotation, Ditch Day, the end of the term, and graduation. It was originally cast for use in the Franco-Prussian War but eventually found its way to the then-military themed Southwestern Academy in San Marino, California, where it remained on the front lawn between 1925 and 1972.

In 1972 Fleming class officers got permission from Southwestern Academy to take the cannon, but the underclassmen who mounted new wheels on it and dragged it to campus at night thought they were stealing it. It took months of paint stripping and other work to restore it to operational status. The Caltech administration ordered its return in 1975, but negotiations began for an official transfer of the cannon back to Caltech in 1980, and in 1981 it was returned on a permanent basis to the Caltech campus.

The cannon was stolen by Harvey Mudd students in 1986. At the demands of both college administrations, the cannon was returned to Fleming House approximately eight weeks after the prank.

It was rumored that Harvey Mudd would attempt to steal the cannon again in 2006 to celebrate the 20th anniversary of their original theft; however, the cannon disappeared on March 28, a day before the anniversary, only to show up at MIT just in time for Campus Preview Weekend, during which many rising freshmen visit MIT. A (seemingly fake) moving company by the name of Howe & Ser Moving Co. has taken credit. (The name is a double pun: When substituting "and" for the ampersand, it reads "how we answer", while substituting the Latin et for the ampersand gives "Howitzer".) Displayed prominently in front of MIT's Green Building, the Fleming cannon sported a giant, gold-plated MIT class ring around its barrel.

A day after the prank was disclosed, Fleming's members began planning a recovery operation on the night of April 7. They immediately sent twenty-three members to Boston to retrieve their cannon. The Flems were greeted at MIT by a group of students and police who watched as the cannon was loaded into a truck. Afterward, a friendly barbecue celebrated the event.

==== Notable Flems ====
- George O. Abell (1951, Astronomy) – Astronomer, Professor of Astronomy at the University of California, Los Angeles
- Ronald H. Willens (1953, Physics) – researcher at Bell Labs, entrepreneur
- Benjamin M. Rosen (1954, Electrical Engineering) – venture capitalist, founder of Sevin Rosen Funds, former chair of Compaq
- William Robert Graham (1959, Physics) – deputy administrator and acting administrator of NASA, director of the White House Office of Science and Technology Policy
- Leland H. Hartwell (1961, Biology) - recipient of the 2001 Nobel Prize in Physiology or Medicine
- Jay Obernolte (1992, Engineering and Applied Science) – Video game developer and politician
- Jeffery M. Mendez (1999, Chemistry) – Caltech Lecturer in Chemistry
- Ryan Patterson (2000, Physics) – Caltech Professor of Physics

=== Ricketts House ===
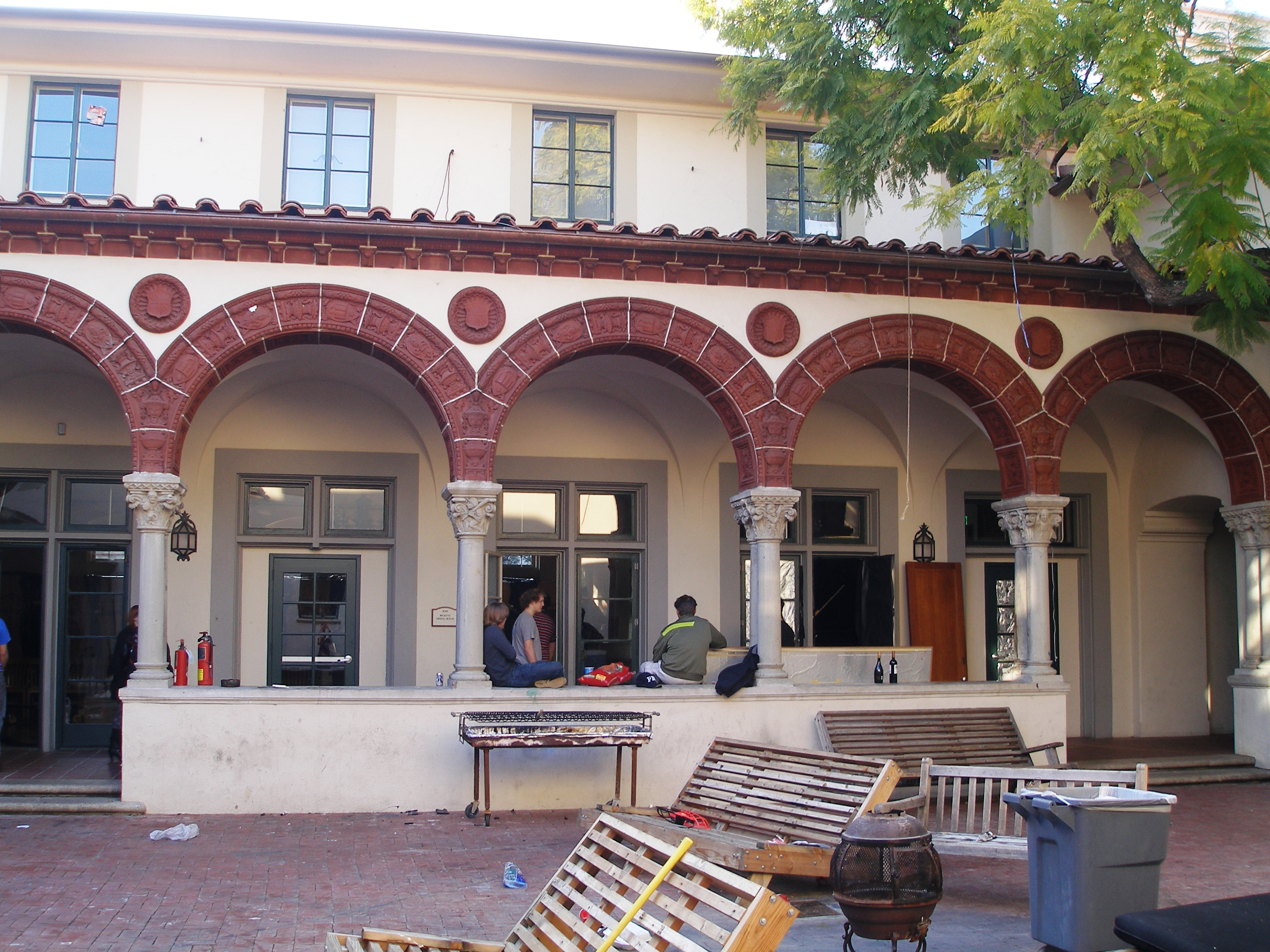
Ricketts courtyard in 2008

Ricketts House was funded by and named for mining engineer L. D. Ricketts. Members of Ricketts House are called Scurves (or Skurves) due to a play on the similarity of the name Ricketts to the disease rickets and the fact that scurvy is another vitamin deficiency disease. Members of Ricketts House were known as Rowdies until about 1960; alumni of that period still draw the distinction between Rowdies and Scurves.

Ricketts traditions include fire-related activities and the brakedrum. Prior to early 2003, the Ricketts courtyard housed a large concrete pot, in which massive fires were often enjoyed during cool Pasadena evenings. The courtyard originally featured a large Italian marble well head (historically attributed to and named "Millikan's Pot"). It was used as a measure for height of serves in the singles and doubles games of four square played in the courtyard. By the mid-1970s, it existed only as chunks of rubble, after destruction in an experiment in more exciting pot fires allegedly involving newspaper, xylene, and matches. Around that time, enterprising house officers arranged for its replacement with a large section of concrete sewer pipe, which was eventually replaced with a concrete facsimile of the original pot. Due to tightening of Pasadena fire codes and the Caltech administration's liability concerns, the pot was removed. A portable fireplace temporarily replaced the pot. The brakedrum is a contest between the freshman class and the sophomore class over ownership of the brakedrum.

Ricketts House was known for athletics and student government in the 1950s, but soon after that they became known less for these activities and more for activities that pushed the motto "Take me as I am" to the limit. Recently, Ricketts had an inverted pentagram on the front wall of its dining room. Administration members called for its removal as it was a symbol that may have offended the general public who viewed the house during tours. The pentagram was originally painted in the dining hall for the Interhouse party of 1989 – prior to this time this symbol had no particular connection to Ricketts House. In later years the inverted pentagram was added to the Ricketts House crest (the original had had ship's wheels instead of pentagrams). During the renovations from 2004 to 2006, the mural was painted over, and a new mural policy was put in place. Conflicts regarding the new mural policy continued until the early 2010s, when the policy was relaxed. The house features a number of murals, including one featuring the cover art of the Grateful Dead's eponymous album that was painted in the 1970s. Today the house hosts a number of social events throughout the year, including a termly open mic night, featuring music performances by students, a termly formal dinner, and an interhouse party known as Apache.

The building has space for approximately 70 students, while the house had a total membership of about 110 at commencement in 2019. Two graduate student resident associates live in apartments in the house.

Ricketts remains the only house not to offer social membership. A referendum to add social membership in 2018 was defeated by vote of 16 in favour, 43 against, and 3 abstentions.

==== Notable Scurves and Rowdies ====
- Leo James Rainwater (1939, Physics) – physicist, Nobel laureate, Pupin Professor of Physics at Columbia University
- Vernon L. Smith (1949, Electrical Engineering) – economist, winner of the Nobel Memorial Prize in Economic Sciences, professor at the University of Arizona, George Mason University, and Chapman University
- Carl V. Larson (1952, Mechanical Engineering) – former vice-president of Versatec, an electrostatic printing company acquired by Xerox
- Alexander J. Dessler (1952, Physics) – astronomer, professor emeritus and inaugural Chair, Department of Space Science at Rice University, Director of the Space Science Laboratory at NASA's Marshall Space Flight Center
- Anthony Leonard (1959) – Theodore von Kármán Professor of Aeronautics, Emeritus, at Caltech
- Bradley Efron (1960, Mathematics) – pre-eminent mathematical statistician, MacArthur award, Presidential Medal of Science
- Cleve Moler (1961, Mathematics) – inventor of Matlab
- Robert McEliece (1964) – Allen E. Puckett Professor and Professor of Electrical Engineering at Caltech
- Michael Baskes (1965) – distinguished research professor, University of North Texas, member of the National Academy of Engineering
- Seth Putterman (1966) – Professor of Physics and Astronomy t the University of California, Los Angeles
- B. Thomas Soifer (1968) – Harold Brown Professor of Physics, Emeritus at Caltech; Director, Spitzer Science Center
- Edward Groth (1968) – professor, Princeton University
- Christopher Dede (1969, Chemistry) – educational researcher, Timothy E. Wirth Professor in Learning Technologies at the Harvard Graduate School of Education
- Howard Zebker (1976, Engineering and Applied Science) – Kwoh Ting Li Professor in the School of Engineering and Professor of Geophysics, Stanford University
- Christopher S. Bretherton (1980) – professor, University of Washington, member of the National Academy of Sciences
- Cecilia Rodriguez (Aragon) (1981) – Programmer, pilot, professor, poet; what's next?
- John Stembridge (1981) – Professor of Mathematics at the University of Michigan
- Mark Jeffrey Rosker (1981) – physicist at DARPA and named IEEE Fellow
- Minami Yoda (1983) – mechanical engineer, Red Cedar Distinguished Professor and Department Chair of Mechanical Engineering at Michigan State University and former chair of the Division of Fluid Dynamics, American Physical Society
- John Fourkas (1986) – Associate Dean for Faculty Affairs and Graduate Education and Millard Alexander Professor of Chemistry, Boston College
- David Nice (1987) – Charles A. Dana Professor of Physics, Lafayette College
- Jeff Greason (1988) – co-founder and the Chief Technologist of Electric Sky, member of the FAA Commercial Space Transportation Advisory Committee
- Joel David Hamkins (1988, Mathematics) - Mathematician and philosopher; O'Hara Professor of Logic, University of Notre Dame; formerly the Sir Peter Strawson Fellow in Philosophy at University College, Oxford and Professor of Logic, University of Oxford; top-rated user on MathOverflow
- Sam Weaver (1989, Engineering and Applied Science) – CEO and co-founder of Cool Energy, former Mayor of Boulder, Colorado
- Paul W. K. Rothemund (1994) – MacArthur Fellow, Research Professor of Bioengineering, Computing and Mathematical Sciences, and Computation and Neural Systems at Caltech
- Edray Herber Goins (1994, Mathematics, Physics) – Mathematician specializing in number theory and algebraic geometry, professor at Purdue University and later Pomona College
- C. Kevin Boyce (1995, Biology, Literature) – MacArthur Fellow, paleobotanist, professor at Stanford University
- Pankaj Mehta (1997, Mathematics) – Sloan Fellow and Simons Investigator, Professor of Physics, Boston University
- Jarah Evslin (1997) – Professor at the Institute of Modern Physics, University of the Chinese Academy of Sciences
- Sham Kakade (1998, Physics) – computer scientist, Gordon McKay Professor in Computer Science at Harvard University
- Amit Kshatriya (2000, Mathematics) – NASA Associate Administrator
- Nicholas R. (Nick) Hutzler (2007, Mathematics) – Assistant Professor of Physics at Caltech
- Kurtis Carsch (2016, Chemistry) – Assistant Professor of Chemistry at the University of Texas at Austin

== North houses ==
=== Lloyd House ===
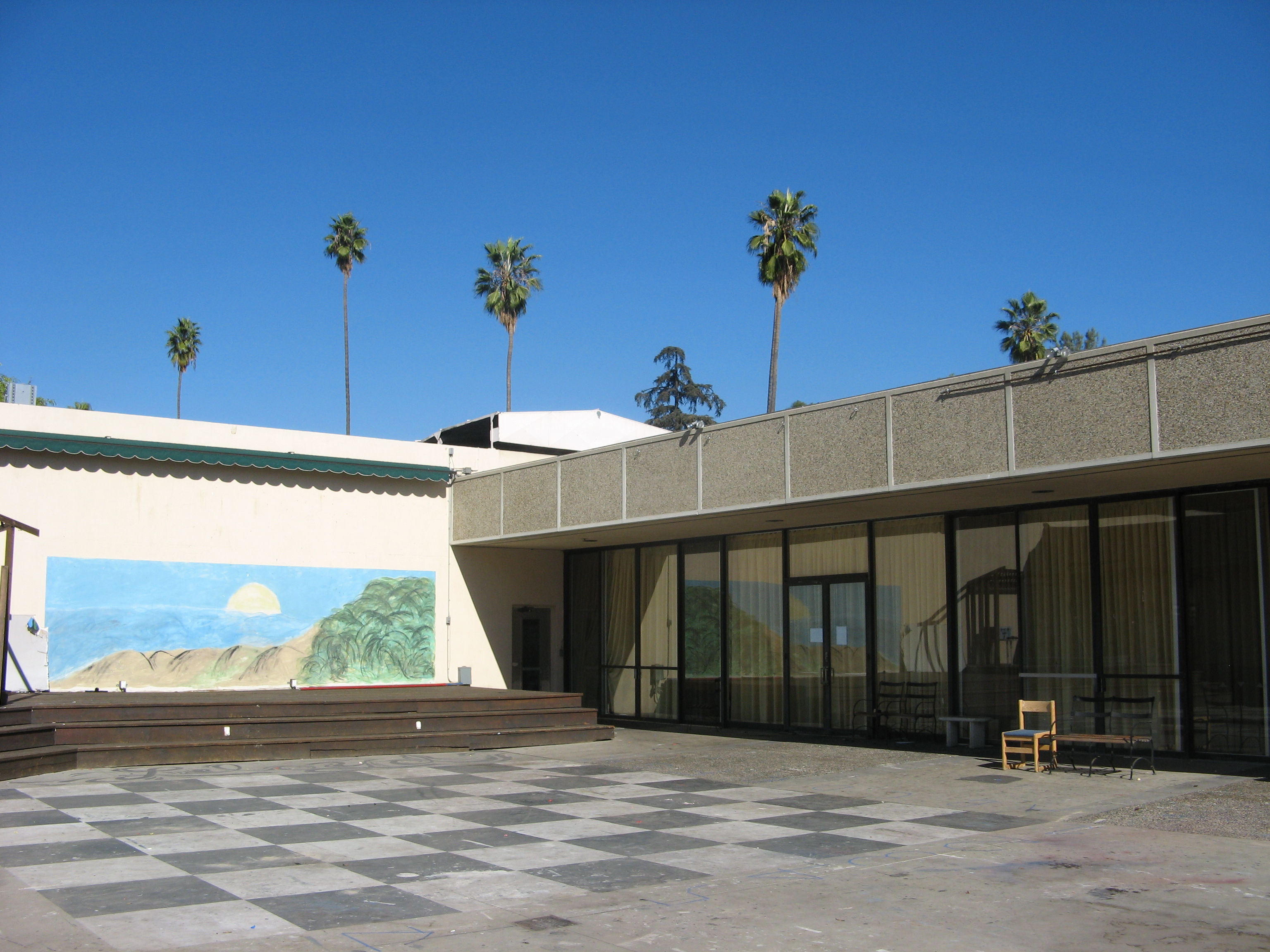
Lloyd courtyard in 2008

Lloyd House is smallest of the three north houses. The north houses were constructed in 1960 with funds provided by the Lloyd Foundation and other donors. Lloyd House was named in memory of Ralph B. Lloyd and his wife, Lulu Hull Lloyd. Mr. Lloyd was a member of the Board of Trustees of Caltech, 1939–1952. Members of Lloyd House are called Lloydies. The house color is gold, and its motto is "I live and die for those I love", popularly corrupted by mis-reading the banner as "I live for those I love and die."

Lloyd House is governed by a student-elected, student-run Executive Committee, or "Excomm," of 9-10 members: President, Secretary, Superintendent, Treasurer, Social Director(s), Athletic Manager, and two representatives at large. The Social Director(s) and Athletic Manager are aided by the Social Team and the Athletic Team. There are seven Lloyd Alley Support Reps (LASRs) and various appointed positions, such as Librarian, Fridgemaster, and Pool Monkey. Traditional house events include a meet-the-frosh Ultimate Frisbee competition, Airband, and Beach Trip (for which some members bike, roller blade, longboard, walk, or even run 42 miles from Caltech to Huntington Beach).

Lloyd House is located along the Olive Walk, and is an L-shaped, two-story building. At the intersection of the two branches of the house are "Lower Crotch" and "Upper Crotch," which serve as communal lounge areas.

Lloyd is divided into seven alleys: Purple, Kaos, VI (Virgin Islands), Fingal's Cave, Valhalla, Inferno, and Tropic. Each alley is decorated with theme-appropriate murals. Some murals include the expansive Purple mural in the theme of Japanese tsunami waves, the Escher mural in Kaos, the tropical mural in VI, the "Enjoy Crack" mural in Inferno that mocks the Coca-Cola slogan and contains a reference to Alan Moore's graphic novel Watchmen, and the Lloyd Dragon in Fingal's. Several of the names have been changes since the 1970s when the names were: Headquarters (now purple), Penthouse (now Kaos), Virgin Islands, Cave (though Fingal still lived in this alley), Valhalla, Inferno and Creek (now Tropic). At this time the alleys were mostly painted solid colors with some minimal designs and pictures (including flames on the walls of Inferno).

The "shed" used to be a stand-alone building in the courtyard that housed Lloyd's big screen TV. Now the "shed" exists indoors, in a room adjacent to Valhalla that used to be part of the MOSH's office.

In the 1980s, Lloyd had two off-campus alleys, one named "The Place" and one named "Corona" (in reference to the corona of the sun as a metaphor for the outer reaches of Lloyd). The Place used to exist on the corner of Michigan Ave and Lura St; it was removed around 1988 and is now a parking lot. Corona used to be on the east side of Holliston Ave; it was removed in 1992 and the location is now the new parking structure. Because of Pasadena preservation laws, both houses were moved to other places in Pasadena. The Corona house was donated to a minister who restored it at 1792 Newport Ave in Pasadena. The house is no longer owned by the minister, but it still exists.

Around 1990, in exchange for the loss of Corona, Lloyd adopted "the Quads" alley at 232, 234, and 236 Chester Ave. (The 232 and 234 addresses were still affiliated with Lloyd House until the opening of the Bechtel Residence, after which they became housing for graduate students.)

==== Lloydies ====
Crippling Depression, a satirical comic strip that was published regularly in the California Tech, the student newspaper, was drawn and written by Lloydies.

In the past, some Lloydies have pulled elaborate pranks. The prank of the 1961 Rose Bowl was pulled off by the "Fiendish Fourteen," members of Lloyd House. Flashcards that were intended to cheer for the Washington Huskies football team were changed to read Caltech. The Hollywood sign was changed to read "Caltech" in 1987 by a group of Pageboys and Lloydies.

Every year since 1994, Lloydies have climbed onto the top of Millikan Library to construct the Lloyd Christmas Tree, a monumental structure of numerous Christmas lights strung together to resemble a 10-story Christmas tree topped with a 12-feet tall "L." During the windstorm of 2013, the L broke apart into pieces, so the Lloydies rebuilt the "L" but replaced it instead with a double "L" that is now 16-feet tall. In 2018, neighbors and the city of Pasadena filed a complaint, as the Lloyd Christmas tree was a religious symbol. The tree is now referred to as the "Lloyd Lights". The latest off-campus pranks have been the pranking of MIT's Campus Preview Weekend, which included many Lloydies.

A folklore that has been passed down throughout the years is that of the Purple LSD lab, also commonly referred to as the "Lloyd Labs" incident. It has been said that sometime in the 1970s, a group of chemistry majors living in Purple blocked off some of the alley for a special project. The product of their project, was dubbed "Lloyd-grade" LSD, to denote its extraordinary purity. The rumor goes that it was one of the largest sources of LSD at the time. Nearly the entire senior class was expelled when the FBI invaded the house (only three seniors are mentioned in the yearbook from 1970), though folklore also holds that the perpetrators escaped capture, leaving only a teasing banner for the invaders reading "Welcome, FBI!"

Notable former Lloydies include:

- Cleve Moler (1961) – inventor of Matlab and one of the original Lloydies (having been "transferred" there from Ricketts House)
- Douglas Osheroff (1967) – Nobel Prize in Physics (1996) for discovery of superfluidity in Helium-3
- Steven E. Koonin (1972) – physicist, Caltech Provost, United States Under Secretary of Energy for Science
- David Brin (1973) – astronomer and science-fiction writer
- Richard Lyon (1974) – inventor
- Kenneth Suslick (1974) – chemist
- Paul Steinhardt (1974) – physicist; winner of Dirac Medal and numerous other prestigious awards
- Joseph Kirschvink (1975) – Nico and Marilyn Van Wingen Professor of Geobiology at Caltech
- Taras Kiceniuk Jr. (1977) – hang-gliding pioneer
- Nathan Lewis (1977) – George L. Argyros Professor of Chemistry at Caltech
- Gary W. Cox (1978) – political scientist; one of only three political scientists to have won twice the George H. Hallett Award
- Schelte J. Bus (1979) – astronomer
- Julia A. Kornfield (1983) – Elizabeth W. Gilloon Professor of Chemical Engineering at Caltech, first woman who earned her bachelor's at Caltech to return as a professor
- Adam Weissman (1990) – co-founder of Applied Semantics, which was bought by Google and became AdSense
- Gil Elbaz (1991) – co-founder of Applied Semantics
- Katie Mack (2003) – astrophysicist and author
- Adam D'Angelo (2006) – founder of Quora and early Facebook CTO

=== Page House ===
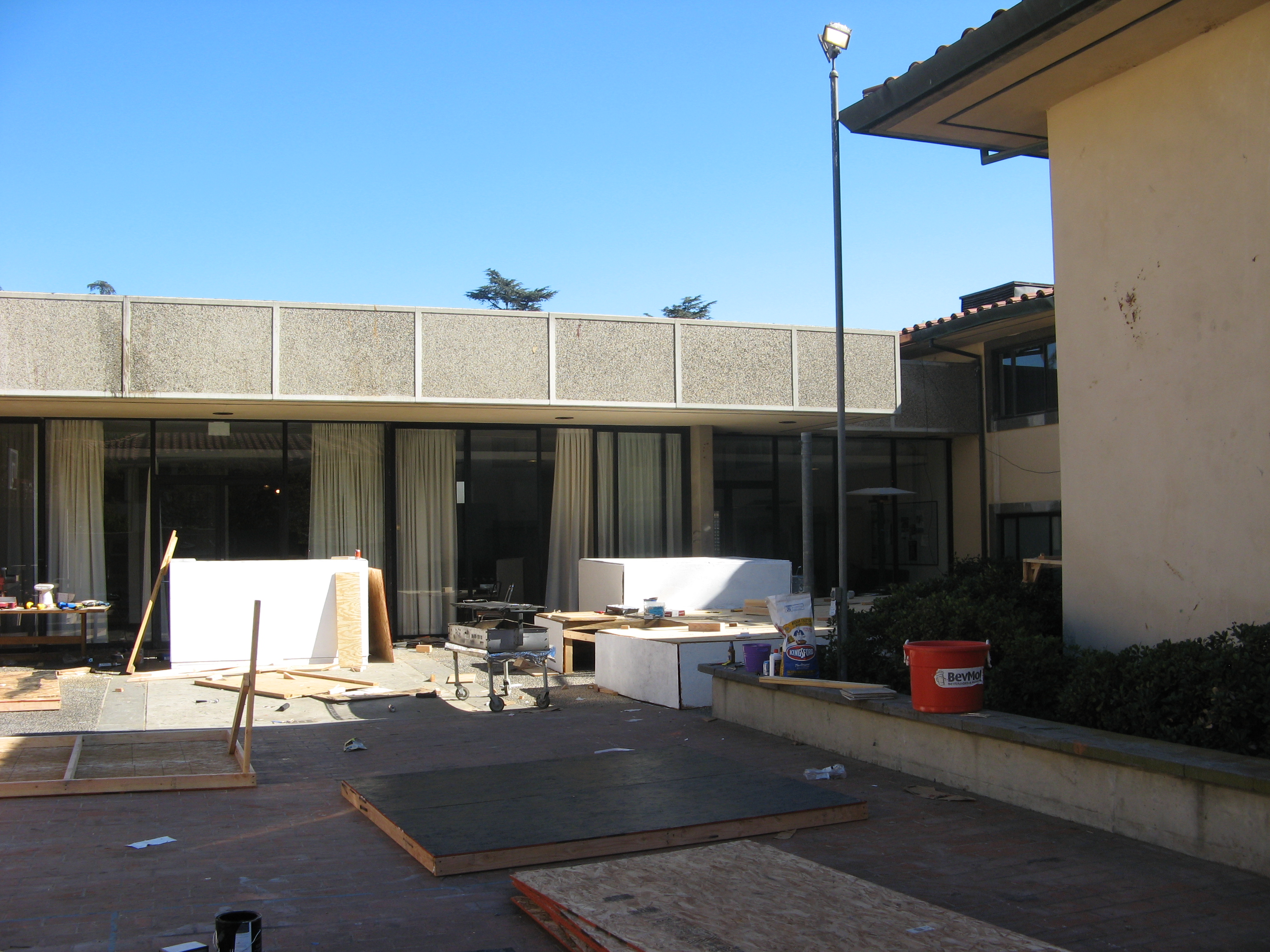
Page courtyard in 2009

Upon the construction of the north houses in the 1960s, members of Ricketts house splintered off to populate the newly constructed Page House. Members of the house are known as Pageboys (even the women), and the house crest includes the "mechanical horse" with a banner reading spe labor levis, a Latin idiom meaning "May the work be light" (and is often followed by "And the drinks be heavy"). House construction was funded by J.R. Page, former vice president of the First National Bank in Los Angeles, and chairman of the Caltech board of trustees from 1943 to 1954. One of the largest houses, Page has been home to KCAL (a pirate ratio station) and the Interhouse Roller Coaster. It also used its access to the basement so that Pageboys could cover the concrete with dry ice, a prank copied in the movie Real Genius.

In response to other houses quixotically claiming certain items to be off-limits in regard to pranks (rendering them "Non-RF-able"), the Page House president at the time named that the President be unprankable as well. In the past, there were two items in Page House that could not be the target of pranks: the pool table felt and a poster of President Nixon that is passed on to each house president shortly after s/he is elected.

All student rooms in Page are designed as doubles; however, when vacancies arise, upperclassmen may live in rooms as singles. According to house bylaws, the newly elected Page House president may choose to reside in any room as a single. The FU, across from the Library, is Page House's entertainment room, complete with dozens of bean bags. Its name originates from a Ditch Day stack in which the resident graduating senior and president painted a large "F" on its door. Rather than painting over it, Pageboys simply painted a "U" below it. The FU was formerly a triple, and before that was the RA apartment, which is now located downstairs. The Library itself is important to Page House culture, and although its collection is always being removed to be recycled, its contents are meant to reflect the works and contributions of contemporary Pageboys. Owing to its distinguished status, one must wear shoes while in the Library. Recently, as a result of pressure from the Deans, the Library underwent renovation, and was reopened after a few weeks.

Pageboy activities include grilling on The Bridge, champagne at Caltech Hall ("Bubbly") to celebrate the end of quarter, and Intrahouse, in which all eight alleys in Page partake in the annual tradition of applying primer and painting edgy, humorous pictures. The painting in between alleys 6 and 7 covers "the fruit wall", a favorite target for PVC-borne projectiles, particularly fruit which tend to vaporize on contact. In addition to Intrahouse, there is the Wait Staff Initiation, and the Greased Frosh Race, in which Pageboys make liberal use of Caltech's grounds and upkeep fund by selecting a designated freshman in each alley (referred to as that alley's Greased Frosh), who is then sent running on the Beckman lawn in the effort to evade upperclassmen who are trying to tackle an opposing alley's Greased Frosh before theirs is tackled. Pageboys then rinse themselves in Gene Pool, producing a visible Crisco and lard film on the surface. Until 2003, they first rinsed in Caltech Hall Pond, but the location has changed owing to administrative request, and now all the Pageboys rinse off completely in the Fleming showers.

Notable alumni include:

- Ron Gregg (1969, Ph.D. 1977) – nuclear physicist who founded Outdoor Research
- Stanley E. Whitcomb (1973) – Chief Scientist at LIGO when gravitational waves were first detected
- Dale Bredesen (1974) – founded Buck Institute for Research on Aging
- Tullis Onstott (1976) – geoscientist who studied geological regimes in which microbes can still live under extreme conditions
- Hal Finney (1979) – software developer who received first bitcoin transaction
- Lance J. Dixon (1982) – Stanford professor at SLAC Theory Group
- Sandra Tsing Loh (1983) – performance artist, radio personality, playwright, author
- Edward Felten (1985) – Princeton Computer Science professor
- Stuart Ray (entered Class of 1986, B.S. Vanderbilt) – Johns Hopkins Professor of Medicine
- Stephen Hsu (1986) – Michigan State Professor of Physics, former university administrator
- Sabeer Bhatia (1991) – co-founded Hotmail

=== Venerable House ===
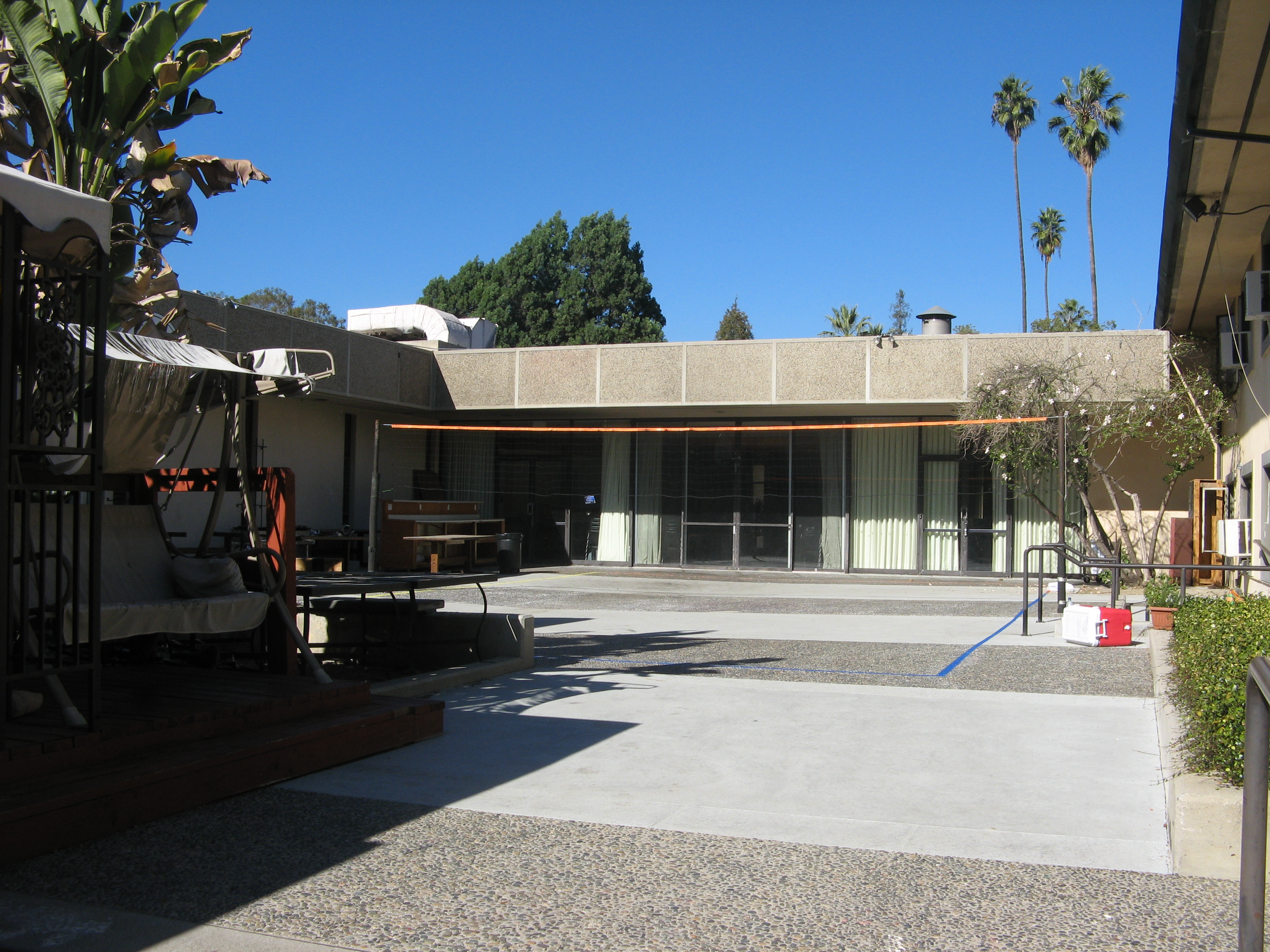
Venerable courtyard in 2008

Grant D. Venerable House, formerly known as Ruddock House, was constructed in 1960 in honor of Albert Billings Ruddock, then the Chairman of the Caltech Board of Trustees. It was renamed in 2021 in honor of Grant Venerable ('32), the first black undergraduate student at Caltech, due to Ruddock's involvement with the Human Betterment Foundation, a eugenics organization.

Approximately 160 Caltech undergraduates are members of the house and approximately 80 reside in the house. Members of the house are known as "Vens" and were formerly nicknamed "Rudds." During the week, student waiters serve family-style dinners in the dining room; some notable dinner traditions include the throwing of bread rolls and "floating" members who break dinner rules by pouring water on them. The hallways, referred to as "alleys" by undergraduates, are adorned with various murals including reproductions of M.C. Escher works, a Monopoly Board, Simpsons characters, and a two-story mural of an astronaut. This mural, called "The Spaceman," is based on a photograph of astronaut Ed White's spacewalk during Gemini 4. The painting was made completely by Phil Cormier ('79) in a day's worth of work. A few years later Rusty Schweickart Jr. (whose father walked in space on Apollo 9) was elected house president. Another Ven connected to the space program is Philip Engelauf ('78), who later became a flight director at Johnson Space Center.

Other Vens include Bill Gross of idealab!, MIT's Peter Shor (1981) – applied mathematician best known for Shor's algorithm in quantum computation, MacArthur Fellow Jim Fruchterman, applied physicist Kerry Vahala, president of several major research universities Eric Kaler, astronomer Tod R. Lauer, computer scientist John Gustafson, energy storage scientist Michael Aziz, click chemist (and possible Nobel candidate) M. G. Finn, and Nobel Prize recipients Eric Betzig (Chemistry 2014) and Michael Rosbash (Physiology/Medicine 2017).

==== OPI ====
After the end of a campus-wide undergraduate party tradition, Interhouse, Venerable began the tradition of OPI. OPI, standing for either "Our Private Interhouse" or "(Our) Own Private Interhouse," traditionally occurs during the winter term of the academic year. One of the most notable aspects of the OPI is the amount of time and effort put into construction and artwork for the sets of the party. The past decade's preparations have included a Mayan temple, the Roman Colosseum, skylines of Tokyo, a giant Egyptian pyramid, a 16-foot tall windmill and 20-foot tall elephant statue from Moulin Rouge, the Hanging Gardens of Babylon, and a Gothic cathedral with 32-foot tall facades.

== Avery House ==
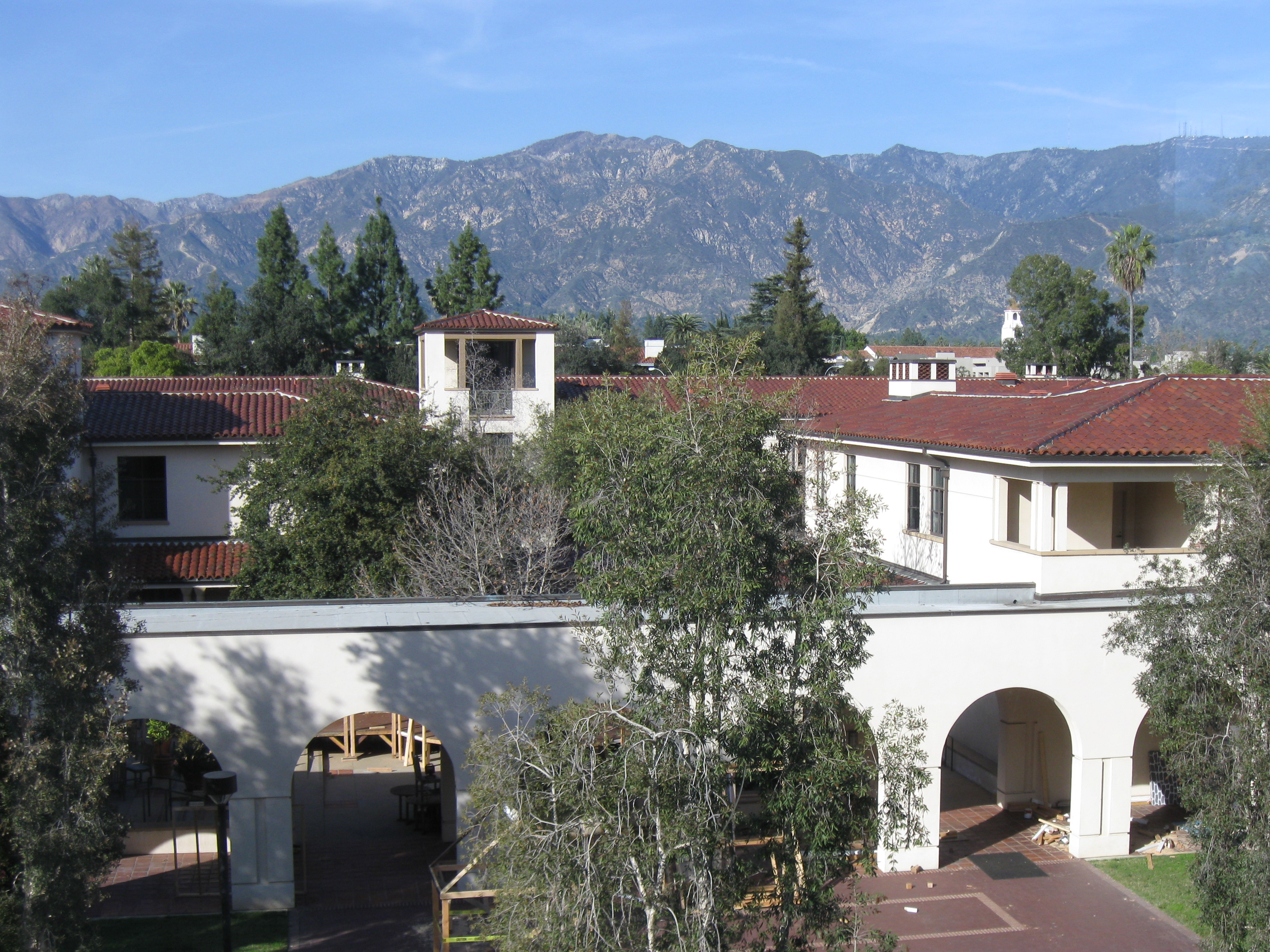
Avery in 2010

Avery House is part of the housing system at Caltech, participating in Rotation and housing undergraduates, yearlong exchange students, faculty, and visiting guests. Avery's members are called "Averites".

Founded in 1991, Avery had previously only housed upperclass students, graduate students, and faculty, but by a 10-to-1 vote in May 2004, the Faculty Board approved the decision to make Avery open to incoming freshmen on a two-year experimental basis. Since the 2005–2006 school year, Avery has been part of the Rotation process and houses incoming freshman.

Some recent traditions include Assery (short for Avery Assassins, game of Assassins using water guns), an Iron Chef competition, and a Faculty Dessert Night with an open talent show. Avery House participates in interhouse sports, holds an annual interhouse party, and organizes annual ski trips, beach trips, and BBQs. In line with its historical position as an alternative option to the house system, Avery embraces an accepting mindset whereby anyone who wants to become an Avery member only needs to attain ten signatures from Avery members who are living in the house or have lived there previously.

Avery enjoys an environment of faculty families. The Faculty in Residence (FiRs) are chosen by the students in an interview and discussion process and the faculty are provided budget to hold social events for the undergraduates of the house. Events held by faculty include Super Bowl parties and casual dinners.

In both physical size and bedspaces, Avery House is noticeably larger than the other houses, housing almost twice as many undergraduates as other houses. Avery House has several facilities, including a dining hall with a large kitchen, a conference room, a piano room (Gary Lorden Recreation Room), a library, a garden, and a basement garage. The dining hall, library, and conference room are available to the Caltech community for official events after approval by the Avery ExComm or reservation via the Housing website. Avery also holds a number of "off-campus" spots, which are physically in the house but can be chosen by any undergraduate participating in the off-campus lottery. Finally, owing to a policy said to have been put in place by R. Stanton Avery himself, Avery members are not allowed to place anything "nonremovable" on the walls, though the true origins of this policy are unclear. As a result, murals are painted on canvas and hung up on bulletin boards, instead of painted on the walls directly.

== Bechtel Residence ==
The Bechtel Residence started construction in late 2016, and began housing undergraduates in Fall 2018. It is by far the largest housing option on campus, at over 200 beds. However, it is not a House, lacking the self-determining political systems, defined membership, and collection of dues like those of the existing 8 houses. Bechtel additionally has apartments for various live-in staff and faculty, specifically a professional staff member called a residential life coordinator, six graduate students employed as Residential Associates (RAs), and two faculty-in-residence.

== Other "off-campus" housing ==
Caltech-owned housing that is not part of any of the eight houses is known as "off-campus" housing, even if it is actually physically located on the Caltech campus (non-Caltech owned housing is called "off-off-campus" or "off-squared"). These housing units do not maintain memberships or have the community or traditions that the other houses have. Off-campus housing besides Bechtel currently consists of Marks House and Braun House. Freshmen will not rotate into these. Historically, before the advent of Bechtel, they included Del Mar apartments, Chester apartments, and a number of "Off-Campus Alleys" (OCAs) nicknamed e.g. Batcave, Fort Knight, Hazard, Munth, ROCAs, and Watchtower. These other resources have now been re-allocated towards graduate student housing.

Until the mid-1980s there were literally off-campus houses for undergraduates at 317 and 360 South Holliston Avenue associated informally and formally, respectively, with Dabney House, the distinction being that rooms in 360 were considered part of the house's yearly, seniority-inflected, room allocation scheme.
