= Rosker =

Rosker is a surname. Notable people with the surname include:

- Jana S. Rošker (born 1960), Slovenian sinologist
- Mark Jeffrey Rosker, American engineer

== See also ==
- Roser (name)
- Rosser (surname)
