= Pankaj Mehta =

American theoretical physicist

- Education: California Institute of Technology; Rutgers University
- Scientific career
- Fields: Biophysics, statistical physics, theoretical ecology, systems biology, hard condensed matter theory
- Workplaces: Boston University; Princeton University
- Academic advisors: Natan Andrei, Ned Wingreen
- Website: physics.bu.edu/~pankajm/

Pankaj Mehta is an American theoretical physicist whose research has involved biophysics, statistical physics, machine learning theory, and hard condensed matter theory. He is a professor of Physics at Boston University.

Mehta has worked on statistical mechanics tools in theoretical community ecology, biological information processing, and cell fate development models. In his work on theoretical ecology, Mehta has described consumer-resource models and statistical physics-based approaches to niche and coexistence theory.

== Education and career ==
Mehta received a B.S. in mathematics from California Institute of Technology in 2000. Mehta then received his PhD in physics from Rutgers University specializing in hard condensed matter physics in 2006 under the supervision of Natan Andrei. He was a postdoctoral scholar at Princeton University's departments of molecular biology and physics where he worked under the supervision of Ned Wingreen from 2006-2010.

In 2010, Mehta became an assistant professor in the Boston University department of physics, later receiving tenure in 2015. At Boston University, he is a member of the Faculty of Computing and Data Sciences. He is an affiliate faculty member of Boston University's Department of Biomedical Engineering, Center for Regenerative Medicine, and Biological Design Center. He is a Fellow of the American Physical Society.

== Honors ==
- Fellow of the American Physical Society, nominated by the Division of Biological Physics (2023), for "creative and impactful use of statistical mechanics tools in addressing a broad range of problems, from biological information processing and microbial ecology to machine learning theory."
- Simons Investigator in the Mathematical Modeling of Living Systems (2014)
- Scialog Fellow, Molecules Come to Life (2014)
- Gerald and Deanne Gitner Family Innovation in Teaching Award (2014)
- Alfred P. Sloan Research Fellowship (2011)

== Publications ==
- Mehta P, Wang CH, Day AG, Richardson C, Bukov M, Fisher CK, Schwab DJ (May 2019). "A high-bias, low-variance introduction to Machine Learning for physicists". Phys Rep. 810: 1–124. arXiv:1803.08823. Bibcode:2019PhR...810....1M. doi:10.1016/j.physrep.2019.03.001. PMC 6688775. PMID 31404441.
- Mehta, Pankaj; Schwab, David (14 October 2014). "An exact mapping between the Variational Renormalization Group and Deep Learning". arXiv:1410.3831 [stat.ML]. See Quanta and Wired magazines.
- Wenping Cui, Robert Marsland III, Pankaj Mehta (8 March 2024). "Les Houches Lectures on Community Ecology: From Niche Theory to Statistical Mechanics". arXiv:2403.05497 [q-bio.PE]. From Les Houches School of Physics.
- Mehta, Pankaj; Schwab, David J. (October 8, 2012). "Energetic costs of cellular computation". Proceedings of the National Academy of Sciences of the United States of America. 109 (44): 17978–17982. arXiv:1203.5426. Bibcode:2012PNAS..10917978M. doi:10.1073/pnas.1207814109. PMC 3497803. PMID 23045633.
- Mehta, Pankaj; Goyal, Sidhartha; Long, Tao; Bassler, Bonnie L; Wingreen, Ned S (17 November 2009). "Information processing and signal integration in bacterial quorum sensing". Molecular Systems Biology. 5 (1): 325. doi:10.1038/msb.2009.79. PMC 2795473. PMID 19920810.
- Fisher, Charles K.; Mehta, Pankaj (August 25, 2014). "The transition between the niche and neutral regimes in ecology". Proceedings of the National Academy of Sciences of the United States of America. 111 (36): 13111–13116. arXiv:1308.2969. Bibcode:2014PNAS..11113111F. doi:10.1073/pnas.1405637111. PMC 4246938. PMID 25157131.
- Wenping, Cui; Marsland, Robert; Mehta, Pankaj (21 July 2020). "Effect of Resource Dynamics on Species Packing in Diverse Ecosystems". Physical Review Letters. 125 (4) 048101. arXiv:1911.02595. Bibcode:2020PhRvL.125d8101C. doi:10.1103/PhysRevLett.125.048101. PMC 8999492. PMID 32794828. See Physics (magazine).
