= Detroit Copper Mining Company of Arizona =

Company

- Type: Private
- Industry: Copper mining
- Founded: 1872
- Founder: E. B. Ward and William Church
- Defunct: 1917
- Headquarters: Morenci, Arizona
- Area served: United States
- Key people: William E. Dodge, Jr., Daniel Willis James, James Douglas
- Products: Copper
- Parent: Phelps Dodge after 1897. Freeport-McMoRan after 2007.

The Detroit Copper Mining Company was an American copper mining and smelting operation based in Morenci, Arizona. Incorporated in July 1872, it existed as an independent company until 1897, when a controlling interest in the company was purchased by the predecessor of the Phelps Dodge Corporation. It continued to exist as a subsidiary of Phelps Dodge & Co until 1917, when all Phelps Dodge operations in the area were consolidated into the new Phelps Dodge Corporation, Morenci Branch.

== History ==
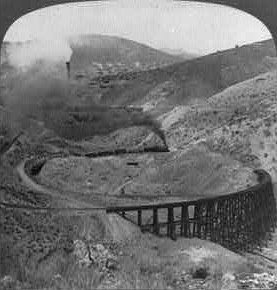
Morenci copper mines, circa 1903.

Prospectors had searched this mineralized Clifton-Morenci region for a decade before staking claims to what would become the central holdings of Capt. Eber Brock Ward, a wealthy steamboat owner from Detroit, Michigan, who organized the Detroit Copper Mining Co with Miles Joy as manager. Ward died January 2, 1875, in Detroit before substantial work began. His managers did patent the richest claims, the Arizona Central, Copper Mountain, Montezuma, and Yankee.

In the late 1870s William Church, a mine speculator from Denver, Colorado, negotiated the purchase of the company stock. Church became the true father of the camp. . With a loan from the partners in Phelps, Dodge, during 1882 he erected furnaces, opened the mines, and began shipping copper east. As a reflection of frontier conditions of the times, he was attacked by Apaches at his smelter in 1882, and twice robbed at gunpoint in his office during the early 1880s. On the advice of Dr. James Douglas (businessman), consultant for Phelps Dodge, the smelter was relocated from the San Francisco River to the mines. The first concentrator was built and a "baby" gauge railroad connected the DCC mines with the transport system of the neighboring Arizona Copper Company, which connected to the transcontinental Southern Pacific Railroad. Church had made his DCC into one of the early, respectable copper operations in the territory. In 1897, he sold his 55% interests in the DCC to Phelps Dodge for a reported $800,000, retired to his stone mansion in Denver's capitol hill neighborhood, and earned a reputation as philanthropist and real estate baron.

James Douglas became president and general manager of the operation for Phelps Dodge, which increased the DCC capital stock from $500,000 to one million dollars, and over the next four years greatly expanded DCC operations with a new rail connection, concentrator, and improved, rebuilt smelter. Metallurgist and Douglas protege, Dr. L.D. Ricketts designed the 600 ton Yankee concentrator, one of the most innovative of the time, and the first of many modern, ever enlarging plants built in the district (steel beams with iron sheeting, Wilfley tables, vanners and jigs for gravity concentration, which could work ores under 3% copper). The Morenci Southern narrow gauge railroad, completed in 1901, connected the mines via five loops over itself in the 18 miles of rails down the mountainside to a junction with the New Mexico & Arizona line. A network of "baby" gauge railroad tracks connected the mine works, plants, and the Morenci Southern. Under Dr. Douglas, the smelter was rebuilt with five blast furnaces and Bessemer converters which produced a purer copper for the market. At its peak, Detroit Copper Co. consisted of 145 mining claims at Morenci.

Detroit Copper Co. founded the town of Morenci (originally named Joy's camp after Ward's first local manager) to supply housing and services to workers employed by the company. After a devastating fire in 1897, Morenci was relocated three quarters of a mile down the canyon. DCC managers organized the Morenci Improvement Company to help rebuild the town and construct better housing. In time, DCC or the improvement company owned a large store, a hotel, and considerable amounts of additional property in the town of Morenci. DCC also funded a free public library, gymnasium and improved schools for workers and their families. At the beginning of the twentieth century the town of Morenci had distinctive southwestern architecture, with Spanish mission style and rustic stone buildings used by the company around a central camp plaza. (The original "Hell's Half Acre" of saloons and brothels were re-built away from the plaza). DCC also established a water pumping plant on the San Francisco River seven miles away. The nearby smelter town of Clifton was settled to provide additional housing, and eventually eclipsed the camp becoming Greenlee county seat.

The company employed mostly Mexican miners, who were paid about half what Caucasian miners earned. During the Church era, Mexican miners were paid with company script, or paper "boletas, which could only be spent at the company store, a base for contention between miners and the company. The boleta system was eased out after the DCC was acquired by Phelps Dodge. As with many mines in Arizona and New Mexico at the time, the Detroit Copper Co. saw several waves of labor union organizing as well as strikes from 1900 onward. DCC used labor spies to infiltrate nascent unions and stop organizing campaigns.

A significant problem in early copper camps were disputes over ownership of ore bodies based on the 1872 Mining Law's "rule of the apex." This was defined where the company which owned the apex (or outcrop) of an ore body could mine ore across mine claim boundaries following vein "dips, spurs, and angles”. Church was able to avoid a potential lawsuit with neighboring claim holders by agreeing to ignore the rule of the apex and use British common law, whereby the companies extracted ore from only within their claim boundaries. In May 1882, Church's company agreed to co-develop the "Detroit lode" with the Longfellow Copper Mining Company (later purchased by the Arizona Copper Company). Although federal and state law provided that the company which accessed the lode had the right to develop the entire deposit, Detroit Copper lacked the capital to do so and agreed to permit Longfellow Copper to mine the lode as well, up to their agreed claim boundaries. This shift away from the rule of the apex to common law was followed later in other Arizona copper districts, most notably at Bisbee, Arizona.

After the 1917 reorganization of the Phelps Dodge & Co holding company into the Phelps Dodge Corporation, the Detroit Copper Company ceased to exist. The operation was then known as "Phelps Dodge Corporation, Morenci Branch." In 1921, Phelps Dodge acquired the mines of the adjacent Arizona Copper Company, Ltd, creating a world class copper operation, which is now one of the largest copper producers in the United States.
