= Natan Andrei =

American theoretical physicist

Natan Andrei is an American theoretical physicist who deals with solid state physics and particle physics. He is a distinguished professor at Rutgers University.

Andrei received his doctorate in 1979 from Princeton University under supervision of David Gross. In 1989 he was at the Institute for Advanced Study. In 2004 he became a Fellow of the American Physical Society. Independently of Paul Wiegmann, he succeeded in 1980 in finding the exact solution of the Kondo problem. In 2017, both were awarded the Lars Onsager Prize. With John H. Lowenstein, he solved the Chiral Gross–Neveu model using Bethe ansatz technique.

He deals with the relations between conformal and exactly integrable field theories and string theory in loop space. In solid state physics, he is primarily concerned with highly correlated electron systems (high-temperature superconductors, quantum Hall effect, heavy fermion systems).

== Publications ==
- Andrei, N.; Furuya, K.; Lowenstein, J. H. (1983-04-01). "Solution of the Kondo problem". Reviews of Modern Physics. 55 (2). American Physical Society (APS): 331–402. Bibcode:1983RvMP...55..331A. doi:10.1103/revmodphys.55.331. ISSN 0034-6861.
- Andrei, N. (1980-08-04). "Diagonalization of the Kondo Hamiltonian". Physical Review Letters. 45 (5). American Physical Society (APS): 379–382. Bibcode:1980PhRvL..45..379A. doi:10.1103/physrevlett.45.379. ISSN 0031-9007.
