= Dabney Oil Syndicate =

Petroleum-drilling in California, US

The Dabney Oil Syndicate refers to a number of petroleum-drilling enterprises in California involving Joseph B. Dabney and his associates.

== History ==
=== Dabney Oil Company ===
Joseph Benjamin Dabney, born 1858 in Madison County, Iowa, was in California at the turn of the 20th century when interest was being awakened in the possibilities of drilling for oil.

In 1900, E. J. (Emmor Jerome) Miley sold his fruit holdings and joined with Dabney in leasing a tract in the McKittrick district in the San Joaquin Valley. Ten oil wells were drilled the first year. In May 1901, the Dabney Oil Company was incorporated with capitalization of $1 million, and the two sold their holdings to the corporation.

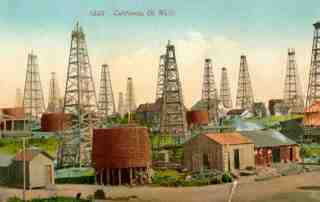
California oil wells, 1913

Frank H. Powers, partner in the law firm of Heller & Powers, with offices at Montgomery and Pine in San Francisco, California, became the secretary of Dabney Oil Company, Inc., at 330 Pine Street.

=== Hidalgo Oil Company ===
In 1913, Miley, Dabney, and Ralph B. Lloyd formed the Hidalgo Oil Company to drill for oil in Simi Valley, California, near the ranch owned by the Ventura Land & Water Company, the family firm of Lewis M. Lloyd and his children. At the time, Ralph B. Lloyd, one of the children, was operating the ranch, and persuaded Dabney and Miley to drill four wells in the area. All of them were dry or failed to sustain production.

Miley and Dabney sold their interest in Hidalgo a year later. For his part, Miley would continue to drill wells for Dabney and Lloyd, as State Consolidated Oil Company.

=== State Consolidated ===
State Consolidated, formed by Miley and others in March 1911, and capitalized at $1.25 million, did rather well in Kern County, California, and by 1920 was operating 33 producing wells there. Dabney would become one of the most prominent small operators of the Los Angeles basin with the discovery of oil at Signal Hill, California. Between his Dabney Oil corporation and his Joseph B. Dabney and Company partnership, he was operating 17 producing wells by 1920.

Despite their lack of success in the Simi Valley, Ralph Lloyd convinced Dabney to lease much of the ranch lands that lay on either side of the Ventura River and adjacent to the city of Ventura, California. Lloyd had attended the University of California, where his study of geology confirmed his belief that his family's ranch, and those around it, lay atop a vast oil pool. When Lewis Lloyd sold his 4,500 acres (18 km^{2}) of pasture that straddled the Ventura River in 1903, Lloyd convinced his father to retain the mineral rights. It proved to be a wise decision.

State Consolidated drilled three wells on this property and another on the adjacent Louis Hartman ranch, but Miley's drilling crews were unable to cope with the enormous gas pressures that they encountered. Indeed, one well blew out. Dabney and Lloyd decided to bring in a major company with the financial resources and technology to handle the area's difficult geology and steep terrain. On 12 June 1916, they signed an agreement with Shell Company of California, a subsidiary of Royal Dutch Shell, covering more than 9,000 acres.

Lloyd and four other landowners in the area received the industry standard 12.5% royalty on leases. Dabney and Lloyd received an overriding royalty on each lease covered by the agreement.

Lloyd thought he had an exclusive right to negotiate leases for Shell; Shell thought otherwise. When they went directly to Southern California Edison to negotiate a lease, Lloyd felt betrayed.

=== Associated Oil Company ===
Associated Oil logo, 1932

Subsequently, Lloyd and Dabney turned to the Associated Oil Company, another California major, offering an option in their "as yet unproven" part of the Ventura field. In February 1920, they and State Consolidated gave an option on 1,500 acres (6 km^{2}) to Associated Oil for $30,000. Associated gave them an additional $20,000 for materials and labor incurred in redrilling Lloyd No. 3 during the option period.

When Associated took up the option, they paid another $200,000 for a lease that provided a 20% royalty and one-third of the oil produced, plus an additional 30% that started after Associated had recovered the $250,000 it had paid for option and lease, and ended after the 30% gave Dabney-Lloyd and State Consolidated $500,000. After that, Associated only paid a 20% royalty. The Lloyd lease proved to be one of the most lucrative in the field.

The lease also required that Associated drill so-called offset wells, to prevent draining from adjacent leases. This was part of the strategy of Dabney and Lloyd to develop the field in an "orderly" manner. Indeed, both Associated and Shell cooperated in maximizing the long-term output of the field, which to date has produced almost one billion barrels of crude oil.

The breakthrough in production came in January 1925, with the completion of Associated's "Lloyd" No. 9-A. Royalties from production over the next few years made Dabney and Lloyd wealthy men. For instance, "Lloyd" No. 9-A generated $378,000 total production in its first two months alone.

=== Goleta Oil Dome Company and Miley Oil Company ===
In April 1927, Dabney and several others incorporated the Goleta Oil Dome Company, capitalized at $1 million, for the purpose of exploring the Tecolote district in the Goleta area of south Santa Barbara County, California. Miley, too, searched for oil in this area as well. Indeed, his Miley Oil Company discovered the minor Goleta field in February 1927. Rapid encroachment of water forced Miley and other operators to abandon their wells eighteen months later. Both Dabney and Miley were shut out of the much more lucrative Elwood field, which was discovered in June 1928 near the coast, due south of the Goleta field.

Joseph Dabney died in 1932.

In 1933, Miley pleaded guilty to a misdemeanor violation of the California Corporate Securities Act in connection with his promotion of the Miley Petroleum Exploration Company, a subsidiary of the Miley Oil Company, and was sentenced to one year in jail.

== Raymond Chandler ==
Raymond Chandler came to work for the Dabney Oil syndicate in 1922 as a bookkeeper and auditor in their Signal Hill (Los Angeles) office. He rose to office manager and vice-president, but was fired in 1932 for drinking, womanizing, and absenteeism. Because he had testified for them in a trial, two of his friends from the oil business offered him $100/month for living expenses. He spent the next year honing his writing skills, and became a master of pulp fiction, turning the hard-boiled detective novel into an art form.

== College philanthropy ==
Joseph B. Dabney was a trustee of California Institute of Technology.

Dabney Hall of the Humanities, a gift of Mr. and Mrs. Dabney, is one of the four corner buildings of Caltech's central courtyard. It was built in 1927.

In 1928, the Dabneys gave $200,000 to build Dabney House, one of four new residence halls.
