= Grant Venerable =

African American graduate of Caltech

Grant D. Venerable was the first African-American graduate of the California Institute of Technology, earning a BS in engineering in 1932. He entered Caltech in 1929, as a transfer student from UCLA. An undergraduate residence hall at Caltech was named after him in 2021.
