= Minami Yoda =

American mechanical engineer

Minami Yoda is an American mechanical engineer and the chairperson of mechanical engineering at Michigan State University. Her research concerns experimental fluid dynamics, with applications ranging from fusion power to nanofluidics, and including the measurement of fluid flows using the evanescent field.

== Education and career ==
Yoda graduated from the California Institute of Technology in 1985, and completed her Ph.D. at Stanford University in 1989. Her dissertation, The instantaneous concentration field in the self-similar region of a high Schmidt number round jet, was supervised by Lambertus Hesselink.

After postdoctoral research at Technische Universität Berlin, she joined the Georgia Tech faculty in 1995. At Georgia Tech, she was the principal investigator of the Fluids, Optical and Interfacial Diagnostics Lab. She served as chair of the American Physical Society Division of Fluid Dynamics for 2019–2020.

== Recognition ==
Yoda was named a Fellow of the American Society of Mechanical Engineers in 2008. She became a Fellow of the American Physical Society (APS) in 2012, after being nominated by the APS Division of Fluid Dynamics, "for outstanding contributions to experimental fluid dynamics and optical diagnostics and, specifically, for innovative contributions to the development of evanescent-wave illumination techniques to study flows in near-wall regions".
