= Arthur H. Fleming =

American philanthropist (1856–1940)

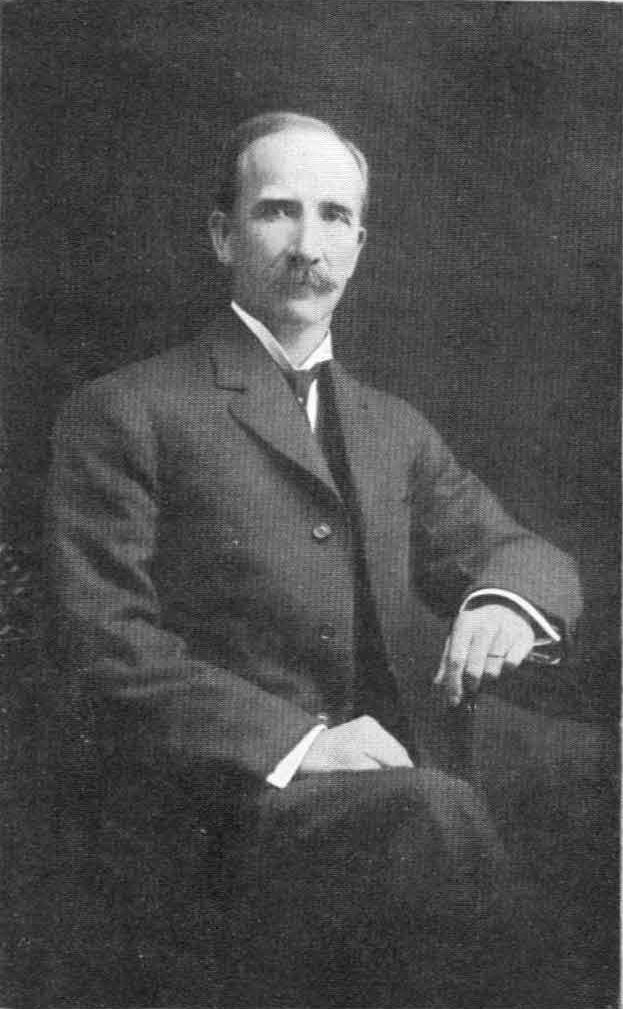
Arthur H. Fleming in 1920

Arthur Samuel Henry Fleming was born on 11 May 1856 in the Town of Milton, Trafalgar Township, Canada West. He died on August 11, 1940, at his home in South Pasadena, California, United States of America.

"Samuel" was his father's name and appears only on the Birth Registry.

He was a successful Canadian-American lumber operator in the western United States of America around the turn of the 20th century and is best known as a philanthropist who, with his daughter, gave more than $5,000,000 to the California Institute of Technology (Caltech). Fleming House at Caltech is named in his honor. Fleming also funded the construction of a World War I memorial in Compiègne to house the railroad car in which the 1918 Armistice with Germany was signed. The railcar was later seized by Nazi Germany in 1940.

Fleming held many positions of authority. During World War I he served as chief of the state councils section of the Council of National Defense. In the 1920s, he was president of the California Institute of Technology, Sugar Pine Lumber Company, and the Madera Sugar Pine Lumber Company; a director of Southern California Edison; and vice-president of the Minarets and Western Railroad.
