= L. D. Ricketts =

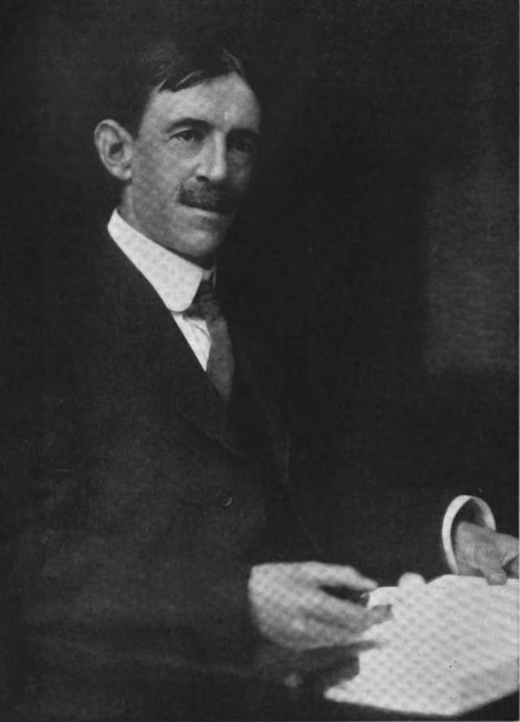
- Born: Louis Davidson Ricketts; December 19, 1859; Elkton, Maryland
- Died: March 4, 1940 (aged 80); Pasadena, California
- Education: Princeton University
- Occupations: Scientist, banker
- Spouse: Kate Bruce Greenway (m. 1916)

Louis Davidson Ricketts (December 19, 1859 – March 4, 1940) was an American economic geologist, metallurgist, mining engineer and banker who pioneered development of copper mines in the U.S. state of Arizona and the Mexican state of Sonora.

== Early career ==
Ricketts was born in Elkton, Maryland on December 19, 1859. He was educated at Princeton University, earning both a B.Sc. (1881) and D.Sc. (1883), being a Fellow in Chemistry and a Fellow in Economic Geology. He then went to Colorado and began at the bottom in Leadville as mine surveyor and assayer, then foreman of a short-lived mine operation near Silverton, Colorado, and, finally, as a consultant and expert witness on geology for mine lawsuits in Leadville, Aspen and elsewhere. In 1887-1890 he served as Geologist for Wyoming Territory. In 1890 he was recruited by Dr. James Douglas of Phelps Dodge (PD) and began his long mining career in the Southwest borderlands.

His first years were filled with more failures than successes. In 1891, Douglas appointed Ricketts manager of the Commercial Mining Company (Phelps Dodge owned) to introduce the Southwest's first Hunt-Douglas process leaching plant at Copper Basin, near Prescott. It burned down, a premature test of hydrometallurgy. The company, backed by Phelps Dodge, also acquired claims adjacent and above the rich United Verde mine at Jerome. Here too Ricketts failed to find profitable ore. Similarly, at Globe, efforts to open several claims for the Phelps Dodge proved marginal. In 1893, he returned to Silverton, Colorado invested in a silver mine, built a mill, and went bankrupt. The failure educated him not to build a costly mill before opening an ore reserve large enough to pay the bills, let alone make a profit. By the mid-1890s, Ricketts was rehired by Douglas and sent to northern Sonora, Mexico, with hopes of finding copper properties.

== Nacozari, Sonora, Mexico and Morenci, Arizona with PD ==
In 1897, Ricketts recommended that Phelps Dodge buy the then-small Pilares mine in northern Sonora from the Guggenheim family. Douglas put him in charge of redeveloping the property, in what became probably the first attempt to mine a porphyry copper deposit by mass methods. As first manager of The Moctezuma Copper Company, Ricketts planned and constructed a modern mine, concentrator, smelter and townsite, connected by railroad. The plant was innovative in that it was constructed of steel frame, and the works powered by electricity. By 1901, when he left the company, the Pilares mine was a profitable, low-cost copper producer, mining ore with less than 3% copper, a record at the time. Also he had gained maturity as a mine manager and had become a sought after metallurgist.

In this same time period, Ricketts designed another modern copper concentrator for the Detroit Copper Mining Company of Arizona (another Phelps Dodge controlled company) at Morenci, Arizona, and invested in what became the Valley National Bank, one of the first substantial banks in Arizona. Ricketts continued to serve as a Valley Bank executive for the rest of his life.

== Preeminent consultant metallurgist ==
In 1901, he opened office as a consultant and became legendary for his designs of major metallurgical works during the early twentieth century copper boom. Over the next decade and a half, Ricketts designed new smelters and/or concentrators, for example, at Old Dominion copper mine at Globe, Arizona (Phelps Dodge controlled), for the Copper Queen (Phelps Dodge) at Douglas and Bisbee, at Miami, at Cananea, and at Clifton, plus a coal washing plant for Phelps Dodge at Dawson, New Mexico. During this period, he also served as president and general manager of the Anaconda interests at Cananea, Sonora, rebuilding its metallurgical works. Since 1907, Arizona copper mines have produced over half the nation's copper, much of the first three decades of this copper was processed through mills designed by Ricketts. On November 18, 1915, because of his work in developing the state's mineral resources, the governor of Arizona honored Ricketts with a medal and special ceremony at the Panama-Pacific Exposition, San Francisco, as the "most distinguished citizen of Arizona."

Ricketts' most significant metallurgical innovations came in the 1910s. As a consulting engineer for the Inspiration copper mine and International smelter in Miami, Arizona (1912–1915), owned by Anaconda, he introduced the first froth flotation plant at a major copper works. Also significant was his work, with John Campbell Greenway, in developing the innovative copper-leaching technology with electrolytic refining for ore from the New Cornelia mine at Ajo, Arizona (1911-1916). At Ajo, his fortune was made. With help of staffs of chemists this leaching technology was adopted at other works, such as his introduction of the process at Inspiration, and was a direct descendant of his work for Dr. Douglas in 1891. This process is the basis for all modern leaching (or solvent) processes used in copper mines around the world. He later flirted with California oil projects, Chilean copper mines, and Chihuahua, Mexico railroads and silver-lead mines, but his great works had been completed.

== Recognitions ==
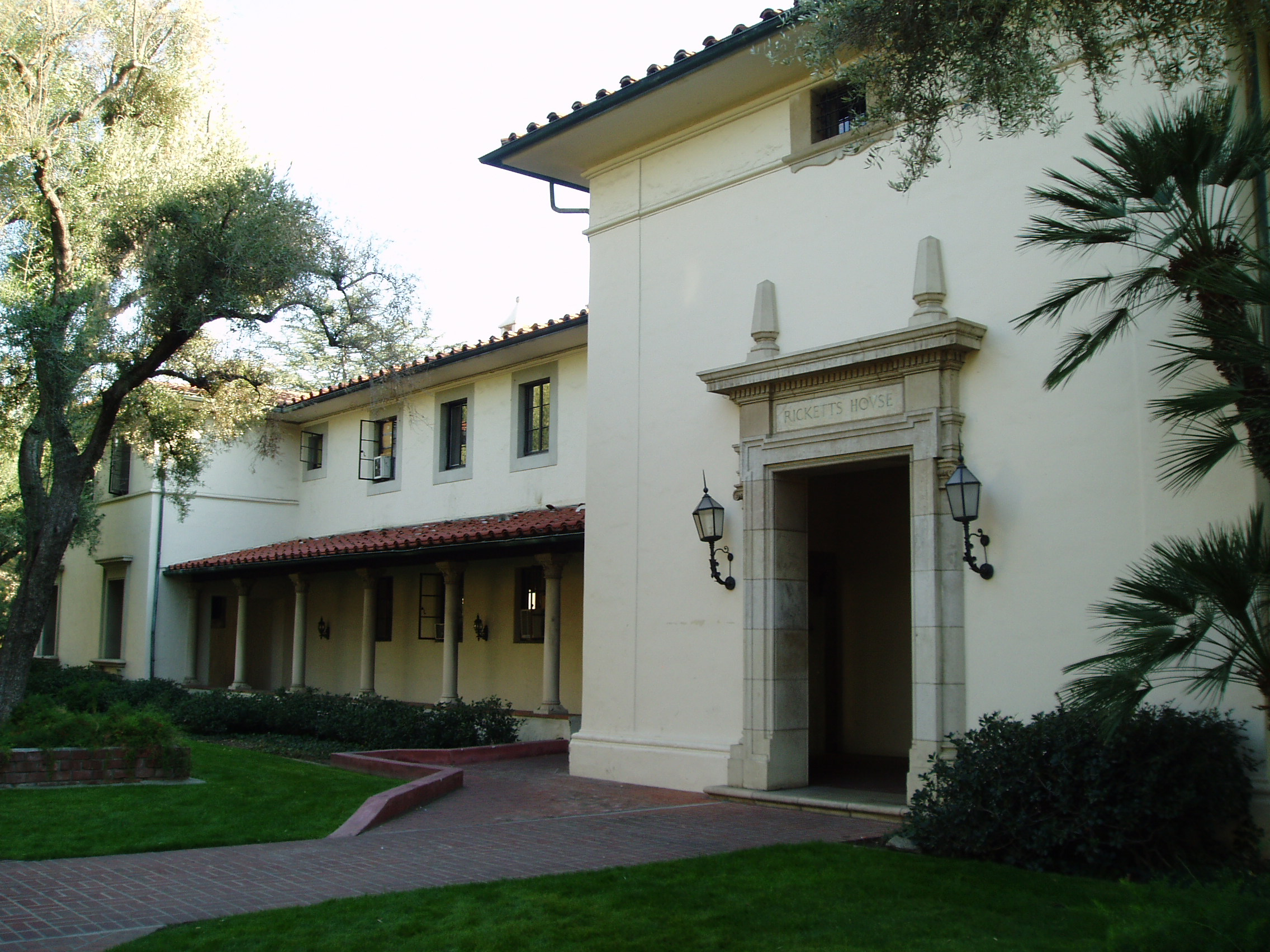
Ricketts House at Caltech was funded by and named for mining engineer L. D. Ricketts.

In 1916, he was recognized for his contributions by his election as president of the American Institute of Mining Engineers. Earlier, in 1910, he had been recognized with the gold medal from the Institution of Mining and Metallurgy, Great Britain. He received the degree of L.L.D. from the University of Arizona in 1916, and doctor of engineering from Princeton in 1925. He was elected a Trustee to Princeton, where he maintained a home for his mother and sister (formerly the home of friend, President Woodrow Wilson), and was a donor to and served as trustee of Caltech. In 1940 he was awarded the gold medal, named after his mentor James Douglas, of the American Institute of Mining, Metallurgical and Petroleum Engineers.

== Personal ==
Ricketts suffered a serious illness in 1917. While he did recover, and resumed his consulting practice, he did not undertake any major new projects. He retired to Pasadena, California, where he died in 1940. He retained his connection with Arizona, being chairman of the Valley National Bank, Phoenix, and a director of Phelps Dodge at the time of his death.

In 1916, Ricketts married Kate Bruce Greenway, widow of his partner John C. Greenway's brother. They had no children. His brother, Palmer C. Ricketts, was president of Rensselaer Polytechnic Institute.

== See also ==
- Ricketts House at Caltech
