= Mark Jeffrey Rosker =

Mark Jeffrey Rosker is a physicist at the Defense Advanced Research Projects Agency (DARPA) in Arlington, Virginia. He was named a Fellow of the Institute of Electrical and Electronics Engineers (IEEE) in 2012 for his work on microwave and millimeter-wave phased arrays, gallium nitride semiconductors, and terahertz electronics.
