= Campus of the California Institute of Technology =

College campus in Pasadena, California, US

Coordinates: 34.138°N 118.125°W

Caltech's 124-acre (50 ha) primary campus is located in Pasadena, California, approximately 11 miles (18 km) northeast of downtown Los Angeles. It is within walking distance of Old Town Pasadena and the Pasadena Playhouse District and therefore the two locations are frequent getaways for Caltech students.

== Campus history ==
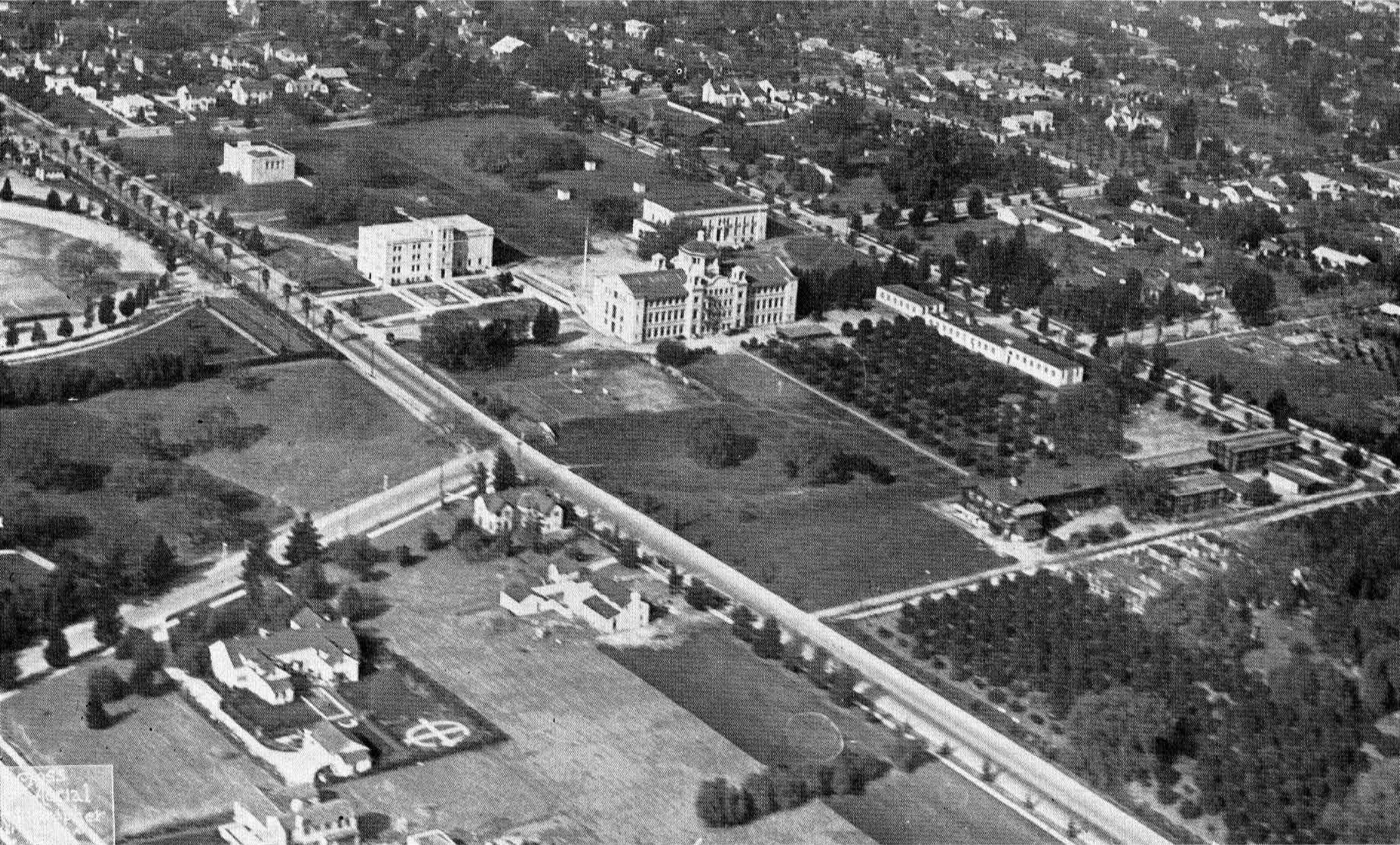
The campus in 1922

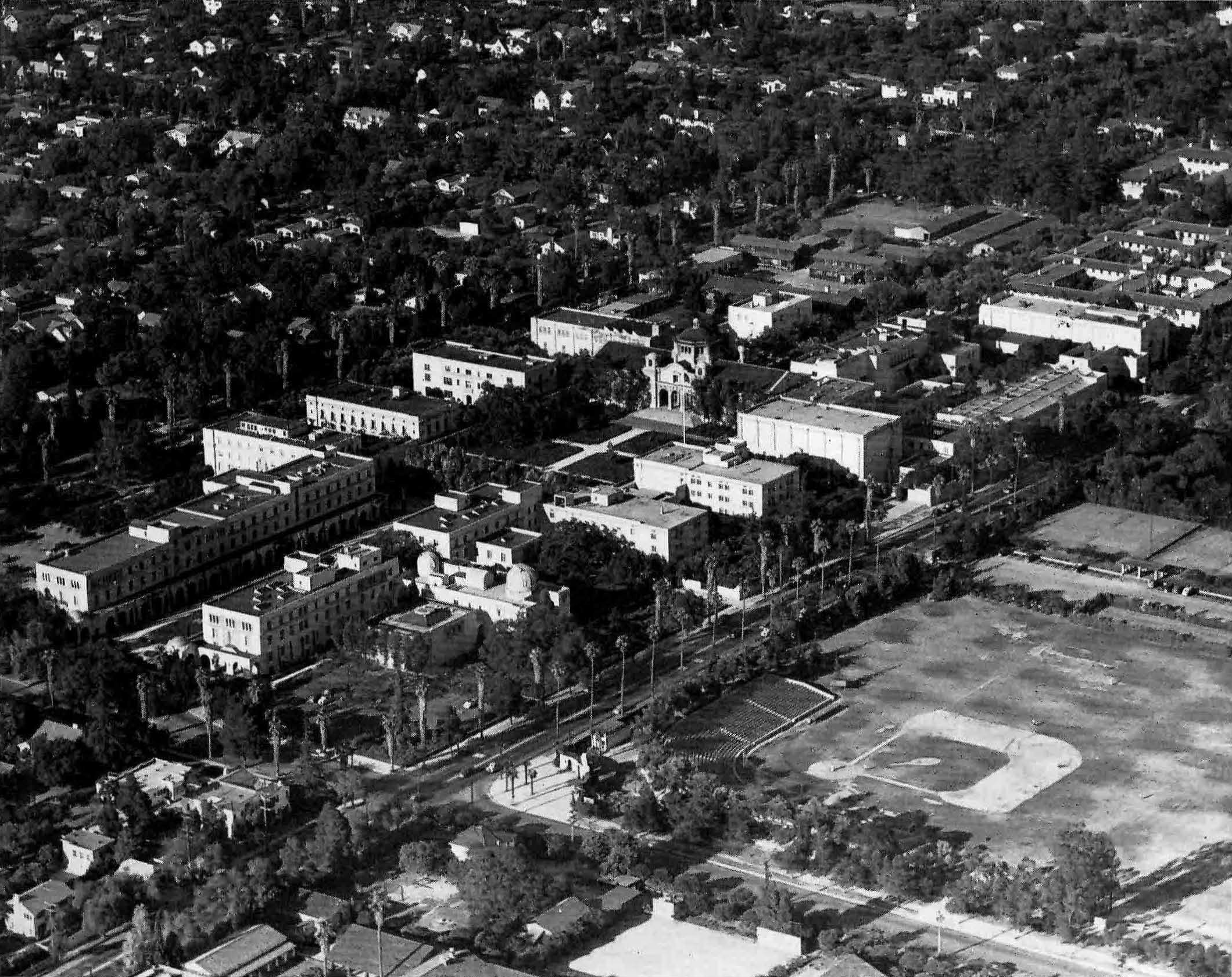
The campus in 1948

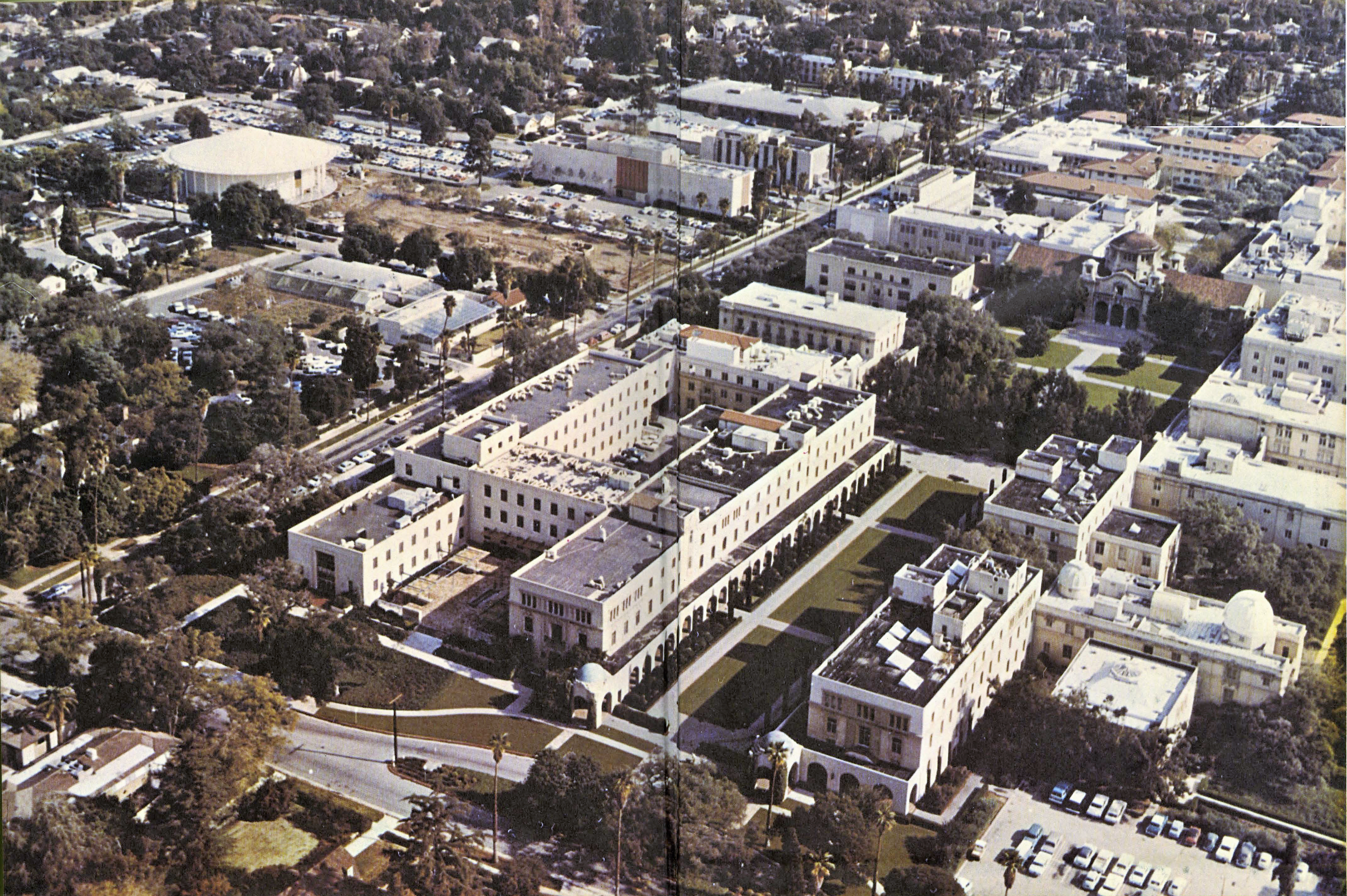
The campus in 1965

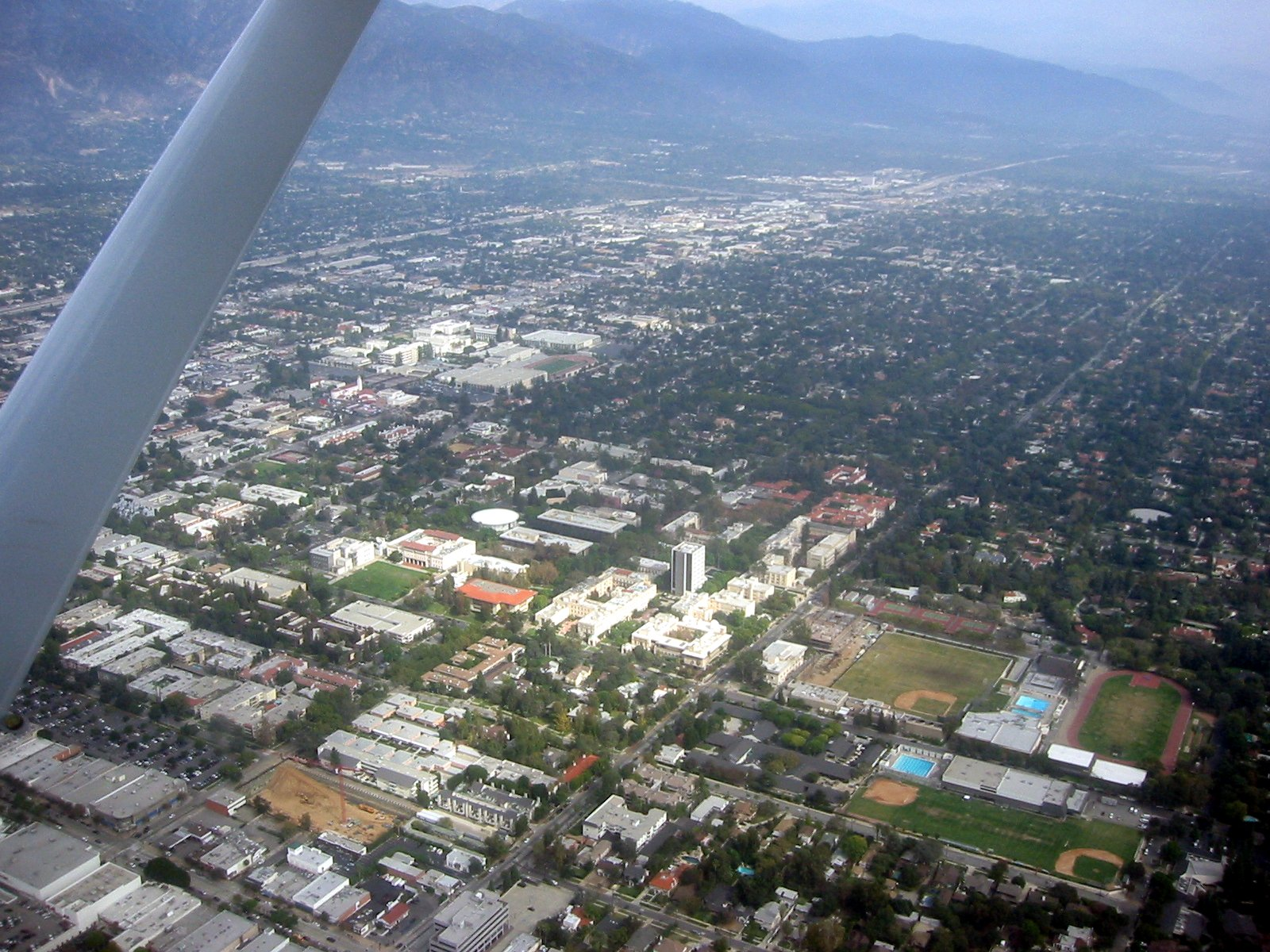
The campus in 2007

In 1917 Hale hired architect Bertram Goodhue to produce a master plan for the 22 acres (8.9 ha) campus. Goodhue conceived the overall layout of the campus and designed the physics building, Dabney Hall, and several other structures, in which he sought to be consistent with the local climate, the character of the school, and Hale's educational philosophy. Goodhue's designs for Caltech were also influenced by the traditional Spanish mission architecture of Southern California.

During the 1960s, Caltech underwent considerable expansion, in part due to the philanthropy of alumnus Arnold O. Beckman. In 1953, Beckman was asked to join the Caltech Board of Trustees. In 1964, he became its chairman. Over the next few years, as Caltech's president emeritus David Baltimore describes it, Arnold Beckman and his wife Mabel "shaped the destiny of Caltech".

The Beckmans made a major gift to Caltech in 1962, when they funded the construction of the Beckman Auditorium, a concert hall designed by architect Edward Durrell Stone. When the circular white stone hall opened with a gala concert on February 25, 1964, it was praised for its acoustics.

In 1971 a magnitude-6.6 earthquake in San Fernando caused some damage to the Caltech campus. Engineers who evaluated the damage found that two historic buildings dating from the early days of the Institute—Throop Hall and the Goodhue-designed Culbertson Auditorium—had cracked. These were some of the first reinforced concrete buildings, and their plans did not contain enough details (such as how much reinforcing bar had been embedded in the concrete) to be sure they were safe, so the engineers recommended demolition. However, demolishing these historic structures required considerably more effort than would have been necessary had they been in real danger of collapse. A large wrecking ball was used to demolish Throop Hall, and smashing the concrete revealed massive amounts of rebar, far in excess of safety requirements. The rebar had to be cut up before the pieces could be hauled away, and the process took much longer than expected.

The auditorium was the first of several expansions at Caltech that the Beckmans supported. In 1974, the Beckman Laboratory of Behavioral Biology (BBB) was dedicated. The building was seen as a significant step towards the establishment of a new program focusing on neurobiology and a multi-leveled understanding of brain and its mechanisms at the chemical, cellular, and systems levels. On April 25, 1986, the Beckman Laboratory of Chemical Synthesis was dedicated. The Beckmans' gift supported not only the building, but also the installation of state-of-the-art scientific instrumentation in six customized laboratories. Finally, the Beckmans funded the Beckman Institute, a multi-disciplinary center for research in the chemical and biological sciences. In 1986, Beckman agreed to donate $50 million towards the institute and its endowment. Designed by architect Albert C. Martin, Jr. in a Spanish style, the Beckman Institute was dedicated on October 26, 1989, and opened in 1990.

New additions to the campus include the Cahill Center for Astronomy and Astrophysics and the Walter and Leonore Annenberg Center for Information Science and Technology, which opened in 2009, and the Warren and Katherine Schlinger Laboratory for Chemistry and Chemical Engineering followed in March 2010. The Institute also concluded an upgrading of the South Houses in 2006. In late 2010, Caltech completed a 1.3 MW solar array projected to produce approximately 1.6 GWh in 2011.

== Notable buildings ==
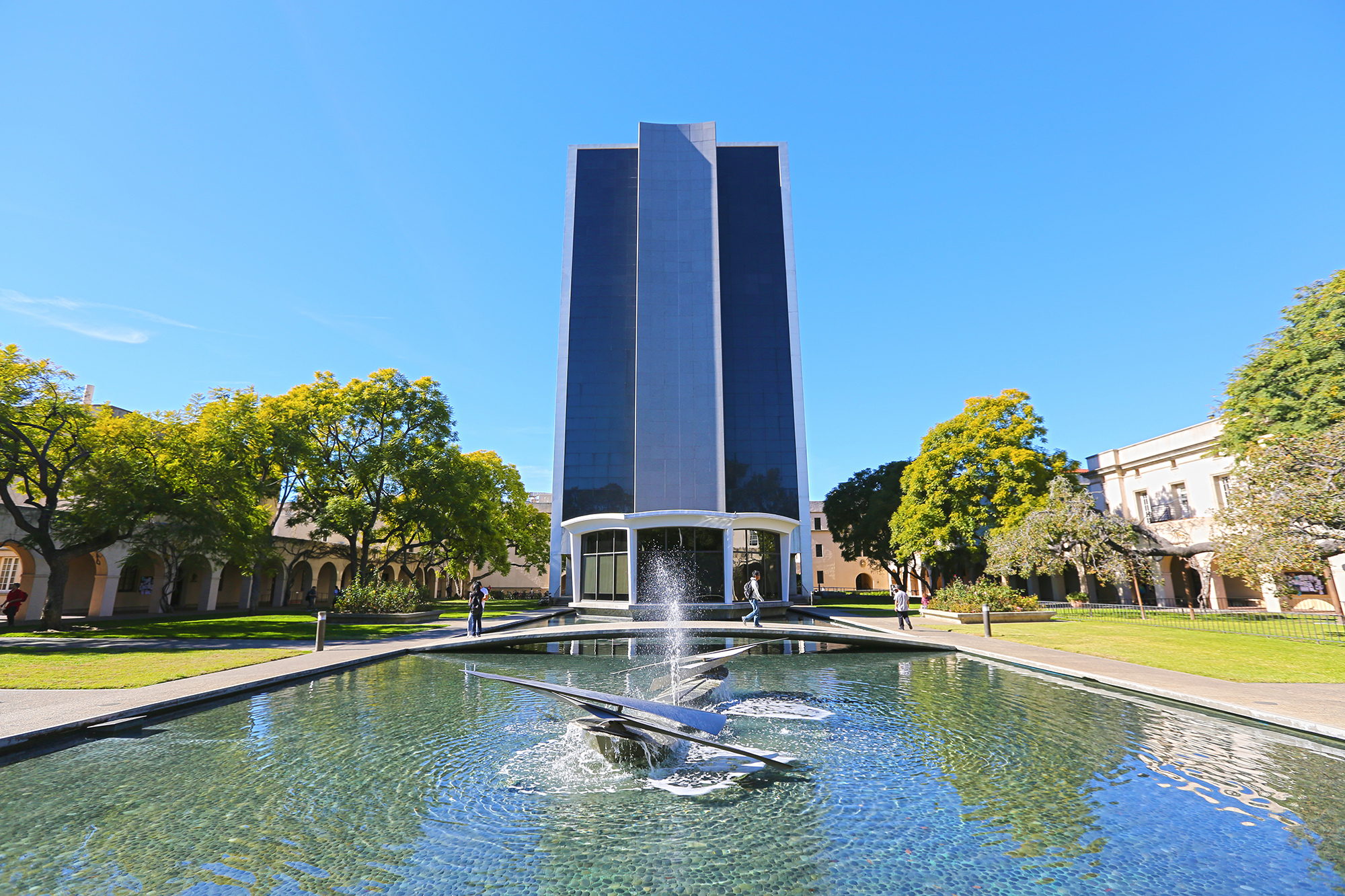
The former Millikan Library, renamed Caltech Hall in 2021, the tallest building on campus

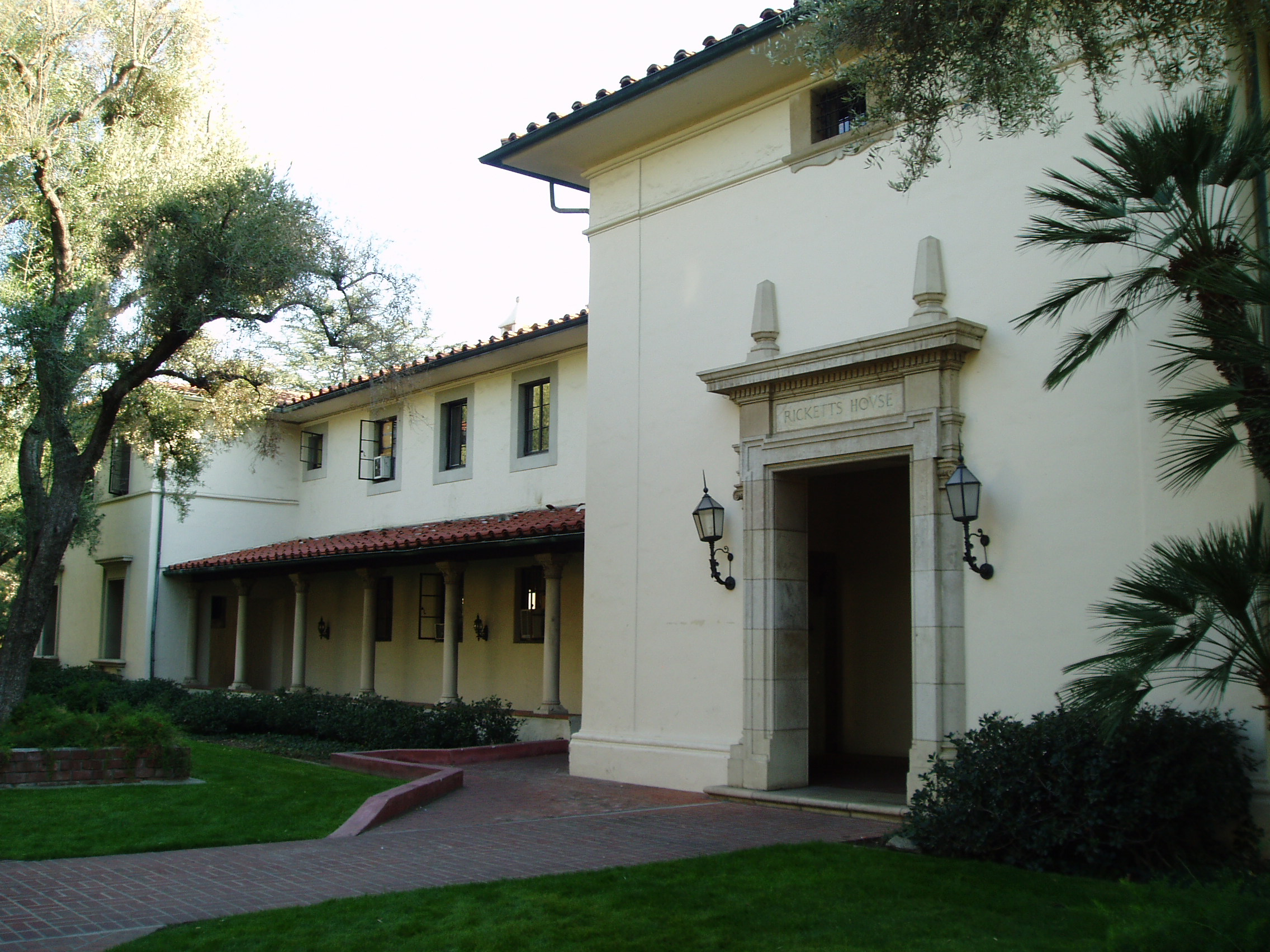
The exterior of Ricketts House, typical of the architecture of the 1931 Mediterranean-style South Houses

=== Athenaeum ===
The Athenaeum is a faculty club and private social club on the California Institute of Technology campus in Pasadena, California. It was designed by Gordon Kaufmann in the Mediterranean Revival style, with landscape design by Florence Yoch and Lucile Council, and opened in 1930. It includes a restaurant, a private hotel with several named suites (e.g. The Einstein Suite, where Albert Einstein lived while at Caltech), and serves as Caltech's Faculty Club.

=== Guggenheim Aeronautical Laboratory ===
The Guggenheim Aeronautical Laboratory at the California Institute of Technology (GALCIT), was a research institute created in 1926, at first specializing in aeronautics research. In 1930, Hungarian scientist Theodore von Kármán accepted the directorship of the lab and emigrated to the United States. Under his leadership, work on rockets began there in 1936. GALCIT was the first—and from 1936 to 1940 the only—university-based rocket research center. Based on GALCIT's JATO project at the time, the Jet Propulsion Laboratory was established under a contract with the United States Army in November 1943.

In 1961 the GALCIT acronym was retained while the name changed to Graduate Aeronautical Laboratories at the California Institute of Technology. In 2006, during the Directorship of Ares Rosakis, GALCIT was once again renamed, taking on the new name Graduate Aerospace Laboratories of the California Institute of Technology (while continuing to maintain the acronym GALCIT) in order to reflect its vigorous re-engagement with space engineering and with JPL.

=== Beckman Institute ===
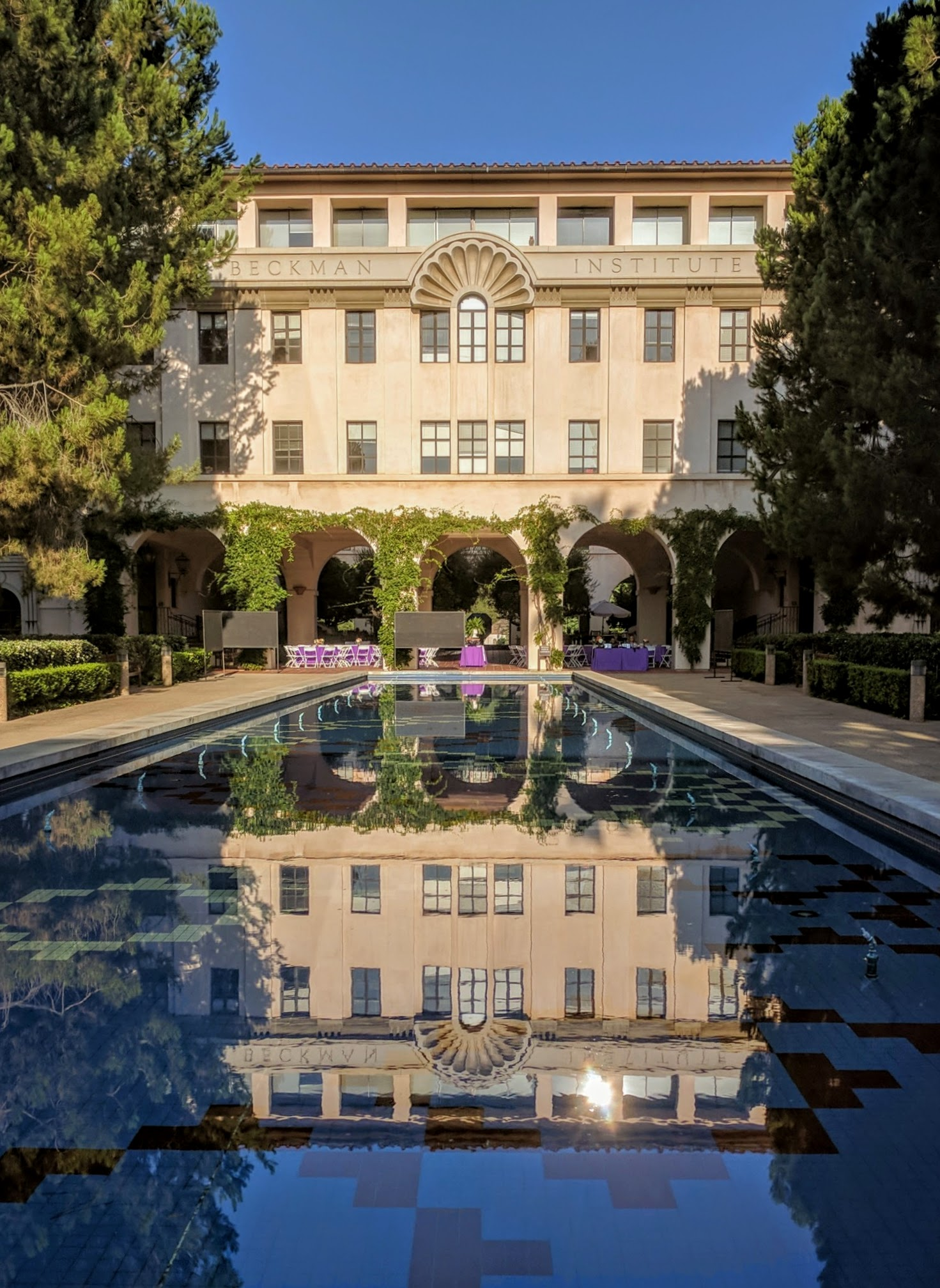
Beckman Institute building viewed across its reflecting pool

The Beckman Institute at Caltech is a multi-disciplinary center for research in the chemical and biological sciences. Founding of the Beckman Institute at Caltech was supported by a major philanthropic gift from the Arnold Orville Beckman and his wife Mabel, through the Arnold and Mabel Beckman Foundation. Beckman had a long-term relationship with Caltech as a student, teacher and trustee. After discussions with chemists Harry B. Gray and Peter Dervan, and biologists Eric H. Davidson and Leroy Hood, Beckman announced in 1986 that he would donate $50 million to establish the institute and an accompanying endowment. The Beckman Institute at Caltech was chartered by Caltech in 1987.

The institute building was designed by architect Albert C. Martin Jr. in a Spanish style with a pool and a central courtyard. It was dedicated on October 26, 1989, and opened in 1990. The building included four levels of laboratory space, libraries, and archives.

== List of buildings ==
This list includes buildings and facilities of California Institute of Technology. The listing does not include off-campus/co-owned properties. Demolished buildings are shown in grey.

Photo	Name	Opened	Notes	Add'l refs
	Throop Hall	1910	Originally Pasadena Hall, it was damaged in the 1971 San Fernando earthquake and demolished in 1973	
	Old Dormitory	1910	Constructed elsewhere in Pasadena, moved to Caltech campus in 1915. Demolished in 1962, replaced by Winnett Student Center	
	Parsons–Gates Hall of Administration	1917	Originally Gates Laboratory of Chemistry. The oldest existing building on campus. The 1917 portion of Gates was damaged in the 1971 San Fernando earthquake, and was rebuilt in 1983 as the Parsons-Gates Hall of Administration. Named for C. W. Gates, P. G. Gates, and Ralph M. Parsons.	
	Culbertson Hall	1921	Intended to be the east wing of a larger auditorium that was never built. Severely damaged in the 1971 San Fernando earthquake, it was demolished in 1972. South Mudd was built on its site.	
	Norman Bridge Laboratory of Physics	1922, 1924, 1925	Named for Norman Bridge	
	Steam Laboratory	1925	Demolished in 1996, replaced by Sherman Fairchild Laboratory	
	Alfred P. Sloan Laboratory of Mathematics and Physics	1925	Originally the High Voltage Research Laboratory, which was retired and rebuilt in 1960 into its configuration as Sloan. The interior was again stripped entirely and remains under renovation as of 2018. Named for Alfred P. Sloan.	
	Gates Annex	1927		
	Dabney Hall	1928	Named for Joseph B. Dabney	
	William G. Kerckhoff Laboratories of the Biological Sciences	1928, 1939, 1948	Named for William G. Kerckhoff	
	Guggenheim Aeronautical Laboratory	1929	Funded by Daniel Guggenheim Fund for the Promotion of Aeronautics	
	Athenaeum	1930	The faculty club. Albert Einstein stayed in the loggia during his annual winter visits to Caltech.	
	South Houses	1931	Undergraduate houses, including Blacker House, Dabney House, Fleming House, and Ricketts House. Partially renovated in 2006. The houses are named after Robert R. Blacker, Joseph B. Dabney, Arthur H. Fleming, and L. D. Ricketts. All affiliated with the undergraduate house system.	
	W. K. Kellogg Radiation Laboratory	1932	Named for Will Keith Kellogg	
	Ronald and Maxine Linde Laboratory for Global Environmental Science	1932	Originally Henry M. Robinson Laboratory of Astrophysics; transformed into its current configuration in 2011 and renamed Linde + Robinson Laboratory for Global Environmental Science; received current name in 2021	
	Synchrotron Building	1933	Originally the Optical Shop	
	Machine Shop	1933	Demolished in 1969, replaced by Downs and Lauritsen Laboratories	
	Crellin Laboratory of Chemistry	1937	Named for Mr. and Mrs. E. W. Crellin	
	Charles Arms Laboratory of the Geological Sciences	1938	Named for Charles Arms, father of Mrs. Henry Robinson	
	Seeley W. Mudd Laboratory of the Geological Sciences	1938	Named for Seeley W. Mudd, also known as North Mudd	
	Gates–Thomas Laboratory of Engineering	1945, 1950	Named for Franklin Thomas and Charles Gates Jr.	
	Earhart Plant Research Laboratory	1949	Site of the phytotron, the Earhart Laboratory featured the first completely controllable enclosed plant growth chambers, used to establish the ecological niche of the tomato plant. The building was demolished in 1973	
	Alumni Swimming Pool	1954		
	Scott Brown Gymnasium	1954		
	Norman W. Church Laboratory for Chemical Biology	1955		
	Eudora Hull Spalding Laboratory of Engineering	1957		
	Archibald Young Health Center	1957		
	Physical Plant Building and Shops	1959		
	Gordon A. Alles Laboratory for Molecular Biology	1960	Named for Gordon Alles, the inventor of amphetamine drugs	
	North Houses	1960	Undergraduate houses, including. Lloyd House, Page House, and Venerable House (formerly Ruddock House). All affiliated with the house system.	
	Lee F. Browne Dining Hall	1960	Formerly the Harry Chandler Dining Hall; name changed by the board of trustees in 2021 due to Chandler's involvement with the eugenics movement.	
	W. M. Keck Engineering Laboratories	1960	Funded by W. M. Keck Foundation	
	Campbell Plant Research Laboratory	1960	The facility included a research greenhouse. Built with funds provided by the Campbell Soup Company. The greenhouse was later used for art classes. The building was demolished in 1996.	
	Graduate houses	1961	Originally included Braun House, Keck House, Marks House, and Mosher–Jorgensen House. Keck and Mosher–Jorgensen were converted into the Center for Student Services in 2000 and 2002 respectively. Braun and Marks were temporarily used to house undergraduates from the South Houses from 2004 to 2006 during renovations, and were repurposed as house-unaffiliated undergraduate housing in 2006.	
	Kármán Laboratory of Fluid Mechanics and Jet Propulsion	1961	Named for Theodore von Kármán	
	Firestone Flight Sciences Laboratory	1962	Named for Firestone Tire and Rubber Company	
	Winnett Student Center	1962	Demolished in 2017, replaced by Hameetman Center	
	Powell-Booth Laboratory for Computational Science	1963	Originally the Willis H. Booth Computing Center, renovated in 1999. Named for Willis H. Booth and Charles Lee Powell	
	Beckman Auditorium	1964	Named for Arnold Orville Beckman	
	Harry G. Steele Laboratory of Electrical Sciences	1965		
	Central Engineering Services Building	1966		
	Caltech Hall	1967	Formerly named Robert A. Millikan Memorial Library; name changed by the board of trustees in 2021 due to Millikan's involvement with the Human Betterment Foundation and the eugenics movement.	
	Arthur Amos Noyes Laboratory of Chemical Physics	1967	Named for Arthur Amos Noyes	
	Central Plant	1967		
	George W. Downs Laboratory of Physics and Charles C. Lauritsen Laboratory of High Energy Physics	1969	Named for George W. Downs and Charles Christian Lauritsen	
	Keith Spalding Building of Business Services	1969		
	Donald E. Baxter, M.D., Hall of the Humanities and Social Sciences	1971	Includes Ramo Auditorium, named for Simon Ramo	
	The Earle M. Jorgensen Laboratory of Information Science	1971, 2012	Complete renovation in 2012; now Jorgensen Laboratory for sustainability research	
	The Mabel and Arnold Beckman Laboratories of Behavioral Biology	1974	Named for Arnold Orville Beckman	
	Seeley G. Mudd Building of Geophysics and Planetary Science	1974	Also known as South Mudd, named for Seeley G. Mudd	
	Clifford S. and Ruth A. Mead Memorial Undergraduate Chemistry Laboratory	1981	Demolished in November 2021 and replaced by the Resnick Sustainability Center. Mead replaced an old two-story house that served as a gathering place for Biology Division students, and later the Caltech Coffee House.	
	Thomas J. Watson, Sr., Laboratories of Applied Physics	1982	Named for Thomas J. Watson	
	Braun Laboratories in Memory of Carl F. and Winifred H. Braun	1982		
	Athletic Facility	1984		
	Catalina Graduate Apartment Complex	1984, 1986, 1988		
	David W. Morrisroe Astroscience Laboratory	1986	Originally the Infrared Processing and Analysis Center, renamed in 1995	
	Wilson Avenue North Parking Structure	1987		
	Beckman Institute	1989	Named for Arnold Orville Beckman	
	Braun Athletic Center	1992		
	Holliston Avenue Parking Structure/Satellite Utility Plant	1993		
	The Gordon and Betty Moore Laboratory of Engineering	1996	Named for Gordon Moore and Betty Moore	
	Avery House	1996	Named for R. Stanton Avery. Originally housed a mixture of graduate and upperclassmen undergraduate students with faculty-in-residence. Began housing freshmen in 2006. Now affiliated with the house system and houses undergraduates with faculty-in-residence.	
	Sherman Fairchild Library of Engineering and Applied Science	1997	Funded by Sherman Fairchild Foundation	
	Wilson Avenue South Parking Structure	1999		
	Financial Services Building	2000		
	Broad Center for the Biological Sciences	2002	Named for Eli Broad and Edythe Broad	
	California Parking Structure	2005	Located underneath the athletic fields	
	Cahill Center for Astronomy and Astrophysics	2009		
	Walter and Leonore Annenberg Center for Information Science and Technology	2009	Funded by the Annenberg Foundation	
	Warren and Katharine Schlinger Laboratory for Chemistry and Chemical Engineering	2010		
	The Keck Center	2013	Incorporates the historic Tolman-Bacher House. Funded by the W. M. Keck Foundation.	
	Caltech Childcare Center	2014		
	Bechtel Residence	2018	Named for Stephen Bechtel Jr. Unaffiliated undergraduate housing with faculty-in-residence.	
	Hameetman Center	2019	Replaced Winnett Student Center	
	Tianqiao and Chrissy Chen Neuroscience Research Building	2021	Named for Tianqiao Chen and Chrissy Chen	
	AWS Center	2021		
	Resnick Sustainability Center	2024	Named for Steve and Lynda Resnick. Replaced Mead Laboratory.	
