= Roland Coate =

American architect (1890–1958)

- Born: December 5, 1890; Richmond, Indiana, U.S.
- Died: October 17, 1958 (aged 67); San Diego County, California, U.S.
- Education: Earlham College; Cornell University
- Occupation: Architect
- Spouse: Gladys
- Children: William Bleecker Coate, Roland E Coate, Jr., Suzanne Coate

Roland Coate (December 5, 1890 – October 17, 1958) was an American architect. He designed many houses and buildings in California, three of which are listed on the National Register of Historic Places.

== Early life ==
Coate was born on December 5, 1890, in Richmond, Indiana. He attended Earlham College in Richmond, Indiana, from 1910 to 1912, and he graduated from Cornell University in Ithaca, New York, in 1914.

== Career ==
Coate worked as a draftsman at the Manhattan firm founded by two fellow Cornell School of Architecture alumni, Trowbridge and Ackerman. Around this time he also designed a home for his parents at 1624 Reeveston Road, Richmond, Indiana.

During World War I, Coate served in the United States Army's 32nd Aero Squadron achieving the rank of first lieutenant. After the war he returned to Trowbridge and Ackerman.

After marrying in 1920, Coate and his wife Margaret moved to California where Coate had accepted a position with the residential architect Reginald Davis Johnson, in Pasadena, California. After one year, Coate became a full partner with Johnson and Gordon Kaufmann in the new firm of Johnson, Kaufmann, and Coate. Johnson generously structured the firm in a way that allowed the two younger architects to handle independent commissions on the side. In 1924, the three architects chose to close the firm due to a lack of commercial and institutional commissions. The three continued to share the same office space and even some of the same staff after opening their respective private practices.

In 1924, Coate designed the Campbell House located at 1244 Wentworth Avenue in Pasadena, California. He also designed the Robert E. Pond House located at 655 Bradford Street in Pasadena. In 1925, he designed the Stafford W. Sixby House located at 1148 Garfield Avenue in South Pasadena, California, which went on to win a Certificate of Honor from the Southern California Chapter of the American Institute of Architects in 1927. The following year, he designed the Eva K.J. Fudger House located at 211 Muirfield Road in Hancock Park, Los Angeles; it was later purchased by Howard Hughes (1905–1976). He also designed Fudger's residence at 1103 San Ysidro Drive in Beverly Hills, California. In 1927, he designed Casa Oceana near Bluff Park in Long Beach, California.

In 1930, Coate designed the Elliott Bandini House located at 90274 Via Almar and Via Arroyo in Palos Verdes Estates, California. The same year, he designed the Monterey Colonial style mansion of D.C. Norcross located at 673 Siena Way in Bel Air, Los Angeles; A.E. Hanson (1893–1986) was the landscape architect. In 1931, he designed the Monterey Colonial style Pasadena Town Club located at 378 South Madison Avenue in Pasadena, California. In 1933 and 1934, he designed the private residence of film producer David O. Selznick (1902–1965) in Beverly Hills. In 1934, he designed the W.B Hart House in Pasadena, California, and the Parley Johnson House in Downey, California. The same year, he also designed the private residence of Henry W. O'Melveny located at 1709 Stone Canyon Road in Bel Air. In 1939, he designed the Everett Sebring House located at 612 Berkshire Avenue in La Cañada Flintridge, California. He renovated and enlarged the Jack Warner Estate. In 1941, he designed the private residence of Robert Taylor (1911–1969) and Barbara Stanwyck (1907–1990) located at 1101 Beverly Drive in Beverly Hills, California.

Together with Silas Reese Burns (1855–1940), Sumner Hunt (1865–1938) and Aurele Vermeulen (1885–1983), Coate designed the headquarters of the Automobile Club of Southern California located at 2601 South Figueroa Street from 1921 to 1923.

Together with Reginald Davis Johnson (1882–1952) and Gordon Kaufmann (1888–1949), Coate designed the All Saints Episcopal Church in Pasadena, California, in 1923, listed on the National Register of Historic Places. In 1924, they designed Camp Arthur Letts, named after Arthur Letts, of the Boy Scouts of America in the Hollywood Hills. The same year, they designed the Hale Solar Laboratory and the Griffith House (at 1275 Hillcrest Avenue) in Pasadena. In 1924–1925, they designed a new building for Saint Paul's Episcopal Cathedral located at 615 South Figueroa Street; it was demolished in the 1970s. He also designed the private residence of H.C. Lippiatt & M.P. Taylor in Bel Air, Los Angeles.

In 1940, he worked on Avalon Gardens, a low-cost housing project for the City of Los Angeles Housing Authority. After the Attack on Pearl Harbor Coate closed his architectural practice and he and his family moved to Alabama so Coate could work at the Bechtel-McCone-Parsons Corporation aircraft plant. After the war, Coate and his family returned to Los Angeles and he reopened his private practice.

His achievements include works that are listed on the U.S. National Register of Historic Places. These include (with attribution spellings that vary):

- Casa de Parley Johnson, 7749 Florence Ave., Downey, California (Coate, Roland A.) Built 1927 in Mission/Spanish Revival style, NRHP-listed
- Hale Solar Laboratory, 740 Holladay Rd., Pasadena, California (Johnson, Kaufman & Coate), built 1924 in Mission/Spanish Revival, Spanish Colonial style, NRHP-listed
- Lake Arrowhead, 778 Shelter Cove Dr., Lake Arrowhead, California, also known as John O'Melveny Residence (Coate, Roland E.), NRHP-listed

Coate became a Fellow of the American Institute of Architects in 1937. His work was also part of the architecture event in the art competition at the 1936 Summer Olympics.

Coate retired in 1956.

== Personal life and death ==
Coate met stenographer Margaret Bleecker at Trowbridge and Ackerman. They were married on October 1, 1920. They spent their honeymoon on a cruise to New Orleans. Coate designed a "honeymoon" cottage in the Arroyo Park neighborhood of Pasadena at 389 California Terrace. The Coates lived there for a decade. After divorcing Margaret, Coate married Gladys Robinson in 1928.

Coate had a beach house he built in 1935 located in Emerald Bay, Laguna Beach, Orange County, California. He had two sons, William Bleecker Coate and Roland E Coate Jr., also an architect, and one daughter, Suzanne Coate. He died on October 17, 1958, in San Diego County, California.
