= Jack Warner Estate =

Estate in Beverly Hills, California, United States

- Interactive map of the Jack Warner Estate area

General information
- Architectural style: Georgian
- Location: 1801 Angelo Drive, Beverly Hills, California, U.S.
- Coordinates: 34°5′10″N 118°25′34″W
- Client: Jack L. Warner

Design and construction
- Architect: Roland Coate

The Jack Warner Estate is a property in Beverly Hills, California 9.4-acre (3.8 ha) that was developed by Jack L. Warner of Warner Bros. who had first bought 3 acres of farmland here in 1926, expanding it over the years to 1937. A preserved 'Golden Age of Hollywood' estate, it centers around a large Neo-Georgian mansion. In February 2020, it was reported that the estate had been sold by David Geffen to Jeff Bezos for $165 million, a record deal for residential property in Los Angeles.

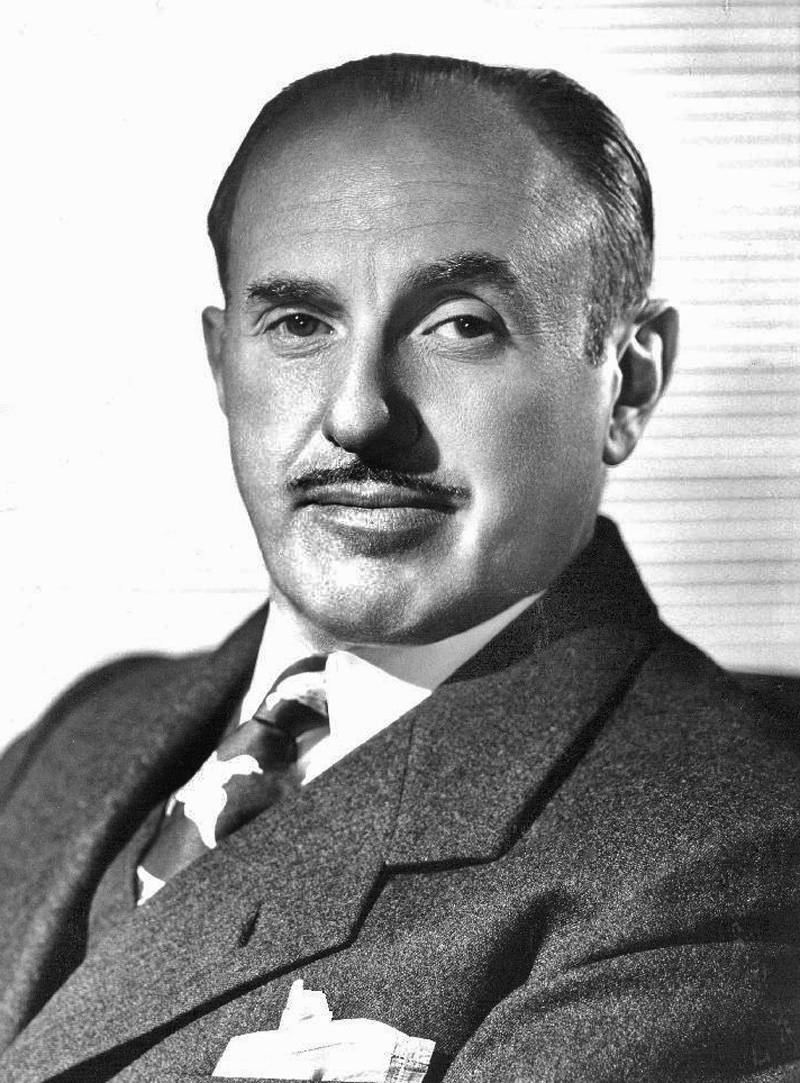
Jack Warner, the original owner of the estate.

== Design ==
The estate, with its 13,000 square feet (1,200 m^{2}) mansion in the Georgian style with a Greek portico, was featured in a 1992 article in Architectural Digest and described as "the archetypal studio mogul's estate". Warner had hired Roland Coate as his architect to enlarge and remodel the existing Spanish-style mansion and William Haines for the interior decorating. Florence Yoch designed the grounds. In addition, the estate has a pool, a tennis court, and a nine-hole golf course.

The house is featured in the 2008 book The Legendary Estates of Beverly Hills by Jeffrey Hyland, who wrote: "No studio czar's residence, before or since, has ever surpassed in size, grandeur, or sheer glamour the Jack Warner Estate on Angelo Drive in Benedict Canyon."

The grounds of the estate also include several guest houses, including one used by Marilyn Monroe.

== Ownership ==
After Warner's death in 1978, his widow, Ann Warner, continued to live at the estate until her death in 1990. David Geffen bought the estate including its furnishings – "the last intact estate from Hollywood's Golden Age in Beverly Hills" – in 1990 for $47.5 million; a record price for a single-family home at that time. Jeff Bezos's record-breaking purchase of the Jack Warner Estate from David Geffen was reported in February 2020.
