= N.O.C. The Jam Studio =

Music rehearsal space in Mumbai, India

N.O.C. The Jam (Room) Studio is a Music rehearsal space in Mumbai, India. The space's target audience is rock/metal/punk bands in Mumbai. N.O.C. stands for "No Objection Certificate (Issued)" as the studio was started in an industrial estate after taking out all the necessary licenses and no-objection certificates required for creating ultra-loud levels of noise in an otherwise peaceful environment. This is one of the reasons it has survived, and has become a hangout for emerging and established Mumbai rock bands.

After N.O.C., similar jam rooms have begun to spring up in other cities in India.
