= Musicians Union of Hollywood Building =

Historic commercial building in Hollywood, California. U.S.

Musicians Union of Hollywood
- Interactive map of the Musicians Union of Hollywood area

General information
- Type: Commercial
- Architectural style: Corporate International
- Location: 807-831 North Vine Street, 808-820 Lillian Way, and 5901 West Waring Avenue, Hollywood, California, U.S.
- Coordinates: 34°05′09″N 118°19′36″W
- Named for: Musicians Union of Los Angeles
- Completed: 1950

Technical details
- Floor area: 33,000 square feet (3,100 m^{2})

Design and construction
- Architect: Gordon B. Kaufmann

Los Angeles Historic-Cultural Monument
- Designated: March 23, 2018
- Reference no.: 1158

Musicians Union of Hollywood, also known as Musicians Union Hall, is a historic commercial building located at 807-831 North Vine Street, 808-820 Lillian Way, and 5901 West Waring Avenue in Hollywood, California. It was home to the Musicians Union of Los Angeles from its opening in 1950 until 2017, and was declared Los Angeles Historic-Cultural Monument No. 1158 in 2018.

== History ==
Musicians Union of Hollywood was designed by Gordon B. Kaufmann and completed in January 1950, the year after his death. The Musicians Union of Los Angeles celebrated their move into the building on January 21, 1950, with celebrities including Bob Hope, Jimmy Durante, Bing Crosby, and Les Brown in attendance.

The Musicians Union of Los Angeles vacated the building on July 14, 2017. Notable musicians associated with the building while it housed the Musicians Union include Bill Douglass, Bobby Short, Ernie Freeman, and The Wrecking Crew.

The building was declared Los Angeles Historic-Cultural Monument No. 1158 on March 23, 2018. It was owned by Lincoln Property at the time.

== Architecture and design ==
Musicians Union of Hollywood is square in plan, two stories in height, and features a Corporate International design. The building is a concrete construction clad in smooth plaster topped by a flat roof with composition shingles. The first floor is articulated and set behind columns on its east and south elevations.

The building's primary entrance is located on north elevation and features two single-paned glass doors framed by pierced concrete block portals below a covered canopy supported by thin columns. A secondary entrance, located on the east elevation, is recessed, asymmetrical, and features single-paned glass double doors with decorative music notes made of steel. A horizontal band of steel awning windows wrap the east and south facades of the second story; the east facade also features a slightly protruding bay of five triple-hung steel windows. Other defining aspects of the building include integral ground floor landscaping and a lack of ornamentation.

At the building's opening, it contained office space, a lounge connected to an interior patio, a large recreational room, numerous soundproof rehearsal halls, and a large auditorium. The interior features wood paneling, patterned flooring, and a terrazzo-floored stairwell, and the floor area is 33,000 square feet (3,100 m^{2}) split across two floors and a basement.
