= Casa de Parley Johnson =

Historic house in California, United States

- U.S. National Register of Historic Places
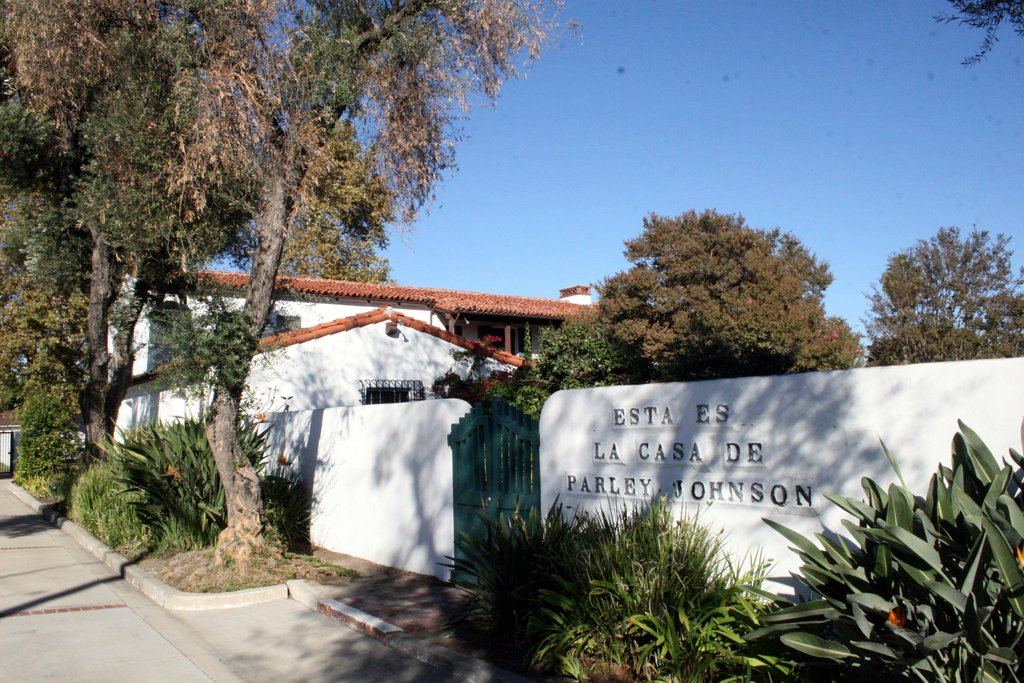
- Casa de Parley Johnson in 2012

- Location within California Location within the United States
- Location: 7749 Florence Avenue, Downey, California
- Coordinates: 33°57′24″N 118°7′57″W
- Area: 1.5 acres (0.61 ha)
- Built: 1927
- Architect: Coate, Roland A. Coate
- Architectural style: Mission/Spanish Revival
- NRHP reference No.: 86000449
- Added to NRHP: March 20, 1986

The Casa de Parley Johnson is a historic house in Downey, California, U.S. It was built for Alexander Parley Johnson, an heir to citrus fields, real estate and oil investments, in 1927. It was designed in the Spanish Revival architectural style by Roland Coate. It has been listed on the National Register of Historic Places since March 20, 1986.

The Johnsons owned the house until 1986, when it was given to the Assistance League of Downey.
