= Santa Barbara Main Post Office =

- US Post Office—Santa Barbara Main
- U.S. National Register of Historic Places
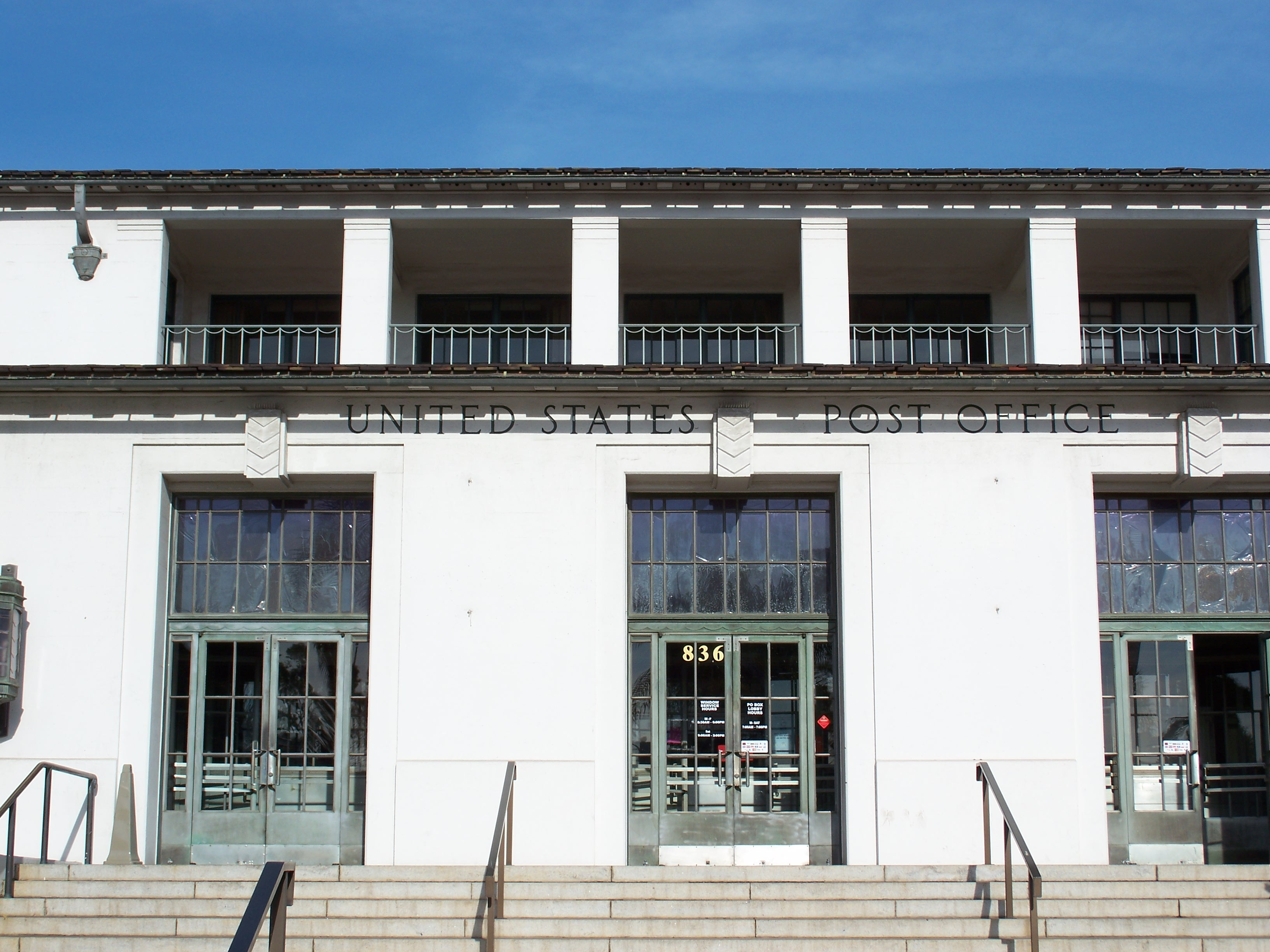

- Location within California
- Location: 836 Anacapa St., Santa Barbara, California
- Coordinates: 34°25′22″N 119°41′57″W
- Area: 1.3 acres (0.53 ha)
- Built: 1937
- Architect: Reginald Davis Johnson
- Architectural style: Art Deco, Mission/spanish Revival
- MPS: US Post Office in California 1900-1941 TR
- NRHP reference No.: 85000138
- Added to NRHP: January 11, 1985

The Santa Barbara Main Post Office is a combined post office-federal office building in Santa Barbara, California. The post office is a prominent example of Mission Revival-influenced Art Deco design and is a significant building in the historic core of Santa Barbara. It was designed by Pasadena architect Reginald Davis Johnson in the mid-1930s, and was completed in 1937. The building retains a high degree of architectural integrity, with minimal changes to the interior and no changes to the exterior, which retains its original landscaping.

== Description ==
The Santa Barbara Post Office has a generally Spanish Colonial character that harmonizes with traditional local architecture, using a terra cotta roof and white stuccoed walls. The building was constructed in reinforced concrete. Although the building is composed with Mission Revival elements and massing, the details are Art Deco, with chevron details typically used by Johnson and complementary sculpture. The bronze doors and building hardware are more characteristic of Art Deco than of Mission. Streamline Moderne interior reliefs are by William Atkinson, using motifs typical of the 1930s.

The Santa Barbara Post Office was placed on the National Register of Historic Places as US Post Office—Santa Barbara Main on January 11, 1985.

== See also ==
- National Register of Historic Places listings in Santa Barbara County, California
- List of United States post offices
- List of New Deal sculpture
