= Hale Solar Laboratory =

- U.S. National Register of Historic Places
- U.S. National Historic Landmark
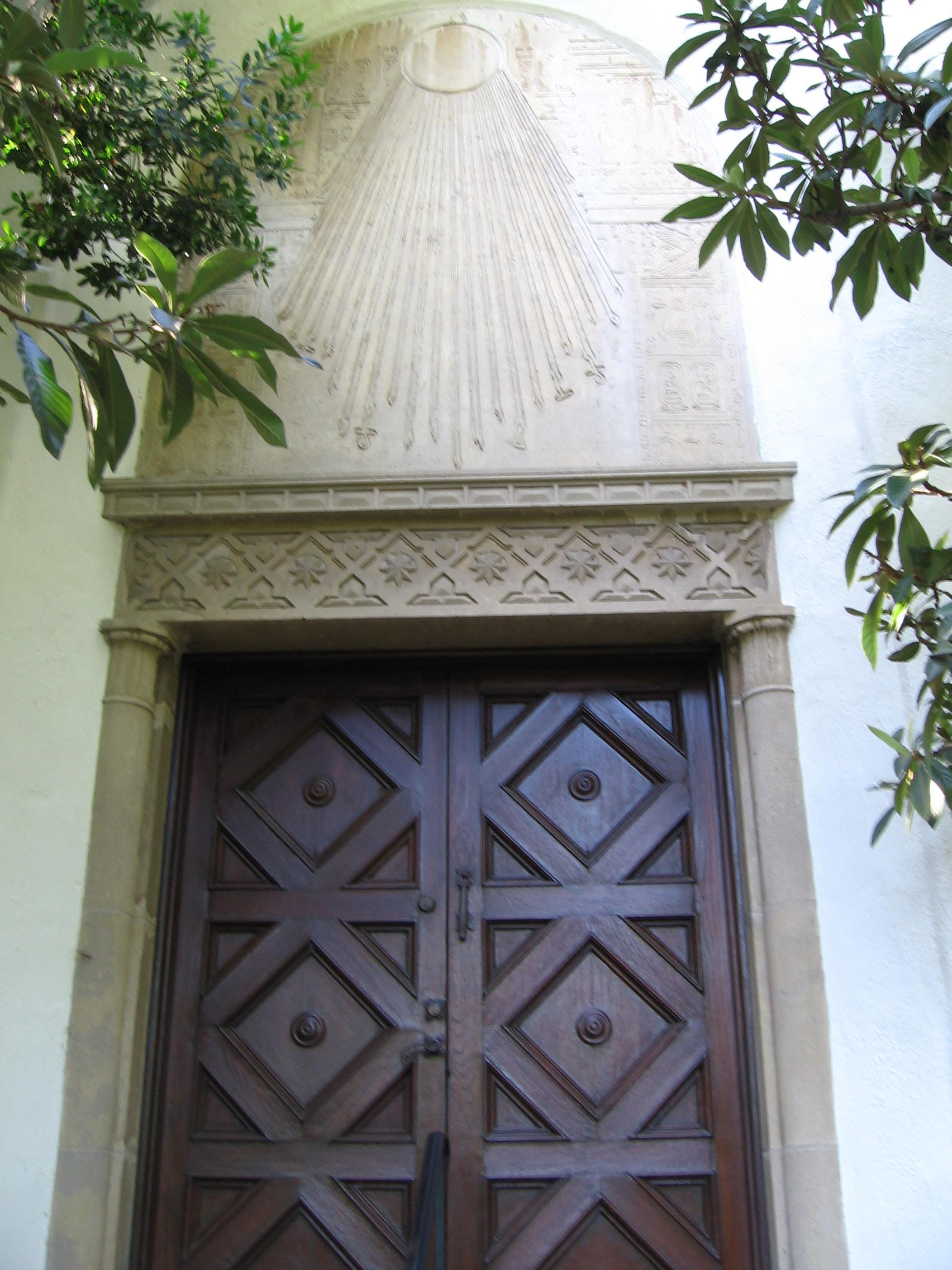
- The Hale Solar Laboratory entrance, with a bas relief by Lee Lawrie of the sun and its rays over the door, Pasadena, California

- Location within the Los Angeles metropolitan area Location within California Location within the United States
- Location: 740 Holladay Drive, Pasadena, California
- Coordinates: 34°7′58.63″N 118°7′14.23″W
- Area: less than one acre
- Built: 1923
- Architect: Johnson, Kaufman & Coate
- Architectural style: Mission Revival—Spanish Colonial Revival
- NRHP reference No.: 86000103

Significant dates
- Added to NRHP: January 23, 1986
- Designated NHL: December 20, 1989

The Hale Solar Laboratory is a historic astronomical observatory in Pasadena, Los Angeles County, California, United States. Built in 1923, it was the laboratory of astronomer George Ellery Hale (1868-1938), a pioneering figure in the development of the discipline of astrophysics in the United States. The building, a distinctive blend of Mission Revival and Spanish Colonial Revival styles, was designated a National Historic Landmark in 1989.

== Description ==
The Hale Solar Laboratory is located in a residential area on private property south of the campus of the California Institute of Technology, on the east side of Holladay Road between Lombardy and Orlando Roads. It is set well back from the street, down a narrow tree-lined lane. It is a roughly T-shaped concrete structure, with a tile roof. The stem of the T consists of the telescope tower and Hale's library/office and living area, while the top portion of the T historically housed electrical and ventilation equipment. The main entrance is at the base of the tower, set in an arch above which is an incised bas-relief tribute to Akhenaten, the Egyptian pharaoh who worshipped the sun god Aten.

== History ==
The observatory was designed by Reginald Davis Johnson (1882 - 1952), Gordon Kaufmann (1888–1949), and Roland Coate (1890-1958) and was completed in 1923. The site's landscape master plan and gardens were designed by Beatrix Farrand.

After retiring as director at the Mount Wilson Observatory, George Ellery Hale built the Hale Solar Laboratory as his office and workshop, pursuing his interest in the sun. The observatory was where Hale refined the spectrohelioscope, making it possible to perform detailed observations of the surface of the Sun. Hale's other wide-ranging contributions to the sciences include the founding of the International Astronomical Union, the Astrophysical Journal, and instrumental contributions to the founding of the California Institute of Technology.

== Landmark ==
The Hale Solar Laboratory was declared a National Historic Landmark in 1989.

== See also ==
- History of Pasadena, California
- List of National Historic Landmarks in California
- National Register of Historic Places listings in Pasadena, California
