= La Valencia Hotel =

Historic hotel in La Jolla, California, U.S.

La Valencia Hotel (1928)
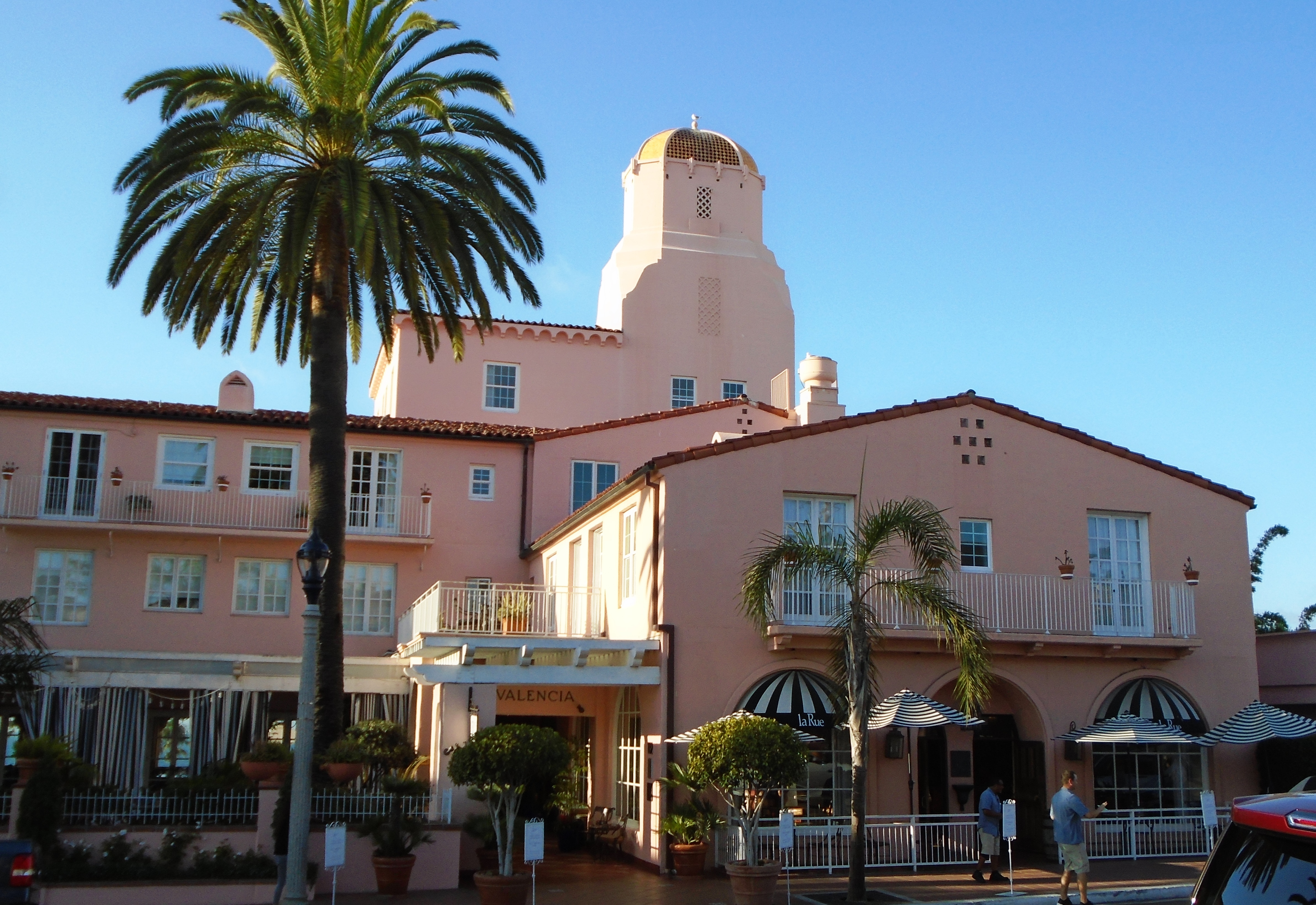
- Interactive map of the La Valencia Hotel (1928) area
- Former names: Los Apartmentos de Sevilla (1926)
- Alternative names: "the Pink Lady"
- Hotel chain: Preferred Hotels & Resorts

General information
- Architectural style: Spanish school
- Location: 1132 Prospect Street, San Diego, California, United States
- Coordinates: 32.8483°N 117.2735°W
- Completed: 1926

Design and construction
- Architect: Reginald D. Johnson
- Known for: historic design, Depression era-association with Hollywood, tower-watch for enemy planes during World War II

Website
- lavalencia.com

La Valencia Hotel is a hotel in the La Jolla community of San Diego, California, known also as "The Pink Lady of La Jolla". It was built in the 1920s in a Spanish Colonial Revival–style that is known for views of La Jolla Cove, and its historic associations with early 20th century Hollywood glamor.

Founded as Los Apartmentos de Sevilla, it changed to its current name in 1928, two years after it opened. It was an original (1989) member of the Historic Hotels of America, and has been expanded from the original, and remodeled and modernized throughout its history; as of January 2022, it continued in operation as a full service lodging and hospitality venue with historic status.

== History ==
The La Valencia, which overlooks La Jolla Cove and so offers ocean views in its premium units, began as an apartment hotel, opening as Los Apartmentos de Sevilla in 1926 with renaming as La Vilencia two years later. Its original design—by architect Reginald D. Johnson—combined stylistic elements from the Spanish school of architecture and included "iconic pink hues", its rose-colored exteriors leading to its becoming known as "The Pink Lady of La Jolla".

Throughout its early years—it opened just a few years before the Great Depression, and survived it—the hotel was known for its drawing "locals and Hollywood stars alike" (including Gregory Peck), and its Whaling Bar, which operated from 1945 to 2013, drew writers, including Raymond Chandler, Theodor Geisel, Norman Mailer, and Gore Vidal. Losing its space to the onsite restaurant, La Rue, in 2013, reports had appeared as of May 2021 indicating the return of The Whaling Bar to its original space in La Valencia.

== Renovation ==
La Valencia was renovated in 2014. In 2020 it has 114 rooms and suites.

== Recognition ==
La Valancia is known for its history and location, and receives further positive reviews for its staff, and for its trio of onsite restaurants (The Med, La Sala, and Café La Rue). It is considered a 4-star hotel and was ranked in the top five of hotels in La Jolla by U.S. News & World Report, and as of January 2022 it was rated 4.5 stars by TripAdvisor.com.
