= Athenaeum at Caltech =

Private social club at the California Institute of Technology

Coordinates: 34.136838°N 118.121679°W

Athenaeum
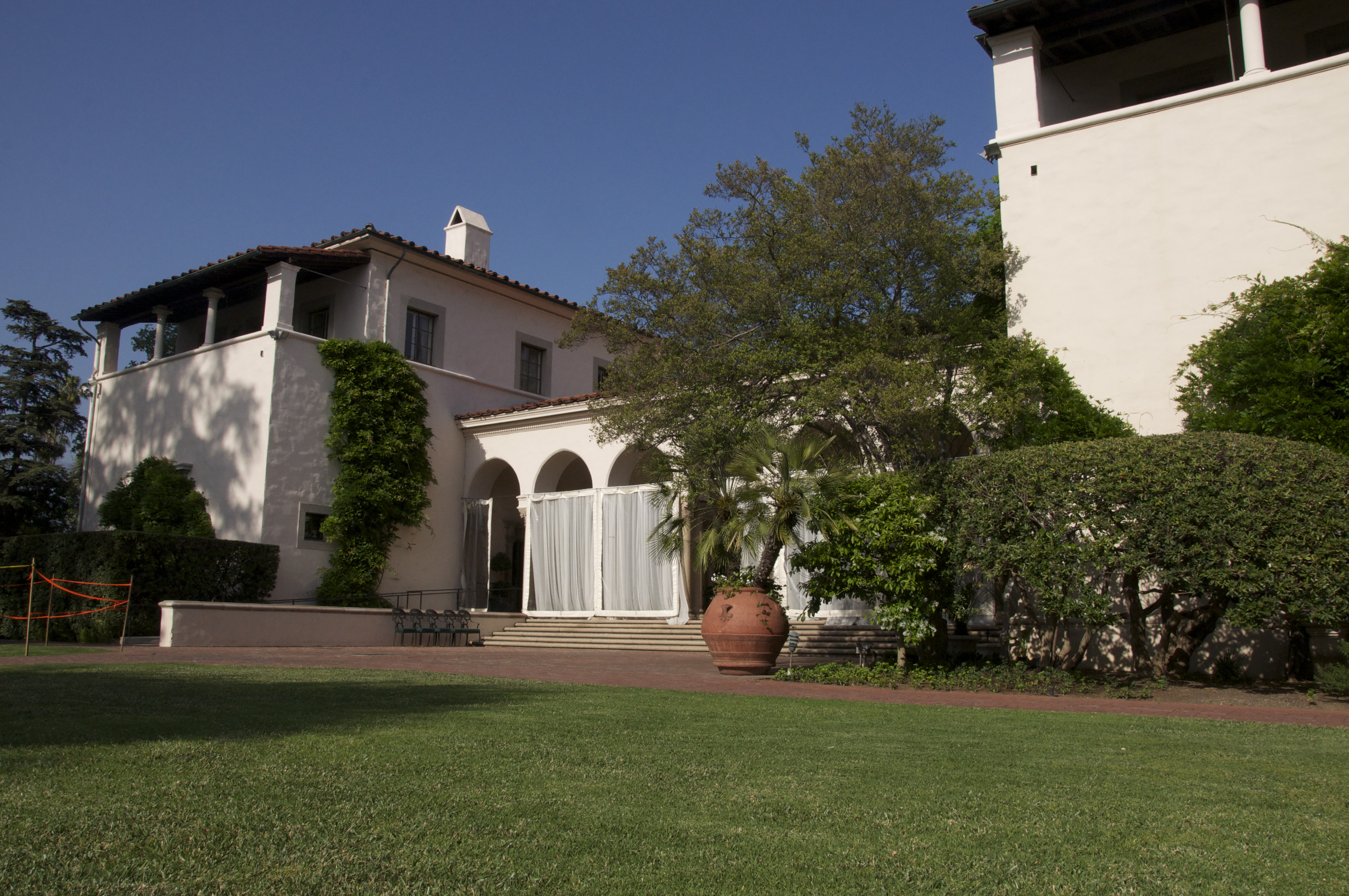
- Exterior view of the Athenaeum
- Alternative names: Athenaeum at Caltech

General information
- Location: Campus of the California Institute of Technology
- Inaugurated: 1930

Design and construction
- Other designers: Gordon Kaufmann

The Athenaeum is a faculty and private social club on the California Institute of Technology campus in Pasadena, California.

== Building ==
The Athenaeum was designed by Gordon Kaufmann in the Mediterranean Revival style, with landscape design by Florence Yoch and Lucile Council, and opened in 1930. It includes a restaurant, bar, private hotel rooms, and serves as Caltech's Faculty Club. The Athenaeum has several named suites, including the Einstein Suite, where Albert Einstein stayed during his visits to Caltech.

Einstein stayed in the loggia during his annual winter visits to Caltech.

== Members ==
Membership numbers over 4000 and includes Caltech faculty, staff, graduate students, undergraduate seniors, alumni, trustees, and Associates of the California Institute of Technology, and staff of the Jet Propulsion Laboratory (JPL), the Palomar Observatory, and the nearby Huntington Library and Art Gallery.

Notable regulars at the Athenaeum Round Table have included:

- David Baltimore
- Robert Christy
- Lee Alvin DuBridge
- Richard Feynman
- William Alfred Fowler
- Scott Fraser
- Jesse L. Greenstein
- Charles Christian Lauritsen
- Maarten Schmidt

== See also ==
- List of American gentlemen's clubs
