= Reginald Davis Johnson =

American architect

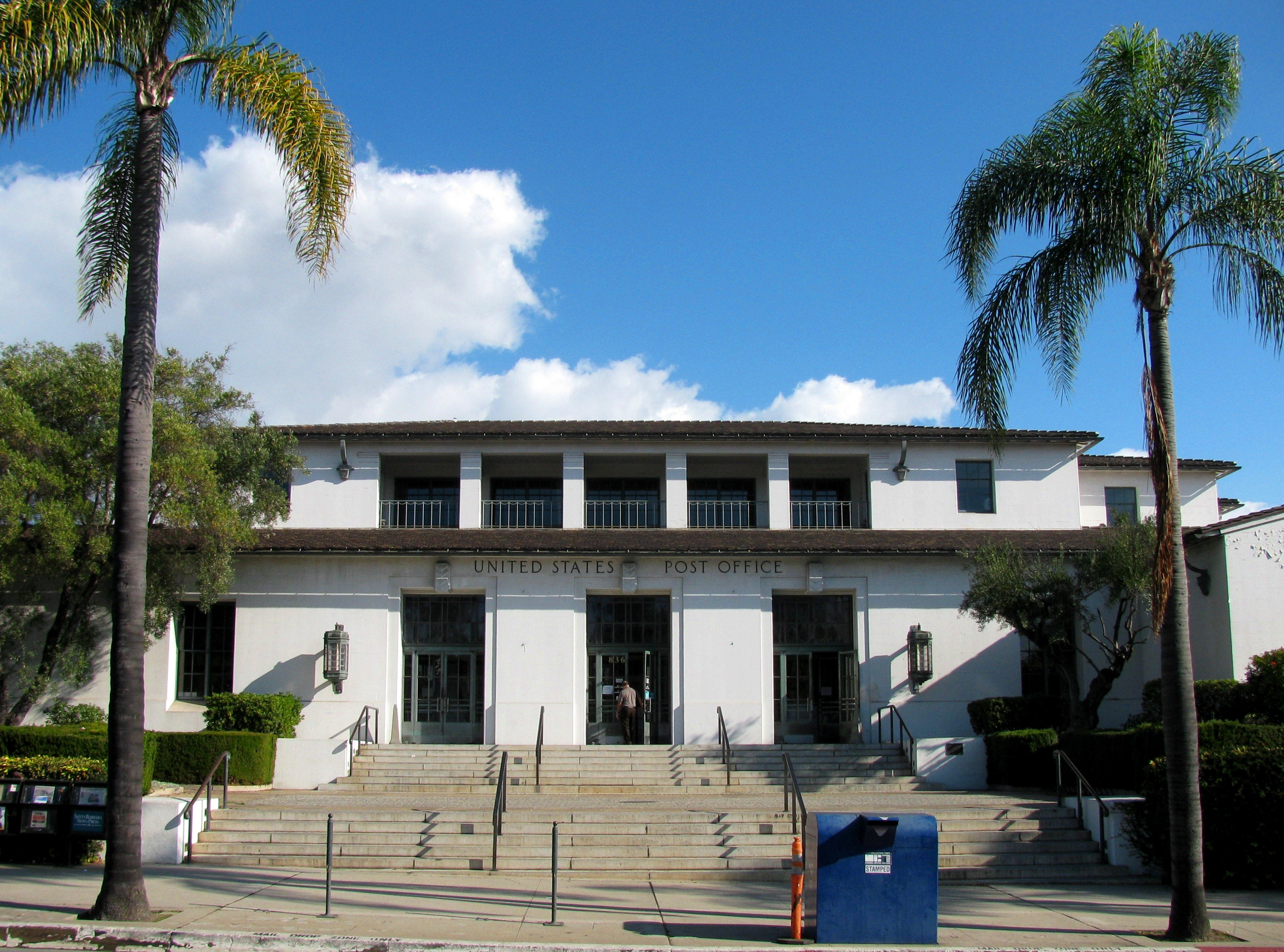
Santa Barbara Post Office (93101). Reginald Johnson, architect, 1936. Commissioned as part of the New Deal

Reginald Davis Johnson (1882–1952) was an American architect. His practice, based in Pasadena, California, focused on the Los Angeles area and southern California in general, with a mixture of residential and commercial work. Johnson's later work was influenced by his progressive ideas on housing policy.

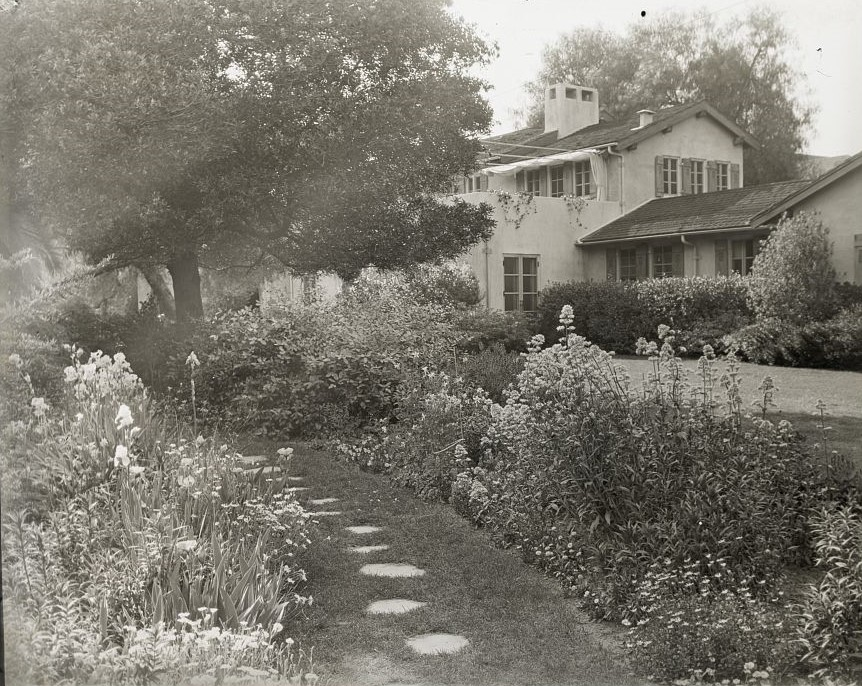
Charles Francis Paxton house, 1160 South Orange Grove Boulevard, Pasadena. Reginald Davis Johnson, architect, completed 1919. Landscape: Renelje Schenck (Mrs. Charles F.) Paxton. Today: House relocated to South Pasadena

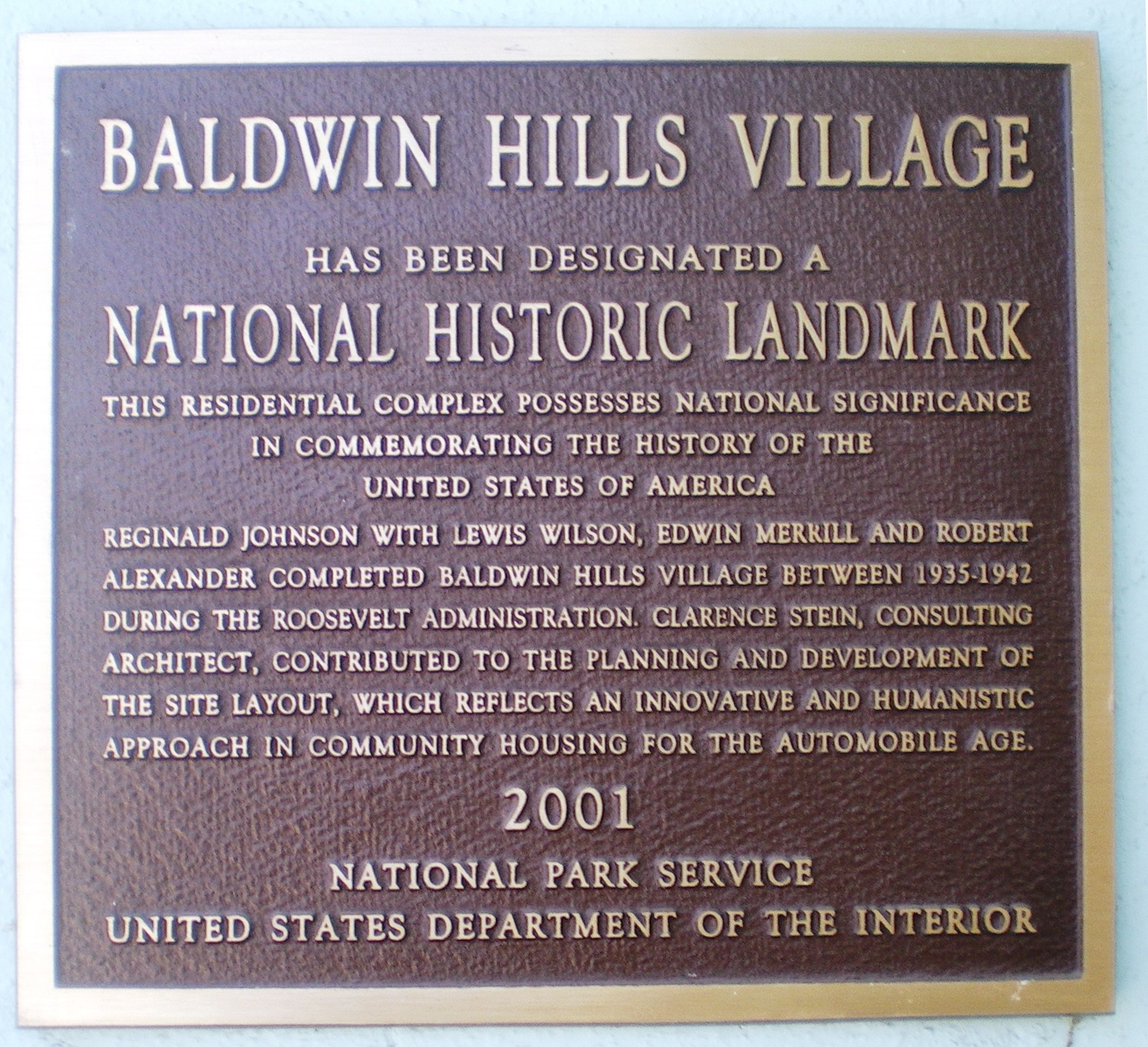
Baldwin Hills Village, Landmark Plaque

Johnson was born in New York state on July 19, 1882, the son of Joseph Horsfall Johnson, who would become the first Episcopal bishop of Los Angeles from 1896 to 1928. Johnson studied architecture in Paris and then attended the Massachusetts Institute of Technology, graduating in 1910 and returned to Pasadena. His father would consecrate St. Paul's Cathedral in Los Angeles in 1924, designed by Reginald. Johnson made a good living in the 1920s designing houses in Montecito and Pasadena. Johnson made his name by designing houses for the rich, but also designed more affordable housing, a cause that assumed greater importance to him as the Great Depression wore on. In 1931, Johnson won an award for best design for a small house, receiving the award from Herbert Hoover. Johnson designed Rancho San Pedro for Los Angeles as a public housing project in 1939. Through the 1930s Johnson worked on the design of Baldwin Hills Village in Los Angeles, which was designed as an up-to-date community of inexpensive housing. Johnson collaborated with Clarence Stein, the planner of Radburn, New Jersey, and the development was named by the American Institute of Architects as one of the 100 most important architectural achievements in American history.

== Works ==
- Santa Barbara Country Club ("Miraflores") (1909, rebuilt 1913, altered 1915 by Reginald D. Johnson) now the Music Academy of the West
- Charles and Stephanie (daughter of William H. Workman) Masson Residence, Boyle Heights (1913). Relocated across the street in 1943
- Saint Saviour's Chapel (Harvard-Westlake School) (1914)
- Charles Francis Paxton house, 1160 South Orange Grove Boulevard, Pasadena (1919), relocated to South Pasadena
- Tanglewood (Lotusland), Santa Barbara (1919), remodeled by George Washington Smith
- Woodward House, Birmingham, AL (1922), built for Birmingham businessman Allen Harvey Woodward and his wife, Annie Jemison Woodward
- All Saints Episcopal Church, Pasadena (1923)
- St. Paul's Cathedral, Los Angeles (1924), demolished 1979
- Hale Solar Laboratory and Solar Observatory, Pasadena (1924) (NHL)
- Santa Barbara Biltmore Hotel (1927)
- Cate School (1928–29)
- Rancho San Carlos, the estate belonging to the Jackson family in Montecito, California (1929)
- Baldwin Hills Village (1932)
- Bellosguardo, the summer home of Huguette Clark and her mother, Anna LaChapelle Clark, in Santa Barbara (1933)
- Santa Barbara Post Office (1937)
- Good Samaritan Hospital, Los Angeles, replaced 1976
- Flintridge Riding Club
- La Valencia Hotel, La Jolla, California
