= Florence Yoch =

American architect

- Born: July 15, 1890; Santa Ana, California
- Died: 1972 (aged 81–82)
- Education: University of California, Berkeley; Cornell University, University of Illinois at Urbana-Champaign
- Occupation: Architect
- Practice: Florence Yoch & Lucile Council

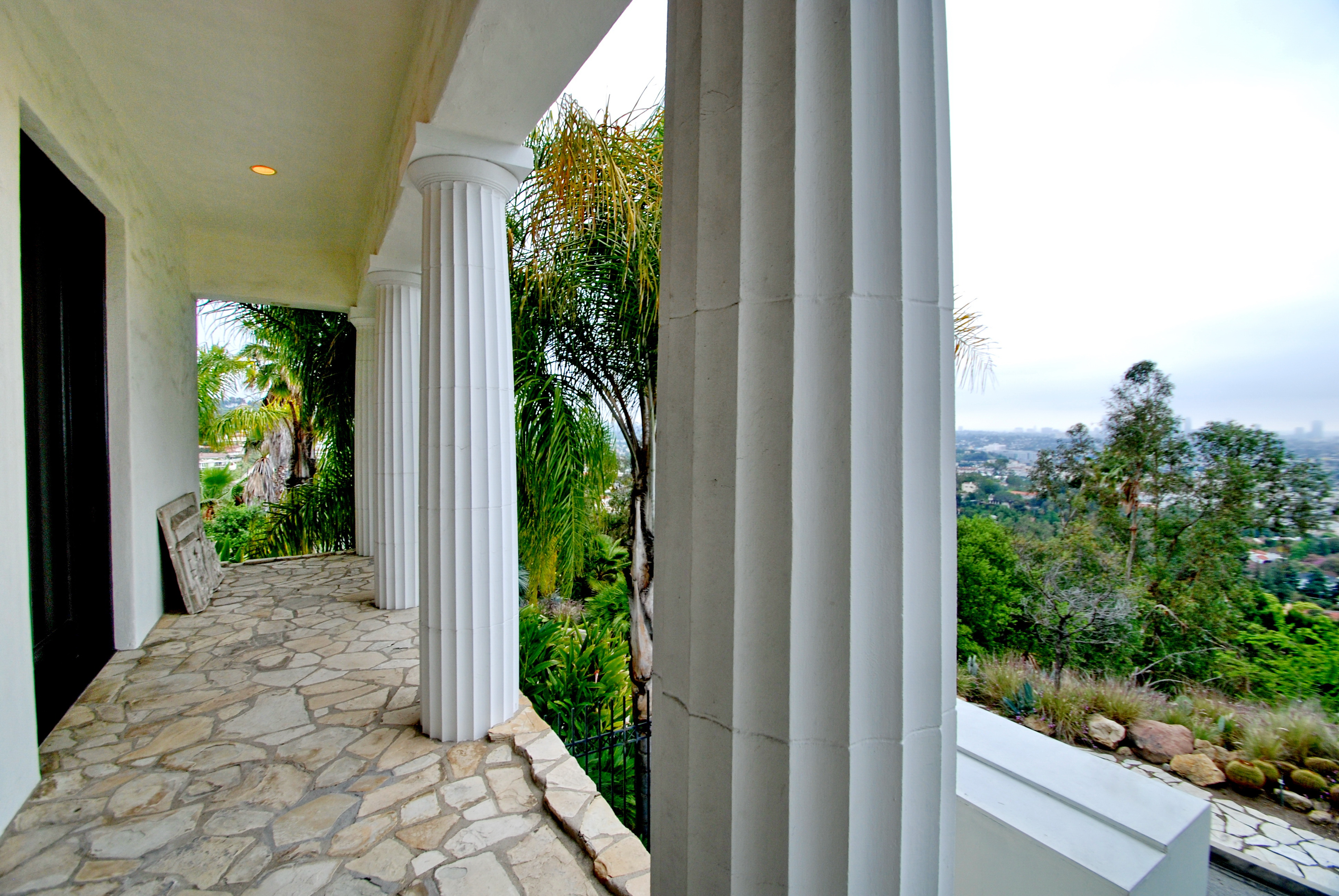

Florence Yoch (1890–1972) was an American landscape architect in California who was active from 1915 through the 1950s. Her career included commissions for private residential clients, parks, public spaces, and film sets for Hollywood movies, including the grounds for Tara in Gone with the Wind. Many credit Florence with helping develop a distinctively Californian interpretation of classic European Gardens.

== Early years ==
Florence Yoch was born in Santa Ana, California on July 15, 1890 to Joseph and Catherine Yoch. The youngest of six girls, Yoch spent much of her time outdoors which included horse and buggy trips from the family home in Santa Ana to the beachfront hotel they owned and operated in Laguna Beach. Yoch was surrounded by the cultural pursuits offered in Laguna Beach which included art, drama and gardening. Close friends and frequent visitors to the Laguna Hotel were Madame Modjeska and her husband Count Karol Bozenta Chlapowski whose own house and garden at Arden further inspired Yoch to pursue a career in landscape design.

Florence Yoch's college education began in 1910 at the University of California, Berkeley and then at Cornell's College of Agriculture. She would go on to earn her degree from the University of Illinois at Urbana-Champaign in 1915.

== Landscape design career ==
Upon graduation, Yoch immediately went to work designing gardens in Pasadena and Orange County. Her influences include the formal gardens of France and the wilder, flowery gardens of England, particularly those designed by Gertrude Jekyll. She made many trips to Europe on sketching trips, focusing on great gardens of the past. In 1921, she hired as apprentices Katherine Bashford (who would leave to found her own solo practice in 1923) and Lucile Council, who had studied at both the Cambridge School of Domestic and Landscape Architecture and at Oxford. In 1925, Florence and Lucile formed a partnership, Yoch & Council, setting up shop in the garden studio at Council's home in South Pasadena. From there they would enjoy a thriving business creating landscaping for a large roster of clients that ranged from wealthy clientele in Pasadena and Santa Barbara to Hollywood players such as Jack L. Warner, George Cukor and David O. Selznick. Cukor referred to her as "a distinguished American artist".

In addition to Gone with the Wind (1939), Florence Yoch also did landscaping and created film sets for The Garden of Allah (1936), Romeo and Juliet (1936), The Good Earth (1937), and How Green Was My Valley (1941). She was especially inspired by two books: Italian Villas and Their Gardens (1904) by Edith Wharton and Gardens for Small Country Houses (1914) by Gertrude Jekyll and Lawrence Weaver.
