= Charles Lee Powell =

- Born: Charles Lee Powell; March 27, 1863; Kentucky, United States
- Died: September 16, 1959 (aged 96); Los Angeles, California, United States
- Education: University of California, Berkeley
- Occupations: Civil engineer, industrialist
- Known for: Innovations in reinforced concrete construction
- Notable work: Powell Laboratories, Contributions to civil engineering
- Spouse: Mary Powell

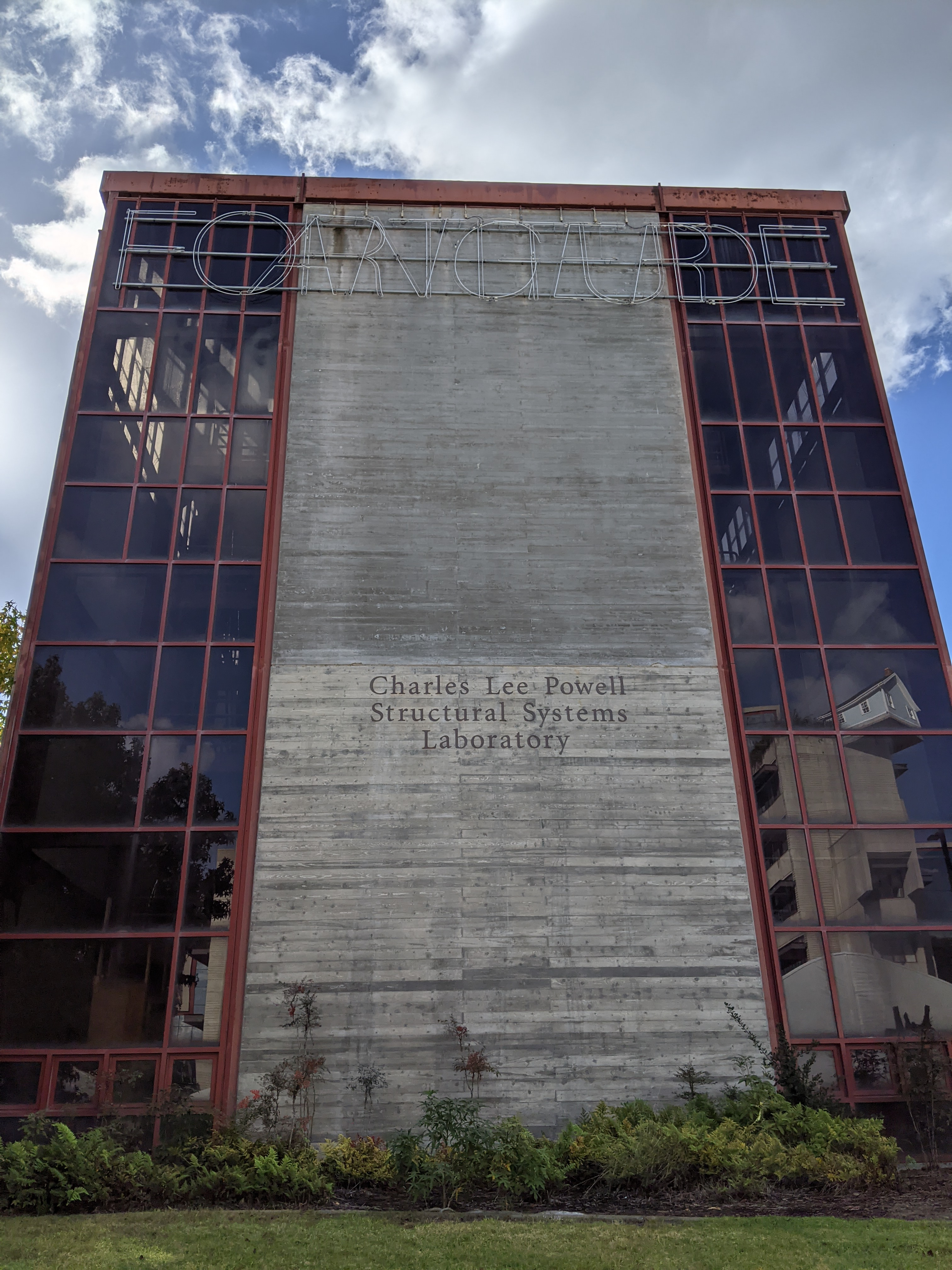
Charles Lee Powell Structural Systems Laboratory at the Jacobs School of Engineering, UC San Diego

Charles Lee Powell (March 19, 1863 – July 22, 1959) was an American structural engineer and entrepreneur. He invented and patented new methods for building concrete structures underground, and is credited with building much of Los Angeles’ early infrastructure, including the Second and Third Street Tunnels, the Angels Flight funicular railway in the Bunker Hill district, and downtown sewerage systems. He was born in Virginia, and died at age 96 in Los Angeles, California.

He was also very well known as a philanthropist and set up many fellowships and research grants. Since the opening of the first Powell Laboratory in 1986, the Charles Lee Powell Foundation has donated over $96 million in grant monies, including over three decades of giving to UC San Diego's Jacob School of Engineering. The Foundation's focus is supporting groundbreaking engineering programs at USC, Caltech, Stanford, and UC San Diego. Its grants to USC School of Engineering have included funding the Charles Lee Powell Hall of Information Sciences and Systems Engineering, named Chairs in Computer Engineering and Electrical Engineering, and the Charles Lee Powell Foundation Photonics Industrial Laboratory.

The University of Southern California has a Charles Lee Powell Hall designed by William Pereira in his honor.
