= Florence Yoch and Lucile Council =

American landscape designers

Florence Theresa Yoch (July 15, 1890 – January 31, 1972) and Lucile Council (November 17, 1898 – January 21, 1964) were influential California landscape designers, practicing in the first half of the 20th century in Southern California.

== Biography ==
Florence Yoch was born in Orange County, California. She attended the University of California, Berkeley, Cornell University and finally the University of Illinois at Urbana–Champaign where she obtained a degree in Landscape Gardening. She began her practice in Pasadena in 1918 and was joined by Lucile Council in 1921, who consequently became her work and life partner. Council was born in Williamsville, Illinois.

Their landscape design works include:

- The estate of Howard Huntington, a Henry E. Huntington heir, in Pasadena.
- The equestrian estate of Will Keith Kellogg in the Pomona Valley, the present day campus of Cal Poly Pomona.
- 'Il Brolino' estate with topiary garden in Montecito,
- The Getty House gardens in Windsor Square, Los Angeles.
- Rancho Los Alamitos in Long Beach, California.
- Bowen House, Hancock Park
- Athenaeum at Caltech
- The George Cukor gardens in the Hollywood Hills, Los Angeles - over several decades.
- The Jack L. Warner estate in Beverly Hills - present day Jeff Bezos estate.
- The David O. Selznick estate in Beverly Hills.
- The Ebell of Los Angeles.
- Dorothy Dobbins Freeman Garden in Pasadena, California
- Los Mochis Sinaloa, Mexico. Benjamin Francis Johnston garden

Florence Yoch was greatly inspired by European gardens and influenced by the work of Gertrude Jekyll.

== Movie sets ==
- Romeo and Juliet (1936)
- Rice terraces in The Good Earth (1937)
- Exterior of 'Tara' in Gone with the Wind (1939)
