= Gordon Kaufmann =

American architect (1888–1949)

Gordon Bernie Kaufmann
- Born: 19 March 1888; Forest Hill, London, United Kingdom
- Died: 1 March 1949 (aged 60); Los Angeles, California, US
- Education: London Polytechnic Institute
- Occupation: architect
- Known for: Work on the Hoover Dam
- Spouse(s): Eva A. Kaufmann (two sons); Elsie S. Bryant

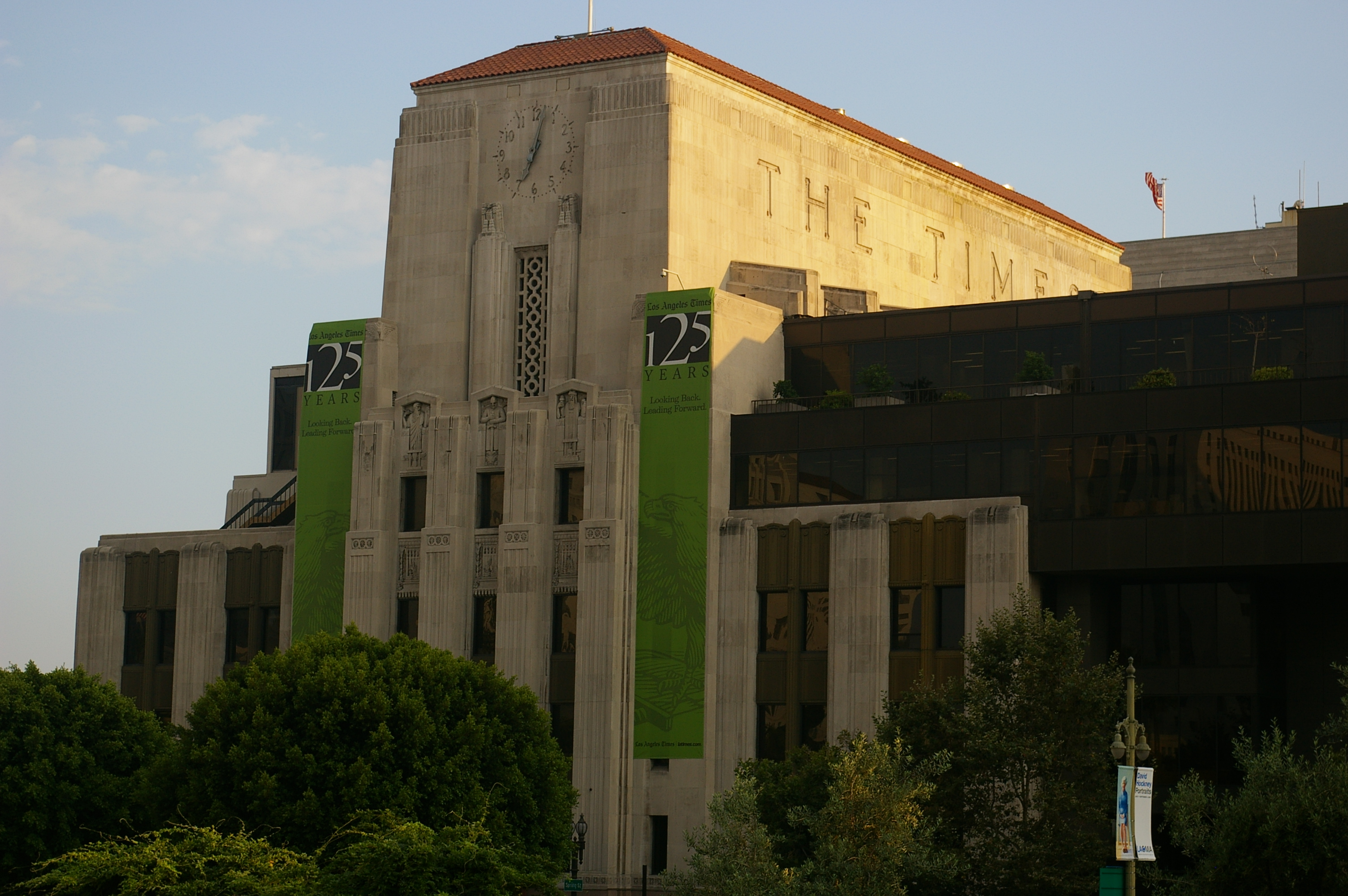
Kaufmann's Los Angeles Times building

Gordon Bernie Kaufmann (19 March 1888 – 1 March 1949) was an English-born American architect mostly known for his work on the Hoover Dam.

== Early life ==
On 19 March 1888, Kaufmann was born in Forest Hill, London, England.

== Education ==
Kaufmann attended Whitgift School in South Croydon, and went on to graduate from the London Polytechnic Institute, circa 1908. Kaufmann then moved to Vancouver in British Columbia, where he spent the next six years.

== Career ==
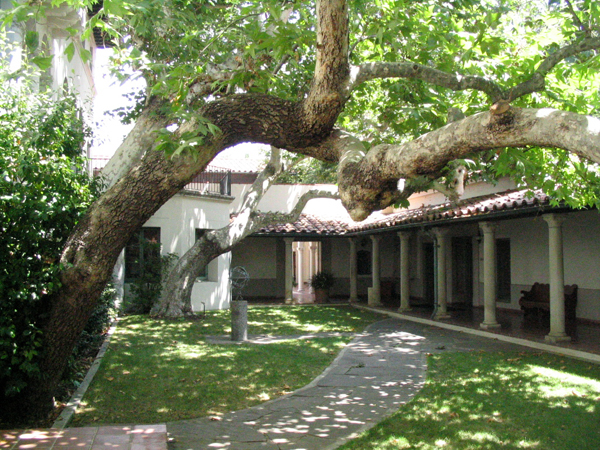
Scripps College

During Kaufmann's early career, he did much work in the Mediterranean Revival Style, which had become popular at that time. He was also the initial architect for Scripps College, a liberal arts women's college in Claremont, California. It is a member of the Claremont Colleges.

Kaufmann, along with landscape architect Edward Huntsman-Trout, designed the general campus plan featuring four residence halls to be built the first four consecutive years of the College (1927–1930). The project's design is primarily in the Mediterranean Revival style.

While gaining recognition for Kaufmann's work on the Scripps campus, he was also hired by California Institute of Technology in 1928 to design the complex of dormitories now known as the South Houses, and the building for the Athenaeum, a private club located on the school's campus.

Later in his career, Kaufmann worked primarily in the Art Deco style, with a personal emphasis on massively thick, streamlined concrete walls which gave his buildings a very distinctive appearance. Kaufmann's buildings as a result took on a very "mechanical" appearance, often resembling huge versions of old-fashioned appliances. The Los Angeles Times' headquarters is a perfect example of this. His work was also part of the architecture event in the art competition at the 1936 Summer Olympics.

== Projects ==
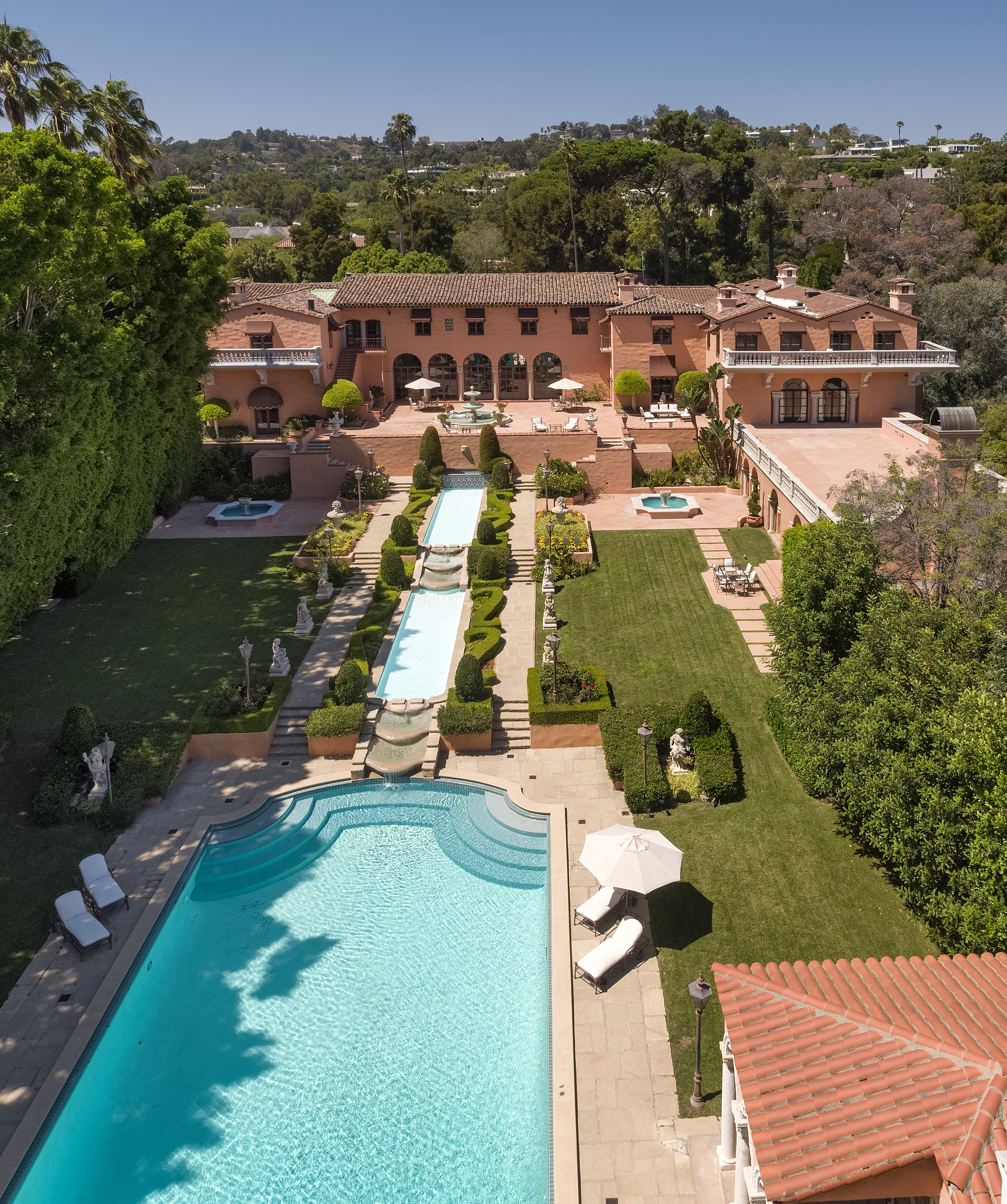
Milton Getz House

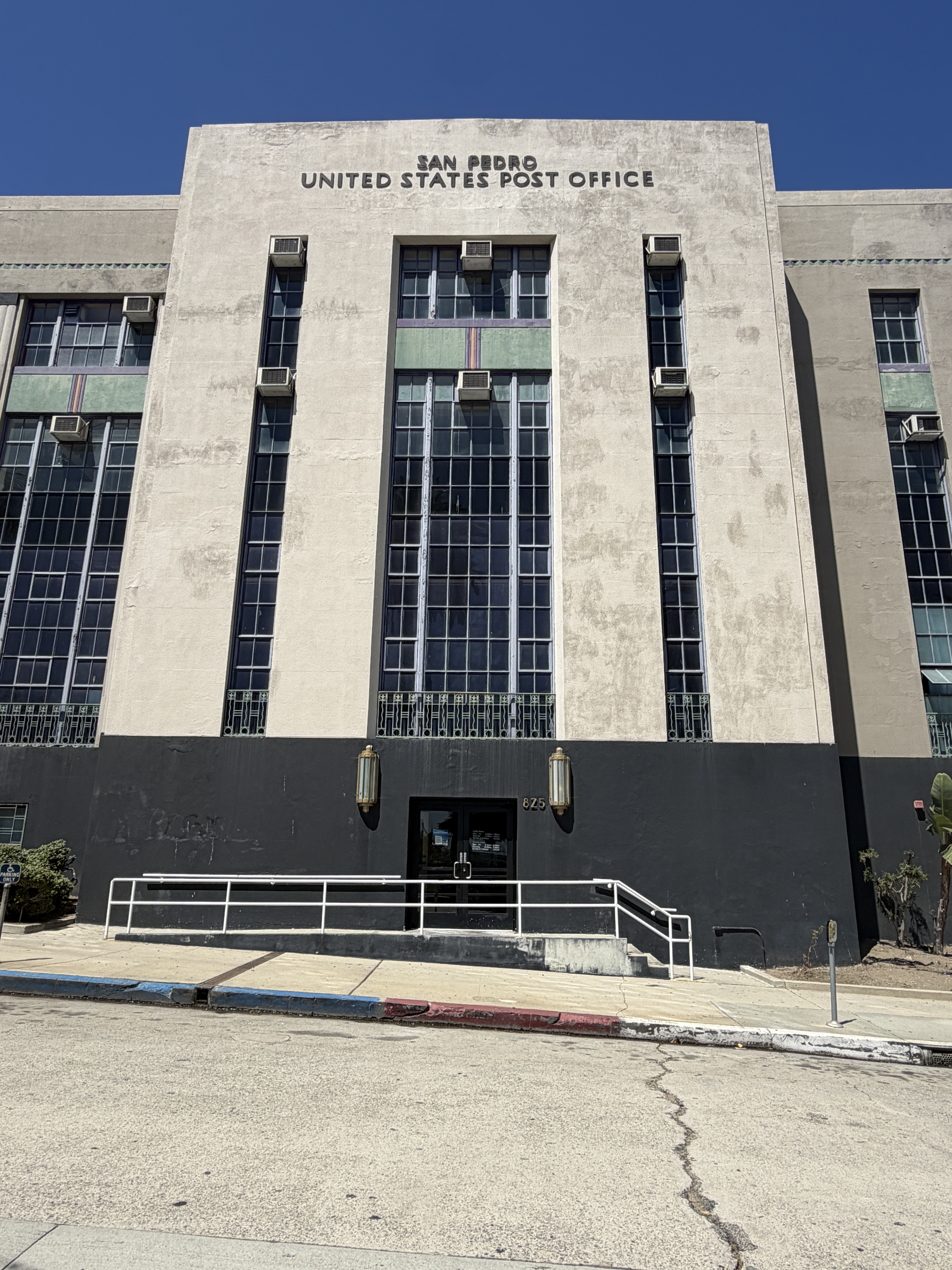
San Pedro Post Office

Notable Kaufmann projects include (in California unless otherwise noted):

- Hacienda del Gato, La Quinta (1920)
- Hale Solar Laboratory, Pasadena (1924), NRHP-listed
- La Quinta Resort & Club, La Quinta (1926)
- Milton Getz House, Beverly Hills (1926)
- Scripps College for Women, Claremont (1926)
- Greystone Mansion, Beverly Hills (1928), NRHP-listed
- Holmby Hall, Los Angeles (1929)
- Athenaeum, Pasadena (1930)
- Harper Hall, Claremont (1932)
- Santa Anita Park, Arcadia (1934)
- Hoover Dam, Arizona and Nevada (1935), NRHP-listed
- Los Angeles Times Building, Los Angeles (1935)
- San Pedro Post Office, Los Angeles (1936), with W. Horace Austin, NRHP-listed
- Earl Carroll Theatre, Los Angeles (1938)
- Arrowhead Springs Hotel, San Bernardino (1939)
- Hollywood Palladium, Los Angeles, (1940)
- Musicians Union of Hollywood Building, Los Angeles (1950)

== Personal life ==
In 1914, Kaufmann moved to California and settled in Fresno, California. Kaufmann's wife was Elsie Bryant Kaufmann. On 1 March 1949, Kaufmann died in Los Angeles California. Kaufmann is buried in Golden Gate National Cemetery in San Bruno, California.
