= Music rehearsal space =

Room used for rehearsal purposes and recording of musical pieces

A music rehearsal space is a room or number of rooms dedicated to music-making. A professionally soundproofed practice room(s) is an acoustic environment defined by its purpose and layout, designed to keep sound inside and unwanted sound out (The music rehearsal space). Spaces can combine rehearsal and recording functions. Music rehearsal spaces are unique in response to their users, location and the building they are housed in developed over several years. Rehearsal spaces serve local musicians and to make access easy are usually located in urban areas. There are many places used by musicians, ensembles and bands for rehearsing, including makeshift rooms and shared areas such as halls and community centers.

== Importance of music rehearsal spaces to musicians ==
A dedicated music rehearsal space gives musicians the space to perfect their ensemble music-making, compositions and performance skills. Regular rehearsals disciplines the musicians, honing their music-making before performing in front of an audience. A good space enables and nurtures the music-making process. It should help musicians to feel comfortable, encouraging freedom of expression and implicitly agreed by its users as a safe place to explore ideas. Accessibility is a major factor too because music instruments and equipment can be bulky and heavy.

Musicians may not necessarily rehearse and prepare for shows in the same space as they live. This is due to a sonic requirement for space. Loud volume will need to be tolerated by landlords, tenants and the building’s physical structure. These particular space requirements are not appropriate for residential and most commercial spaces. Although there may be plenty of commercial space available, sound proofing and acoustic treatment can be costly, requiring technical know-how often beyond the capabilities of the average person. These particular space requirements have left a specialised niche market which has been filled by rehearsal space businesses.

The National Museums Liverpool in the UK asserts a variety of spaces are used for music rehearsals. Many are run on a commercial basis solely for band rehearsals. Music rehearsal spaces enable musicians to practice new songs and support local music scenes. In Liverpool in the 1980s two important rehearsal spaces were Vulcan Studios and The Ministry set up in old Victorian warehouses and used by many local rock musicians.

BBC News in 2006 reported the opening of a music rehearsal space in Wrexham in Wales in the UK. Many musicians had no option but to practise in bedrooms or garages, so Wrexham Council donated a rehearsal space to develop local bands. At its launch, the Welsh Economic Development Minister Andrew Davies, highlighted the significance of the music industry to the UK economy, and by providing space for musicians to work on their music will help sustain the local music scene.

The UK's Musicians' Union's Winter 2015 edition of its Musicians Journal published an article titled "How to find and make the most of a rehearsal studio" (p. 36). Rehearsal spaces play an important role in the preparation of live and recorded music. Its author, Neil Crossley, concluded an informal measure of an effective rehearsal space is the rate at which a band develops. Good rehearsal spaces support musicians to flourish by providing great room acoustics, excellent facilities, a friendly atmosphere and convenient location.

The UK's TPi Awards acknowledges and rewards the achievements of individuals and service companies working within the live production industry. One of its 27 annual awards categories is Favourite Rehearsal Facility

Space affects the quality and performance of music. In some cases small environments are not ideal for rehearsing ensembles. Due to the limited size of some practice rooms, the artistry of musicians interacting with one another may be lost.

Owning and running a music rehearsal space requires a range of skills, including business planning, knowledge of music equipment and instruments, building and personnel management and legal matters.

== Commercial music rehearsal spaces ==
Rehearsal facilities often supply high quality equipment and on-hand expertise used by amateur and professional musicians preparing for gigs and recordings. Spaces often rent their space by the hour, session or day, and extra services such as instrument and equipment hire. Commercial spaces typically have flexible opening hours because some musicians prefer to work at weekends and late at night.

Music rehearsal spaces are concerned with talent development. As most commercially operated spaces are small, localised and not networked, their overall economic significance goes unnoticed, over-shadowed by the larger economic force of the corporate live and recorded music sectors. The value of the physical space to music-making can often be overlooked in favour of the creative process.

Commercial spaces usually offer variable hire rates according to the following:

- size of practice room
- time of day
- length of session
- weekday or weekend
- block-booking discounts
- whether equipment and/or instruments are supplied

Spaces do not work at full capacity. Some sub-let rooms to groups or individuals on a semi-permanent basis who in turn often hire out to third parties to recoup their rent. This is commonly known as a music lockout.

The incidence of locating music rehearsal spaces in deprived areas, often away from residential areas, is more attractive due to affordable property, concentration of cheaper housing for artists and areas of social, cultural and economic regeneration.

== The music rehearsal space economy ==
A music rehearsal space exists according to the size of the community it serves and how it is financed. Some can be for general purposes, while others may specialise. The cost of running a music rehearsal space is such that its support by any given population is limited. With a smaller population it may be difficult to sustain a space: there may be only two practice rooms or even one, jeopardising its very survival. A music rehearsal space represents a great capital investment in equipment and premises.

Roger Martin and Richard Florida at the Martin Prosperity Institute at the University of Toronto’s Rotman School of Management undertook research into the cost of monthly rehearsal spaces for musicians in the City of Toronto, Canada. highlighted the issues of affordability and space for independent musicians in the city. It found the price of easily accessible rehearsal spaces in the central area of the city were the most costly, posing a serious concern in retaining emerging musical talent, forcing many to relocate to other affordable cities.

== Music Education ==
UK Music published Liberating Creativity in 2010. Its Recommendation Five highlighted a need to use public spaces so musicians can practice.

A report commissioned in 2012 by the London music organisation Sound Connections, working in partnership with UK Music, the UK government's Department for Culture, Media & Sport (DCMS) and the UK's Music Industries Association found access to a rehearsal space is an integral part of the career development of young musicians and music ensembles. evaluated a two-year project to establish 14 pilot music rehearsal spaces in urban and rural areas across England for young people aged between 8–25 years. The DCMS spent £440,000 to provide instruments and equipment, and contributed towards the cost of capital works, such as sound proofing. The majority of the spaces were located in local authority owned buildings created in collaboration with local and regional government, youth music organisations and the music industry. The evaluation report found a music space is defined by its purpose and the availability of equipment and instruments.

The UK government's Department for Education and Skills published in 2004 its Music Manifesto. It asserted many young people make music outside school forming 'garage' bands, and writing and playing music in their bedrooms and on their computers. It labelled this form of music-making "informal".

Researchers Dickens and Lonie consider the role played by non-formal educational provision in the geographies of childhood, learning and education where the music rehearsal studio is examined, using case studies.

The consultancy firm Hall Aitken working for the UK government's Department for Children Schools and Families and the Big Lottery Fund]'s £280m Myplace programme produced two good practice guides. The Good practice guide to planning music in Myplace Centres puts forward a planning process using music-making to engage young people at a Myplace youth centre. The guide suggests for many young people the cost of hiring a commercial music rehearsal space is too expensive. The second guide, Good practice guide to running a music facility in Myplace Centres provides information on managing a youth music rehearsal space with ideas for activities.

== Soundproofing ==
The quality of the sound is an important aspect when rehearsing music. Professionally designed music rehearsal spaces will improve the sound of music instruments being played. Substandard acoustics can lead musicians to make the wrong decisions.

Alec Nisbett in his book Sound Studios advances the idea that the acoustic properties of large houses during the seventeenth and eighteenth centuries defined the balance of sounds in the performance of orchestral and chamber music. Music now on the other hand has come to define the physical design of a space to suit different acoustic properties.

Sound Advice works to provide practical guidelines on the control of noise at work in music and entertainment. Its representatives working in the music and entertainment industries together with Environmental Health Officers and the Health and Safety Executive (HSE) recommends using a suitable venue for music rehearsals. Its Note 9 suggests a common problem with practice rooms is they lack physical volume, have low ceilings and limited space for separation between players.

The Sonicbids Blog How to Set Up the Ideal Band Rehearsal Space suggests the positioning of the musicians and equipment is important so each band member can hear what he, she and others are playing.

Ole Adrian Heggli in his MA thesis Room Acoustics for Small Scale Rehearsal Rooms for Pop and Rock Music suggests a rock and pop music practice room requires different acoustic properties compared to classical acoustic music. It specifies the 63 Hz octave band should be considered in designing a practice room and when sourcing absorption material to improve room acoustics.
