= Philadelphia 76ers =

National Basketball Association team in Philadelphia, Pennsylvania

- 2026–27 Philadelphia 76ers season
- Conference: Eastern
- Division: Atlantic
- Founded: 1946
- History: Syracuse Nationals; 1946–1949 (NBL); 1949–1963 (NBA); Philadelphia 76ers 1963–present
- Arena: Xfinity Mobile Arena
- Location: Philadelphia, Pennsylvania
- Team colors: Blue, red, silver, navy, white
- Main sponsor: Bloom Energy
- CEO: Tad Brown
- President: Mike Gansey
- Vice-president: Jameer Nelson
- General manager: Vacant
- Head coach: Nick Nurse
- Ownership: Harris Blitzer Sports & Entertainment; (Josh Harris and David Blitzer) (Note: As managing partners. Limited partners include: David Adelman, Martin Geller, Marc Leder, Will Smith, and Jada Pinkett Smith)
- Affiliation: Delaware Blue Coats
- Championships: 3 (1955, 1967, 1983)
- Conference titles: 5 (1977, 1980, 1982, 1983, 2001)
- Division titles: 12 (1950, 1952, 1955, 1966, 1967, 1968, 1977, 1978, 1983, 1990, 2001, 2021)
- Retired numbers: 10 (2, 3, 4, 6, 10, 13, 15, 24, 32, 34)
- Website: nba.com/sixers
Association	Icon	Statement

The Philadelphia 76ers, known colloquially as the Sixers, are an American professional basketball team based in the Philadelphia metropolitan area. (Note: The team's corporate headquarters and training facility are in Camden, New Jersey, and not the city of Philadelphia itself.) The 76ers compete in the National Basketball Association (NBA) as a member of the Atlantic Division of the Eastern Conference. The team plays its home games at Xfinity Mobile Arena in the South Philadelphia Sports Complex.

The 76ers have won three NBA championships – in 1955 as the Nationals; in 1967, led by Wilt Chamberlain; and in 1983, led by Julius Erving and Moses Malone. The 76ers returned to the NBA Finals in 2001, led by Allen Iverson and losing to the Los Angeles Lakers in five games.

Many Hall of Fame players have played for the organization, including Chamberlain, Erving, Malone, Iverson, Dolph Schayes, Hal Greer, Chet Walker, Billy Cunningham, George McGinnis, Maurice Cheeks, Bobby Jones, and Charles Barkley. Five 76ers players have been the NBA's Most Valuable Player a total of seven times – Chamberlain, Erving, Malone, Iverson, and Joel Embiid.

== History ==
=== 1946–1963: Syracuse Nationals ===
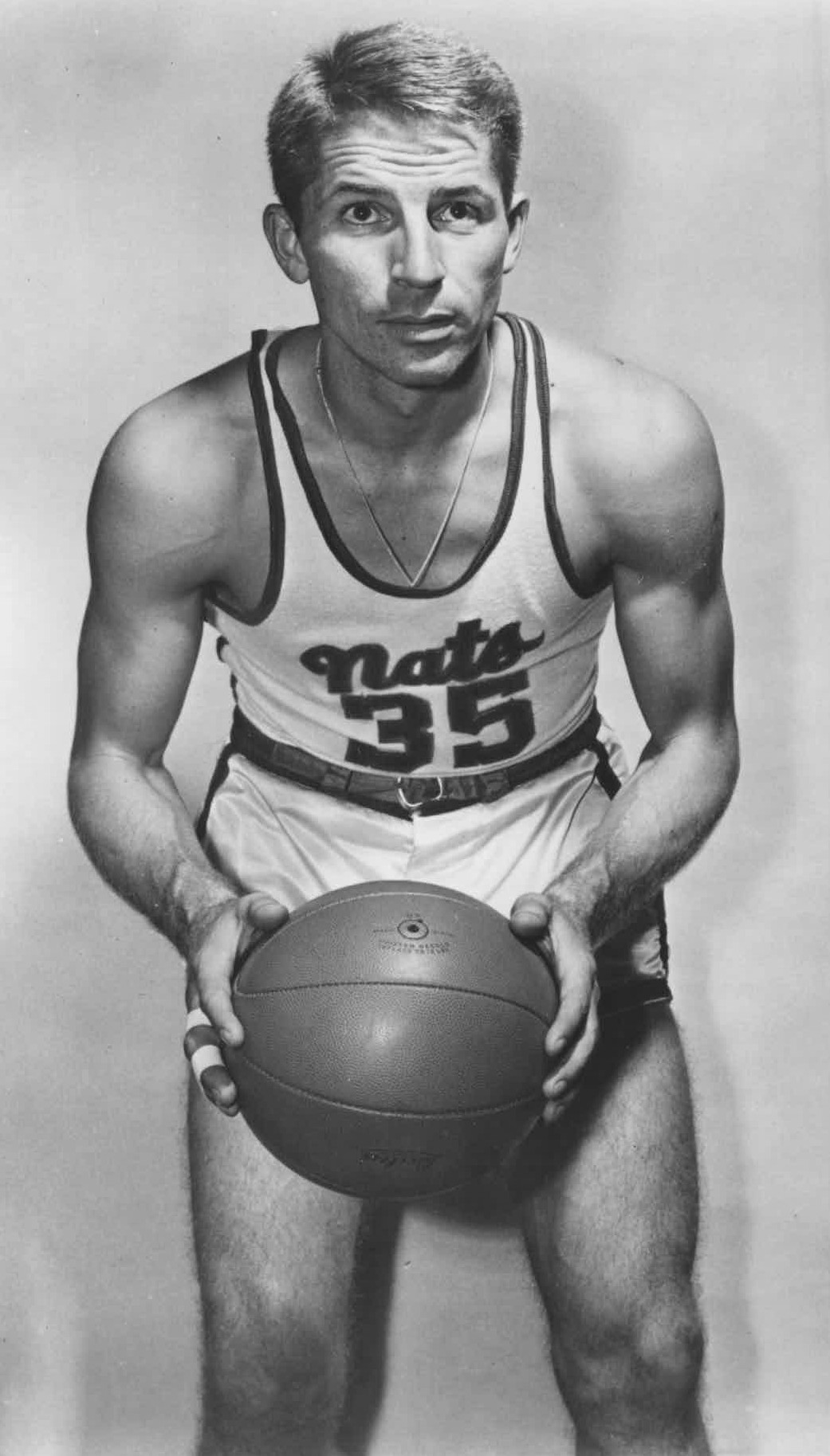
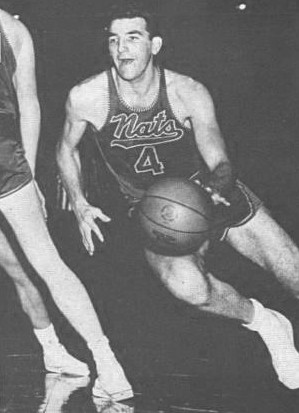
Billy Gabor joined the Syracuse Nationals in 1948. Dolph Schayes joined the team in 1949. Both men spent their entire careers with the team, and won a championship together in 1955.

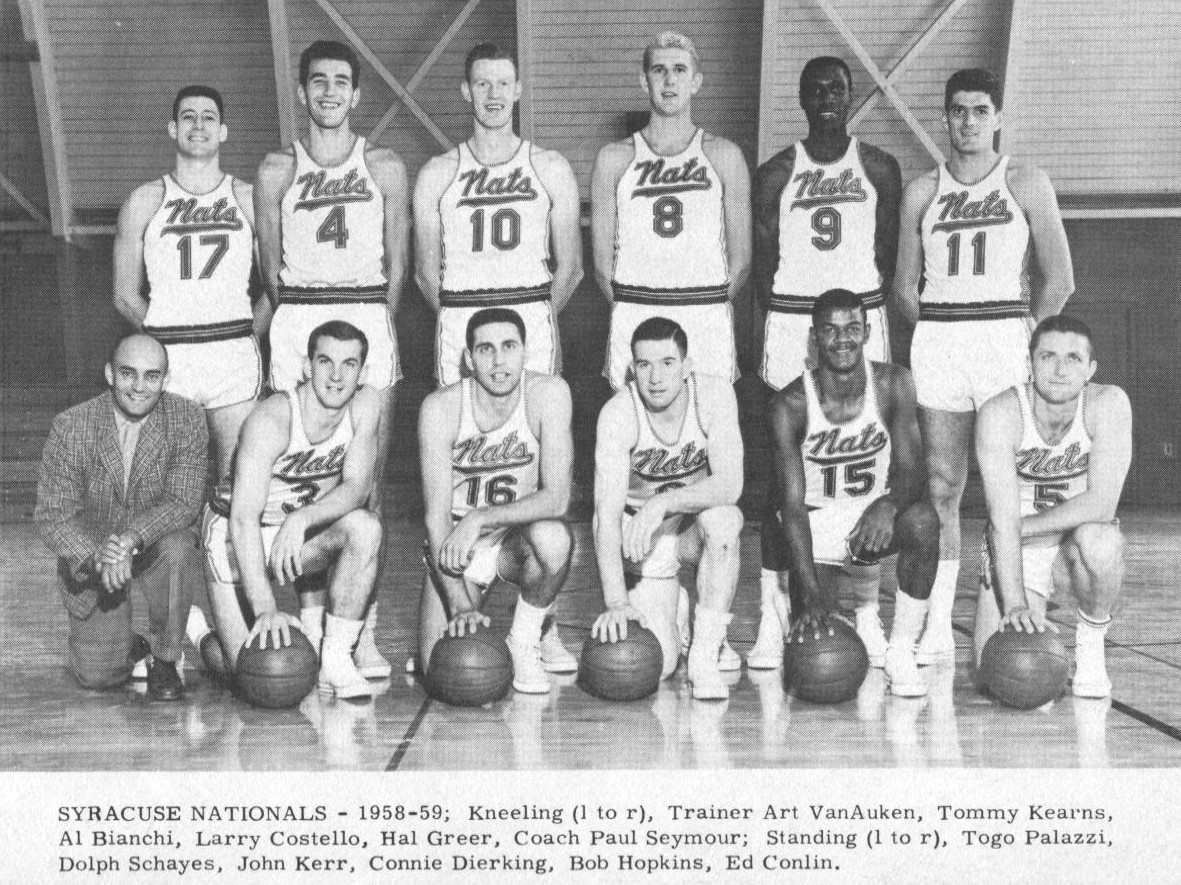
The 1958–59 Syracuse Nationals

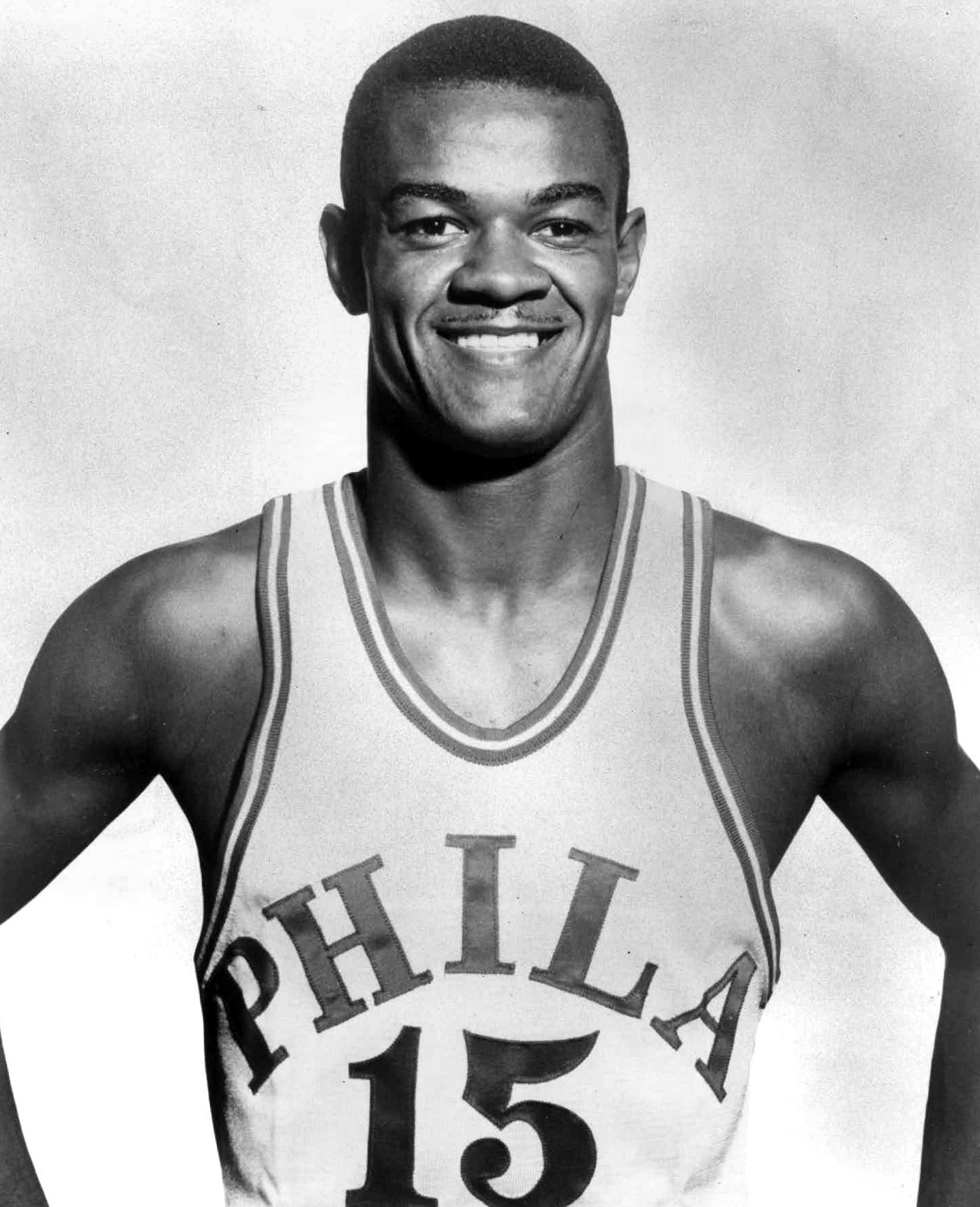
Hal Greer joined the Nationals in 1958 and spent his entire 15-season career with the franchise; he won a championship with the team in 1967.

In 1946, Italian immigrant Danny Biasone established the Syracuse Nationals of the National Basketball League (NBL) in Syracuse, New York, for $5,000. While in the NBL with teams largely consisting of small Midwestern towns, the Nationals put together a 21–23 record, finishing in fourth place. In the playoffs, the Nationals were beaten by the Rochester Royals in four games. In their second season, 1947–48, the Nationals struggled, finishing in fifth place with a 24–36 record. Despite their record, they made the playoffs, and were swept by the Anderson Duffey Packers in three straight games.

Before the 1948–49 season, four teams left the NBL for the BAA as the foundation for a merger was laid. The Nationals "recipe for success" began by recruiting Leo Ferris. Staying in the NBL, Ferris signed Al Cervi to be player-coach and outbid the New York Knicks for the services of Dolph Schayes who made his professional debut, leading the Nationals to a winning record for the first time with a record of 40–23. In the playoffs the Nationals defeated the Hammond Calumet Buccaneers, winning the series in two straight games. In the semifinals, the Nationals lost to the Anderson Duffey Packers for the second straight season in four games. In 1949, when the NBL and the BAA merged into the NBA, the Nationals were one of seven NBL teams that were brought into the NBA. From 1949 to 1956, the team would wear gold on their "Nats" home jersey while wearing gold "Syracuse" jerseys from 1953 to 1956.

The Nationals were an instant success in the NBA, winning the Eastern Division in the 1949–50 season, with a league-best record of 51–13. In the playoffs the Nationals continued to play solid basketball, beating the Philadelphia Warriors in two games. Moving on to the division finals, the Nationals battled the New York Knickerbockers, beating their big-city rivals in a three-game series. In the NBA Finals, the Nationals faced a fellow NBL alum in the Minneapolis Lakers. In game 1 of the Finals the Nationals lost just their second home game of the season, 68–66. The Nationals did not recover, as they fell behind 3–1 before falling in six games.

Despite several teams leaving the NBA for the National Professional Basketball League before the 1950–51 season, the Nationals decided to stay put. In their second NBA season, 1950–51, the Nationals played mediocre basketball all season, finishing in fourth place with a record of 32–34. In the playoffs the Nationals played their best basketball of the season as they stunned the first-place Warriors in two straight, taking game 1 on the road in overtime 91–89. In the division finals, the Nationals were beaten by the New York Knickerbockers in a hard-fought five-game series, losing the finale by just two points.

Cervi, playing less and coaching more, emphasized a patient offense and a scrappy defense, which led the league in the 1951–52 season by yielding a stingy 79.5 points per game as the Nationals won the Eastern Division with a solid 40–26 record. In the playoffs, the Nationals knocked off the Warriors again in a three-game series. In the division finals, the Nationals fell to the Knickerbockers again, dropping the series in four games.

The Nationals finished in second place in a hard-fought 3-way battle for first place in the Eastern Division for the 1952–53 season, with a record of 47–24. In the playoffs, the Nationals faced the Boston Celtics, dropping game 1 at home 87–81. Needing a win in Boston to keep their hopes alive, the Nationals took the Celtics deep into overtime before losing in quadruple OT 111–105, in what remains the longest playoff game in NBA history.

The Nationals acquired Alex Groza, and Ralph Beard as the Indianapolis Olympians folded leaving the NBA with just nine teams for the 1953–54 season. Once again the Nationals battled for the Division title, falling two games short with a 42–30 record. In the playoffs, the Nationals won all four games of a round-robin tournament involving the three playoff teams from the East. In the division finals, the Nationals beat the Celtics in two straight games. In the NBA Finals, the Nationals lost to the Lakers in a hard-fought seven-game series where the two teams alternated wins throughout.

With the NBA struggling financially and down to just eight teams during the 1954–55 season, Nationals owner Biasone suggested the league limit the amount of time that could be taken for a shot, thus speeding up a game that often ended with long periods of teams just holding the ball and playing keep away. Biasone and Nationals' general manager Ferris calculated a 24-second shot clock would allow at least 30 shots per quarter, speeding up the game and increasing scoring. The shot clock was an instant success as scoring was up 14 points per game league-wide. In the first season of the shot clock, the Nationals would take first place in the East with a 43–29 record. After a first-round bye the Nationals would beat the Celtics in four games to reach the NBA Finals for the second straight season. In the Finals the Nationals would get off to a fast start, led by forward Schayes, taking the first two games at home against the Fort Wayne Pistons. As the series moved to Fort Wayne the Pistons would spark back to life taking all three games to take a 3–2 series lead. Back in Syracuse for game 6 on, the Nationals kept their championship hopes alive by beating the Pistons 109–104 to force a seventh game at home. Game 7 would be as tight as the series as George King sank a free throw to give the Nationals a 92–91 lead in the final seconds. King then stole the inbound pass to clinch the NBA championship for the Nationals.

Coming off their NBA championship the Nationals struggled during the 1955–56 season, needing a tiebreaker over the Knickerbockers to avoid finishing in last place and make the playoffs with a 35–37 record. In the playoffs, the Nationals stunned the Celtics by winning the first-round series in three games, taking the final two. In the division finals, the Nationals played solid basketball again as they pushed the Warriors to a decisive fifth game. The Nationals' reign as defending champions ended with a 109–104 loss in Philadelphia. After the season, the team dropped gold from their uniforms, wearing just red and blue for the remainder of their tenure.

The Nationals got off to a slow start as coach Cervi was fired and replaced by Paul Seymour. Under Seymour, the Nationals rebounded and finished the 1956–57 season in second place with a record of 38–34. In the playoffs, the Nationals had trouble knocking off the defending champion Warriors but advanced to the division finals with two straight wins. The Nationals were swept in three games by the eventual champions, the Celtics.

Fort Wayne and Rochester had moved on to Detroit and Cincinnati for the 1957–58 season, leaving the Syracuse Nationals as the last small-town team in the big city NBA. Regardless, they still finished in second place with a 41–31 record. In the playoffs, the Nationals fell in the first round as they lost a three-game series to the Philadelphia Warriors.

Despite a mediocre 35–37 record for the 1958–59 season the Nationals made the playoffs again by finishing in third place. In the playoffs, the Nationals swept the Knickerbockers in two straight to reach the division finals, where they lost to the eventual champion Celtics, alternating wins before losing by five points in game 7.

Playing in a league now dominated by superstars like Bill Russell of the Celtics, Wilt Chamberlain of the Warriors, Bob Pettit of the St. Louis Hawks and Elgin Baylor of the Lakers, the Nationals held their own, posting a solid 45–30 record, while finishing in third place after the 1959–60 regular season. In the playoffs, the Nationals lost a three-game series to Chamberlain and the Warriors.

When the Lakers moved from Minneapolis to Los Angeles before the 1960–61 season, the Syracuse Nationals became the last old NBL team to still be playing in their original city in the NBA. The Nationals went on to make the playoffs again by finishing in third place with a 38–41 record. The Nationals were dangerous in the playoffs as they stunned the Warriors in three straight games. In the division finals, the Nationals lost once again to the eventual champion Celtics in five games.

Schayes missed 24 games during the 1961–62 season and failed to lead the team in scoring for the first time in 14 years, as Hal Greer led the way with 22.8 points per game. The Nationals finished in third place again with a 41–39 record. In the playoffs, the Nationals lost their first two games to the Warriors on the road. Facing elimination, the Nationals won the next two games to force a fifth game in Philadelphia. In game 5 the Warriors ended the Nationals' season with a 121–104 victory.

With an aging team, the Nationals were expected to fade; however, with the scrappy play of Johnny Kerr, the Nationals remained a strong contender, finishing in second place for the 1962–63 season, with a record of 48–32. In the playoffs the Nationals faced the Cincinnati Royals, getting off to a 2–1 series lead. Needing one win to advance to the division finals again the Nationals lost two straight, dropping the decisive fifth game at home in overtime 131–127.

=== Move to Philadelphia ===
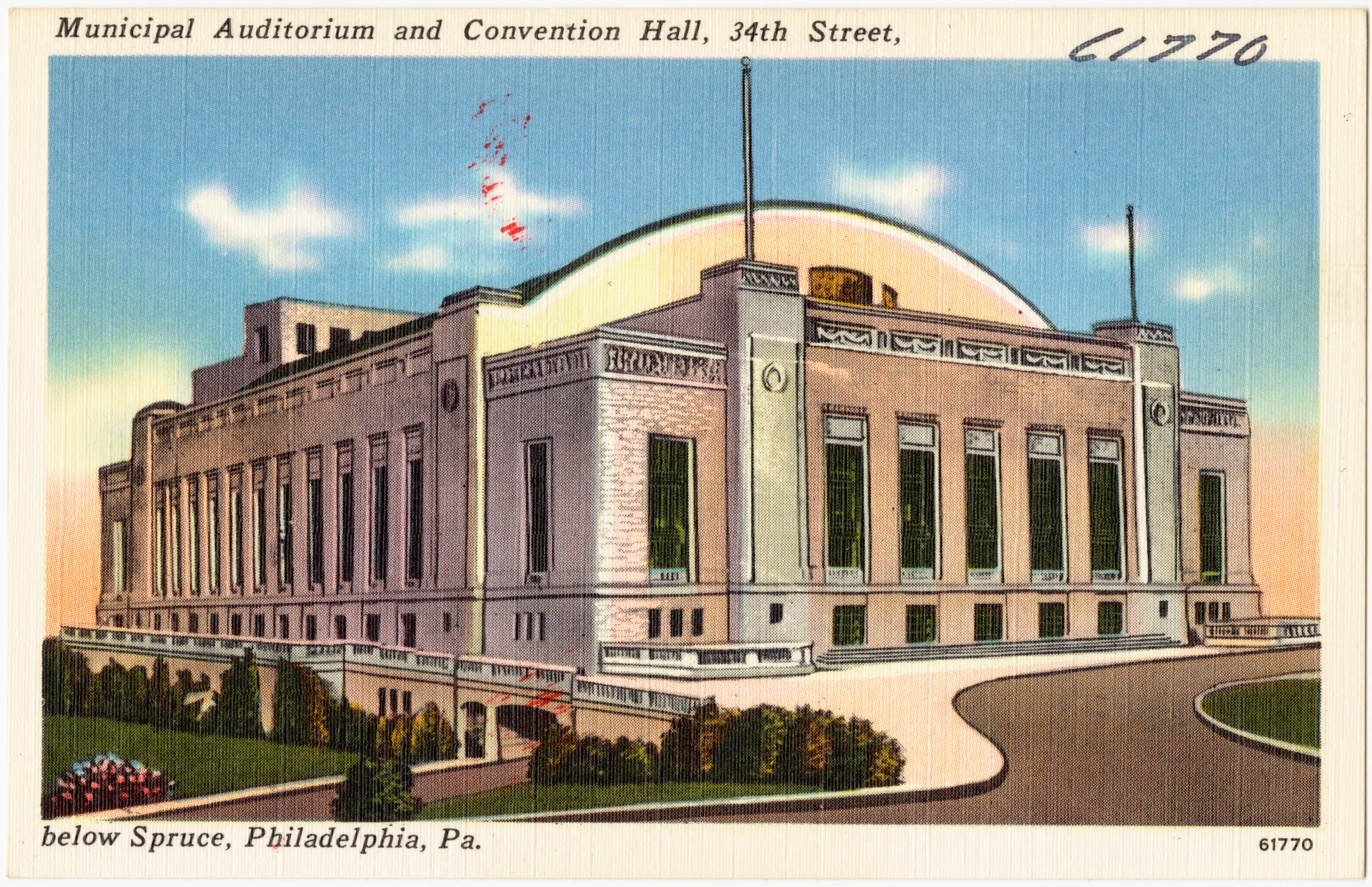
Philadelphia Convention Hall, previous home of the Philadelphia Warriors from 1952 to 1962 and home of the 76ers from 1963 to 1967

The playoff overtime loss on March 26, 1963, would be the last game for the Syracuse Nationals. Investors Irv Kosloff and Ike Richman purchased the team from Danny Biasone and moved the team to Philadelphia, filling the void left by the Warriors, who had moved to San Francisco. Syracuse was the last of the medium-sized cities with an NBA team, but by then it was apparent that central New York was no longer large enough to support it. The NBA thus returned to Philadelphia one year after the Warriors had left it. A contest was held to pick a new name for the team: "76ers", nominated by Walter Stalberg and alluding to the signing of the United States Declaration of Independence in Philadelphia in 1776. "Sixers" was also used for short, particularly in headlines. The shorter name was quickly accepted by the team for marketing purposes, and for most of the last six decades "76ers" and "Sixers" have been officially interchangeable.

For their first four years in Philadelphia, the 76ers played mostly at the Philadelphia Arena and Civic Center-Convention Hall, and occasionally at The Palestra at the University of Pennsylvania. Schayes was named head coach, a post he held for four years (the first as player-coach).

=== 1964–1968: Wilt Chamberlain era ===
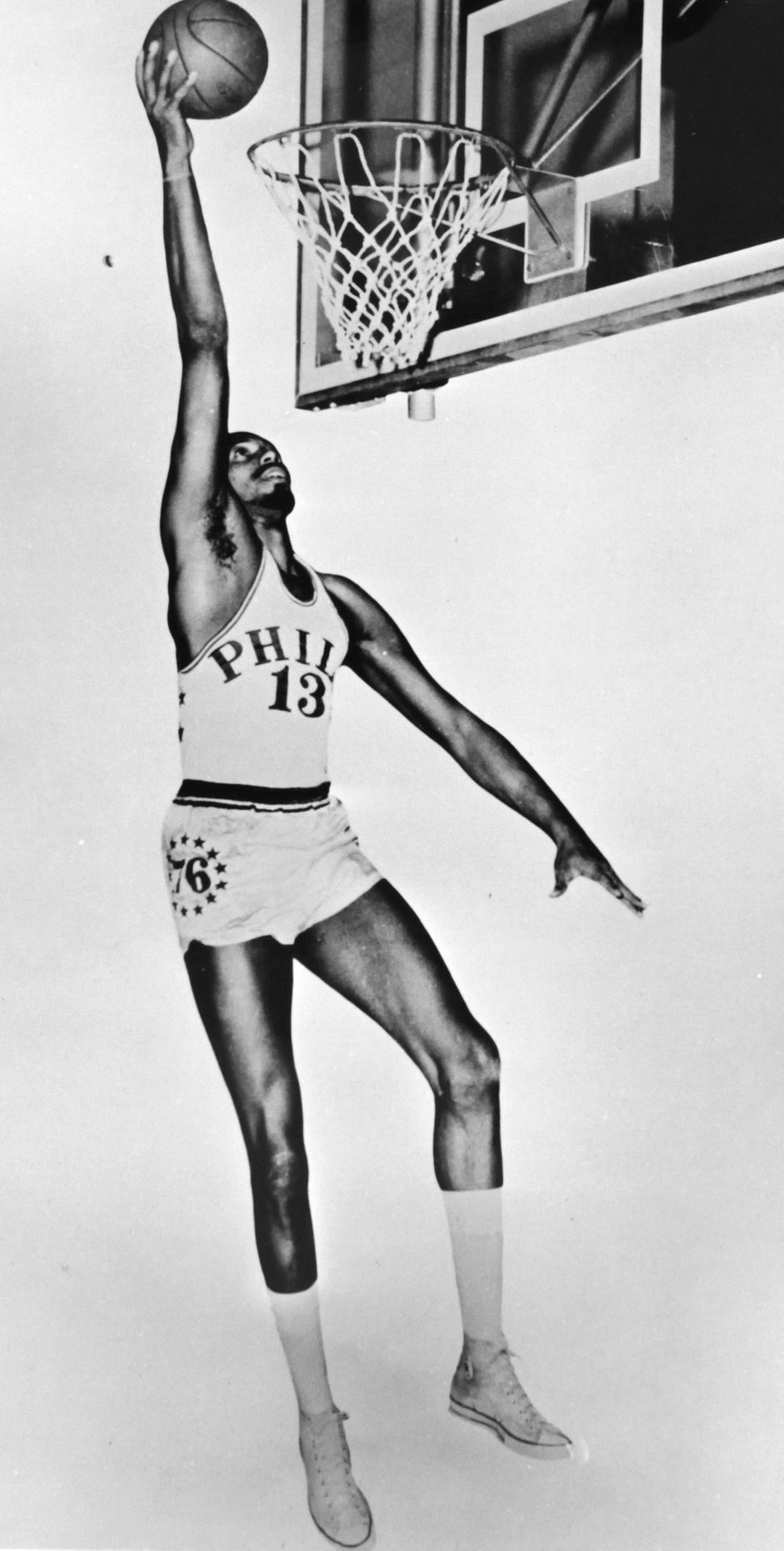
Wilt Chamberlain joined the 76ers in 1965 and led the team to the NBA title in 1967.

In the 1964–65 season, the 76ers acquired from the Warriors Wilt Chamberlain, a high school legend at Philadelphia's Overbrook High School who had begun his career with the Warriors in the city. The 76ers pushed the Celtics to seven games in the semifinals, with the 76ers trailing 110–109 in game 7. After Hal Greer's pass was stolen by John Havlicek, the Celtics beat the Los Angeles Lakers and won the NBA championship.

On December 3, 1965, during a game at the Boston Garden, co-owner Richman suffered a heart attack and died courtside.

==== 1966–1967: First title in Philadelphia ====
Led by head coach Alex Hannum, the 76ers had a dream season: starting 46–4 and finishing 68–13, the best record in league history at the time. Chamberlain, Billy Cunningham, and Greer, along with all-stars Chet Walker, Lucious Jackson, and Wali Jones led the team to the semifinals, where the 76ers beat the Celtics in five games, ending Boston's eight-year reign as NBA champions. The 1967 NBA Finals were almost anticlimactic; the 76ers beat the Warriors in six games to earn their second NBA championship. During the NBA's 35th anniversary celebration in 1980, the 1966–67 76ers would be voted the best team in league history.

==== 1967–1968: First year at the Spectrum ====
In the 1967–68 season, with a new home court at The Spectrum, the 76ers returned to the playoffs. In a rematch of the previous year's semifinals, the 76ers held a 3–1 series lead before the Celtics rallied to win in seven games.

=== 1968–1976: Fall of the 76ers ===
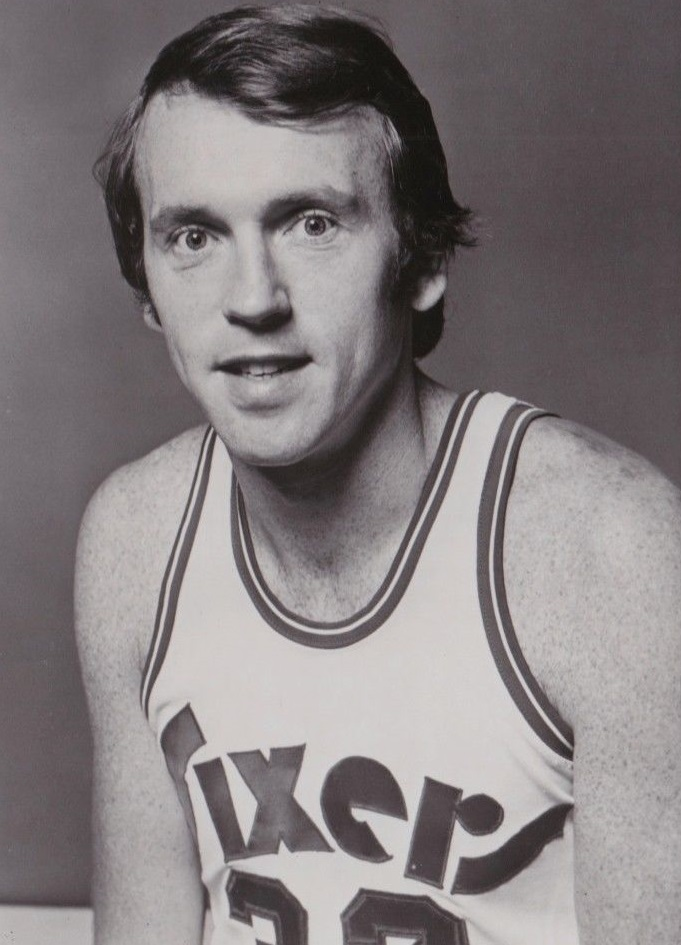
Billy Cunningham played nine seasons with the 76ers from 1965 to 1972, and later coached the team for eight seasons from 1977 to 1985.

At the end of the season, the 76ers dealt Chamberlain to the Los Angeles Lakers for Archie Clark, Darrall Imhoff, and Jerry Chambers. At the time, the trade appeared to make some sense from the 76ers' perspective. Chamberlain was talking about jumping to the American Basketball Association, and general manager Jack Ramsay did not want to risk letting Chamberlain walk away for nothing. The 76ers' performance declined, after Chamberlain's replacement at center, Lucious Jackson, suffered a severe injury in 1969 and Ramsay traded All-Star forward Chet Walker to the Chicago Bulls.

In the next three years, the 76ers never got past the second round of playoffs. In 1971–72, only five years after winning the title, the 76ers finished 30–52 and missed postseason play for the first time in franchise history.

The bottom fell out in the 1972–73 season. Ramsay left for the expansion Buffalo Braves, and the 76ers had trouble finding a replacement; Al McGuire and Adolph Rupp turned them down. Kosloff was so desperate for a replacement that he took out an ad in The Philadelphia Inquirer. It was answered by Roy Rubin, longtime head coach at Long Island University.

For all intents and purposes, the season ended when Cunningham bolted to the ABA on the same day Rubin was introduced as head coach. This left the 76ers with a roster of Greer and little else.

The 76ers lost their first 15 games of the season, and a few months later set a then-record 20-game losing streak in a single season. Their record after the 20-game losing streak was 4–58, and the team at that point had just lost 34 of 35 games. The 76ers finished the season with a 9–73 record, leading the skeptical Philadelphia press to call them the "Nine and 73-ers". Rubin was fired after 51 games and a 4–47 record; as it turned out, it would be his only NBA coaching job. He was succeeded by player-coach Kevin Loughery, who went 5–26 the rest of the way.

The 76ers finished an NBA-record 59 games behind the Atlantic Division champion Boston Celtics. Only six years after tallying the most wins in NBA history, the 1972–73 squad notched the fourth-fewest wins in NBA history, and still the fewest for a full 82-game season. The 73 losses, although threatened several times, remains the all-time low-water mark for any NBA franchise. The 76ers' 0.110 winning percentage was a record worst at the time, and would remain the lowest until the 2011–12 Charlotte Bobcats finished 7–59 for a .106 winning percentage in a season shortened due to a lockout. The 76ers of 1972–73 are generally considered to be the worst team ever to take the court in NBA history. In 2007, NBA historian Kyle Wright argued that the 1992–93 Dallas Mavericks and 1997–98 Denver Nuggets, both of whom won eleven games, plus the inaugural Cleveland Cavaliers, who won 15 games, were actually poorer teams due to much weaker schedules.

The next year, the 76ers would hire Gene Shue as their head coach and they slowly came back. In the 1975–76 season, the 76ers acquired George McGinnis from the Indiana Pacers of the ABA (after the Knicks tried to sign him, not knowing that the 76ers owned his rights). With him, the 76ers were back in the playoffs after a five-year absence, and even though they lost to the Buffalo Braves in three games, a doctor would come along and get the team healthy enough to stay in perennial contention. During this period, one last personnel misjudgment had effects when the team used the fifth pick overall in the 1975 draft to select Darryl Dawkins directly from high school. The immensely talented and physically imposing Dawkins seldom, if ever, lived up to his great potential in part because of a perpetual adolescence.

=== 1976–1987: Julius Erving era ===
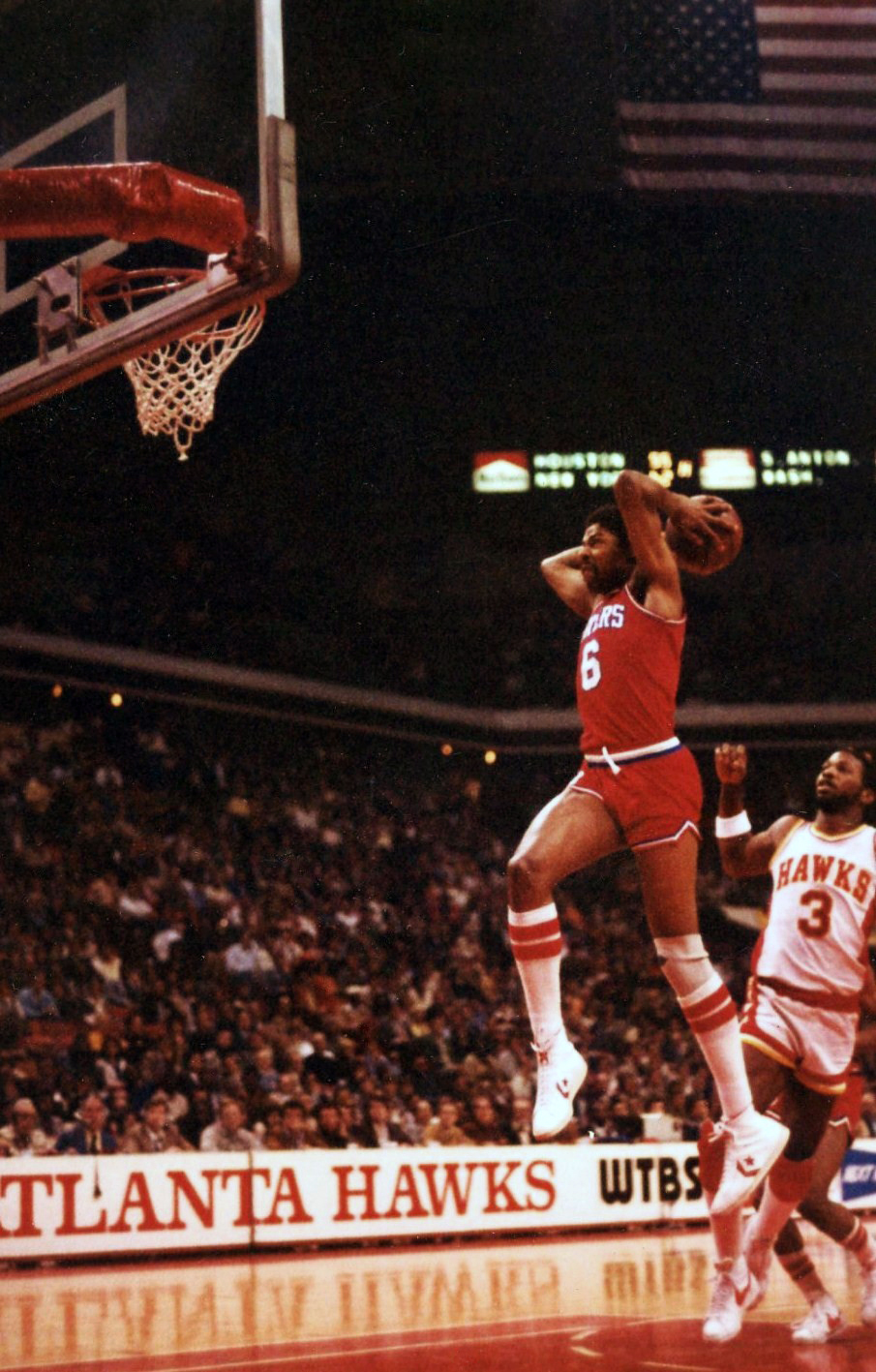
Julius Erving played 11 seasons with the 76ers from 1976 to 1987, leading the 76ers to four NBA Finals and ultimately winning an NBA championship in 1983.

The 76ers finally came all the way back in 1976–77, in large part due to the ABA–NBA merger. The ABA's last champions, the New York Nets, were facing a burden of $5 million to the Knicks for entering the New York metropolitan area on top of the $3.2 million expansion fee for joining the NBA. So, when the 76ers offered to buy the contract of the Nets' franchise player, Julius Erving, for $3 million – roughly the cost of NBA membership – the Nets had little choice but to accept. A few months before that trade, Kosloff had sold the 76ers to Fitz Eugene Dixon Jr. on May 28, 1976.

Led by Erving, the 76ers began an exciting ride, beating their long-time rival from Boston in a seven-game playoff series to advance to the Eastern Conference finals. There, they defeated the Houston Rockets, led by future 76er Moses Malone, in six games to advance to the NBA Finals. In the Finals, they sprinted to a 2–0 series lead over the Bill Walton-led Portland Trail Blazers – who were coached by former 76ers' coach/general manager Jack Ramsay – only to drop the next four games in a row to give the Blazers the title.

That led to the 1977–78 motto of "We owe you one", which would ultimately backfire when they lost in the conference finals that season to the Washington Bullets, who went on to win the NBA championship. In the next four seasons, the 76ers would fall short of the NBA championship, even after Shue handed the coaching reins to former great Billy Cunningham. In the 1980 NBA Finals against the Los Angeles Lakers, they lost 4–2. In game 6, rookie Magic Johnson played center for the Lakers in place of Kareem Abdul-Jabbar (who was out because of a sprained ankle sustained in game 5) and scored 42 points. In the 1981 conference finals, the 76ers opened a 3–1 series lead over the Celtics only to see Boston come back and win the series in seven games. The following season, the 76ers again faced the Celtics in the conference finals, and again jumped to a 3–1 series lead only to see Boston forge a 3–3 series tie. The 76ers were given little chance of winning as they faced the Celtics in game 7 at Boston Garden. This time, they played angry but inspired basketball, pulling away to a 120–106 victory and becoming the third NBA road team to win game 7 after leading the series 3–1. In the game's closing moments, the Boston Garden fans began chanting "Beat L.A., Beat L.A.", as they realized their team would lose the playoff series to a hated opponent (Philadelphia 76ers), but nonetheless openly wished that opponent good luck in the next round against a more hated opponent (the Los Angeles Lakers). The team lost the 1982 NBA Finals in six games against the Los Angeles Lakers.

==== 1982–1983: Third NBA championship ====
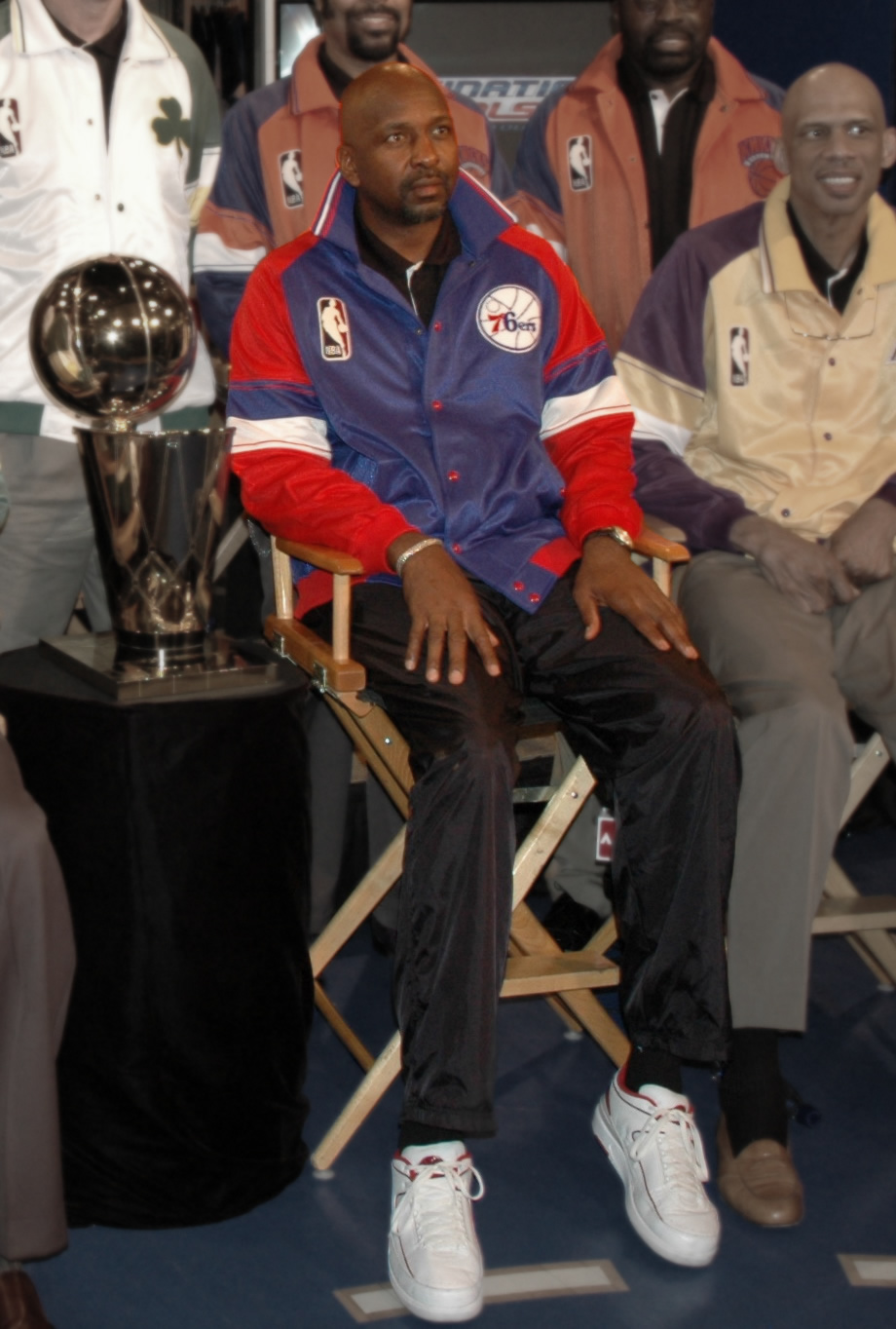
Moses Malone won MVP honors in 1983, the same year he led the 76ers to their first title in 16 years.

Harold Katz bought the 76ers from Dixon in 1981. On his watch, the final piece of the championship puzzle was completed before the 1982–83 season when they acquired center Moses Malone from the Houston Rockets. Led by Hall of Famers Julius Erving, Maurice Cheeks, and All-Stars Andrew Toney and Bobby Jones, they dominated the regular season, winning 65 games in what is still the second most winning year in franchise history. Malone was named League MVP, and when reporters asked how the playoffs would run, he answered, "four, four, four" – in other words, saying that the 76ers needed to win four games in each of the three rounds. Malone's accent made his boast sound like "fo', fo', fo'."

The 76ers backed up Malone's boast. In the Eastern Conference playoff, they first swept the New York Knicks and then beat the Milwaukee Bucks in five games. The 76ers went on to win their third NBA championship (and second in Philadelphia) with a four-game sweep of the Los Angeles Lakers, who had defeated them the season before. Malone was named the playoffs' MVP. The 76ers did not quite fulfill Malone's prediction, as their run was actually "fo', fi', fo" ("four, five, four") – a loss to the Bucks in game 4 of the conference finals being the only blemish on their playoff run. Nonetheless, their 12–1 playoff record is tied for the fewest losses in league history with the 2000–01 Lakers, who went 15–1 en route to the NBA title, coincidentally beating the 76ers in the Finals (after suffering their only defeat that postseason in game 1), and also with the 2016–2017 Golden State Warriors, who won the title with a 16–1 playoff record. The Philadelphia-based group Pieces Of A Dream had a minor hit in 1983 with the R&B song "Fo-Fi-Fo", which title was prompted by Malone's quip. This also marked the last major-pro championship in Philadelphia until the Philadelphia Phillies won the 2008 World Series.

==== Arrival of Charles Barkley ====
After a disappointing 1983–84 season, which ended with a five-game loss to the upstart New Jersey Nets in the first round of the playoffs, Charles Barkley arrived in Philadelphia for the 1984–85 season. For the next eight seasons, Barkley brought delight to the Philadelphia fans thanks to his humorous and sometimes controversial ways. The 76ers returned to the conference finals in Barkley's rookie season, but lost to the Boston Celtics in five games. As it turned out, they would never again advance as far during Barkley's tenure in Philadelphia. After the 1984–85 season, Matt Guokas replaced Billy Cunningham as head coach. Guokas led the 76ers to a 54–28 record and the second round of the 1986 playoffs, where they were defeated by the Milwaukee Bucks in seven games.

On June 16, 1986, Katz made two of the most controversial and highly criticized personnel moves in franchise history, trading Moses Malone to Washington and the first overall pick in the 1986 NBA draft, which had been obtained from the San Diego Clippers in a 1979 trade for Joe Bryant, to the Cleveland Cavaliers. In return, the 76ers received Roy Hinson, Jeff Ruland, and Cliff Robinson, none of whom played more than three seasons with the team. Cleveland, meanwhile, turned their acquired pick into future All-Star Brad Daugherty.

On the night of the 1986–87 season opener, Julius Erving announced he would retire after the season, which was subsequently filled with tributes in each arena the 76ers visited. On the court, the team suffered through an injury-plagued campaign, but still managed to make the playoffs with a 45–37 record. Their season would end at the hands of the Bucks again, this time in a best-of-five first-round series that went the distance.

=== 1987–1992: Charles Barkley era ===
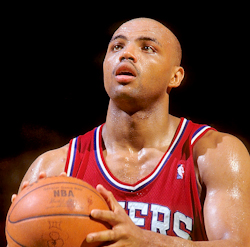
Charles Barkley played eight seasons with the 76ers from 1984 to 1992

In 1987–88, with the team's record at 20–23, Guokas was fired and replaced by assistant coach Jim Lynam. Lynam finished the season 16–23, to bring Philadelphia's overall mark to 36–46. For the first time since the 1974–75 season, the 76ers failed to reach the playoffs. Philadelphia selected Charles Smith with its first pick (third overall) in the 1988 NBA draft, then traded his rights to the Los Angeles Clippers for their first pick (sixth overall), and Hersey Hawkins. In five seasons with the 76ers, Hawkins would average 19 points per game, and was the team's all-time leader in three-point field goals attempted and made when he was traded to the Charlotte Hornets for Dana Barros, Sidney Green and draft picks in 1993.

In 1988–89, Philadelphia returned to the playoffs after a one-year absence, but was swept in the first round by the New York Knicks. In 1989–90, Barkley finished second in the league's MVP voting, as the 76ers won the Atlantic Division title with a 53–29 record. After defeating Cleveland in the first round of the playoffs, Philadelphia faced Michael Jordan and the Chicago Bulls in the second round. The 76ers fell to the Chicago Bulls in five games, and would do the same in 1991 after sweeping the Bucks in the first round. In the 1991–92 season, the 76ers went 35–47 and missed the playoffs for just the second time during Barkley's eight seasons in Philadelphia. On June 17, 1992, Barkley was traded to the Phoenix Suns for Jeff Hornacek, Tim Perry, and Andrew Lang, a deal that was met with harsh criticism.

=== 1992–1996: Dark ages ===
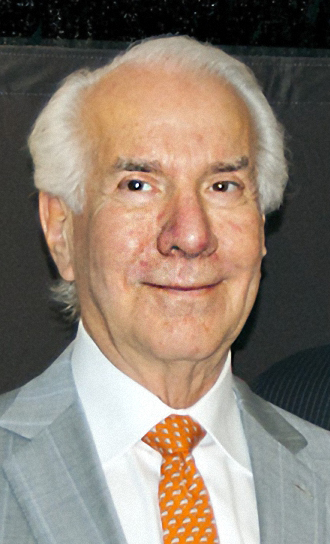
Ed Snider purchased the 76ers in 1996.

Lynam relinquished his head coaching position to become general manager after the 1991–92 season, and hired Doug Moe to fill the vacancy. Moe's tenure lasted just 56 games, with the 76ers posting a 19–37 record. Popular former player and longtime assistant coach Fred Carter succeeded Moe as head coach in March 1993, but could only manage a 32–76 record at the helm. After the 1993–94 season, the 76ers hired John Lucas in the dual role of head coach and general manager. The enthusiastic Lucas had been successful as a head coach for the San Antonio Spurs, and Philadelphia hoped he could breathe new life into the 76ers. It proved disastrous, as the team went 42–122 in its two seasons under Lucas. The acquisition of unproductive free agents such as Scott Williams and Charles Shackleford, players at the end of their careers such as LaSalle Thompson, Orlando Woolridge, and Scott Skiles along with stunningly unwise high draft picks such as Shawn Bradley and Sharone Wright were also factors in the team's decline. In fact, Wright would only play four seasons in the NBA while Temple product Eddie Jones – drafted four slots below Wright in 1994 by the Los Angeles Lakers – had 16 productive seasons as an NBA player.

Starting with the 1990–91 season, and ending with the 1995–96 season, the 76ers had the dubious distinction of seeing their win total decrease each year. The nadir was the 1995–96 season, when they finished with an 18–64 record, the second-worst in franchise history at the time. It was also the second-worst record in the league that year, ahead of only the expansion Vancouver Grizzlies but behind the Toronto Raptors, who were also in their inaugural season. That season would turn out to be their last in The Spectrum. Katz, unpopular among fans since the 1986 trades, sold the team to Comcast Spectacor, a consortium of Philadelphia Flyers owner Ed Snider and Comcast Corporation, at the end of the 1995–96 season. Snider had been the 76ers' landlord since gaining control of the Spectrum in 1971. Pat Croce, a former trainer for the Flyers and 76ers, took over as president.

Many 76ers fans call these years "The Dark Ages". After many years of misfortune, there was a bright spot. The team won the lottery for the top pick in the 1996 NBA draft. Questions remained, but with the first pick, the 76ers selected Allen Iverson, who was nicknamed "the Answer".

=== 1996–2006: Allen Iverson era ===
With new ownership, Iverson in place, and the 76ers moving into the CoreStates Center, things seemed to finally be heading in a positive direction. Croce fired Lucas as both coach and general manager. Johnny Davis was named head coach, while Brad Greenberg took over as general manager. Iverson was named Rookie of the Year, but Philadelphia's overall improvement was minimal, as they finished with a 22–60 record. Changes had to be made, and after the 1996–97 season, Davis and Greenberg were both fired and the unveiling of a new 76ers team logo and jerseys marked a new era. To replace Davis, Larry Brown was hired as head coach. Known for a defense-first approach and transforming unsuccessful teams into winners by "playing the right way", Brown faced perhaps his toughest coaching challenge. He often clashed with Iverson, but the 76ers improved to 31 wins in 1997–98. Early in the 1997–98 season, the 76ers traded Jerry Stackhouse, who had been the third overall pick in the 1995 NBA draft, to the Detroit Pistons. In exchange, Philadelphia received Aaron McKie and Theo Ratliff, defensive standouts who would have an impact in the team's resurgence. Another key figure in the team's rise, Eric Snow, was added in a trade with the Seattle SuperSonics in January 1998.

Before the 1998–99 season, the 76ers signed George Lynch and Matt Geiger, but a lockout delayed the start of the season, which was shortened to 50 games. During the season, Philadelphia acquired Tyrone Hill in a trade with Milwaukee. The team began its resurgence during this lockout-shortened season, finishing with a 28–22 record and the sixth seed in the playoffs, marking the first time since 1991 the team reached the postseason. In the first round, Philadelphia upset the Orlando Magic 3–1, before being swept by the Indiana Pacers. The following season, the 76ers improved to 49–33, fifth in the Eastern Conference. Again, the 76ers won their first-round series in four games, this time defeating the Charlotte Hornets. For the second straight year, they were defeated by Indiana in the second round, this time in six games. Though the team was moving in a positive direction, Iverson and Brown continued to clash, and their relationship deteriorated to the point where it seemed certain Iverson would be traded. A rumored trade to the Los Angeles Clippers fell through, but a complicated four-team deal that would've seen Iverson sent to Detroit was agreed upon, only to see it dissolve due to salary cap problems. When it became clear Iverson was staying in Philadelphia, he and Brown worked to patch things up, and the team would reap the benefits in 2000–01.

==== 2000–2001 season: NBA Finals loss to the Lakers ====
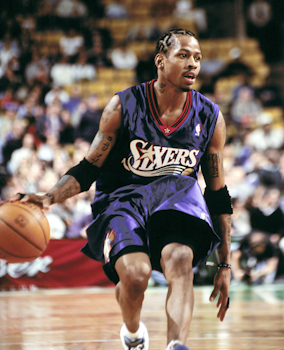
Allen Iverson won Most Valuable Player honors in 2001 while leading the 76ers to the NBA Finals.

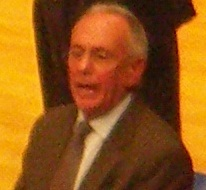
Larry Brown coached the 76ers from 1997 to 2003 and was named Coach of the Year in 2001.

During the 2000–01 season, the 76ers got off to a hot start by winning their first ten games and were never seriously challenged in the Atlantic Division. Larry Brown coached the Eastern Conference All-Stars, and Allen Iverson was named MVP of the All-Star Game. Shortly before the All-Star break, Theo Ratliff was lost for the season with a wrist injury, one that would later prove to be devastating to his future career. Despite holding a 41–14 record and a comfortable lead atop both the Atlantic Division and Eastern Conference standings at the time of the February 22 trade deadline, management felt the team needed an established center to advance deep into the playoffs. On that day, Philadelphia acquired Dikembe Mutombo from the Atlanta Hawks in a deal that sent the injured Ratliff along with Nazr Mohammed, Toni Kukoč, and Pepe Sánchez to Atlanta (Sánchez was reacquired later in the season after the Hawks waived him). The 76ers went on to finish 56–26, good enough for their first Atlantic Division title since 1989–90 and top seed in the playoffs.

In the first round of the playoffs, Philadelphia faced Indiana yet again. In game 1, the 76ers wasted an 18-point lead and lost, 79–78, when Reggie Miller hit a three-pointer in the closing seconds. Philadelphia fought back and won the next three games to win the series.

In the conference semifinals, the 76ers squared off against the Toronto Raptors and their superstar, Vince Carter. The teams alternated wins in the first four games, with Iverson scoring 54 points in Philadelphia's game 2 victory. A game 5 win with Iverson scoring 52 in a 121–88 rout, and a game 6 loss set up a decisive game 7, which the 76ers survived as Carter missed a long jump shot at the buzzer for an 88–87 victory that sent the 76ers to the conference finals against the Milwaukee Bucks.

After the teams split the first two games of the series in Philadelphia, it was learned Iverson would miss game 3 due to various nagging injuries that had plagued him late in the season. Though most predicted a Milwaukee cakewalk, the 76ers kept the game close before falling, 80–74. Philadelphia seemed to gain momentum despite the loss, and they would win Games Four and Five. Milwaukee put any 76ers' celebration plans on hold by building up a 33-point lead in the third quarter of game 6, but the 76ers would make a furious fourth-quarter rally before falling 110–100. Struggling in the series up to that point, Iverson scored 26 points in the final quarter to finish with 46 on the night and appeared to have gotten a second wind. In game 7, the Bucks jumped out to a 34–25 second-quarter advantage before seldom-used reserve Raja Bell scored 10 points to spark a 23–4 run that gave Philadelphia the lead for good. Iverson scored 44 points and the 76ers pulled away in the second half, winning by a 108–91 score to put them in the NBA Finals for the first time since 1983.

As had been the case in their three previous Finals appearances, their opponent would be the Los Angeles Lakers, who had run up an 11–0 record in the first three rounds of the playoffs and were expected by many to make quick work of a worn-down 76ers squad. Because of a seemingly meaningless loss to the lowly Chicago Bulls in the regular season finale with both the 76ers and the Lakers finishing with identical 56–26 records, though Los Angeles was awarded a higher seed based on tiebreakers, the NBA Finals marked the first time in the 2001 playoffs in which the 76ers had to start a series on the road.

In game 1, the Lakers jumped out to an 18–5 lead, but the 76ers stormed back to take a 15-point lead in the second half. Los Angeles rallied to force a 94–94 tie at the end of regulation before scoring the first five points of the overtime period, but the 76ers closed the game on a 13–2 run for a 107–101 triumph. Iverson hit a go-ahead three-pointer with 1:19 to go in the extra period, and followed that with a jump shot after which he infamously stepped over Tyronn Lue after making the basket. Eric Snow hit a running jump shot in the waning seconds with the shot clock expiring to clinch the stunning victory. The series would come back to Philadelphia even as Los Angeles took game 2, 98–89. In game 3, Shaquille O'Neal fouled out late in the fourth quarter, and the 76ers pulled to within a point with less than a minute to play after trailing by 12 earlier in the second half. Robert Horry hit a clutch three-pointer in that final minute, and the Lakers prevailed, 96–91. Los Angeles wrapped up the second of what would be three consecutive NBA titles with a 100–86 win in game 4 and a 108–96 victory in game 5.

In addition to their Atlantic Division and Eastern Conference titles, the 2000–01 76ers featured the NBA's MVP (Iverson), Coach of the Year (Brown), Defensive Player of the Year (Mutombo), and Sixth Man of the Year (Aaron McKie).

==== Departure of Larry Brown ====
The 76ers went into the 2001–02 season with high expectations, but were able to produce only a 43–39 record, sixth in the Eastern Conference. In the first round of the playoffs, Philadelphia was defeated 3–2 by the Boston Celtics. In the 2002–03 season, the 76ers sprinted to a 15–4 start, but a 10–20 swoon left them 25–24 at the All-Star break. After the break, the 76ers caught fire, winning nine in a row at one point, and 23 of their last 33 to finish at 48–34, earning the fourth seed in the playoffs. Iverson scored 55 points in the playoff opener against the New Orleans Hornets and the 76ers went on to win the series in six games. In the second round, the Detroit Pistons ended Philadelphia's playoff run in a frustrating six-game series that saw the 76ers lose twice in overtime, and once on a last-second shot in regulation. It would be nine years before the 76ers won another playoff series.

On Memorial Day, 2003, Brown abruptly resigned as head coach, taking over the reins in Detroit a few days later. Brown's Pistons would win the 2004 NBA championship over the Los Angeles Lakers, in some ways avenging his loss to them in 2001. After being turned down by Jeff Van Gundy and Eddie Jordan, the 76ers hired Randy Ayers, an assistant coach under Brown, as their new head coach. Ayers lasted only 52 games and was fired with the team's record at 21–31. Chris Ford took over, but the 76ers finished the 2003–04 season at 33–49, missing the playoffs for the first time in six years. Iverson, who was at odds with Ford throughout the interim coach's tenure, played only 48 games in a stormy, injury-plagued season.

==== Arrival of Andre Iguodala ====
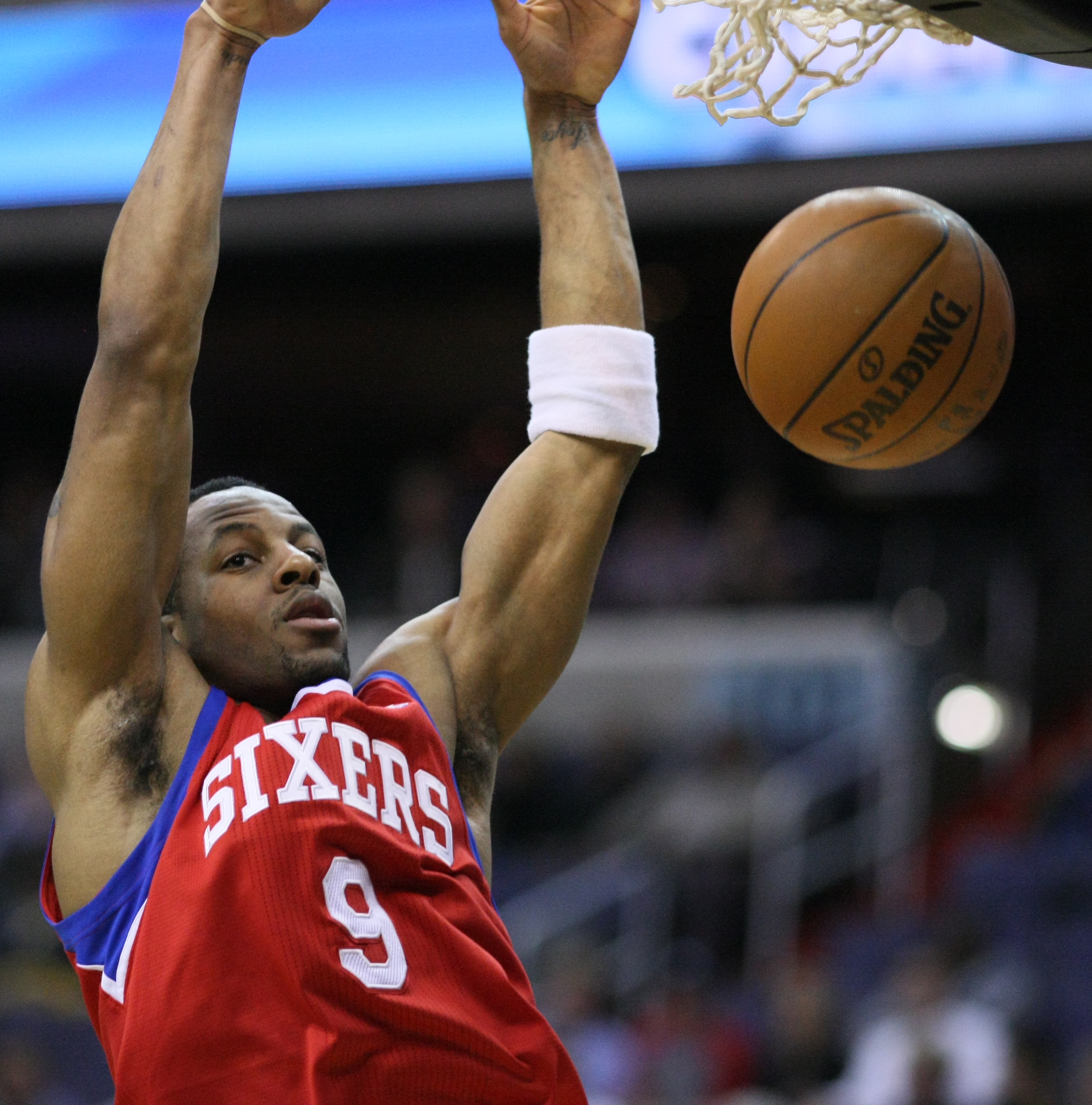
Andre Iguodala played with the 76ers from 2004 to 2012

For the 2004–05 season, Philadelphia native Jim O'Brien was named head coach. Iverson was moved back to point guard and flourished, having arguably his finest season. He also impressed many with his willingness to get other players involved in the offense. During this season, Philadelphia acquired Chris Webber in a trade with the Sacramento Kings, with the hopes that the team had at long last found a consistent second scoring option to complement Iverson. Andre Iguodala, Philadelphia's first-round pick in the 2004 NBA draft, was named to the All-Rookie First Team, and the 76ers returned to the postseason with a 43–39 record. In the first round, they were defeated in five games by the defending NBA Champion Pistons, coached by Larry Brown.

Though in the 2004–05 season the 76ers exceeded many on-court expectations, there was a great deal of behind-the-scenes tension between O'Brien, his players, and the front office. Shortly after the season ended, O'Brien was fired and replaced by the popular Maurice Cheeks, who played for the team from 1978 to 1989, and was the starting point guard for the 1983 NBA Champions. The coaching change did not help the team's fortunes for the 2005–06 season. A 2–10 stretch in March doomed them to missing the playoffs for the second time in three years with a 38–44 record.

With the opening of the 2006–07 season, the 76ers started out hot, going 3–0 for the first time since making it to the NBA Finals five years previously. They stumbled through the first half of the season and did not recover, finishing 35–47, good for third in the Atlantic Division, and ninth in the Eastern Conference (tied with Indiana).

On December 5, 2006, disappointed with the direction the team was headed, Allen Iverson gave the 76ers management an ultimatum: find players who will help support me or trade me. This was confirmed via an in-game interview with team owner, Ed Snider.

=== 2006–2016: Post-Iverson era ===
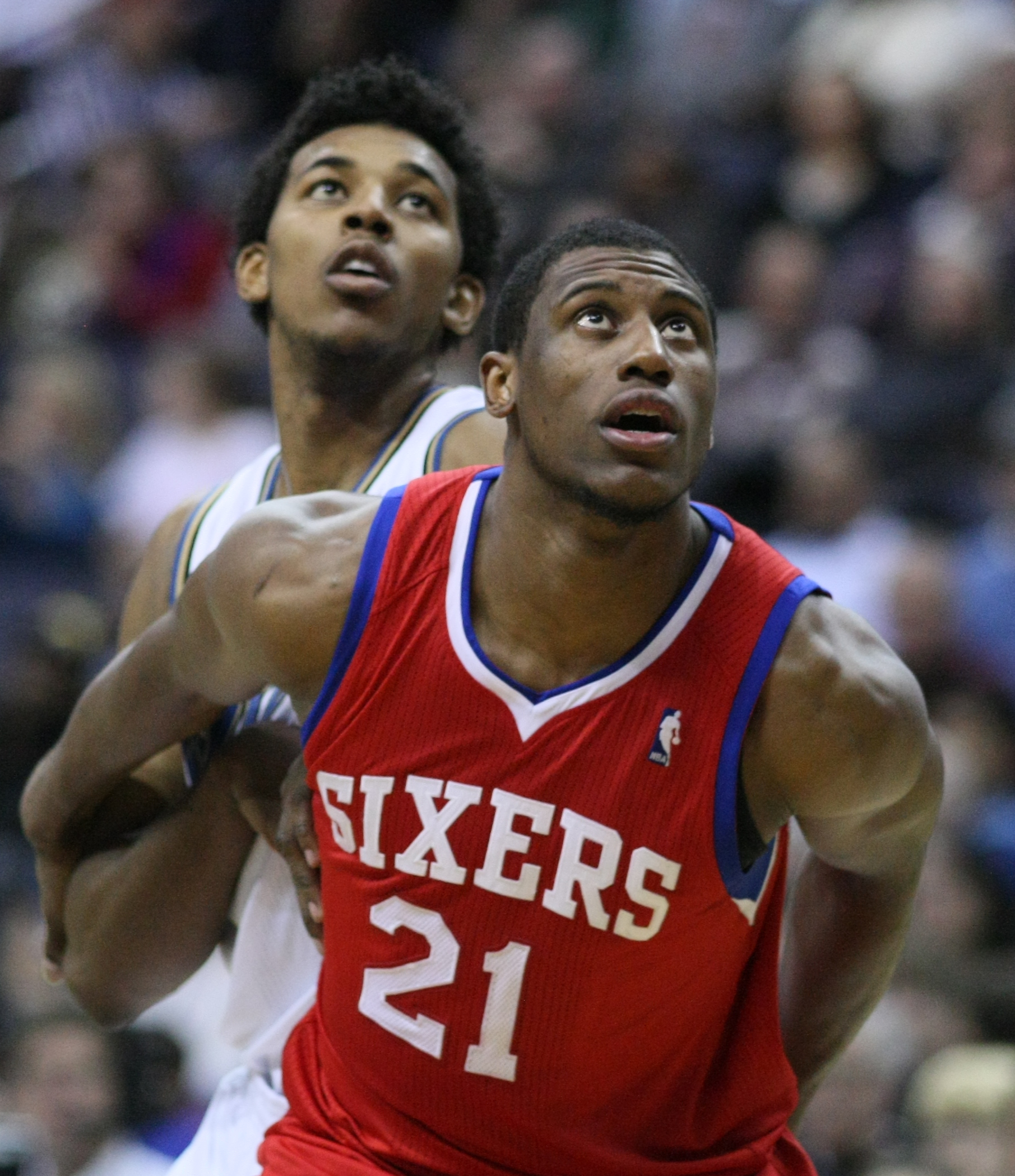
Thaddeus Young, the 76ers' first draft pick in the post-Allen Iverson era

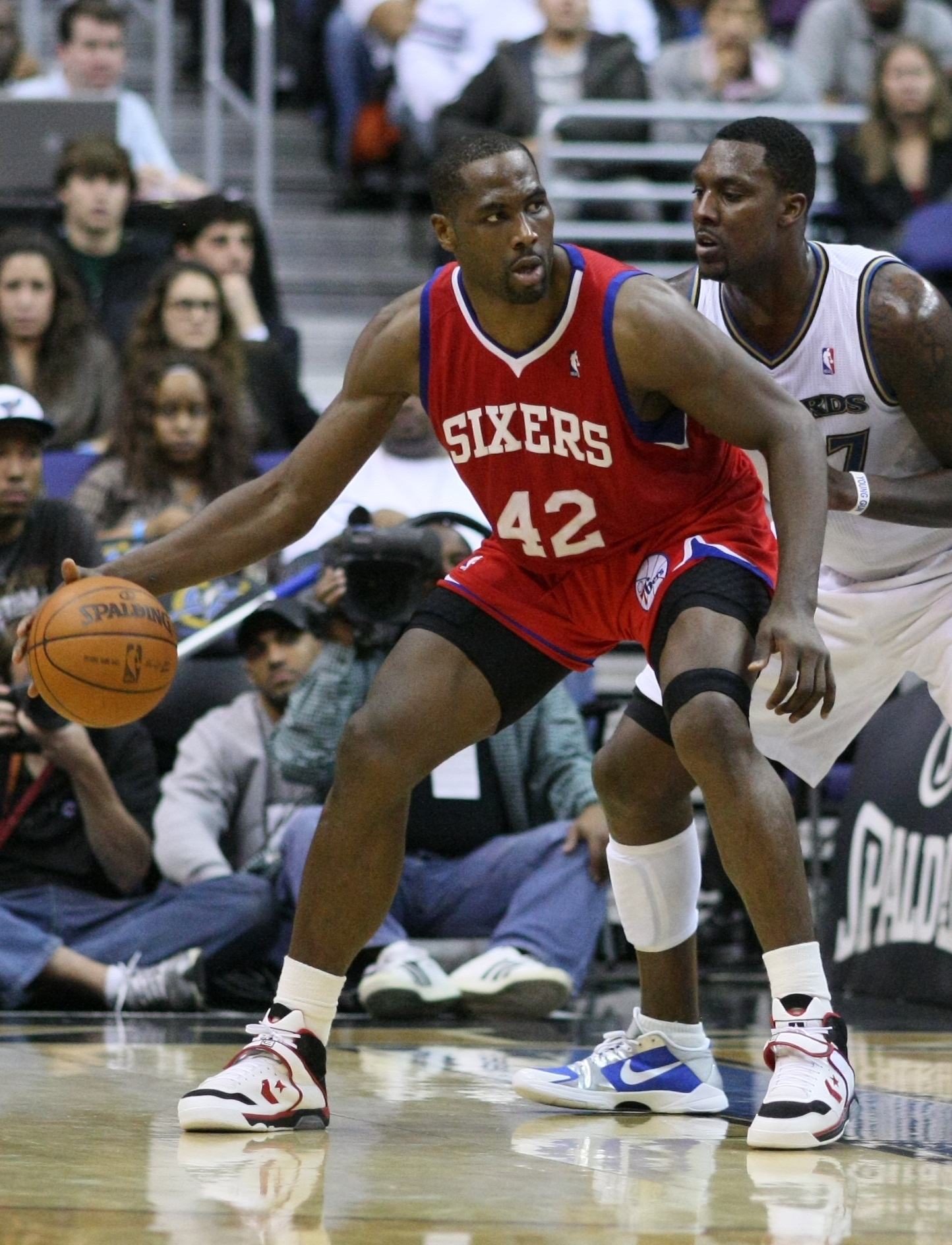
Elton Brand, who signed for five years with the 76ers in 2008

On December 19, 2006, the 76ers traded franchise player Allen Iverson, along with Ivan McFarlin, to the Denver Nuggets in exchange for Andre Miller, Joe Smith, and two first-round draft picks, marking the end of the Iverson era in Philadelphia. Shortly afterward, the team reached a contract buyout agreement with veteran forward Chris Webber, signaling the beginning of a rebuilding period centered around Andre Iguodala. The 76ers finished the 2006–07 season with a 35–47 record.

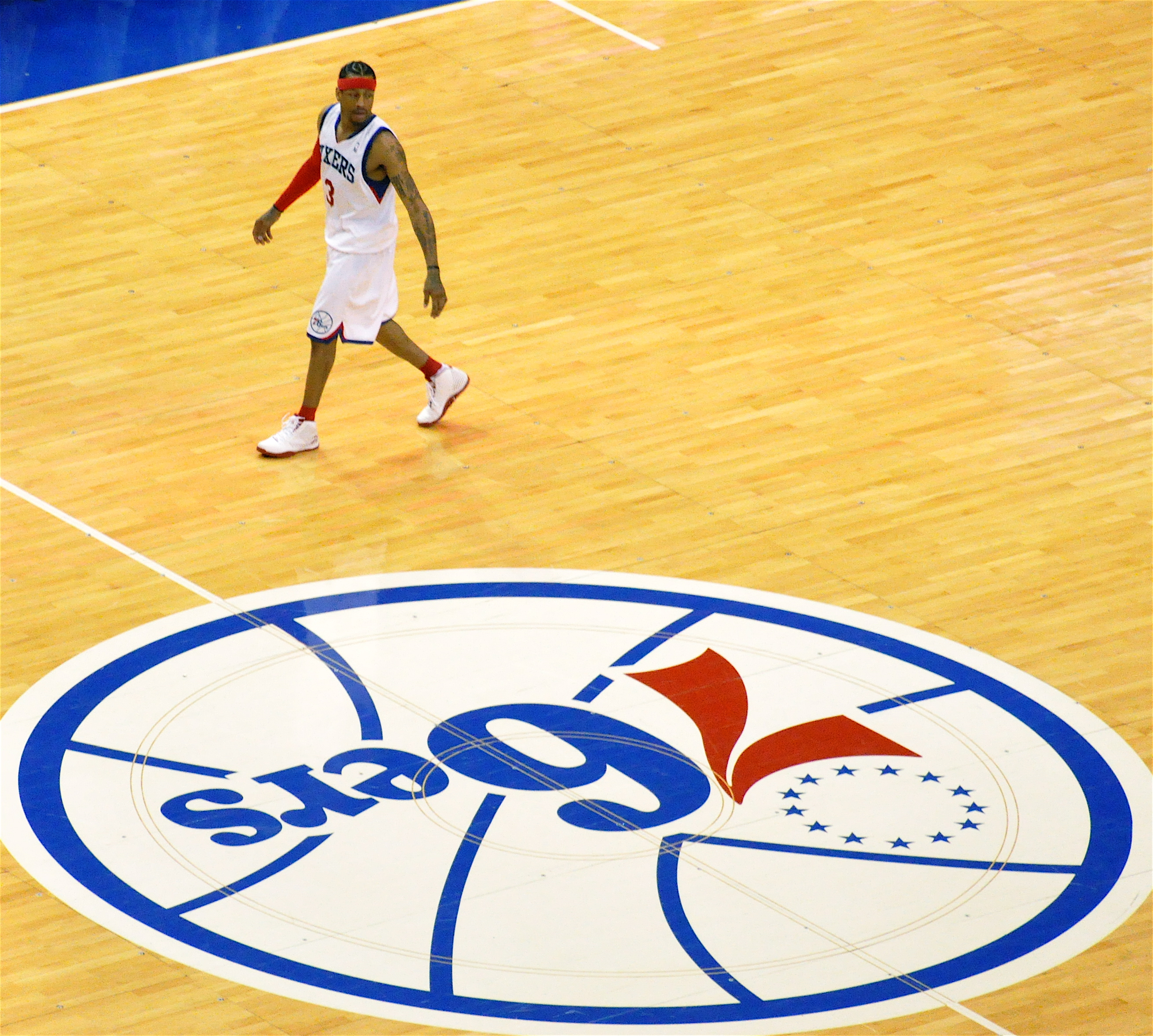
Allen Iverson returned to Philadelphia for part of the 2009–10 season.

In the 2007 NBA draft, the 76ers selected forward Thaddeus Young with the 12th overall pick. On December 4, 2007, the team fired general manager Billy King and hired former New Jersey Nets executive Ed Stefanski. Led by Iguodala and Miller, the 76ers clinched a playoff berth during the 2007–08 season, their first postseason appearance since 2005 and first since Iverson's departure. Philadelphia finished 40–42 after recovering from being 12 games under .500 earlier in the season, but lost to the Detroit Pistons in six games during the first round of the playoffs. During the 2008 off-season, the 76ers signed All-Star forward Elton Brand to a five-year contract in an attempt to transition from rebuilding into contention. The team also re-signed Iguodala and Lou Williams. After a 9–14 start during the 2008–09 season, head coach Maurice Cheeks was fired and replaced on an interim basis by assistant coach Tony DiLeo. Despite losing Brand to a season-ending shoulder injury, the 76ers finished 41–41 and qualified for the playoffs for the second consecutive season. Philadelphia took a 2–1 series lead against the Orlando Magic in the first round before losing the series in six games. The 76ers hired former Washington Wizards coach Eddie Jordan before the 2009–10 season and selected Jrue Holiday with the 17th overall pick in the 2009 NBA draft. The franchise also reintroduced a modified version of its classic 1977–97 logo and uniforms.

==== Iverson's brief return ====
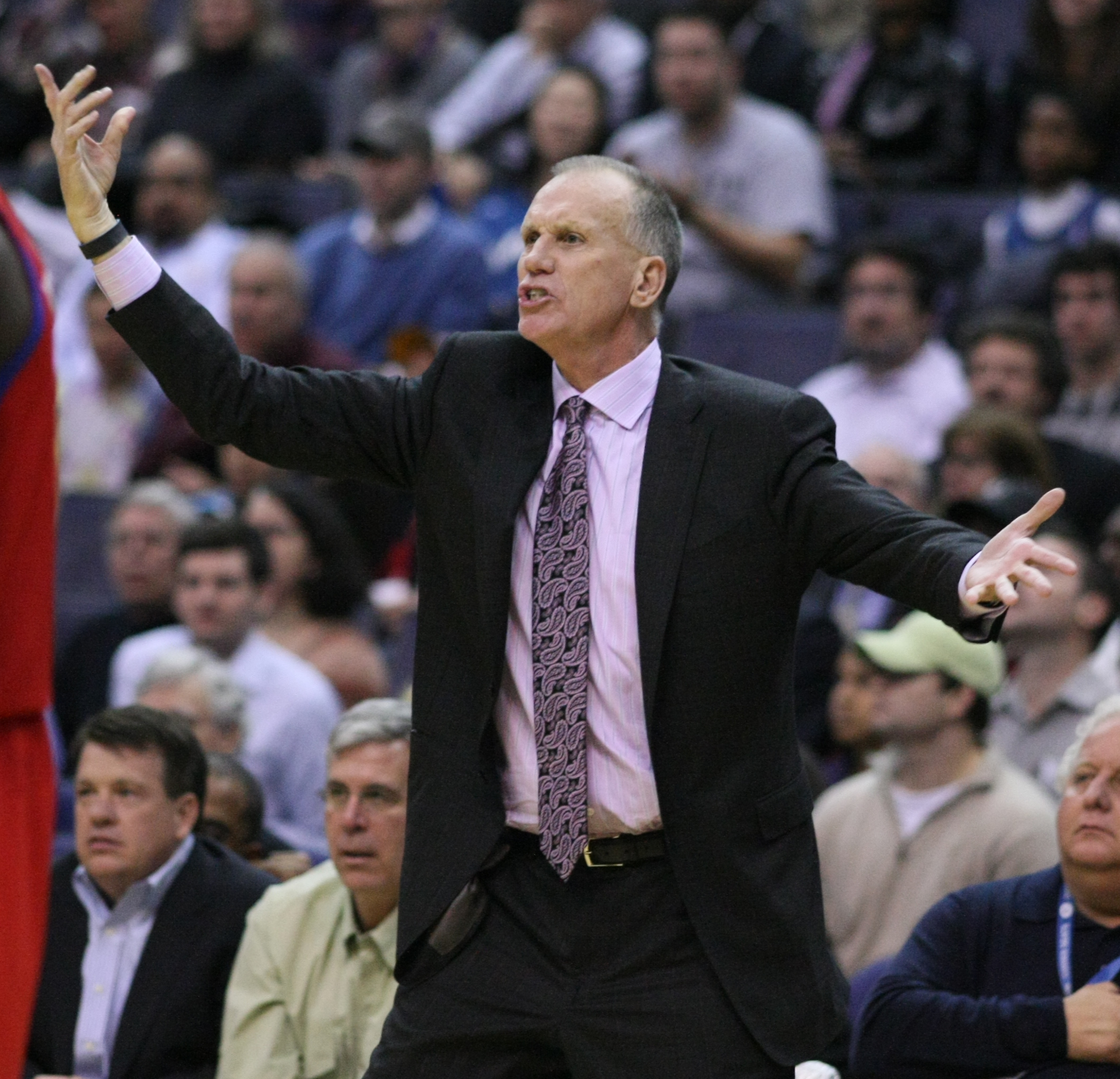
Doug Collins, who played for the team from 1973 to 1981, was hired as the 76ers' head coach in 2010.

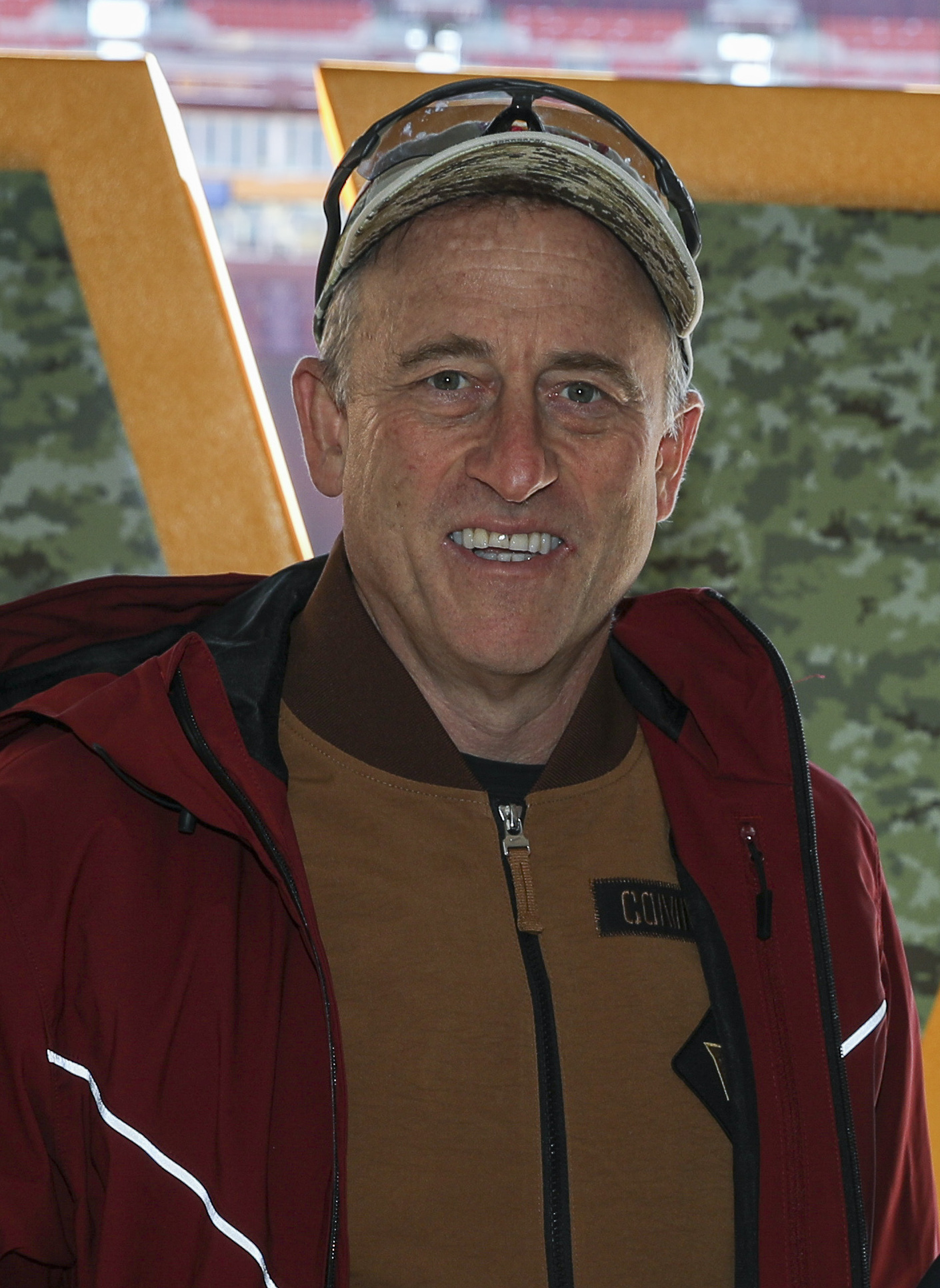
In 2011, Apollo Global Management co-founder Josh Harris led an investment group that purchased the team for $280 million.

On December 2, 2009, the Philadelphia 76ers announced that they had signed Iverson to a one-year prorated $1.3 million non-guaranteed contract. The 76ers were 5–13 at the time and had lost Williams for at least 30 games to injury. Iverson made his "re-debut" for the 76ers against the team he was traded to, the Denver Nuggets, to a thunderous ovation from the sell-out crowd, scoring 11 points, with six assists and five rebounds. The euphoria that greeted Iverson's return to the 76ers faded quickly. On February 22, Iverson announced he was leaving the 76ers indefinitely to attend to his daughter's illness, and a few weeks later the 76ers announced that Iverson would not return for the rest of the season. The 76ers finished the season with a record of 27–55, their first 50-loss season since 1998. Most cited the reason behind this as the players' inability to play within Eddie Jordan's Princeton offense, with several players unhappy with his system. Hours after the 76ers' last game at Orlando on April 14, the team fired Jordan after one season. He was the fourth coach to be fired after one season or less since Larry Brown left the team in 2003.

On May 20, 2010, TNT analyst Doug Collins was named head coach of the 76ers. Collins played for the 76ers for his entire NBA career after being the first overall pick in the 1973 draft, and had previously coached the Chicago Bulls, Detroit Pistons, and the Washington Wizards. The 76ers had the sixth-best odds at receiving the top pick in the 2010 draft, and they managed to land the second overall pick, beating out the Warriors, Kings, Timberwolves, and Nets, who all had better odds. They used that draft pick to select Ohio State University's Evan Turner.

The 76ers started the season with an uninspiring 3–13 mark, but started turning things around, to finish with a 41–41 record. They clinched a playoff berth on April 1, 2011, their third in the last four years. The 76ers faced the heavily favored Heat in the first round, and ultimately fell to them in five games. Although they lost the series, Collins was praised for turning around a lottery team in his first season, as well as winning a playoff game when many pundits predicted that the 76ers would be swept. Collins also finished second in Coach of the Year voting.

On July 13, 2011, Comcast-Spectacor reached an agreement to sell the 76ers to an investment group led by Apollo Global Management co-founder Josh Harris for $280 million. Other members of the group included David Blitzer, Art Wrubel, Jason Levien, Adam Aron, Martin Geller, David Heller, James Lassiter, Marc Leder, Michael Rubin, Will Smith, Jada Pinkett Smith, and Erick Thohir. Harris decided to retain head coach Doug Collins and president of basketball operations Rod Thorn but fired Ed Stefanski, who served as general manager since 2007.

For the season, the 76ers had their best start since 2000–01 with a 20–9 record, battling for the Eastern Conference's best record and taking a firm division lead. They finished the rest of the season 15–22, giving them a 35–31 record. Attributed to their lack of offense, the 76ers lost hold of the top-three seed and division championship that they held for most of the season, by going on the losing streak. Nevertheless, they clinched their fourth playoff berth in the last five years on the penultimate play date of the season.

Philadelphia earned the eighth seed in the 2012 NBA playoffs, facing the first-seeded Bulls. Philadelphia improved from their struggles in the second half of the regular season, beating Chicago 4–2 to win their first series since 2003. This was the fifth time in NBA history that an eight seed has beaten a one seed. They then faced their rival, the Boston Celtics, in the second round, and were eliminated 4–3. The 76ers again faced criticism for their lack of a true scorer, as they were not able to keep pace with the Celtics' scoring.

In an effort to re-tool for the upcoming season, The 76ers selected Maurice Harkless, and Arnett Moultrie (via trade with Miami) in the 2012 NBA draft. The 76ers then used their amnesty clause on Brand, traded for Dorell Wright, signed Nick Young, Kwame Brown, and Ivey, and re-signed Spencer Hawes, while Lavoy Allen, Williams, and Jodie Meeks left through free agency. On August 9, 2012, the 76ers agreed to a four-team trade with the Los Angeles Lakers, the Magic, and the Nuggets. In the trade that sent six-time All-Star Dwight Howard to the Lakers, Philadelphia agreed to send 2011 first-round pick Nikola Vučević, 2012 first-round draft pick Harkless, and a future first-round draft pick to Orlando, as well as All-Star swingman Iguodala to Denver. In exchange, they received Jason Richardson from the Magic and All-Star center Andrew Bynum from the Los Angeles Lakers.

The 76ers started the 2012–13 season with high expectations with the help of Bynum and the growth of the young 76ers. Bynum's debut with the 76ers took a hit when he was sidelined for precautionary reasons, in relation to the Orthokine knee procedure he received during the off-season. At first it looked like Bynum would be out only shortly, but little success in healing and setbacks pushed Bynum's return date further and further. As a result of many setbacks, on March 19, the 76ers announced that Bynum would have season-ending surgery on both knees. Bynum was not the only team's player to suffer through injuries. On February 8, Richardson also went through a season-ending knee surgery. Holiday, Thaddeus Young, Nick Young, and Ivey also had injuries that sidelined them for weeks. By the end of the season, Turner and Hawes were the only 76ers to play in every game during the season. The 76ers started the season 12–9 but stumbled through a tough stretch and could not recover. The 76ers finished the season 34–48, missing the playoffs for the first time since Collins had taken over as head coach.

On April 18, Collins resigned as 76ers coach, citing his declining health and need to spend time with his grandchildren. He stayed with the team as an adviser. Soon after, general manager DiLeo had "cut ties" with the team. On May 11, it was announced that Sam Hinkie, who had previously worked for the Houston Rockets, would replace DiLeo as general manager. On July 8, it was announced that Adam Aron had stepped down as CEO and was being replaced by Scott O'Neil.

==== 2013–2016: "The Process" ====
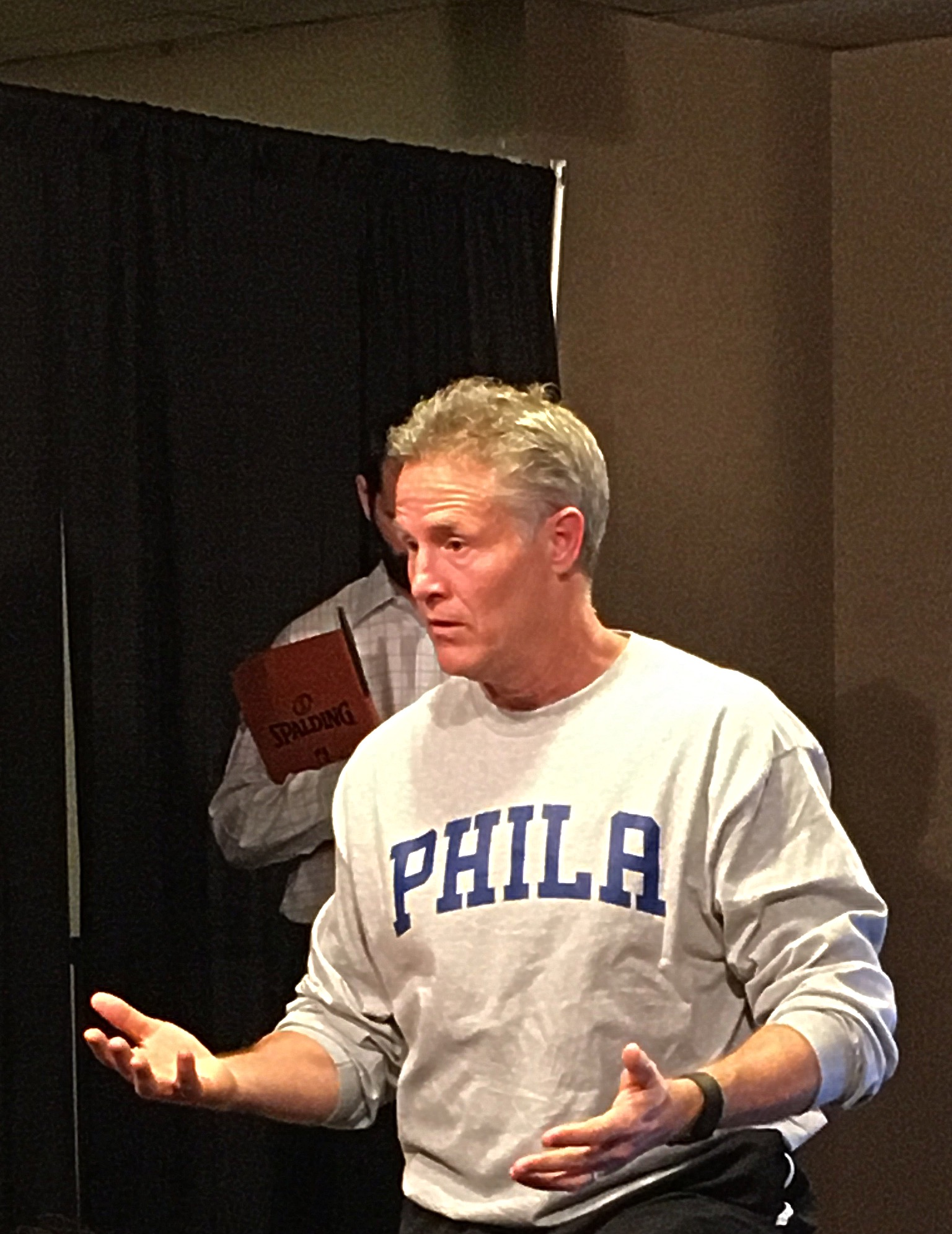
Brett Brown, who coached the team from 2013 to 2020, in 2015

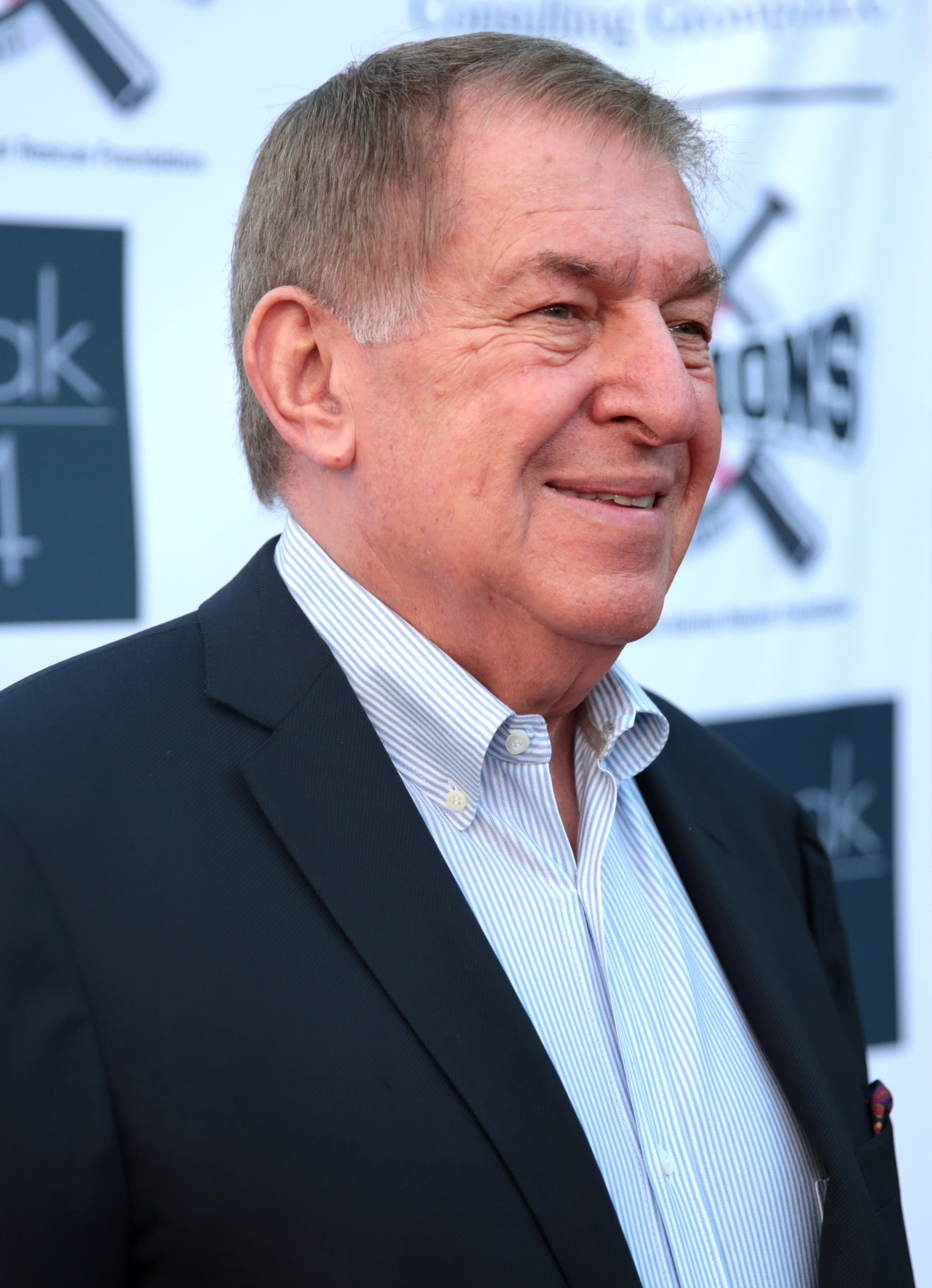
Jerry Colangelo joined the team's front office in 2015.

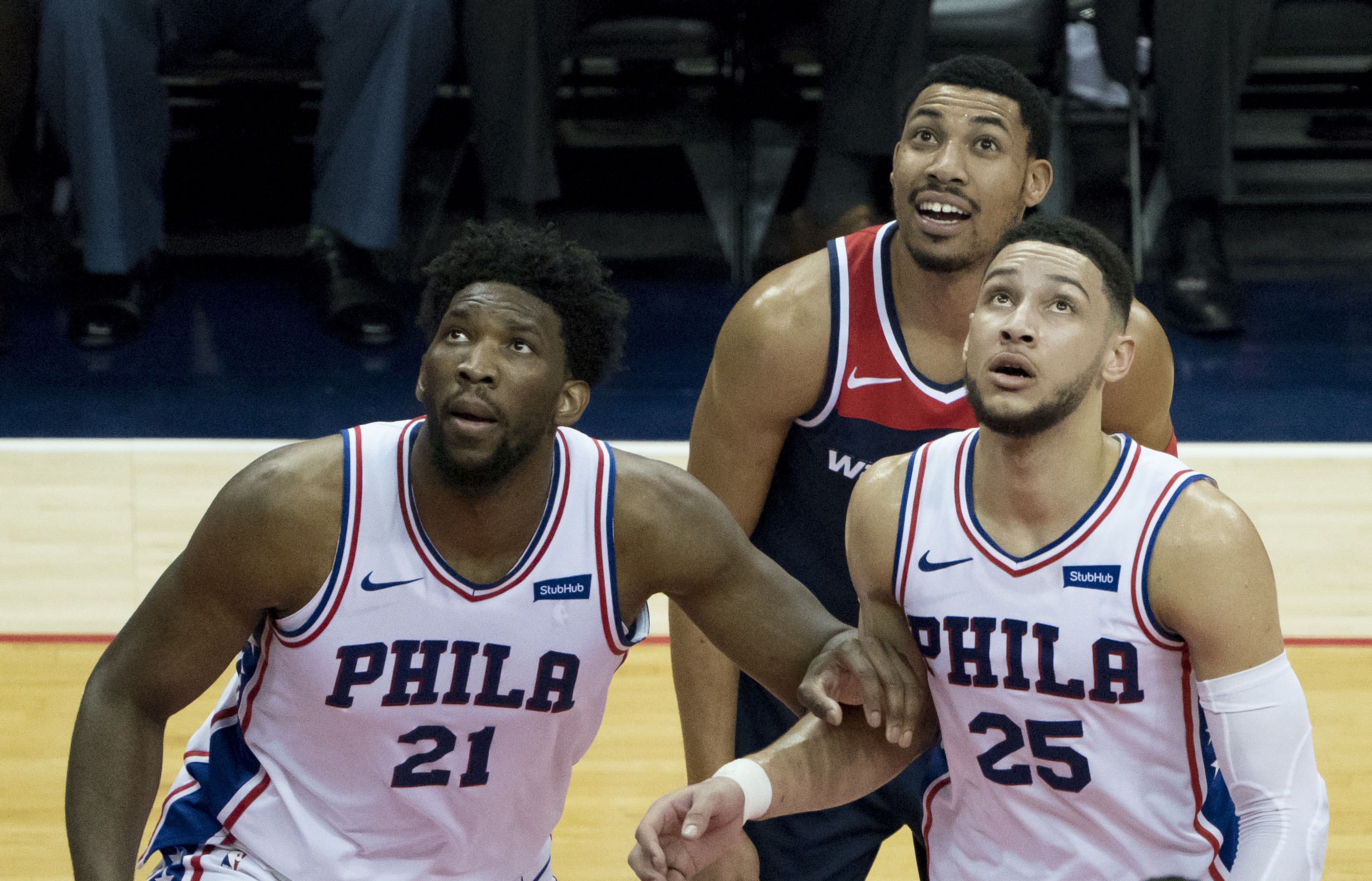
Joel Embiid and Ben Simmons were considered to be centerpieces of the 76ers' future.

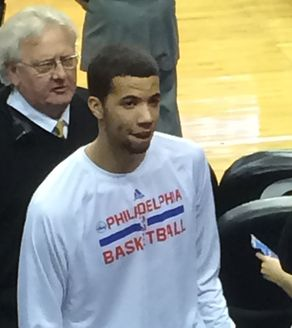
Michael Carter-Williams won Rookie Of The Year in 2014 after being drafted 11th overall by the 76ers.

After the 2012–13 season, the 76ers, led by Hinkie, chose to rebuild the franchise. Tony Wroten, guard for the 76ers, referred to the rebuilding as "The Process". The first move of this new plan was executed during the 2013 draft, when the 76ers agreed in principle to trade All-Star Jrue Holiday and the 42nd pick in the draft, Pierre Jackson, to the New Orleans Pelicans for Nerlens Noel and the Pelicans' 2014 first-round pick. The trade was later made official on July 12. The trade was seen by some as somewhat surprising, as Holiday had been the team's marquee player and was coming off a season in which he made his first NBA All-Star Game. Noel was recovering from an anterior cruciate ligament injury suffered while in college, strongly indicating that he would be inactive to start the season. The 76ers used the 11th pick in the draft to select Michael Carter-Williams as Holiday's replacement as the starting point guard. The 76ers chose Arsalan Kazemi with the 54th overall pick, making Kazemi the first Iranian chosen in the NBA draft.

After the Holiday trade, many of the team's returning players were either waived or left the team in free agency, most notably Andrew Bynum; of the 15 players on the team's roster during their final game of the 2012–13 season, only six remained with the team by January 1, 2014. In their place were a number of young prospects, many coming from the NBA Development League or signing with the 76ers after playing limited roles on other teams. Further moves at the trade deadline on February 20, 2014, saw the exits of veterans Spencer Hawes, Evan Turner, and Lavoy Allen, all of whom were key rotational players.

The 76ers began 3–0 with wins over the two-time defending champion Miami Heat and a Chicago Bulls team with high expectations. The 76ers struggled after that, at one point posting a 26-game losing streak that set a franchise record and tied the all-time NBA record for most consecutive losses in a single-season. During the middle of the season, former Orlando Magic head coach Stan Van Gundy called the 76ers "embarrassing" and said, "if you're putting that roster on the floor, you're doing everything you can possibly do to try to lose." The 76ers finished the season with a 19–63 record, the third-worst in franchise history. Still, the 2013–14 Milwaukee Bucks finished worse with a 15–67 record.

Carter-Williams led NBA rookies in points, rebounds, assists, and steals, joining Magic Johnson and Oscar Robertson as the only rookies to accomplish this feat. He also won the player of the week award in his first week, the second rookie after Shaquille O'Neal to do so. He went on to win the Rookie of the Year award, becoming the first rookie drafted 10th or later to win the award since Mark Jackson in 1987 for the New York Knicks.

In the 2014 NBA draft, the 76ers selected Joel Embiid with the third overall pick and traded with the Orlando Magic for Croatian prospect Dario Šarić, the twelfth pick of the draft. Neither prospect was expected to make an immediate impact for the 76ers, as Embiid was recovering from a stress fracture in the navicular bone, while Šarić would likely spend one or more years playing in the Turkish Basketball League. In the second round, the 76ers selected K. J. McDaniels, Jerami Grant, Jordan McRae, and Serbian prospect Vasilije Micić. The 76ers also traded a second-round pick to re-acquire Jackson from the Pelicans.

In the 2014 off-season, the team traded Thaddeus Young to Minnesota in the Kevin Love to Cleveland trade, and received the Heat's 2015 first-round draft pick, Luc Mbah a Moute and Alexey Shved, leaving only two players with three years of experience remaining on the team.

On November 29, 2014, the 76ers lost to the Dallas Mavericks 103–110 and set a franchise record for losses to start the season, as they fell to a record of 0–16. After losing their next game against the San Antonio Spurs to make it 0–17, the 76ers were on the verge of tying the NBA record of 18 straight losses to start a season if they lost to the Minnesota Timberwolves on December 3, but they broke their losing streak and won their first game of the 2014–15 season with an 85–77 victory at Minnesota.

A new training complex was opened in Camden, New Jersey, in September 2016. In three deals at the 2015 NBA trade deadline, the 76ers traded Carter-Williams and McDaniels for JaVale McGee, Isaiah Canaan, and three draft picks, including a protected 2015 first-round pick originally owned by the Los Angeles Lakers. The 76ers finished the season with an 18–64 record, tied with the second-worst in franchise history since 1995–96. Despite that, the team did not have the worst win–loss record in the overall NBA standings as the Timberwolves fared worse with a 16–66 record and Knicks fared second with 17–65 record.

On May 19, the 76ers were awarded the third overall pick in the 2015 NBA draft, where they selected Duke center Jahlil Okafor with the third overall pick. The 76ers also signed JP Tokoto with the 58th overall pick. On November 27, the 76ers lost to the Houston Rockets 116–114, giving them a 27-game losing streak dating back to the previous season, which became the longest losing streak in professional sports. During the same game, the 76ers set a franchise record of 16 three pointers made during the losing effort. On December 1, the 76ers beat the Lakers at home by a score of 103–91, but not before setting a league record of 28 consecutive losses dating to the 2014–15 season. In doing so, the 76ers also managed to avoid setting a new NBA record of most losses to begin a season. They instead tied the old record of 18 losses set by the then-New Jersey Nets in the 2009–10 season.

On December 8, the 76ers announced that they would hire Jerry Colangelo, chairman of the board of directors for USA Basketball, as the Special Advisor to the Managing General Partner and Chairman of Basketball Operations. In the first move the team made after hiring Colangelo, they traded two second-round draft picks to the Pelicans in return for point guard Ish Smith. On March 1, 2016, the 76ers, at the time with a record of 8–51, missed the playoffs for the fourth straight season. The 76ers finished the season 10–72.

=== 2016–present: The Joel Embiid era ===
==== 2016–2017: First year ====
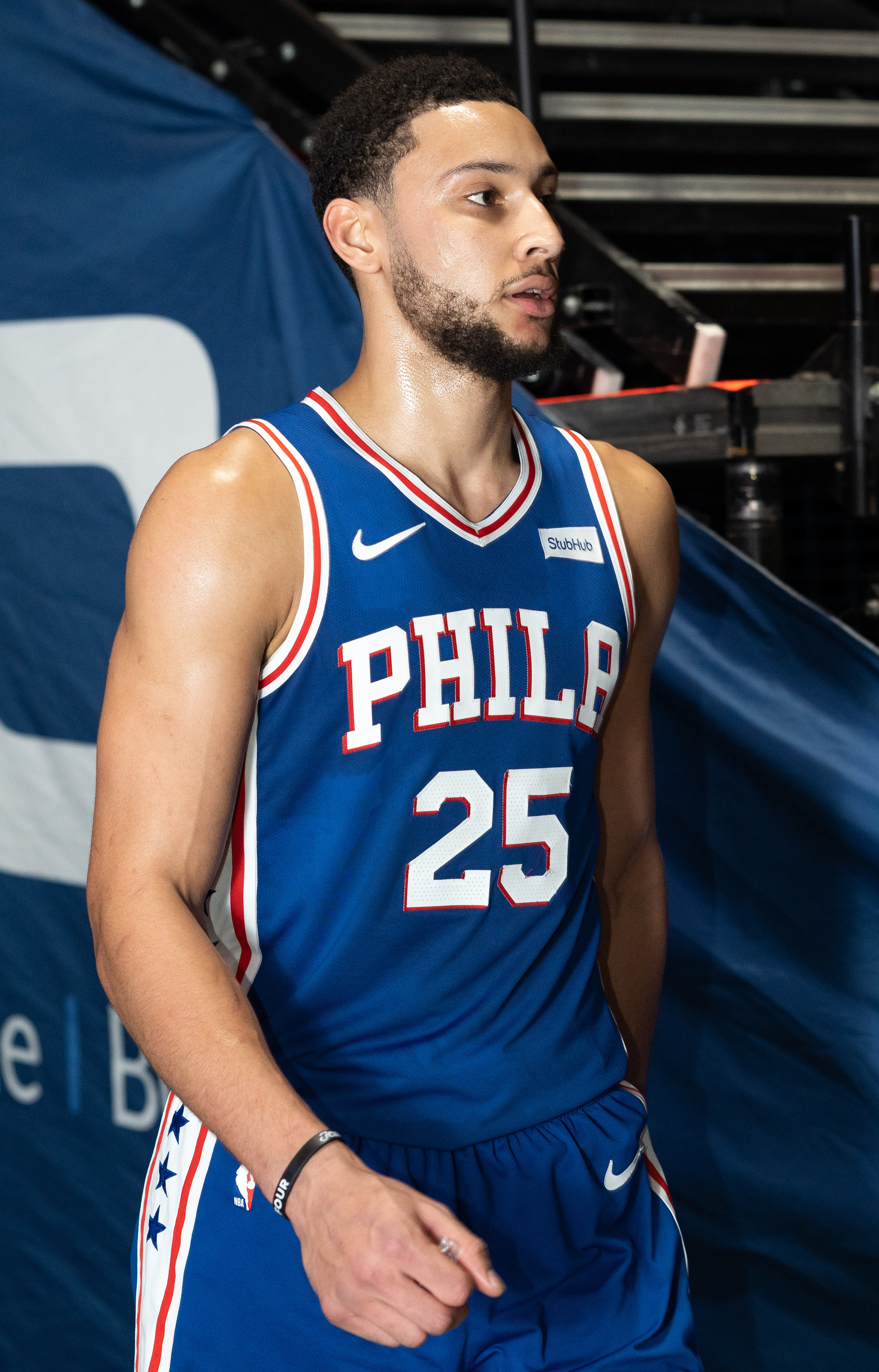
Ben Simmons, the 76ers' first overall draft selection in the 2016 NBA draft

On April 6, 2016, Sam Hinkie resigned with a 7,000-word letter of resignation. On April 10, 2016, Bryan Colangelo, the son of Jerry Colangelo, was named president of basketball operations. In the NBA Draft Lottery, the Philadelphia 76ers earned the first pick in the draft, after they had a 25% chance of earning the spot.

On June 23, 2016, after the 2015–16 season, and after the 76ers were awarded the first overall pick in the 2016 draft, the team selected LSU Point Forward Ben Simmons first overall. The 76ers also selected French basketball player Timothé Luwawu-Cabarrot and Turkish basketball player Furkan Korkmaz with the 24th and 26th picks in the 2016 NBA draft respectively. Many consider the 2016 NBA Draft a turning point for the 76ers. They had the first pick after three uncompetitive seasons, the first time the team owned the first since 1996 when the 76ers selected point guard Allen Iverson first overall. The 76ers subsequently traded for another number one pick in the 2017 NBA draft, choosing Markelle Fultz.

==== 2017–2018: Return to playoffs ====
The 2017–18 season was the most successful season since the 2011–12 season as the team finished the regular season in third place in the Eastern Conference with a 52–30 winning record and clinched a playoff spot. The season also saw the 76ers reaching a franchise-record 16-game winning streak. In the first round of the 2018 playoffs, the team defeated the Heat in five games to win its first playoff series since the 2011–12 season.

===== 2018–2019: Jimmy Butler year =====
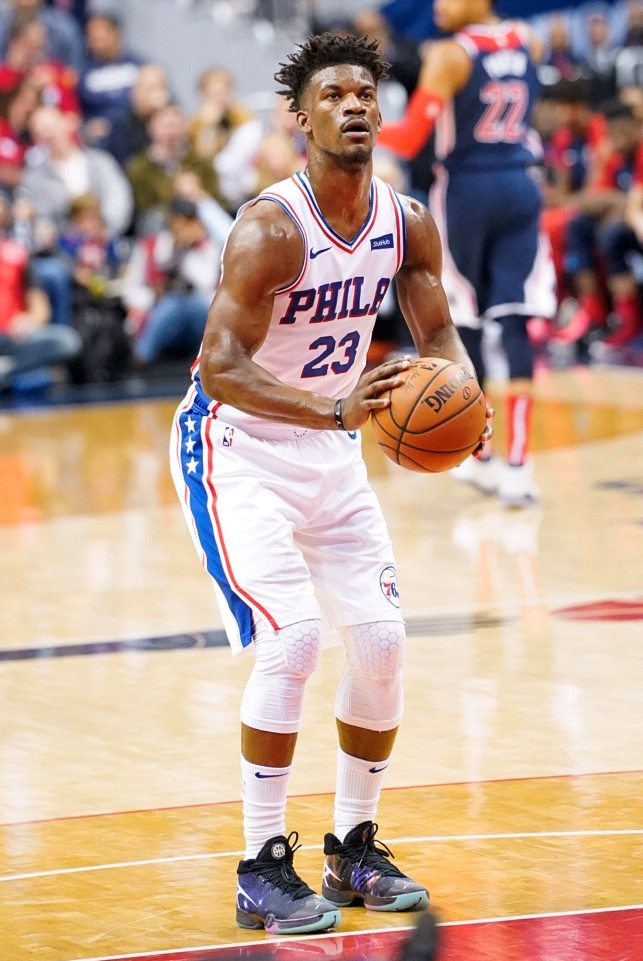
Jimmy Butler with the 76ers in 2019

After a controversy involving fake Twitter accounts, the 76ers parted ways with general manager Bryan Colangelo on June 7, 2018. The team promoted Elton Brand from executive vice president of basketball operations to fill the job on September 18, 2018.

On November 12, 2018, the 76ers traded Šarić, Robert Covington, Jerryd Bayless and a 2022 second-round draft pick to the Minnesota Timberwolves in exchange for Jimmy Butler and Justin Patton.

On February 6, 2019, the 76ers acquired forward Tobias Harris, as well as Boban Marjanović and Mike Scott, in a trade with the Los Angeles Clippers, sending Wilson Chandler, Mike Muscala, Landry Shamet, a protected 2020 first-round pick, Miami's unprotected 2021 first-round pick and Detroit's 2021 and 2023 second-round picks to the Clippers. The 76ers completed the season as the third seed. In the playoffs, they beat the Brooklyn Nets in five games in the first round and faced the second-seeded Toronto Raptors in the second round. The series went to seven games, which the 76ers lost 4–3, when Kawhi Leonard made a game-winning buzzer-beater in game 7 in Toronto.

In the off-season, Jimmy Butler left to sign with the Miami Heat in a sign and trade that brought Josh Richardson to Philadelphia. The team also signed Al Horford.

On November 25, 2019, the 76ers made history by signing the first deal between a betting operator and an individual NBA team. The deal was with Fox Bet, the joint venture of online gambling operator The Stars Group and broadcaster Fox Sports. It followed various NBA deals with betting operators signed after the US Supreme Court struck down the federal betting ban in 2018.

==== 2020–2022: Final years of the Ben Simmons era ====
Before the season, the 76ers were expected to contend for another championship, as they were in the past two seasons, especially with Kawhi Leonard having left the conference. The team had one of the worst away records in the NBA, but its league-best home record, with only two losses, kept the team afloat in the playoff race.

After the suspension of the 2019–20 NBA season, the 76ers were one of the 22 teams invited to the NBA Bubble to participate in the final eight games of the regular season. The 76ers started the bubble in the sixth seed, tied with the Pacers, who had the tiebreaker. The regular season finished with the 76ers in the sixth seed, a notable decrease in position from the previous two seasons. In the first round of the playoffs, the 76ers were eliminated by the Celtics in a 4–0 sweep. Head coach Brett Brown was fired on August 24, 2020.

On October 3, 2020, the 76ers hired Doc Rivers as their head coach. On November 2, the 76ers hired Daryl Morey to be their president of basketball operations. The 76ers went 49–23 and clinched the first seed in the Eastern Conference, capturing the division title for the first time in 20 years. In the opening round, they defeated the Washington Wizards in five games but lost to the Atlanta Hawks in the conference semifinals in seven games. Franchise player Joel Embiid, placed second in the voting for the NBA Most Valuable Player Award for the 2020–21 regular season, behind Nikola Jokić.

After the game 7 loss to the Hawks in which Ben Simmons controversially passed on an open dunk to tie the game, Simmons demanded a trade and held out from participating in training camp. The 76ers fined Simmons for conduct detrimental to the team, reportedly in excess of $19 million.

==== 2022–2024: Embiid MVP campaign and the James Harden years ====
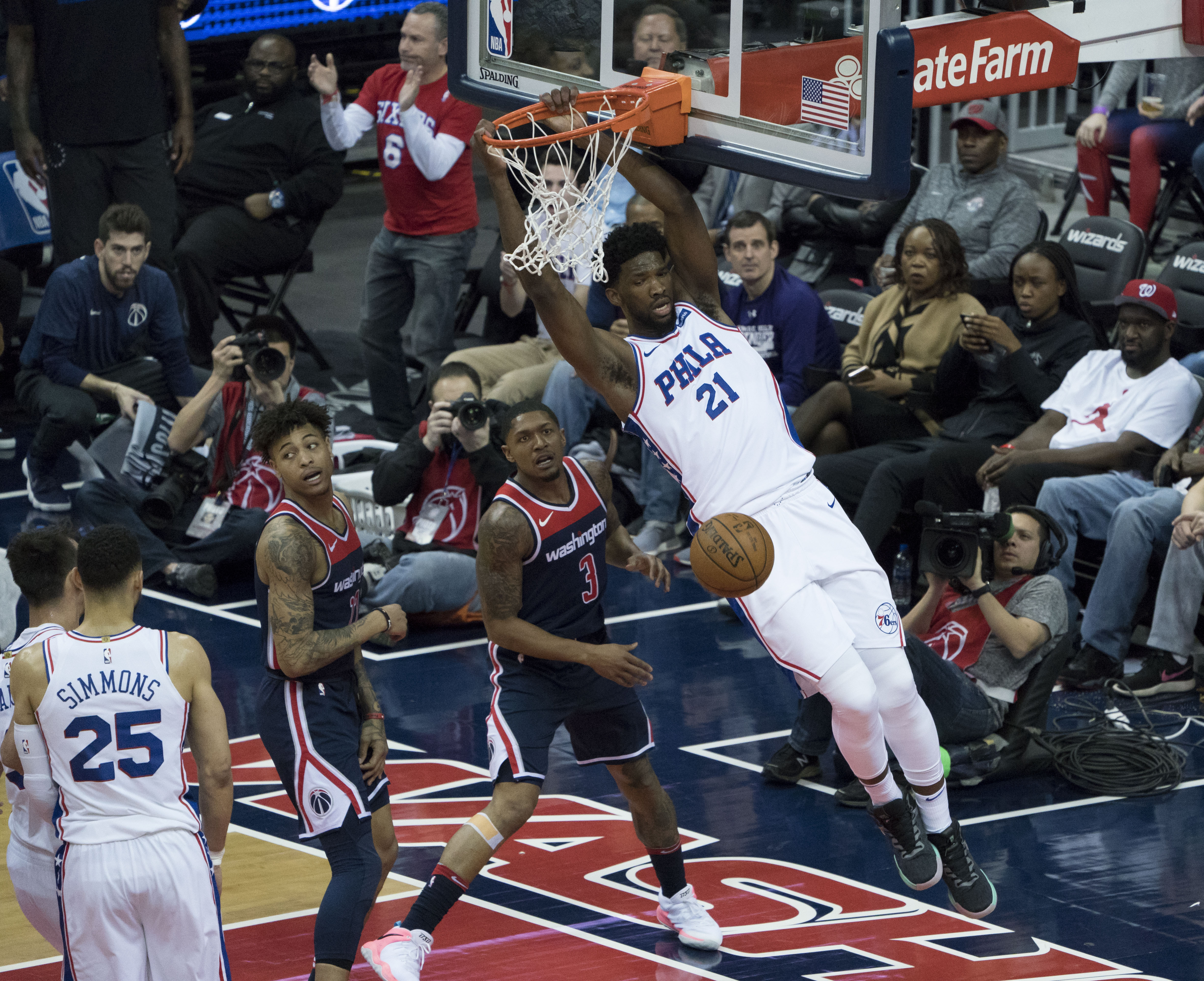
Joel Embiid dunking the ball during a 2018 76ers game. He was named the team's fifth NBA Most Valuable Player in 2023

On February 10, 2022, the 76ers acquired James Harden and Paul Millsap from the Brooklyn Nets in exchange for Simmons, Andre Drummond, Seth Curry, and two first-round picks. The 2021–22 season finished with a 51–31 record, led by Embiid, Harden, and second-year shooting guard Tyrese Maxey. Embiid won the scoring title averaging 30.6 points per game. In a repeat of the previous season's MVP race, Embiid finished second in the 2021–22 NBA Most Valuable Player Award contest behind Nikola Jokić.

On June 24, they traded Danny Green and the 23rd pick of the draft for De'Anthony Melton. In a four team trade, the 76ers acquired Jalen McDaniels but had to give up perimeter defender Matisse Thybulle who got traded to the Portland Trail Blazers. The 2022–23 season was successful for the 76ers as they clinched a playoff spot on March 21. They finished the season 54–28 as the third seed. After sweeping the Brooklyn Nets, the Boston Celtics prevailed in seven games and gave Philadelphia another second-round exit. Despite this, Joel Embiid was named league MVP.

On May 16, 2023, head coach Doc Rivers was fired and replaced by Nick Nurse on June 1. The team traded James Harden, P. J. Tucker and Filip Petrušev to the Los Angeles Clippers for Marcus Morris, Robert Covington, and Nicolas Batum. The 76ers started the season 29–13 as the second seed in the East, but Joel Embiid tore his lateral meniscus. Embiid returned on March 5. During Joel's absence, the 76ersfell to the eighth seed and Tyrese Maxey made his first All-Star game. They finished the season as the seventh seed with a record of 47–35, qualifying for the play-in game. The 76ers made it out of the play-in, beating the Miami Heat to advance to the playoffs but were beaten 4–2 in the first round by the New York Knicks.

==== 2024–2026: Arrival of Paul George and end of the Daryl Morey era ====
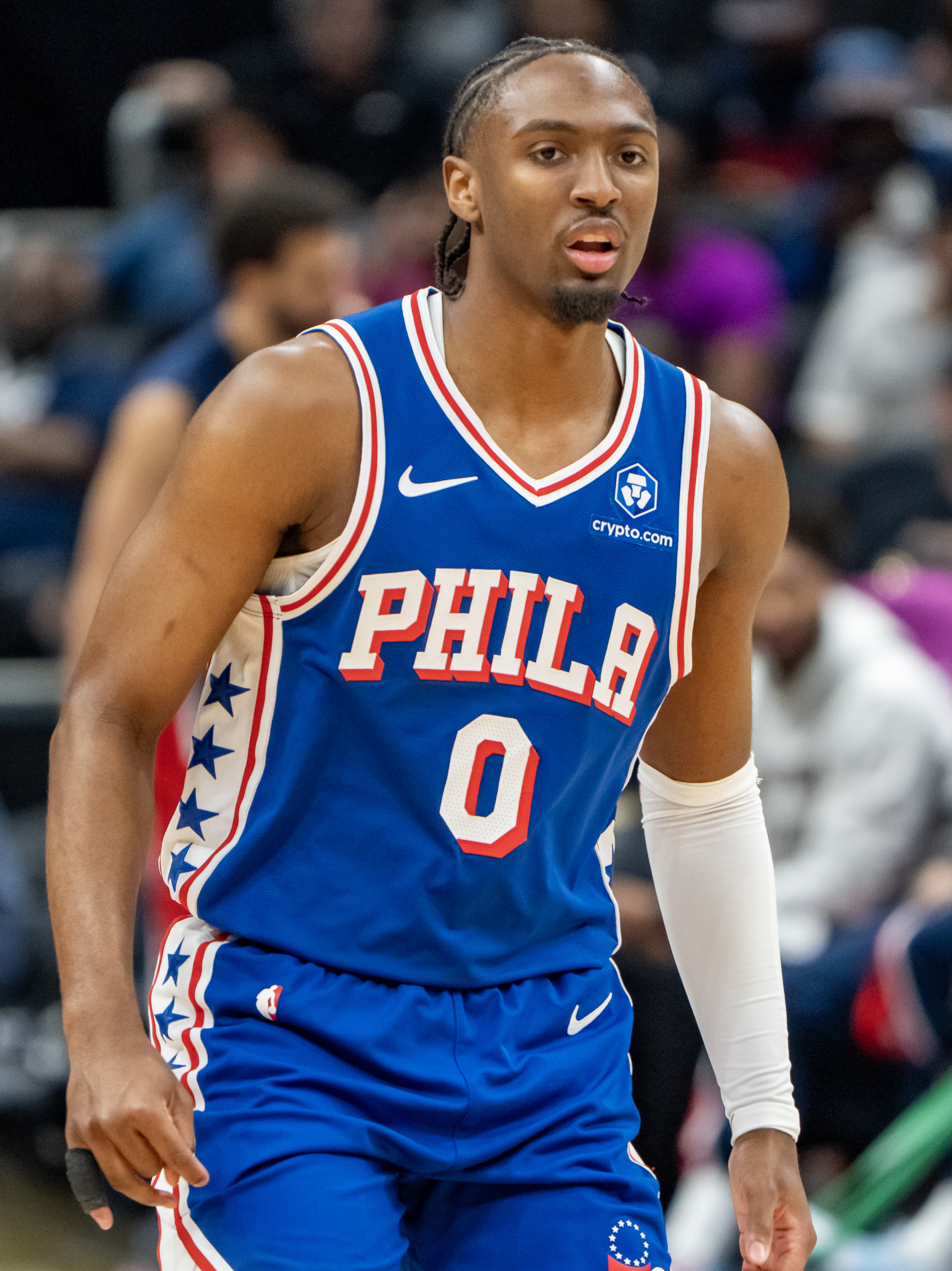
Tyrese Maxey in 2026

That off-season, Paul George signed a four-year max contract deal with the 76ers. They also resigned Kyle Lowry and acquired Eric Gordon. Tobias Harris also signed with the Pistons.

On May 12, 2026, Morey was fired after a second-round sweep by the Knicks. The team then named former Warriors general manager Bob Myers as the interim president of basketball operations. He will lead the department while searching for Morey's permanent replacement.

==== 2026–present: Arrival of Jaylen Brown and LeBron James ====
During the 2026 off-season, the 76ers traded Paul George, two first-round picks and two second-round picks to the Boston Celtics in exchange for Jaylen Brown. On July 27, 2026, the 76ers signed LeBron James to a two-year, $8 million deal.

== Team identity ==
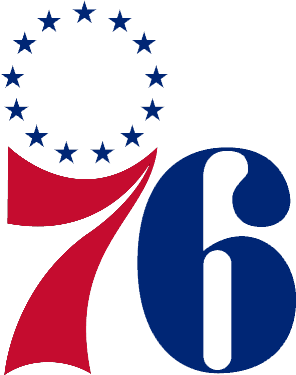
Primary logo, 1963 to 1977

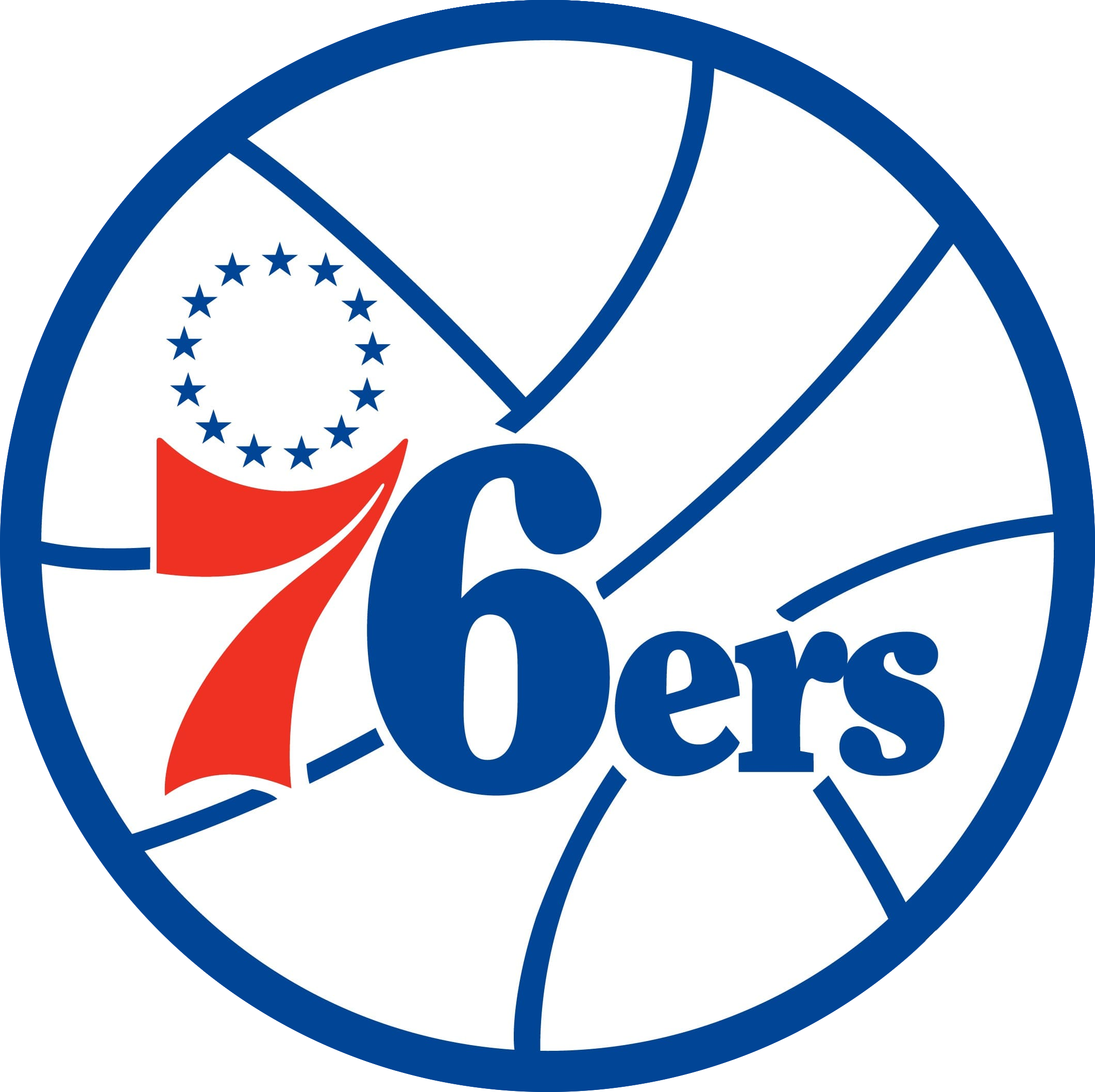
Primary logo, 1977 to 1996

Primary logo, 2009 to 2015

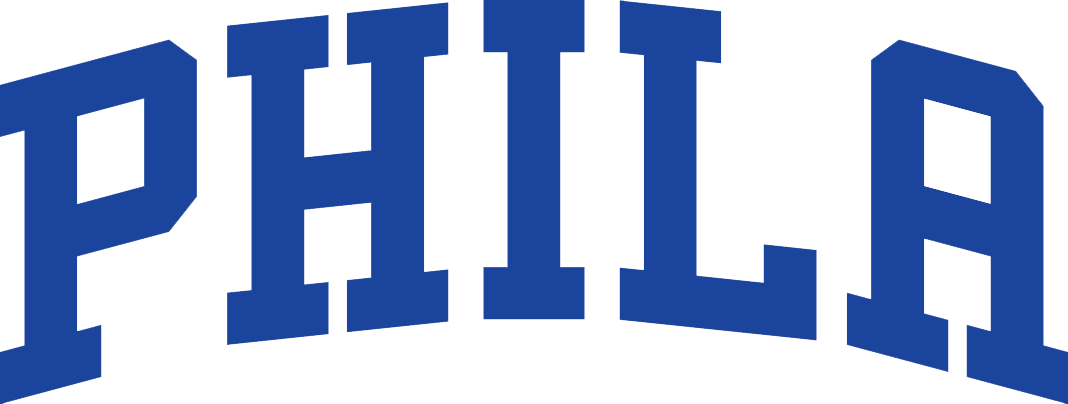
Wordmark logo, 2015 to present

=== 1963–1978 ===
The Philadelphia 76ers' original logo featured a stylized red "7" and blue "6" with 13 blue stars above the "7" to represent the original 13 American colonies. During this period the franchise employed many uniform changes.

The original uniform featured "PHILA" in front and the aforementioned 13 stars encircling the "76" on the shorts and the uniform number at the back. Monochrome red letters were emblazoned on either the blue road or white home uniform, and were written in a similar manner as the logo.

During the 1965–66 season, the 76ers experimented with a two-tone design. The home white uniform now had a thick red band across the abdomen, while the road uniform featured red tops and blue shorts. "PHILA" was positioned below the uniform number. Players disliked the design and was replaced after only one season.

The 76ers unveiled a cleaner design for the 1966–67 season, with "PHILA" in red block letters and trimmed in either white or blue. "PHILA" was also moved back above the number. The logo and stars were removed in favor of simple side stripes. Initially, the 76ers wore blue uniforms on the road, but in 1968, they changed back to red uniforms with "PHILA" in white with blue trim.

For the 1970–71 season, the 76ers tinkered with their red uniforms, switching the color scheme on the letters to blue with white trim. Meanwhile, the white uniform received a more radical makeover, featuring the full name "Seventy Sixers" in red cursive lettering with blue trim. This set lasted for only one season.

The 1971–72 season saw the 76ers return to wearing blue uniforms on the road. After sporting "PHILA" on the chest for eight seasons, the uniform now read "Sixers" in Art Deco style lettering, rendered in white on the road and red at home. Numbers were either white or blue with red trim. Contrasting side stripes were added and extended through the uniform, and either red or white stars were placed on each side. Before the 1976–77 season, the 76ers tweaked the uniform, now sporting a block "Sixers" wordmark and rounded numbers. The next season, the "Sixers" wordmark was changed to Bookman Old Style; on both iterations, "Sixers" became blue with red trim on the white uniform, with an additional outline on the latter.

During the 1975–76 season, general manager Pat Williams tasked employee Randy Childress with writing and recording a fight song for the team. Recorded by Childress's band Fresh Aire, "Here Come the Sixers" was played at home games from 1975 through the mid-1980s. In the early 2000s, 94.1 WIP host Angelo Cataldi reintroduced the song. It has since been popularized as an unofficial anthem for the team.

=== 1978–1997 ===
In 1977, the 76ers' logo was tweaked to include a white basketball with blue outlines and the suffix "-ers" in blue, completing the team nickname. The next season saw the team go back to basics with their uniforms.

Starting with the 1978–79 season, the 76ers wore a cleaner uniform design reminiscent of their late 1960s outfits. Side stripes were eliminated and the team logo was emblazoned on the right leg. The road uniform color was changed back to red (with the lettering scheme similar to the 1968–70 red uniforms), and the numbers revert to a block letter style.

Before the 1991–92 season, the 76ers experimented with a more radical uniform design. The front featured a blue wave with red, white and blue stars, and "Sixers" in Helvetica was affixed above the blue wave. The full city name "Philadelphia" was also added above the team name. The numbers contained drop shadows.

After wearing the graphic-laden design for three seasons, the 76ers changed to a more basic look entering the 1994–95 season. The design contained thick blue stripes within either thin red or white stripes, and the letters were changed to a more classic rounded style. Numbers were now rendered in blue on both uniforms with either white or red trim, and the white uniform again featured "Sixers" in red letters with white and blue trim.

=== 1997–2009 ===
In the 1997–98 season, the 76ers drastically changed their logo and colors in an effort to appeal to the more youthful hip-hop-oriented culture. Red, white and blue were retained, but only as trim colors. Instead, the 76ers used black, silver and gold as its core colors, with the logo now featuring 76ers in gold, a single silver star within the 7, and a streaking basketball below the logo.

The black road uniforms remained largely unchanged throughout this span, with the letters in white with red trim. The white home uniform, on the other hand, featured some subtle changes. While the letters were in black with red trim, the "Sixers" logo was initially gold, but in 2000, the color was changed as black. Also in 2000, the black background and red outline within the "Sixers" logo were removed. A blue alternate uniform was introduced in the same year, with the letters in white with red trim; the arm piping was removed after only one season. All three designs contained a gold star on the neckline, added the alternate "streaking 76" logo on the shorts, and featured the "Sixers" logo written in the same manner as the logo, with the silver star affixed atop the "I".

In 2006, the 76ers replaced the blue alternates with a red one, bringing back the "PHILA" logo for the first time since 1971. As with the other uniforms, the "PHILA" wordmark was shaped similarly to the team logo, with the silver star atop the "I". White numbers with black trim were placed on this uniform, along with a silver star on the neckline and blue and white striping. The next season saw some minor tweaks to the black and white uniforms, which now featured the same striping patterns as the red alternate along with the silver star.

=== 2009–2015 ===
During the 2008–09 season, while the previous logo was still in use, the 1977–1997 logo was revived to coincide with the team's 60th anniversary (counting the Syracuse years). After that, the team decided to bring back a modern version of said logo, with the addition of a red square and 'Philadelphia' inside a blue rectangle below it, although the partial logo without the square, city name and rectangles was also used.

The white uniform featured "Sixers" in blue and numbers in red, both returning to a block letter style. The red uniform contained both the "Sixers" and the uniform number in white. In 2011, a blue alternate uniform was introduced, mirroring that of the red uniform. After 2013, the blue uniform became the primary road set. All three designs employed a more subtle striping along the arms and legs.

=== 2015–present ===
A new version of the classic 76ers logo was unveiled for the 2015–16 season, featuring a slight tilt to the white basketball and a roundel featuring the city name and six stars. A secondary "Dribbling Ben Franklin" logo was also introduced.

The home white, away blue and red alternate uniforms featured a mix of classic styles used in previous uniforms. The home white and away blue uniforms featured the 'PHILA' wordmark as homage to the late 1960s uniforms, while the red alternates featured the 'SIXERS' wordmark in tribute to the 1980s uniforms. Side stripes featuring seven stars on one side and six on the other pay homage to the 1970s uniforms, while the shoulder piping was a callback to the 1980s uniforms. The inscription 'PHILA TOUGH' is sewed on the bottom of all uniforms.

The switch to Nike in 2017 saw the 76ers make some slight tweaks to their uniform set. The blue "Icon" uniform and the white "Association" uniform now feature a red drop shadow on the lettering, and the inscription 'Brotherly Love' replaced 'PHILA TOUGH' near the manufacturer's tag. The 76ers also released their new red "Statement" uniform, featuring a script "Sixers" wordmark, off-centered numbers and blue drop shadows. Before the 2019–20 season the red uniforms were tweaked to feature a script "Phila" wordmark.

=== City and Earned uniforms ===
The team's first annual "City" uniform features an ornate "Phila" lettering, blue numbers with red drop shadows, and other elements inspired from the United States Declaration of Independence in 1776. This design was reused in the 2026–27 season. Their second "City" uniform, inspired by the 1976 film Rocky, shows thirteen stars to represent the Thirteen Colonies. It was based on Rocky because it was from "'76".

By virtue of qualifying for the 2018 playoffs, the 76ers were also given an "Earned" uniform in the 2018–19 season. The team's "Earned" uniforms were similar to the Rocky "City" uniforms, except that the base was white and the lettering and stars were in blue.

The team's "City" uniform for the 2019–20 season paid homage to the Liberty Bell, featuring an ornate "Philadelphia" wordmark and red serifed numbers. The gold bell silhouette is prominently featured on the beltline. This design returned for the 2025–26 season, but recolored in navy blue.

The 2020–21 "City" uniform paid homage to the Allen Iverson era and the Boathouse Row landmark, featuring a black base with red, blue and white accents. The Boathouse Row illustration is drawn in white above "Philadelphia" in white with blue drop shadows. The numbers, also in white with blue drop shadows, are placed on the left chest.

The team's "Earned" uniform for 2021 (after qualifying in the 2020 playoffs) featured a blue silhouette of the Liberty Bell on a white background, with white numbers placed in the middle.

In commemoration of the NBA's 75th anniversary, the 2021–22 "City" uniforms featured elements of previous uniform designs (a.k.a. "Mixtape"). The team's edition featured a navy blue base and red lettering taken from the 1972–77 uniforms. Red, orange, green and blue blocks on each side paid tribute to the team's former home, the Spectrum, and also represented fan support for each of Philadelphia's "Big Four" teams (red representing the Philadelphia Phillies, orange representing the Flyers, green representing the Eagles, and blue representing the 76ers). The Spectrum center court logo, featuring the arena silhouette at the center, adorned the shorts, and the "S" from that logo was placed on the waist.

The 2022–23 "City" uniform centered around Philadelphia's Greek translation of the "City of Brotherly Love", which was inscribed in front of the uniform. The mostly minimalist style uniform has a white base, red text and striping, and blue trim, and was inspired by the city's love of basketball in all levels.

For the 2023–24 "City" uniform, the 76ers again went with the "City of Brotherly Love" theme, featuring a letter style inspired by the neon signage of the Reading Terminal Market. The navy-based uniform again incorporated the "13 star circle", Liberty Bell silhouette, and the "Bicentennial 76" insignia.

The "City" uniform for the 2024–25 season was based on the 2021–22 "City" uniform, albeit in white with blue numbers.

== Mascots ==
Previously in the 1980s, the Philadelphia 76ers mascot was Big Shot. He was then replaced with Hip Hop, a rabbit that usually, during time-outs or halftime, would do slam dunks. After the 2011 lockout, Hip Hop would not return.

=== Franklin the Dog ===
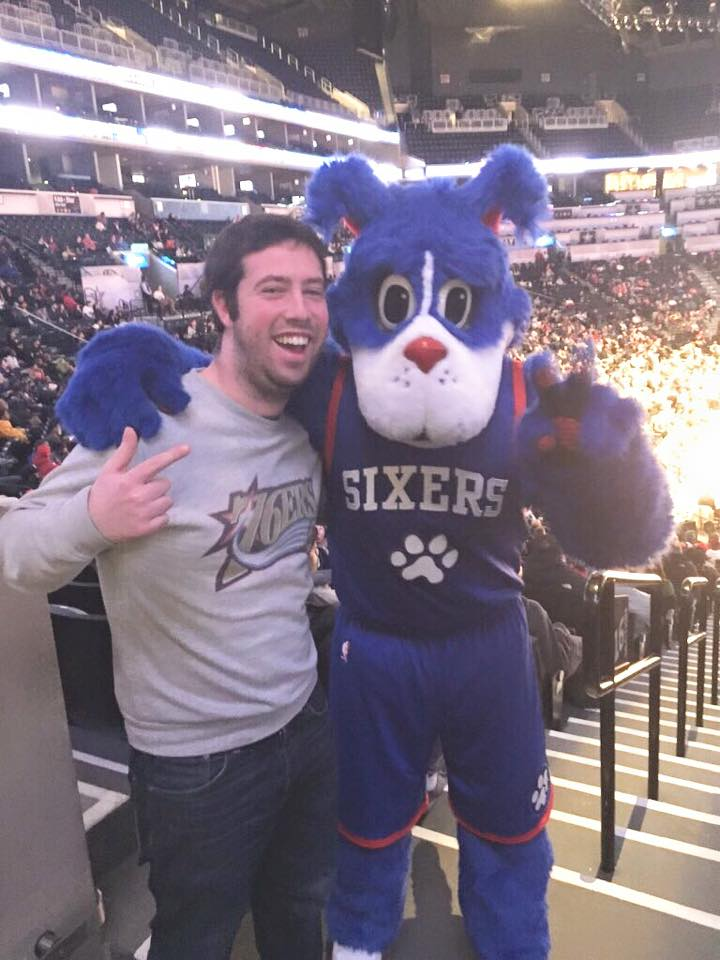
Franklin the Dog with a fan at 2015 NBA All-Star Weekend

On February 10, 2015, Franklin the Dog was introduced as the new Philadelphia 76ers mascot to 400 fans and media at The Franklin Institute. After spending the weekend in New York City for the 2015 NBA All-Star Game as the newest NBA mascot, he then was introduced at the Wells Fargo Center in his first game on February 19, 2015.

== Rivalries ==
=== Boston Celtics ===
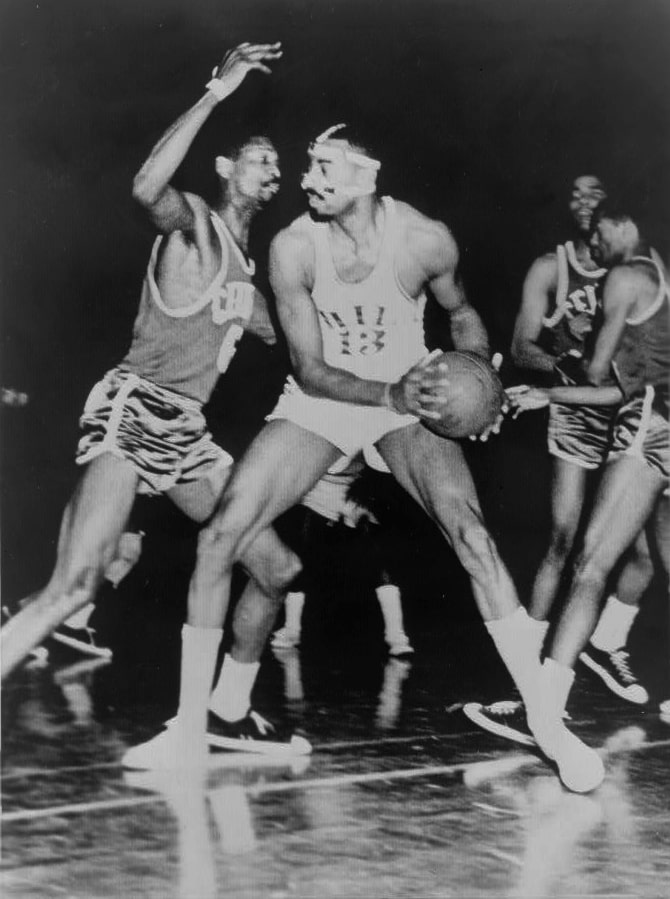
Wilt Chamberlain being defended by Bill Russell with the Boston Celtics during the 1966–67 season

The rivalry between the 76ers and Boston Celtics is the earliest dated rivalry in the NBA. The two teams have the most meetings in the NBA playoffs, playing each other in nineteen series, of which the Celtics have won twelve. It is considered to be the second-greatest rivalry in the NBA, next to the Celtics–Lakers rivalry. The rivalry first peaked when Wilt Chamberlain and Bill Russell of the Celtics played each other from 1965 to 1968. The 1966–67 76ers, voted the best team in league history during the NBA's 35th anniversary, set a then-record by winning 68 games in the 81-game season (a record since broken by the Lakers, Bulls and Warriors) and ending Boston's eight-year title reign which led to the infamous "Boston's Dead!" chants.

The 76ers went through a rebuilding period through the early 1970s, and came back to relevance during the 1976–77 season, in which they defeated the Celtics en route to an NBA Finals appearance. Both teams would peak in the 1980s, with every single Eastern Conference championship between 1980 and 1987 belonging to either the 76ers or Celtics. The Larry Bird-led Celtics won five of them, while the Julius Erving-led 76ers won the other three. The Charles Barkley-led teams of the later 1980s took the fight to the Celtics; neither team experienced much playoff success in the late 1980s, and both took steep nosedives in the Eastern Conference rankings throughout the 1990s.

The rivalry was reborn in the 2000s. The first time, the Allen Iverson-led defending-Eastern Conference champions 76ers were defeated in the first round of the 2002 playoffs by the Paul Pierce-led Celtics 3–2. The second time, exactly ten years later, the Big Three Celtics (Kevin Garnett, Paul Pierce and Ray Allen) defeated the valiant eight seed 76ers team 4–3. In the ten years in between, the 76ers would experience limited success whereas the Celtics won a championship and contended for most of that span. In a memorable 2006 regular season meeting between the two, the 76ers defeated the Celtics 125–124 in triple overtime, with Iverson leading the way with 33 points and 10 assists.

=== Toronto Raptors ===
The 76ers-Raptors rivalry has seen intense playoff battles, including Kawhi Leonard's 2019 game 7 buzzer-beater and Philadelphia's 2022 revenge series win. The Raptors lead the regular-season series, while the 76ers hold a slight edge in postseason meetings.

== Season-by-season record ==
List of the last five seasons completed by the 76ers. For the full season-by-season history, see List of Philadelphia 76ers seasons.

Note: GP = Games played, W = Wins, L = Losses, W–L% = Winning percentage

Season	GP	W	L	W–L%	Finish	Playoffs
2021–22	82	51	31	.622	2nd, Atlantic	Lost in conference semifinals, 2–4 (Heat)
2022–23	82	54	28	.659	2nd, Atlantic	Lost in conference semifinals, 3–4 (Celtics)
2023–24	82	47	35	.573	3rd, Atlantic	Lost in first round, 2–4 (Knicks)
2024–25	82	24	58	.293	5th, Atlantic	Did not qualify
2025–26	82	45	37	.549	4th, Atlantic	Lost in conference semifinals, 0–4 (Knicks)

== Facilities ==
=== Home arenas ===
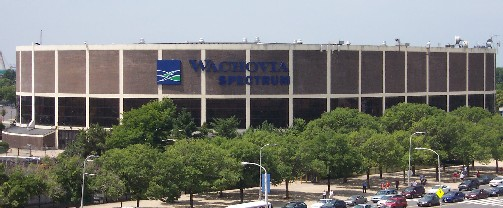
The Spectrum, shown in 2005, hosted the 76ers from 1967 to 1996.

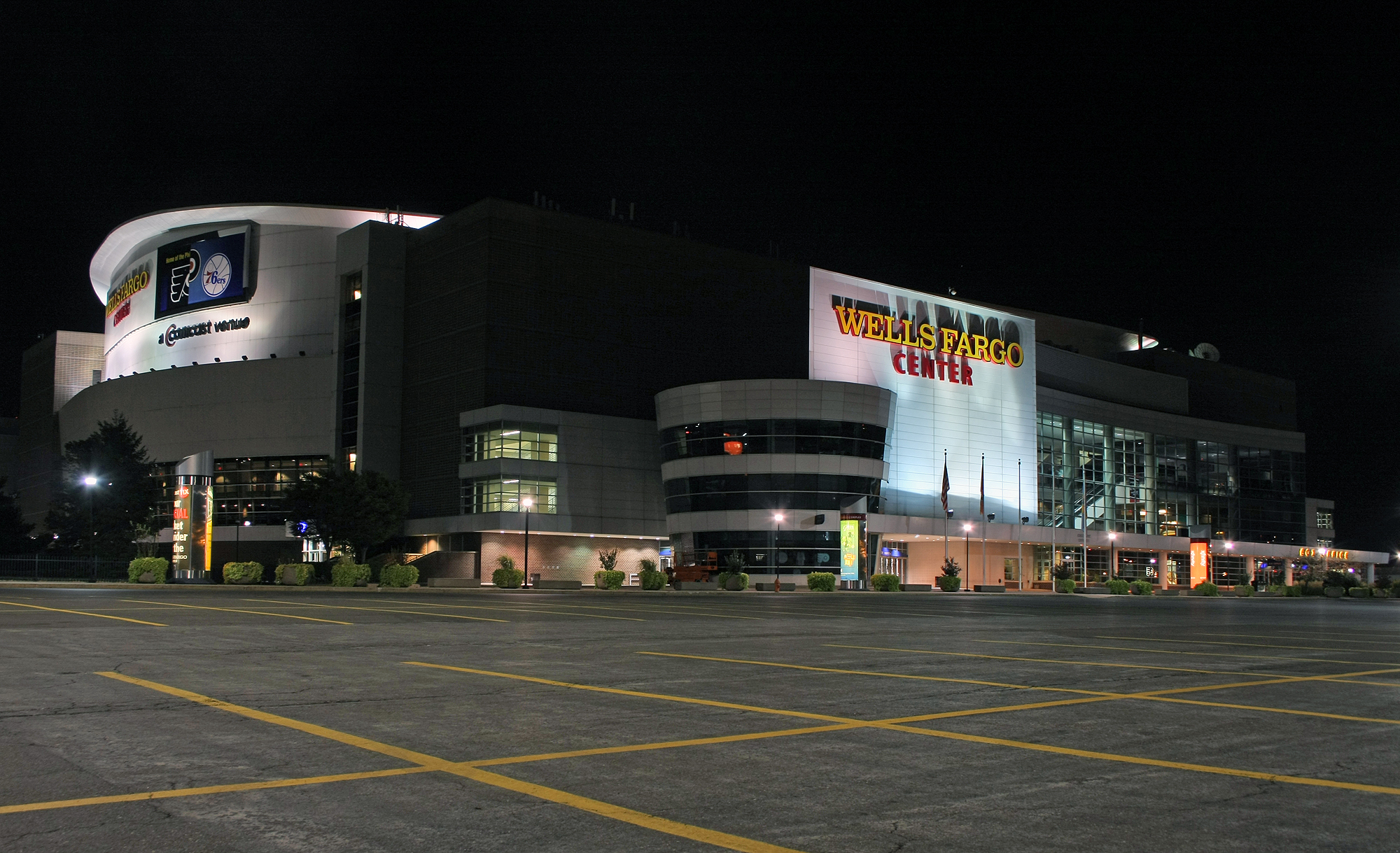
Xfinity Mobile Arena is the current home arena of the 76ers.

- State Fair Coliseum (1946–1951)
- Onondaga County War Memorial (1951–1963)
- Convention Hall and Philadelphia Arena (1963–1967)
- The Spectrum (1967–1996)
- Xfinity Mobile Arena (1996–present)

=== Training facility ===
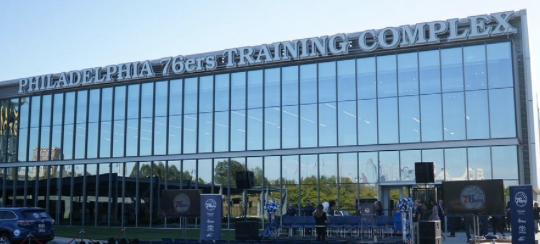
The 76ers' training complex in Camden, New Jersey

The 76ers' training facility and headquarters for basketball operations are located at the Philadelphia 76ers Training Complex in Camden, New Jersey. In 2014, the 76ers announced their plans to construct a new training complex, which was officially opened on September 23, 2016.

The team previously practiced at the campus of the Philadelphia College of Osteopathic Medicine.

=== New arena ===
In July 2022, the 76ers announced plans to construct a $1.3 billion, privately funded arena in Center City, Philadelphia called 76 Place. However, in January 2025, Harris Blitzer Sports & Entertainment (owners of the 76ers) and Comcast Spectacor (owners of the Philadelphia Flyers) agreed to a deal to construct a new arena inside the South Philadelphia Sports Complex that the two teams will share. The new arena is planned to open in 2031.

== Personnel ==
=== Current roster ===
Philadelphia 76ers roster
Players

Pos.	No.	Player	Height	Weight	DOB	From
F	25	Dominick Barlow (injured)	6 ft 9 in (2.06 m)	224 lb (102 kg)	2003-05-26	Saint Joseph's
F/C	30	Adem Bona	6 ft 10 in (2.08 m)	235 lb (107 kg)	2003-03-28	UCLA
G/F	7	Jaylen Brown	6 ft 6 in (1.98 m)	223 lb (101 kg)	1996-10-24	California
G	1	Kentavious Caldwell-Pope	6 ft 5 in (1.96 m)	204 lb (93 kg)	1993-02-18	Georgia
G	77	V. J. Edgecombe	6 ft 5 in (1.96 m)	190 lb (86 kg)	2005-07-30	Baylor
F	11	Justin Edwards	6 ft 7 in (2.01 m)	217 lb (98 kg)	2003-12-16	Kentucky
C	21	Joel Embiid	7 ft 0 in (2.13 m)	270 lb (122 kg)	1994-03-16	Kansas
C	99	Tacko Fall (TW)	7 ft 6 in (2.29 m)	311 lb (141 kg)	1995-12-10	Central Florida
C	55	Ariel Hukporti (injured)	7 ft 0 in (2.13 m)	246 lb (112 kg)	2002-04-12	Germany
F	23	LeBron James	6 ft 9 in (2.06 m)	250 lb (113 kg)	1984-12-30	St. Vincent–St. Mary HS (OH)
G	8	Caleb Love (TW)	6 ft 3 in (1.91 m)	212 lb (96 kg)	2001-09-27	Arizona
G	0	Tyrese Maxey	6 ft 2 in (1.88 m)	200 lb (91 kg)	2000-10-04	Kentucky
G	00	Labaron Philon Jr.	6 ft 3 in (1.91 m)	177 lb (80 kg)	2005-11-24	Alabama
G/F	12	Rayan Rupert (TW)	6 ft 7 in (2.01 m)	205 lb (93 kg)	2004-05-21	France
G	5	Anfernee Simons	6 ft 4 in (1.93 m)	200 lb (91 kg)	1999-06-08	IMG Academy (FL)
F/C	45	Dean Wade	6 ft 9 in (2.06 m)	228 lb (103 kg)	1996-11-20	Kansas State
F	33	Jabari Walker	6 ft 7 in (2.01 m)	237 lb (108 kg)	2002-07-30	Colorado

Coaches
Head coach
- Nick Nurse
Assistant(s)
- Matt Brase
- Fabulous Flournoy
- Bryan Gates
- Phil Handy
- Rico Hines
- Coby Karl
- Mike Longabardi
- Doug West
- Dice Yoshimoto

Legend
- (DP) Unsigned draft pick
- (FA) Free agent
- (S) Suspended
- (GL) On assignment to G League affiliate
- (TW) Two-way affiliate player
- Injured

Roster
Updated: August 22, 2026

=== Retained draft rights ===
Occasionally, the 76ers hold the draft rights to unsigned draft picks who have been playing outside the NBA. A drafted player, either an international draftee or a college draftee who is not signed by the team that drafted him, is allowed to sign with any non-NBA teams. In this case, the team retains the player's draft rights in the NBA until one year after the player's contract with the non-NBA team ends. This list includes draft rights that were acquired from trades with other teams.

Draft	Round	Pick	Player	Pos.	Nationality	Current team	Note(s)	Ref

== Franchise leaders and records ==
=== Retired numbers ===
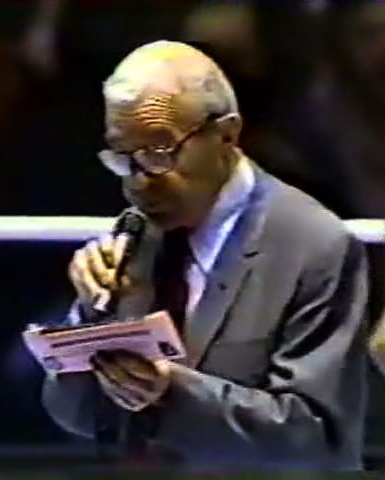
Dave Zinkoff, the 76ers public address announcer from the 1950s through the 1980s

All of the 76ers' retired numbers are hanging on the rafters in Xfinity Mobile Arena.

Philadelphia 76ers retired numbers and honorees
No.	Player	Position	Tenure	Date of Retirement
2	Moses Malone	C	1982–1986; 1993–1994	February 8, 2019
3	Allen Iverson	G	1996–2006; 2009–2010	March 1, 2014
4	Dolph Schayes	F/C	1948–1964 ^{1} ^{2}	March 12, 2016
6^{3}	Julius Erving	F	1976–1987	April 18, 1988
10	Maurice Cheeks	G	1978–1989 ^{4}	February 6, 1995
13	Wilt Chamberlain	C	1965–1968 ^{5}	March 18, 1991
15	Hal Greer	G	1958–1973 ^{6}	November 19, 1976
24	Bobby Jones	F	1978–1986	November 7, 1986
32	Billy Cunningham	F	1965–1972; 1974–1976 ^{7}	December 17, 1976
34	Charles Barkley	F	1984–1992	March 30, 2001
	Dave Zinkoff	Public-address announcer	1963–1985 ^{8}	March 25, 1986

Notes:

- ^{1} Also served as player-coach (1963–1966).
- ^{2} Nerlens Noel wore the number at the time of the announcement (2013–2017)
- ^{3} Also retired league-wide in honor of Bill Russell on August 11, 2022.
- ^{4} Also served as head coach (2005–2008).
- ^{5} Also Philadelphia native, and Philadelphia Warriors, 1959–1962.
- ^{6} 1958–1963 in Syracuse
- ^{7} Also served as head coach (1977–1985).
- ^{8} Also Philadelphia Warriors, (1946–1962).

=== Basketball Hall of Famers ===
Philadelphia 76ers Basketball Hall of Famers
Players
No.	Name	Position	Tenure	Inducted	No.	Name	Position	Tenure	Inducted
4; 8; 55	Dolph Schayes ^{1}	F/C	1948–1964	1973	13	Wilt Chamberlain	C	1965–1968	1979
15	Hal Greer	G/F	1958–1973	1982	15	Al Cervi ^{2}	F/G	1948–1953	1985
32	Billy Cunningham ^{3}	F/C	1965–1972; 1974–1976	1986	6	Julius Erving	F	1976–1987	1993
12	George Yardley	F/G	1959–1960	1996	16	Bailey Howell	F/G	1970–1971	1997
11	Bob McAdoo	F/C	1986	2000	2	Moses Malone	C/F	1982–1986; 1993–1994	2001
32; 34	Charles Barkley ^{4}	F/G	1984–1992	2006	25	Chet Walker	F	1962–1969	2012
55	Dikembe Mutombo	C	2001–2002	2015	3	Allen Iverson	G	1996–2006; 2009–2010	2016
30	George McGinnis	F	1975–1978	2017	10	Maurice Cheeks ^{5}	G	1978–1989	2018
24	Bobby Jones	F	1978–1986	2019	7	Toni Kukoč	F	2000–2001	2021
4	Chris Webber	F	2005–2007	2021	5	Dick Barnett	G	1959–1961	2024
39	Dwight Howard ^{11}	C	2020–2021	2025					
Coaches
Name		Position	Tenure	Inducted	Name		Position	Tenure	Inducted
Jack Ramsay		Head coach	1968–1972	1992	Chuck Daly		Assistant coach	1978–1981	1994
10	Alex Hannum ^{6}	Head coach	1960–1963; 1966–1968	1998	Larry Brown		Head coach	1997–2003	2002
John Calipari		Assistant coach	1999–2000	2015	Doc Rivers		Head coach	2020–2023	2026
Contributors
Name		Position	Tenure	Inducted	Name		Position	Tenure	Inducted
Danny Biasone ^{7}		Founder; Owner	1946–1963	2000	8; 11	Earl Lloyd ^{8}	F	1952–1958	2003
Jerry Colangelo		Executive	2015–2016	2004	Rod Thorn		President	2010–2013	2018
6; 15; 21	Larry Costello ^{9}	G	1957–1965; 1966–68	2022	20	Doug Collins ^{10}	Head coach	2010–2013	2024
Mike D'Antoni ^{12}		Associate head coach	2015–2016	2026					

Notes:

- ^{1} He also coached the team in 1963–1966.
- ^{2} He also coached the team in 1948–1958.
- ^{3} He also coached the team in 1977–1985.
- ^{4} In total, Barkley was inducted into the Hall of Fame twice – as player and as a member of the 1992 Olympic team.
- ^{5} Also served as assistant coach (1994–2001) and head coach (2005–2008).
- ^{6} He also played for the team in 1949–1951.
- ^{7} Inducted posthumously.
- ^{8} Lloyd was inducted as a contributor as the first African American player and bench coach in the NBA.
- ^{9} Costello was inducted as a contributor.
- ^{10} Collins also played for the team in 1973–1981.
- ^{11} In total, Howard was inducted into the Hall of Fame twice – as player and as a member of the 2008 Olympic team.
- ^{12} In total, D'Antoni was inducted into the Hall of Fame twice – as contributor and as a member of the 2008 Olympic team.

=== FIBA Hall of Famers ===
Philadelphia 76ers Hall of Famers
Players
No.	Name	Position	Tenure	Inducted
7	Toni Kukoč	F	2000–2001	2017
Coaches
Chuck Daly ^{1}		Assistant coach	1978–1981	2021

Notes:

- ^{1} In total, Daly was inducted into the FIBA Hall of Fame twice – as coach and as a member of the 1992 Olympic team.

== Esports ventures ==
In September 2016, the 76ers acquired both Team Dignitas and Apex Gaming and merged them under the Dignitas brand, becoming the first North American professional sports team to own an esports team.

== See also ==
- South Philadelphia Sports Complex
- Sports in Philadelphia

== Notes ==
Preceded by Minneapolis Lakers	NBA champions 1954–55	Succeeded by Philadelphia Warriors
Preceded by Boston Celtics	NBA champions 1966–67	Succeeded by Boston Celtics
Preceded by Los Angeles Lakers	NBA champions 1982–83	Succeeded by Boston Celtics
