= History of the Philadelphia 76ers =

The Philadelphia 76ers is an American basketball team that currently plays in the Atlantic Division of the Eastern Conference in the National Basketball Association (NBA). Founded in 1946 as the Syracuse Nationals, the 76ers have won three NBA championships and are third in NBA history in wins and playoff appearances, as of 2026.

== 1946–1963: Syracuse Nationals ==
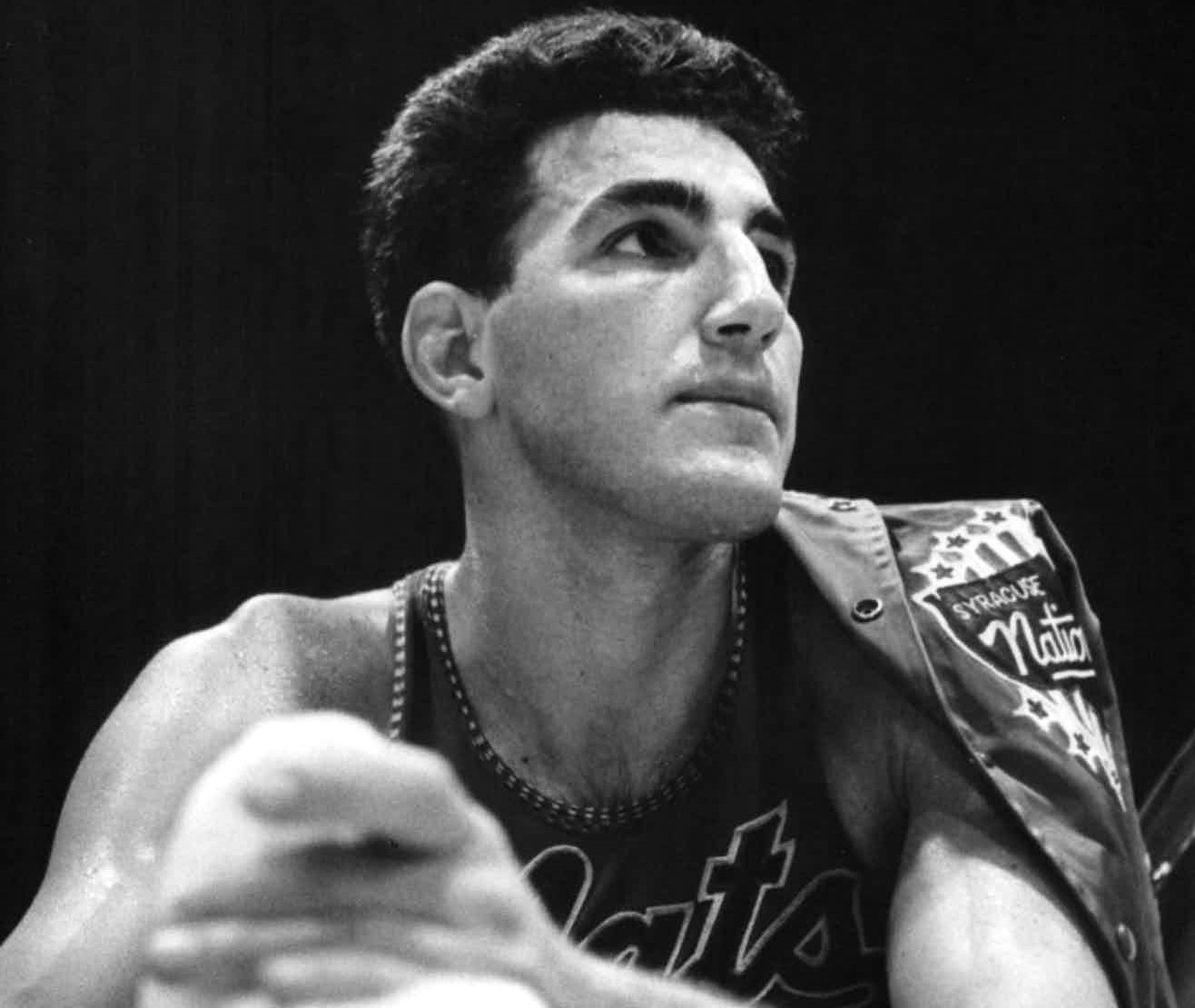
Dolph Schayes joined the Syracuse Nationals in 1948 and played with them until they moved to Philadelphia after the 1962–63 season. He retired in 1964 after playing 1,059 games for the franchise.

In 1946, Italian immigrant Danny Biasone sent a $5,000 check to the National Basketball League offices in Chicago, and the Syracuse Nationals became the largely Midwest-based league's easternmost team, based in the upstate New York city of Syracuse. The Syracuse Nationals began to play in the NBL in the same year professional basketball was finally gaining some legitimacy with the rival Basketball Association of America that was based in large cities like New York and Philadelphia. Playing largely against teams based in small Midwestern towns, the Nationals put together a 21–23 record, finishing in 4th place. In the playoffs, the Nats were beaten by the fellow upstate neighbor Rochester Royals in 4 games.

In their second season, 1947–48, the Nationals struggled to 5th place with a 24–36 record. Still, the team made the playoffs, where they were swept by the Anderson Duffey Packers in 3 games.

Before the 1948–49 season, four teams left the NBL for the BAA as the foundation for a merger was laid. Staying in the NBL, the Nationals signed Al Cervi to be a player coach as Dolph Schayes made his professional debut, leading the Nats to their first winning record: 40–23. In the playoffs, the Nationals made quick work of the Hammond Calumet Buccaneers, winning the series in two straight games. However, in the semifinals the Nats fell to the Anderson Duffey Packers for the second straight season in four games. In 1949, when the NBL and the Basketball Association of America merged into the NBA, the Nationals were one of seven NBL teams that were brought into the NBA.

=== Early NBA years: 1949–1963 ===
The Nationals were an instant success in the NBA, winning the Eastern Division in the 1949–1950 season, with a league-best record of 51–13. In the playoffs, the Nationals swept the Philadelphia Warriors in 2 games, then beat big-city rival New York Knickerbockers in a three-game Eastern Finals. In the NBA Finals, the Nationals faced fellow NBL alums the Minneapolis Lakers. In Game 1, the Nats lost just their second home game of the season 68–66. The Nats fell behind 3 games to 1 before losing the series in 6.

Several teams left the NBA for the National Professional Basketball League before the 1950–1951 season, but the Nationals decided to stay put. In their second NBA season, the Nationals played mediocre basketball, finishing in 4th place with a record of 32–34. However, in the playoffs the Nats stunned the 1st place Philadelphia Warriors in 2 straight, taking Game 1 on the road in overtime 91–89. In the Eastern Finals the Nationals were beaten by the New York Knickerbockers in a hard-fought 5-game series, losing the finale by just 2 points.

Al Cervi, playing less and coaching more, emphasized a patient offense and a scrappy defense, which led the league in the 1951–1952 season by yielding a stingy 79.5 points per game as the Nationals won the Eastern Division with a solid 40–26 record. In the playoffs the Nats knocked off the Philadelphia Warriors again in a 3-game series. In the Eastern Finals the Nats fell to the New York Knickerbockers again, dropping the series in 4 games.

The Nationals would finish in 2nd place in a hard-fought 3-way battle for first place in the Eastern Division for the 1952–1953 season, with a record of 47–24. In the playoffs they dropped Game 1 to the Boston Celtics at home, 87–81. Needing a win in Boston to keep their hopes alive, the Nationals lost in quadruple OT 111–105, in what remains the longest playoff game in NBA history.

The Nationals acquired Alex Groza and Ralph Beard as the Indianapolis Olympians folded, leaving the NBA with just 9 teams for the 1953–1954 season. Once again the Nationals battled for the Division title, but fell 2 games short with a 42–30 record. In the playoffs, the Nats wonall 4 games of a round-robin tournament involving the 3 playoff teams from the East. In the Eastern Finals, the Nats beat the Boston Celtics in 2 straight games, but lost to the Minneapolis Lakers in a hard-fought 7-game series where the 2 teams alternated wins throughout.

With the NBA struggling financially and down to just 8 teams, Nationals owner during the 1954–1955 season Danny Biasone suggested the league limit the amount of time taken for a shot, thus speeding up a game that often ended with long periods of teams just holding the ball and playing keep away. Biasone and Nats general manager Leo Ferris calculated that a 24-second shot clock would allow at least 30 shots per quarter. The shot clock was an instant success; scoring per game rose an average of 14 points. In the first season of the shot clock, the Nats took first place in the East with a 43–29 record. After a first-round bye, the Nats beat the Boston Celtics in 4 games to reach the NBA Finals for the 2nd straight season. In the finals, the Nats got off to a fast start (led by forward Dolph Schayes) and took the first 2 games at home against the Fort Wayne Pistons. As the series moved to Fort Wayne, the Pistons returned to life, taking all 3 games to take a 3–2 series lead. Back in Syracuse for Game 6 on the Nats kept championship hopes alive by beating the Pistons 109–104 to force a 7th game at home. Game 7 was tight; George King sank a free throw to give the Nats a 92–91 lead in the final seconds, then stole an inbound pass to clinch the NBA Championship.

The Nationals struggled during the 1955–1956 season, needing a tiebreaker over the New York Knickerbockers to avoid finishing in last place and make the playoffs with a 35–37 record. In the playoffs, the Nats stunned the Boston Celtics, winning the first round series in 3 games by taking the final 2 games. In the Eastern Finals, the Nationals pushed the Philadelphia Warriors to a decisive 5th game, but ended their reign as champions with a 109–104 loss.

The Nationals started the 1956–1957 season slowly. Coach Al Cervi was fired and replaced by Paul Seymour, who led the Nats to rebound and finish in 2nd place with a record of 38–34. In the playoffs, the Nats knocked off the defending champion Philadelphia Warriors in two, but were then swept in three by the eventual champions, the Boston Celtics.

Fort Wayne and Rochester had moved on to Detroit and Cincinnati for the 1957–1958 season, leaving the Syracuse Nationals as the last small-town team in the big-city NBA. Still, the Nats finished in 2nd place with a 41–31 record. In the playoffs, the Nationals fell in the first round, a 3-game series against the Philadelphia Warriors.

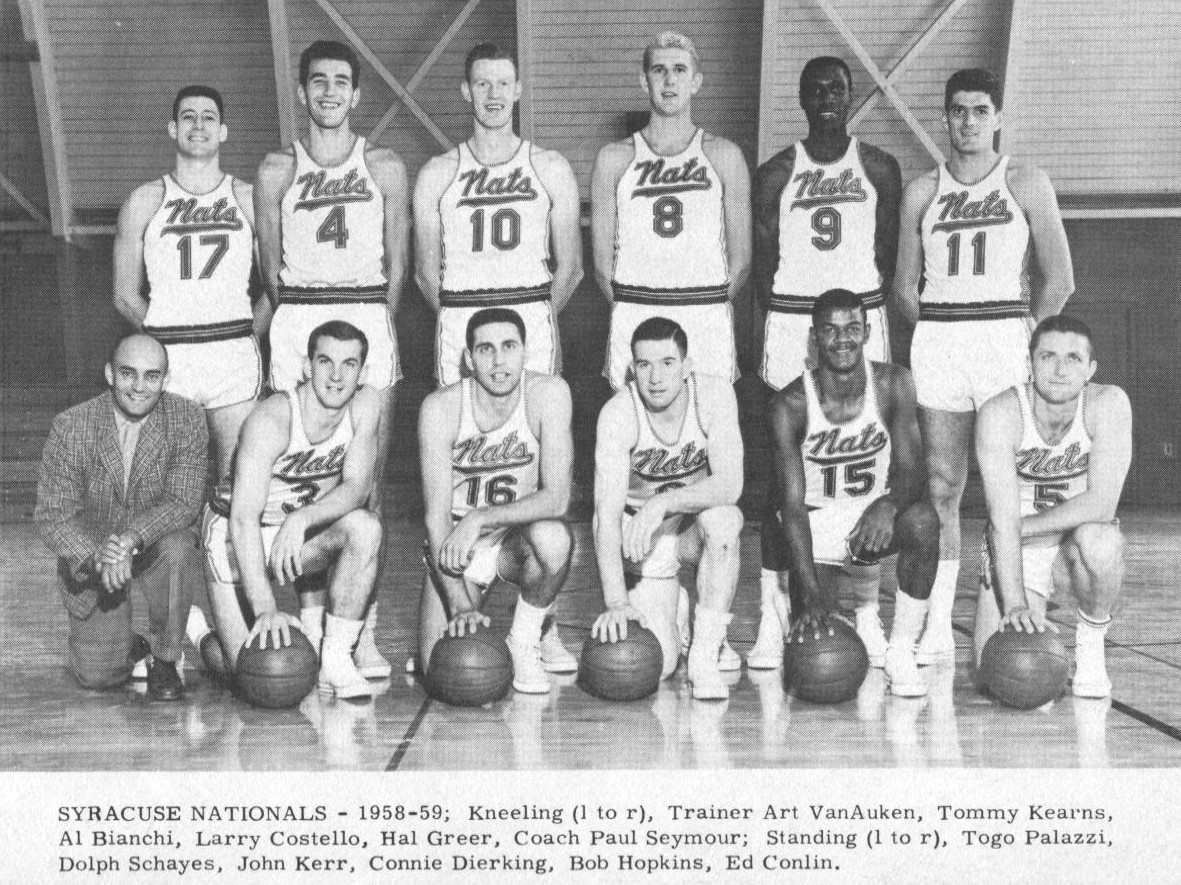
The 1958–59 Syracuse Nationals

Despite a mediocre 35–37 record for the 1958–1959 season, the Nationals finished in 3rd place. In the playoffs, the Nationals swept the New York Knickerbockers in 2 to reach the Eastern Finals, where they played hard against the eventual champion Boston Celtics before falling by 5 points in Game 7.

Playing in a league now dominated by superstars like Bill Russell of the Boston Celtics, Wilt Chamberlain of the Philadelphia Warriors and Bob Pettit of the St. Louis Hawks, the Nationals posted a solid 45–30 record in the 1959–1960 regular season, good for 3rd place. In the playoffs, the Nats swept Chamberlain and the Warriors in five, then lost to Russell and the Celtics 3–1 in the Eastern Division finals.

When the Lakers moved from Minneapolis to Los Angeles before the 1960–1961 season, the Syracuse Nationals became the last old NBL team still playing in their original city in the NBA. The Nationals would make the playoffs again by finishing in 3rd place with a 38–41 record. In the playoffs, the Nationals stunned the Philadelphia Warriors in 3 straight games, but in the Eastern Finals were knocked off once again by the eventual champion Boston Celtics in 5 games.

Dolph Schayes missed 24 games during the 1961–1962 season and failed to lead the team in scoring for the first time in 14 years, as Hal Greer leds the way with 22.8 ppg. The Nats finished in 3rd place again with a 41–39 record. In the playoffs, the Nats dropped their first 2 games to the Philadelphia Warriors on the road. Facing elimination, the Nats won the next 2 games to force a 5th game in Philadelphia, which they lost, 121–104.

The aging Nationals were expected to fade in the 1962–1963 season, but the scrappy play of Johnny Kerr led them to a 2nd-place finish and a record of 48–32. In the playoffs, the Nationals got off to a 2-1 series lead over the Cincinnati Royals, but then lost 2 straight, including the decisive 5th game at home in overtime, 131–127.

== Move to Philadelphia ==
The playoff overtime loss on March 26, 1963, would prove to be the last game for the Syracuse Nationals, as investors Irv Kosloff and Ike Richman purchased the team from Danny Biasone moving the team to Philadelphia, filling the void left by the Warriors. While many early NBA teams had been based in medium-sized cities, Syracuse was the last such city left in the league by 1963. By then, however, it was apparent that central New York was no longer large enough to support the Nats. The NBA thus returned to Philadelphia one year after the Warriors had left for San Francisco. A contest was held to decide on a new name for the team. The winning name, chosen by Walter Stalberg, was the "76ers". Newspaper writers liked the name because it was easily shortened to "Sixers" in headlines. The shorter name was quickly accepted by the team for marketing purposes, and for most of the last 60 years "76ers" and "Sixers" have been officially interchangeable.

For their first four years in Philadelphia, the 76ers played mostly at the Philadelphia Arena and Civic Center-Convention Hall, with an occasional game at The Palestra at the University of Pennsylvania. Schayes was named head coach, a post he held for four years (the first as player-coach).

== 1964–1967: The Wilt Chamberlain era ==
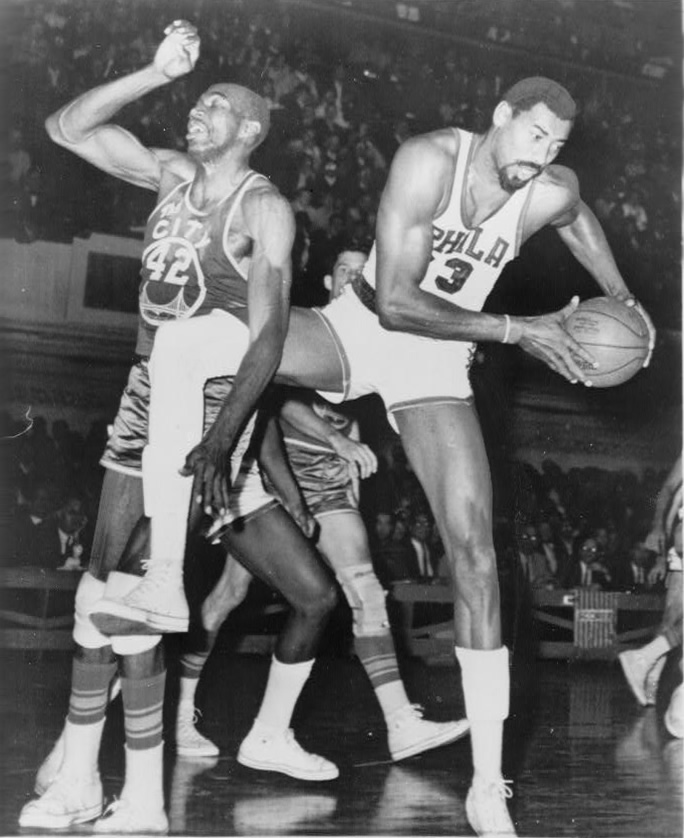
Wilt Chamberlain joined the Sixers in 1965, and in his third season (1967), he led the team to the NBA title.

In the 1964–65 season, the 76ers acquired the legendary Wilt Chamberlain from the Warriors; Chamberlain had been a high school legend at Overbrook High School in Philadelphia and began his career with the Warriors while they still played in Philadelphia. The 76ers would push the Celtics to seven games in the semifinals, with the 76ers trailing 110–109 in Game 7. After Hal Greer's pass was stolen by John Havlicek—an infamous blow to 76ers fans, rubbed in by fabled Celtics announcer Johnny Most when he yelled into the microphone "Havlicek stole the ball!"—the Celtics went on to beat the Los Angeles Lakers and win the NBA Championship.

On December 3, 1965, amid a game at the Boston Garden, co-owner Ike Richman suffered a heart attack and died courtside. The 76ers finished the 1965–66 season with the best record in the NBA, behind Chamberlain's league leading 33.5 points per game and 24.6 rebounds per game. They were quickly dispatched, however, by the Celtics in five games during the Eastern Division Finals.

=== 1966–67 season ===
Led by head coach Alex Hannum, the 76ers had a dream season as they started 46–4, en route to a record of 68–13, the best record in league history at the time. Chamberlain set a then-NBA-record with his league-leading 0.683 field goal percentage, and again led the NBA in rebounding with 24.2 boards per game. Chamberlain, Billy Cunningham, and Hal Greer, along with all-stars Chet Walker, Lucious Jackson and Wali Jones led the team to the semifinals. This time the 76ers beat the Celtics in five games. In Game Five of that series, as the 76ers went to victory and the NBA Finals, Philadelphia fans chanted "Boston is dead!"—a symbol that the Celts' eight-year reign as NBA champion had ended. The Finals were almost anticlimactic, with the Sixers ousting the Warriors in six games to give them their second NBA Championship. The 1966–67 Sixers were voted the best team in league history during the NBA's 35th anniversary celebration.

== 1967–1976: Fall of the 76ers ==
In the 1967–68 season, with a new home court in the form of The Spectrum to defend their championship, the 76ers had the NBA's best record for the third consecutive season. Chamberlain won his third consecutive MVP award after leading the NBA in rebounds, assists, and field goal percentage. Greer and Chamberlain both averaged over 24 points per game, and once again the 76ers made it back to the NBA Playoffs. In a rematch of the previous year's semifinals, the 76ers held a 3–1 series lead over the Celtics, before the Celtics staged a dramatic comeback to beat the Sixers in seven games.

At the end of the season, the 76ers dealt Chamberlain to the Los Angeles Lakers for Archie Clark, Darrall Imhoff and Jerry Chambers. At the time, the trade appeared to make some sense from the Sixers' perspective. Chamberlain was making noises about jumping to the American Basketball Association, and GM Jack Ramsay didn't want to risk letting Chamberlain walk away for nothing. Nonetheless, the Sixers didn't get nearly enough in return. The man who was in a position to take over as the center, Lucious Jackson, suffered a severe injury in 1969 and was never the same player after that. The Chamberlain trade sent the Sixers into a freefall, which Ramsay accelerated by subsequent divestiture of All Star forward Chet Walker to the Chicago Bulls.

While the rapidly declining 76ers continued to contend for the next three seasons, they never got past the second round. In 1971–72—only five years after winning the title—the 76ers finished 30–52 and missed postseason play for the first time in franchise history.

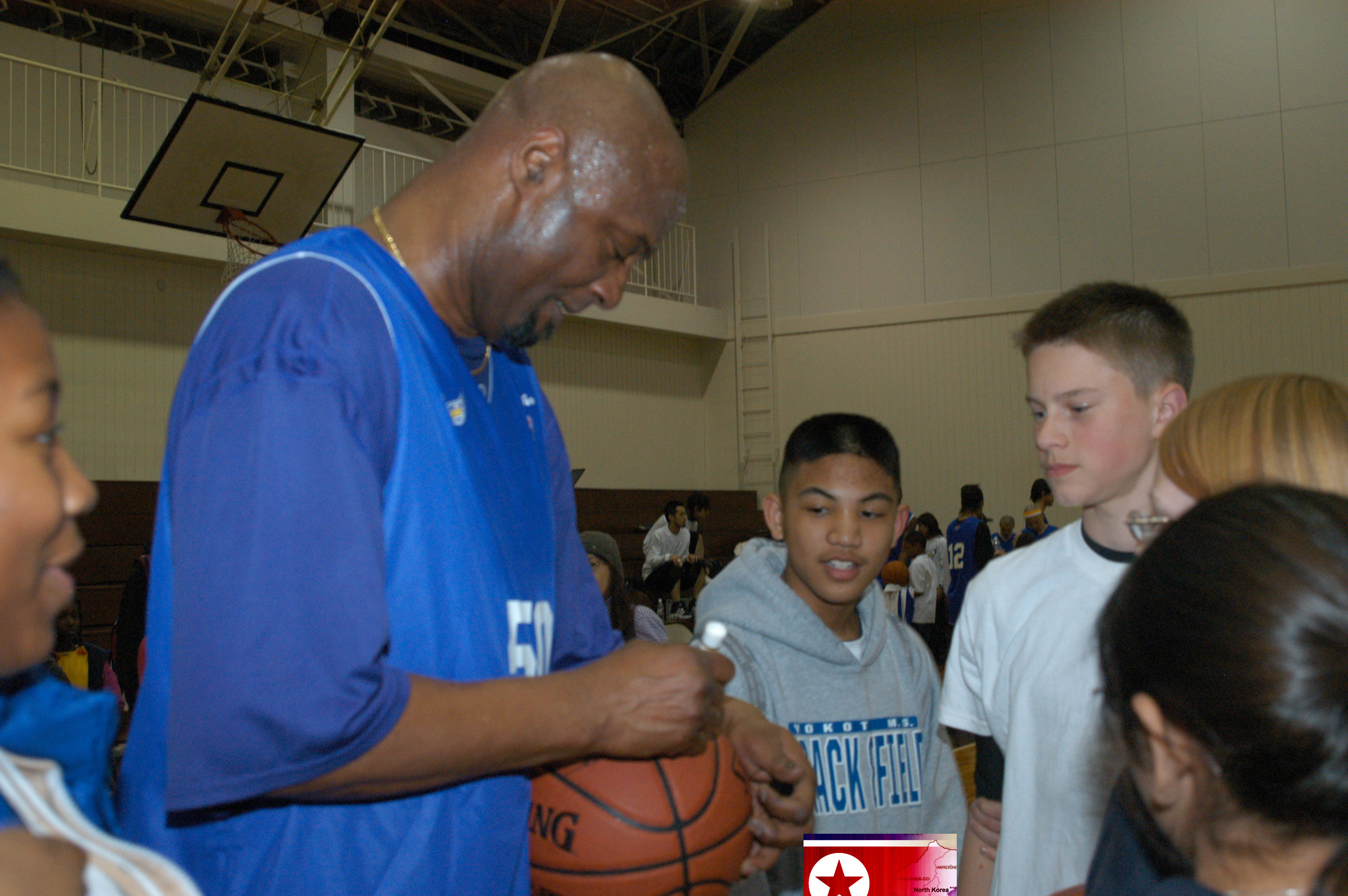
Philadelphia-born Joe Bryant was a first round draft pick who played for the 76ers between 1975 and 1979.

The bottom fell out in the 1972–73 season. Ramsay left for the expansion Buffalo Braves, but the Sixers had trouble finding a replacement; Al McGuire and Adolph Rupp turned them down. Kosloff was so desperate for a replacement that he took out an ad in The Philadelphia Inquirer. It was answered by Roy Rubin, longtime head coach at Long Island University. For all intents and purposes, the season ended when Cunningham bolted to the ABA on the same day Rubin was introduced as head coach. This left the Sixers with a roster of Greer–the last former Syracuse National still on the team, and the only holdover from the 1967 champions–and little else. The 76ers lost their first 15 games of the season, and a few months later set a then-record 20-game losing streak in a single season. Their record after the 20-game losing streak was 4–58, and the team at that point had just lost 34 of 35 games. The 76ers finished the season with a 9–73 record, leading the skeptical Philadelphia press to call them the "Nine and 73-ers". Rubin was fired after 51 games and a 4–47 record; it would be his only NBA coaching job. He was succeeded by player-coach Kevin Loughery, who went 5-26 the rest of the way. The 76ers finished an NBA-record 59 games behind the Atlantic Division champion Boston Celtics. The nine wins by the 1972–73 squad are the fourth fewest in NBA history, and remains the fewest for a full 82-game season. The 73 losses, although threatened several times, remain the all-time low-water mark for any NBA franchise. The 76ers' 0.110 winning percentage was a record worst at the time, and is still the second lowest in NBA history. This record was broken by the 2011–2012 Charlotte Bobcats, who finished 7-59 (.106) in a season shortened due to a lockout. Only six years after fielding one of the best teams in NBA history, the Sixers fielded what is widely considered to be the worst team ever to take the court in NBA history.

The next year, the 76ers would hire Gene Shue as their head coach and they slowly came back. In the 1975–76 season, the 76ers acquired George McGinnis from the Indiana Pacers of the ABA (after the Knicks tried to sign him, not knowing that the 76ers owned his rights). With him, the 76ers were back in the playoffs after a five-year absence, and even though they lost to the Buffalo Braves in three games, a "Doctor" would come along and get the team healthy enough to stay in perennial contention. During this period, however, one last personnel misjudgment had effects when the team used the fifth pick overall in the 1975 draft to select Darryl Dawkins directly from high school. The immensely talented and physically imposing Dawkins seldom, if ever, lived up to his great potential in part because of perpetual adolescence.

== 1976–1987: The Julius Erving era ==
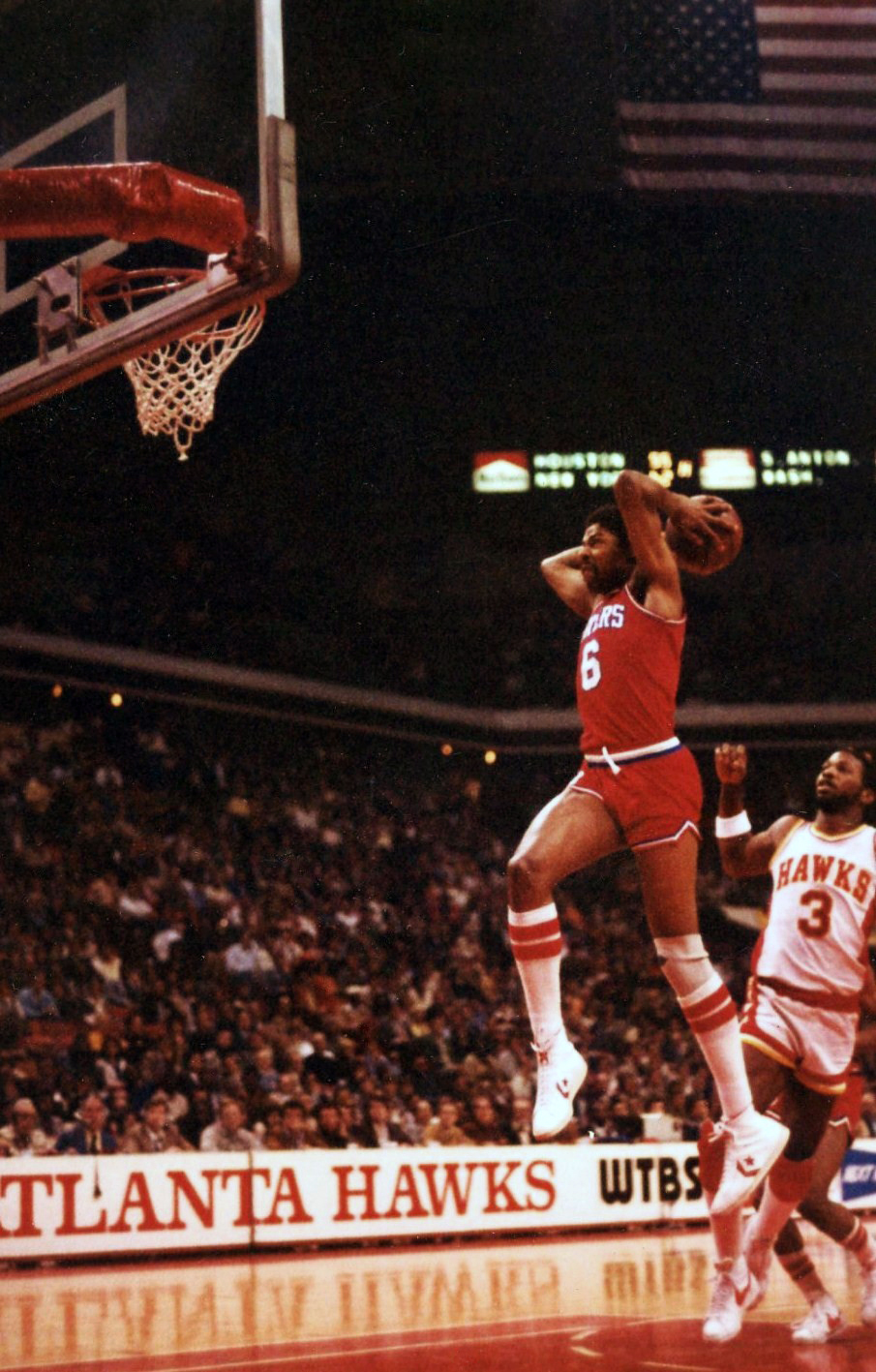
Julius Erving played 11 seasons with the 76ers (1976–87), and played in four NBA Finals, ultimately winning in 1983.

The Sixers finally came back in 1976–77, in large part due to a byproduct of the ABA–NBA merger. The ABA's last champions, the New York Nets, were facing having to pay almost $5 million to the Knicks for "invading" the New York area on top of the $3.2 million expansion fee for joining the NBA. When the Sixers offered to buy the contract of the Nets' franchise player, Julius Erving, for $3 million—roughly the cost of NBA membership—the Nets had little choice but to accept. A few months before that trade, Kosloff had sold the Sixers to local philanthropist Fitz Eugene Dixon Jr., grandson of George Dunton Widener and heir to the Widener fortune.

Led by Erving, the 76ers began an exciting ride for the fans of Philadelphia, beating their long-time rival from Boston in a seven-game playoff to advance to the Eastern Conference Finals. There, they defeated the Houston Rockets, led by future 76er Moses Malone, in six games to advance to the NBA Finals. In the Finals, they sprinted to a 2–0 series lead over the Bill Walton-led Portland Trail Blazers—who was coached by former Sixers coach/general manager Jack Ramsay—only to drop the next four games in a row to give the Blazers the title.

That led to the 1977–78 motto of "We owe you one", which would ultimately backfire when they lost in the conference finals that season to the Washington Bullets, who went on to win the NBA championship. In the next four seasons, the 76ers would fall short of the NBA Championship, even after Shue handed the coaching reins to former great Billy Cunningham. In the 1980 NBA Finals against the Los Angeles Lakers, they lost, four games to two. In Game Six, rookie Magic Johnson played center for the Lakers in place of Kareem Abdul-Jabbar (who was out because of a sprained ankle sustained in Game Five) and scored 42 points. In the 1981 Eastern Conference Finals, the 76ers opened a 3–1 series lead over the Celtics only to see Boston come back and win the series in seven games. The following season, the 76ers again faced the Celtics in the Eastern Conference Finals, and again jumped to a 3–1 series lead only to see Boston forge a 3–3 series tie. The 76ers were given little chance of winning as they faced the Celtics in Game Seven at Boston Garden. This time, they played angrily but inspired basketball, pulling away to a 120–106 victory. In the game's closing moments, the Boston Garden fans began chanting "Beat L.A., Beat L.A.", an incredible moment in basketball history, wherein, for seemingly the first time the opposing team's fans (Boston), realizing their team would lose the playoff series to a hated opponent (Philadelphia), nonetheless during the very game their team (Boston) was losing to the opponent (Philadelphia), openly wished that opponent (Philadelphia) good luck in the next round against a more hated opponent (Los Angeles). Although they lost in the NBA Finals, the 76ers began the 1982–83 season with great momentum. All they needed now was Moses to lead them to the promised land of the NBA championship.

=== 1982–83 season ===
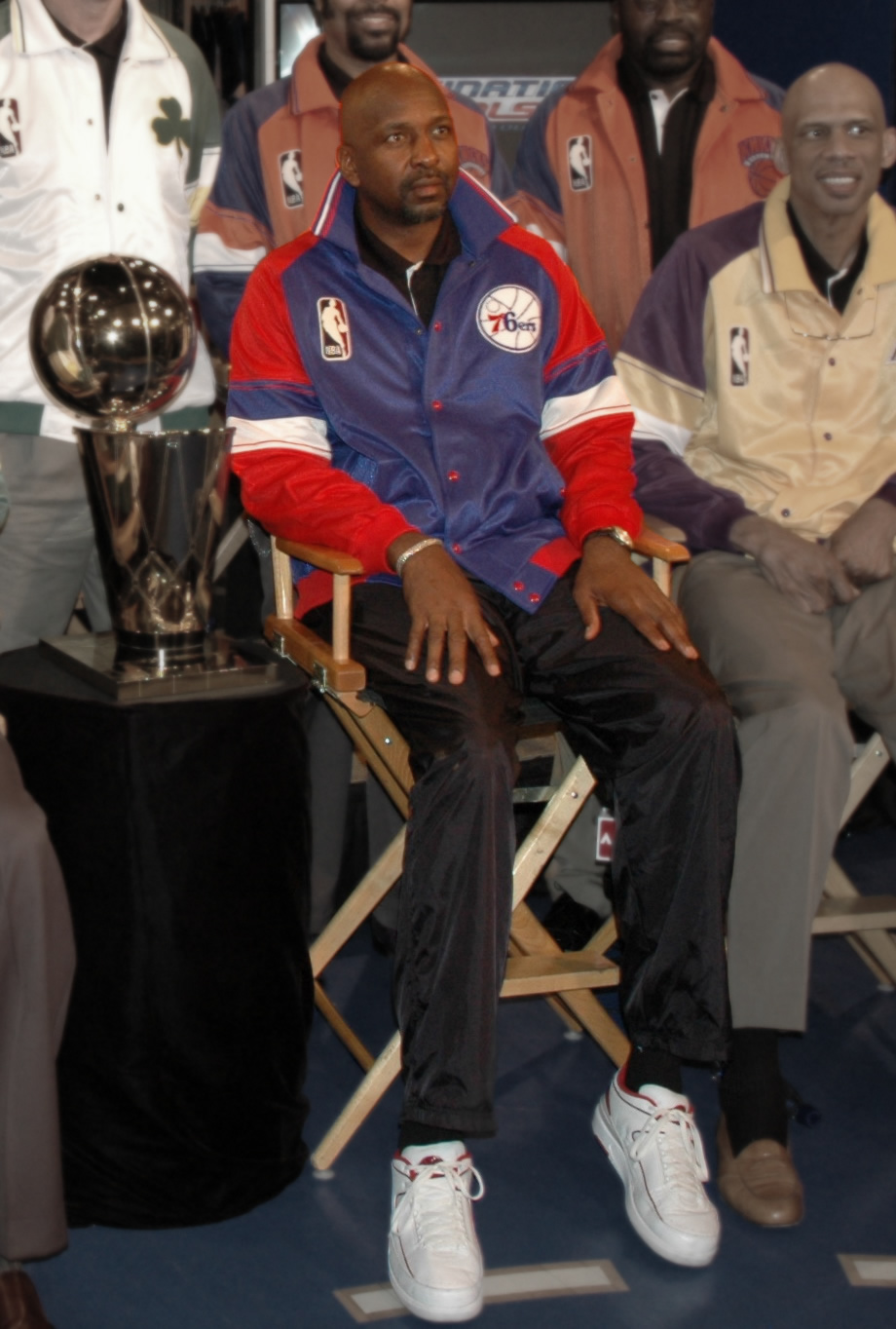
Moses Malone won MVP honors in 1983, the same year he led the 76ers to their first title in 16 years.

Harold Katz bought the 76ers from Dixon in 1981. On his watch, the final piece of the championship puzzle was completed before the 1982–83 season when they acquired center Moses Malone from the Houston Rockets. Led by Hall of Famer Julius Erving and All-Stars Maurice Cheeks, Andrew Toney, and Bobby Jones they dominated the regular season, winning 65 games in what is still the second most winning year in franchise history. Malone was named League MVP, and when reporters asked how the playoffs would run, he answered, "four, four, four"—in other words, saying that the 76ers needed to win four games in each of the 3 rounds. The media misinterpreted this and assumed Moses was predicting that the 76ers would sweep all three rounds to win the title, with a minimum 12 games. Malone's accent made his boast sound like "fo', fo', fo'."

However, the 76ers backed up Malone's boast. They made a mockery of the Eastern Conference playoffs, first sweeping the New York Knicks and then beating the Milwaukee Bucks in five games. The 76ers went on to win their third NBA championship (and second in Philadelphia) with a four-game sweep of the Los Angeles Lakers, who had defeated them the season before. Malone was named the playoffs' MVP. The 76ers didn't quite fulfill Malone's prediction, as their run was actually "fo', fi', fo" ("four, five, four") – a loss to the Bucks in game four of the Eastern finals being the only blemish on their playoff run. Nonetheless, their 12–1 playoff record is tied for the fewest losses in league history with the 2000–2001 Lakers, who went 15–1 en route to the NBA Title, coincidentally beating the 76ers in the Finals (after suffering their only defeat that postseason in Game 1), and the 2016-17 Golden State Warriors, who finished the 2017 NBA postseason 16–1. The Philadelphia-based group Pieces Of A Dream had a minor hit in 1983 with the R&B song "Fo-Fi-Fo", which title was prompted by Malone's quip. This also marked the last championship in Philadelphia until the Phillies won the 2008 World Series.

=== Arrival of Charles Barkley ===
After a disappointing 1983–84 season, which ended with a five-game loss to the upstart New Jersey Nets in the first round of the playoffs, Charles Barkley arrived in Philadelphia for the 1984–85 season. For the next eight seasons, Barkley brought delight to the Philadelphia fans thanks to his humorous and sometimes controversial ways. The Sixers returned to the Eastern Conference Finals in Barkley's rookie season, but lost to the Boston Celtics in five games. As it turned out, they would never again advance as far during Barkley's tenure in Philadelphia. After the '84-85 season, Matt Guokas replaced Billy Cunningham as head coach. Guokas led the 76ers to a 54–28 record and the second round of the playoffs in 1985–86, where they were defeated by the Milwaukee Bucks in seven games.

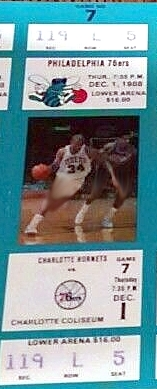
A ticket for a 1988–89 game between the 76ers and the Hornets.

On June 16, 1986, Katz made two of the most controversial and highly criticized personnel moves in franchise history, trading Moses Malone to Washington and the first overall pick in the 1986 NBA draft (which had been obtained from the San Diego Clippers in a 1979 trade for Joe Bryant) to the Cleveland Cavaliers. In return, the 76ers received Roy Hinson, Jeff Ruland, and Cliff Robinson, none of whom played more than three seasons with the team. Cleveland, meanwhile, turned their acquired pick into future All-Star Brad Daugherty.

On the night of the 1986–87 season opener, Julius Erving announced he would retire after the season, which was subsequently filled with tributes in each arena the Sixers visited. On the court, the team suffered through an injury-plagued campaign, but still managed to make the playoffs with a 45–37 record. Their season would end at the hands of the Bucks again, this time in a best-of-five first round series that went the distance.

== 1987–1992: The Charles Barkley era ==
In 1987–88, with the team's record at 20–23, Guokas was fired and replaced by an assistant Jim Lynam. Lynam finished the season 16–23, to bring Philadelphia's overall mark to 36–46. For the first time since the 1974–75 season, the Sixers failed to reach the playoffs. Philadelphia selected Charles Smith with its first pick (third overall) in the 1988 NBA draft, then traded his rights to the Los Angeles Clippers for their first pick (sixth overall), Hersey Hawkins. In five seasons with the 76ers, Hawkins would average 19 points per game, and was the team's all-time leader in three-point field goals attempted and made when he was traded to the Charlotte Hornets for Dana Barros, Sidney Green and draft picks in 1993.

In 1988–89, Philadelphia returned to the playoffs after a one-year absence, but was swept in the first round by the New York Knicks. In 1989–90, Barkley finished second in the league's MVP voting, as the Sixers won the Atlantic Division title with a 53–29 record. After defeating Cleveland in the first round of the playoffs, Philadelphia faced Michael Jordan and the Chicago Bulls in the second round. The 76ers fell to the Chicago Bulls in five games, and would do the same in 1991 after sweeping the Bucks in the first round. In 1991–92, the 76ers went 35-47 and missed the playoffs for just the second time during Barkley's eight seasons in Philadelphia. On June 17, 1992, Barkley was traded to the Phoenix Suns for Jeff Hornacek, Tim Perry, and Andrew Lang, a deal that was met with harsh criticism.

== 1992–1996: The dark ages ==
Lynam relinquished his head coaching position to become general manager after the 1991–92 season, and hired Doug Moe to fill the vacancy. Moe's tenure lasted just 56 games, with the Sixers posting a 19–37 record. Popular former player and longtime assistant coach Fred Carter succeeded Moe as head coach in March 1993, but could only manage a 32–76 record at the helm. After the 1993–94 season, the 76ers hired John Lucas in the dual role of the head coach and general manager. The enthusiastic Lucas had been successful as a head coach for the San Antonio Spurs, and Philadelphia hoped he could breathe new life into the 76ers. It proved disastrous, as the team went 42–122 in its two seasons under Lucas. The acquisition of unproductive free agents such as Scott Williams and Charles Shackleford, players at the end of their careers such as LaSalle Thompson, Orlando Woolridge, and Scott Skiles along with stunningly unwise high draft picks such as Shawn Bradley and Sharone Wright were also factors in the team's decline. In fact, Wright would only play four seasons in the NBA while Temple product Eddie Jones—drafted 4 slots below Wright in 1994 by the L.A. Lakers—had 16 productive seasons as an NBA player.

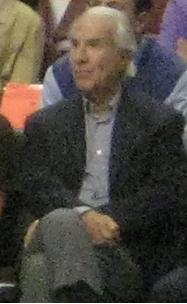
Ed Snider purchased the 76ers in 1996.

Starting with the 1990–91 season, and ending with the 1995–96 season, the 76ers had the dubious distinction of seeing their win total decrease each year. The nadir was the 1995–96 season, when they finished with an 18–64 record, the second-worst in franchise history. It was also the second-worst record in the league that year, ahead of only the expansion Vancouver Grizzlies but behind the Toronto Raptors, who were also in their inaugural season. That season would turn out to be their last in The Spectrum. Katz, unpopular among fans since the 1986 trades, sold the team to Comcast Spectacor, a consortium of Philadelphia Flyers owner Ed Snider and Comcast Corporation, at the end of the 1995–96 season. Snider had been the Sixers' landlord since gaining control of the Spectrum in 1971. Pat Croce, a former trainer for the Flyers and Sixers, took over as president.

Many 76ers fans call these years "The Dark Ages". However, after many years of misfortune, there was a bright spot. The team won the lottery for the top pick in the 1996 NBA draft. Questions remained, but with the first pick, the Sixers found their "Answer": Allen Iverson.

== 1996–2006: The Allen Iverson era ==
With new ownership, Iverson in place, and the 76ers moving into the CoreStates Center, things seemed to finally be heading in a positive direction. Croce fired Lucas as both coach and general manager. Johnny Davis was named head coach, while Brad Greenberg took over as general manager. Iverson was named Rookie of the Year, but Philadelphia's overall improvement was minimal, as they finished with a 22–60 record. Changes had to be made, and after the 1996–97 season, Davis and Greenberg were both fired and the unveiling of a new 76ers team logo and jerseys marked a new era. To replace Davis, Larry Brown was hired as head coach. Known for a defense-first approach and transforming unsuccessful teams into winners by "playing the right way", Brown faced perhaps his toughest coaching challenge. He often clashed with Iverson, but the 76ers improved to 31 wins in 1997–98. Early in the 1997–98 season, the Sixers traded Jerry Stackhouse, who had been the third overall pick in the 1995 NBA draft, to the Detroit Pistons. In exchange, Philadelphia received Aaron McKie and Theo Ratliff, defensive standouts who would have an impact on the team's resurgence. Another key figure in the team's rise, Eric Snow, was added in a trade with the Seattle SuperSonics in January 1998.

Before the 1998–99 season, the 76ers signed George Lynch and Matt Geiger, but a lengthy lockout delayed the start of the season, which was shortened to 50 games. During the season, Philadelphia acquired Tyrone Hill in a trade with Milwaukee. The team began its resurgence during this strike-shortened season, finishing with a 28–22 record and the sixth seed in the Eastern Conference playoffs, marking the first time since 1991 the team reached the postseason. In the first round, Philadelphia upset the Orlando Magic, three games to one, before being swept by the Indiana Pacers. The following season, the Sixers improved to 49–33, fifth in the East. Again, the Sixers won their first round series in four games, this time defeating the Charlotte Hornets. For the second straight year, they were defeated by Indiana in the second round, this time in six games. Though the team was moving in a positive direction, Iverson and Brown continued to clash, and their relationship deteriorated to the point where it seemed certain Iverson would be traded. A rumored trade to the Los Angeles Clippers fell through, but a complicated four-team deal that would've seen Iverson sent to Detroit was agreed upon, only to see it dissolve due to salary cap problems. When it became clear Iverson was staying in Philadelphia, he and Brown worked to patch things up, and the team would reap the benefits in 2000–01.

=== 2000–01 season ===
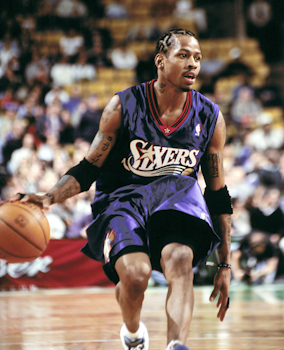
Iverson won Most Valuable Player honors in 2001 while leading the 76ers to the NBA Finals.

During the 2000–01 season, the 76ers got off to a hot start by winning their first ten games and were never seriously challenged in the Atlantic Division. Larry Brown coached the Eastern Conference All-Stars, and Allen Iverson was named MVP of the All-Star Game. Shortly before the All-Star break, Theo Ratliff was lost for the season with a wrist injury, one that would later prove to be devastating to his future career. Despite holding a 41–14 record and a comfortable lead atop both the Atlantic Division and Eastern Conference standings at the time of the February 22 trade deadline, management felt the team needed an established center to advance deep into the playoffs. On that day, Philadelphia acquired Dikembe Mutombo from the Atlanta Hawks in a deal that sent the injured Ratliff along with Nazr Mohammed, Toni Kukoč, and Pepe Sánchez to Atlanta (Sánchez was reacquired later in the season after the Hawks waived him). The 76ers went on to finish 56–26, good enough for their first Atlantic Division title since 1989–90 and the top seed in the Eastern Conference Playoffs.

In the first round of the playoffs, Philadelphia faced Indiana yet again. In Game One, the 76ers wasted an 18-point lead and lost, 79–78, when Reggie Miller hit a three-pointer in the closing seconds. Philadelphia fought back, however, and took the next three games to win the series. In the Eastern Conference Semifinals, the Sixers squared off against the Toronto Raptors and their superstar, Vince Carter. The teams alternated wins in the first four games, with Iverson scoring 54 points in Philadelphia's Game Two victory. A Game Five win (with Iverson scoring 52 in a 121–88 rout) and Game Six loss set up a decisive Game Seven, which the 76ers survived as Carter missed a long jump shot at the buzzer for an 88–87 victory that sent the Sixers to the Eastern Conference Finals against the Milwaukee Bucks. After the teams split the first two games of the series in Philadelphia, it was learned Iverson would miss Game Three due to various nagging injuries that had plagued him late in the season. Though most predicted a Milwaukee cakewalk, the 76ers kept the game close before falling, 80–74. Philadelphia seemed to gain momentum despite the loss, and they would win Games Four and Five. Milwaukee put any Sixer celebration plans on hold by building up a 33-point lead in the third quarter of Game Six, but the 76ers would make a furious fourth-quarter rally before falling 110–100. Struggling in the series up to that point, Iverson scored 26 points in the final quarter to finish with 46 on the night and appeared to have gotten a second wind. In Game Seven, the Bucks jumped out to a 34–25 second quarter advantage before seldom-used reserve Raja Bell scored 10 points to spark a 23–4 run that gave Philadelphia the lead for good. Iverson scored 44 points and the 76ers pulled away in the second half, winning by a 108–91 score to put them in the NBA Finals for the first time since 1983. As had been the case in their three previous Finals appearances, their opponent would be the Los Angeles Lakers, who had run up an 11–0 record in the first three rounds of the playoffs and were expected by many to make quick work of a worn-down 76ers squad. Because of a seemingly meaningless loss to the lowly Chicago Bulls in the regular season finale (both the Sixers and the Lakers finished with identical 56–26 records, but Los Angeles was awarded a higher seed based on tiebreakers), the NBA Finals marked the first time in the 2001 playoffs in which the 76ers had to start a series on the road.

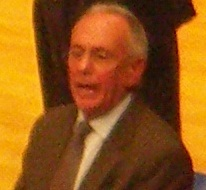
Larry Brown, who coached the 76ers 1997–2003, was named Coach of the Year in 2001.

In Game One, the Lakers jumped out to an 18–5 lead, but the 76ers stormed back to take a 15-point lead in the second half. Los Angeles rallied to force a 94–94 tie at the end of regulation before scoring the first five points of the overtime period, but the 76ers closed the game on a 13–2 run for a 107–101 triumph. Iverson hit a go-ahead three-pointer with 1:19 to go in the extra period, and followed that with a jump shot after which he infamously stepped over Tyronn Lue after making the basket. Eric Snow hit a running jump shot in the waning seconds with the shot clock expiring to clinch the stunning victory. The series would come back to Philadelphia even as Los Angeles took Game Two, 98–89. In Game Three, Shaquille O'Neal fouled out late in the fourth quarter, and the Sixers pulled to within a point with less than a minute to play after trailing by 12 earlier in the second half. Robert Horry, however, hit a clutch three-pointer in that final minute, and the Lakers prevailed, 96–91. Los Angeles wrapped up the second of what would be three consecutive NBA titles with a 100–86 win in Game Four and a 108–96 victory in Game Five.

In addition to their Atlantic Division and Eastern Conference titles, the 2000–01 76ers featured the NBA's MVP (Iverson), Coach of the Year (Brown), Defensive Player of the Year (Mutombo), and Sixth Man of the Year (Aaron McKie).

=== Departure of Larry Brown ===
The 76ers went into the 2001–02 season with high expectations, but were able to produce only a 43–39 record, sixth in the Eastern Conference. In the first round of the playoffs, Philadelphia was defeated by the Boston Celtics, three games to two. In 2002–03, the 76ers sprinted to a 15–4 start, but a 10–20 swoon left them 25–24 at the All-Star break. After the break, the 76ers caught fire, winning nine in a row at one point, and 23 of their last 33 to finish at 48–34, earning the fourth seed in the Eastern Conference playoffs. Iverson scored 55 points in the playoff opener against the New Orleans Hornets and the Sixers went on to win the series in six games. In the second round, the Detroit Pistons ended Philadelphia's playoff run in a frustrating six-game series that saw the 76ers lose twice in overtime, and once on a last-second shot in regulation. It would be nine years before the Sixers won another playoff series.

On Memorial Day, 2003, Brown abruptly resigned as head coach, taking over the reins in Detroit a few days later. Brown's Pistons would win the 2004 NBA Championship over the Los Angeles Lakers, in some ways avenging his loss to them in 2001. After being turned down by Jeff Van Gundy and Eddie Jordan, the 76ers hired Randy Ayers, an assistant under Brown, as their new head coach. Ayers lasted only 52 games and was fired with the team's record at 21–31. Chris Ford took over, but the 76ers finished the 2003–2004 season at 33–49, missing the playoffs for the first time in six years. Iverson, who was at odds with Ford throughout the interim coach's tenure, played only 48 games in a stormy, injury-plagued season.

=== Arrival of Andre Iguodala ===
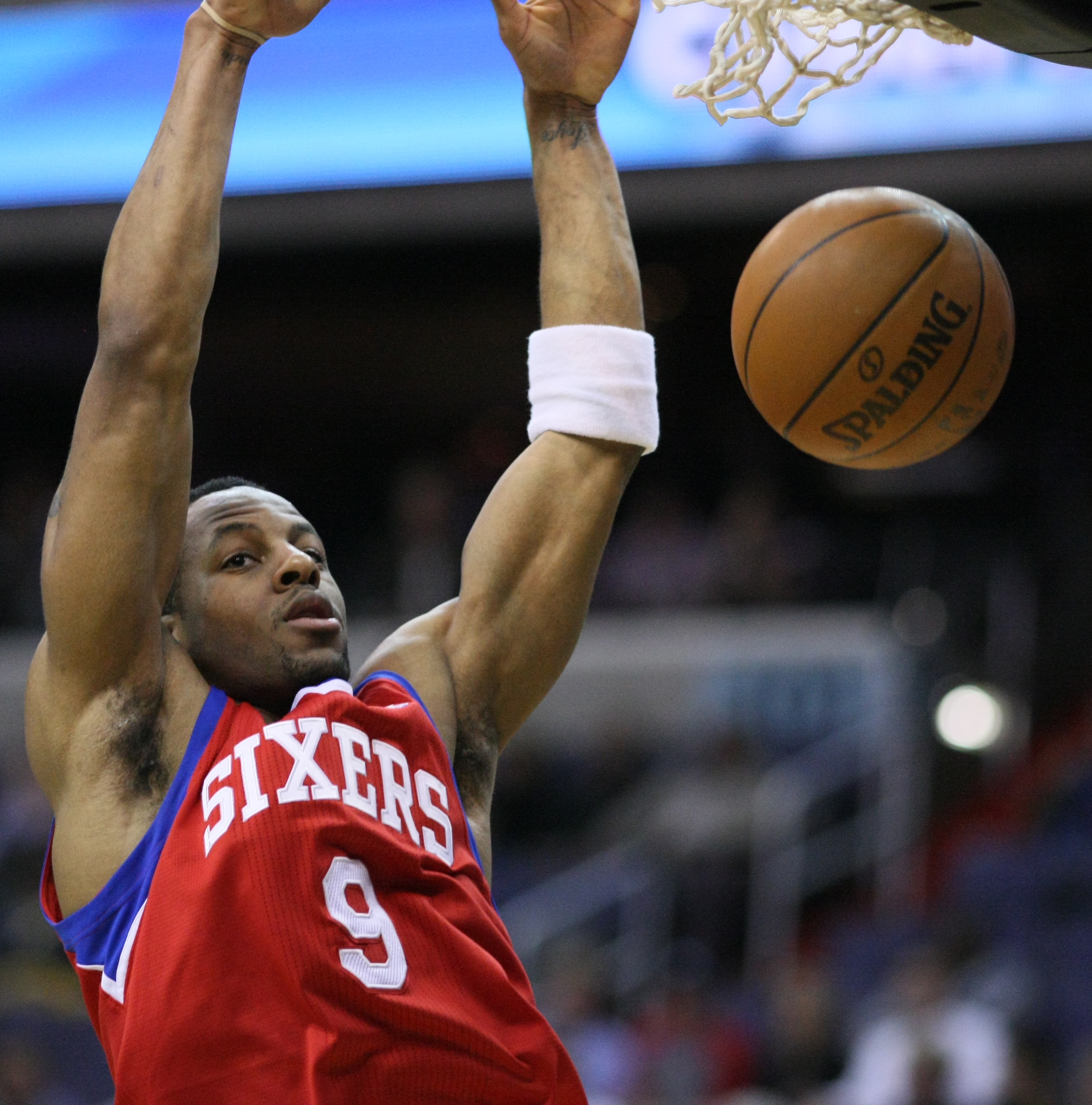
Andre Iguodala was drafted by the 76ers in 2004

For the 2004–05 season, Philadelphia native Jim O'Brien was named head coach. Iverson was moved back to point guard and flourished, having arguably his finest season. He also impressed many with his willingness to get other players involved in the offense. During this season, Philadelphia acquired Chris Webber in a trade with the Sacramento Kings, with the hopes that the team had at long last found a consistent second scoring option to compliment Iverson. Andre Iguodala, Philadelphia's first-round pick in the 2004 NBA draft, was named to the All-Rookie First Team, and the 76ers returned to the postseason with a 43–39 record. In the first round, they were defeated in five games by the defending NBA Champion Pistons, coached by Larry Brown.

Though the 2004–05 76ers exceeded many on-court expectations, there was a great deal of behind-the-scenes tension between O'Brien, his players, and the front office. Shortly after the season ended, O'Brien was fired and replaced by the popular Maurice Cheeks, who played for the team from 1978 to 1989, and was the starting point guard for the 1983 NBA Champions. However, the coaching change did not help the team's fortunes for the 2005–06 season. A 2–10 stretch in March doomed them to missing the playoffs for the second time in three years with a 38–44 record.

With the opening of the 2006–07 season, the 76ers started hot, going 3–0 for the first time since making it to the Finals five years previously. However, they stumbled through the first half of the season and couldn't quite recover, finishing 35–47, good for 3rd in the Atlantic Division, and 9th in the Eastern Conference (tied with Indiana).

On December 5, 2006, disappointed with the direction the team was headed, Allen Iverson gave the 76ers management an ultimatum: find players who will help support me or trade me. This was confirmed via an in-game interview with team owner, Ed Snider.

== 2006–2012: The Andre Iguodala era ==
On December 19, 2006, Allen Iverson, along with Ivan McFarlin, were sent to the Denver Nuggets in exchange for guard Andre Miller, forward Joe Smith, and two first-round draft picks. Then, on January 11, Sixers GM Billy King announced that the Sixers and aging forward Chris Webber had agreed to a buyout of the remainder of his contract. The Sixers would pay Webber $36 million over the next 1½ seasons, which is $7 million less than he would have been paid to play. After the buyout, the Sixers waived Webber, making him a free agent. Webber signed with the Detroit Pistons shortly thereafter.

The moves allowed the 76ers to make Iguodala the unquestioned leader of the team, and evaluate whether they saw him as a franchise player. The Sixers had started the year 3–0, then went 5–10 before Iverson left the team. They would stumble out to an eight-game losing streak with Iverson deactivated; however, they were able to finish the season on a high note, going 30-29 for the remainder of the season. They finished the year 35–47.

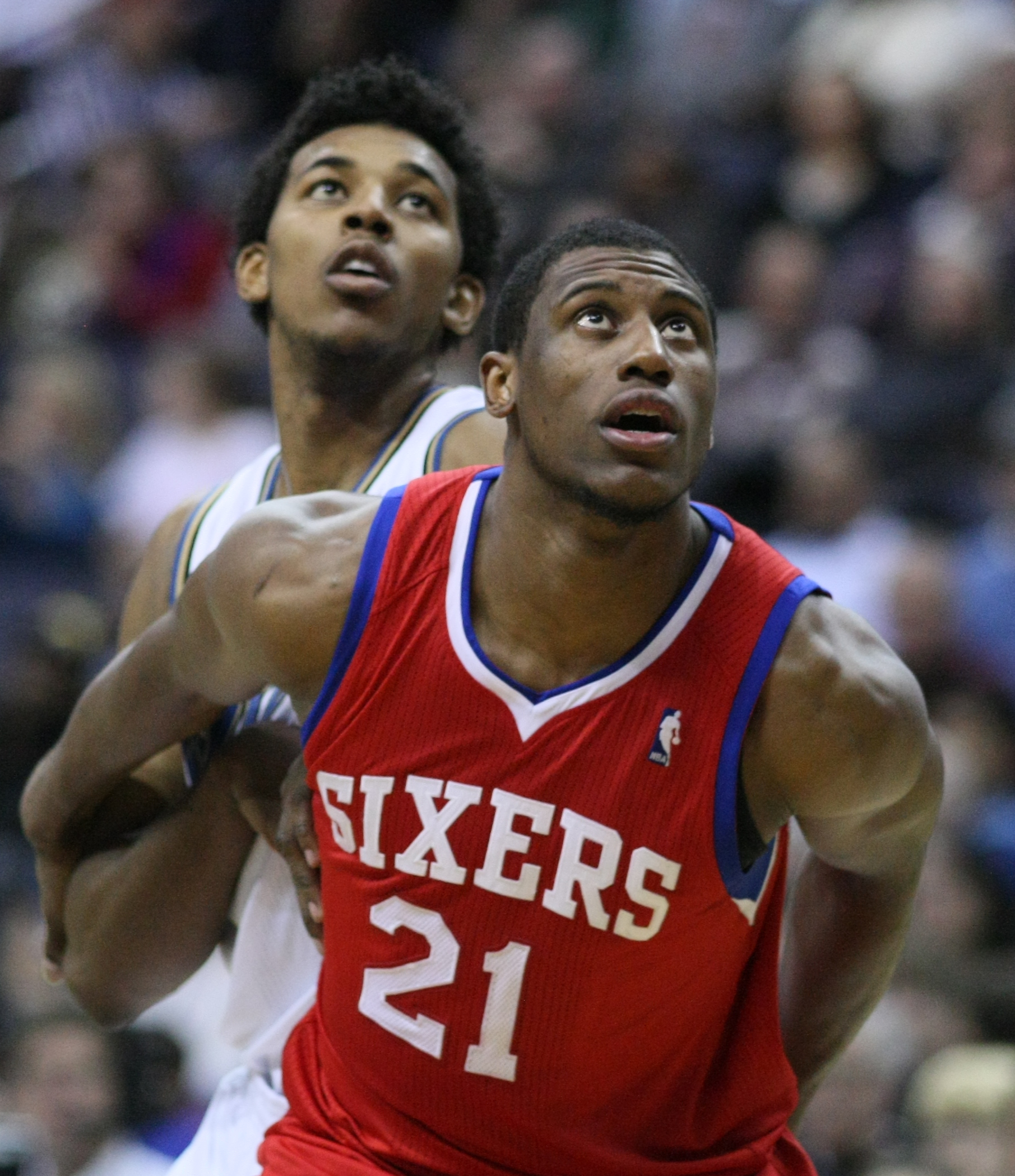
Thaddeus Young was the 76ers' first draft pick in the post-Iverson Era.

The Sixers drafted Georgia Tech SF Thaddeus Young with the 12th pick, traded with the Miami Heat for 21st pick Colorado State PF Jason Smith, traded with the Portland Trail Blazers for 42nd pick Vanderbilt SG/SF Derrick Byars, and then finally traded with the Utah Jazz for Providence PF Herbert Hill.

On December 4, 2007, the Sixers fired Billy King and replaced him with Nets GM Ed Stefanski.

With Iguodala, the Sixers clinched a playoff berth with a win over the Atlanta Hawks on April 4, 2008. It was their first postseason appearance since 2005, as well as the first in the post-Iverson era. However, they were eliminated by the Pistons in six games, with Detroit winning the series 4–2. Even with this elimination, many fans considered this to be a successful season, considering that the Sixers were 12 games under .500 in early February and went on to have a run that led them to the playoffs and a 40–42 record.

=== 2008–09 season: A "Brand" new era ===
On July 9, 2008, the 76ers signed power forward Elton Brand to a five-year, $79.795 million contract, after trading Rodney Carney and renouncing their rights to all their unrestricted free agents. Brand had originally opted out of his contract with the Los Angeles Clippers, looking to re-sign with them. But the 76ers offered him more money (he regarded their offer as the "Philly-Max") and a better chance at winning an NBA championship by playing in the Eastern Conference. This move has been the subject of controversy since there were rumors that he and Baron Davis had made a friendly agreement to play together for the Clippers. The team later signed free agent point guard Royal Ivey of the Milwaukee Bucks, Kareem Rush from the Indiana Pacers, and then signed former Sixer Theo Ratliff after Jason Smith's injury. Donyell Marshall was signed on September 2, 2008, after he stated to his agent that he wanted to go back home and end his career in Philadelphia. Rush, Ivey, Ratliff and Marshall were all paid the veteran's minimum salary, but they were to be contributors to a team on the rise. During the off-season, they also re-signed restricted free agents Louis Williams and Andre Iguodala for five years/$25 million and six years/$80 million, respectively.

However, the Sixers couldn't find the form that pushed them to the playoffs last year. The Sixers started the year with a 9–14 record before firing head coach Maurice Cheeks on December 13. Assistant GM Tony DiLeo took over and the Sixers gradually improved. They finished the season with a 41–41 record, with a 32–27 record under DiLeo. Brand's first season with the Sixers ended early with a right shoulder injury that required surgery. Despite the loss of Brand, the Sixers earned a playoff berth with a 95–90 win against the Detroit Pistons on April 4, 2009, at home.

In the first round, they faced the Orlando Magic. Three of the first four games of the series provided late-game heroics. Iguodala and Thaddeus Young made game-winning shots in Games 1 and 3, respectively, while Orlando's Hedo Türkoğlu provided the game-winner in Game 4. Just like in the previous year's playoffs, the Sixers led 2–1 after three games, but the Magic won three straight to eliminate the Sixers from the playoffs.

It was also during the season that the Sixers played one home game at their old home, the Wachovia Spectrum. The Sixers won 104–101 over the Chicago Bulls on March 13, 2009. The game was played to provide the final curtain call on the Spectrum, which was scheduled to be imploded on New Year's Eve 2009.

=== 2009–10 season: The Answer returns ===
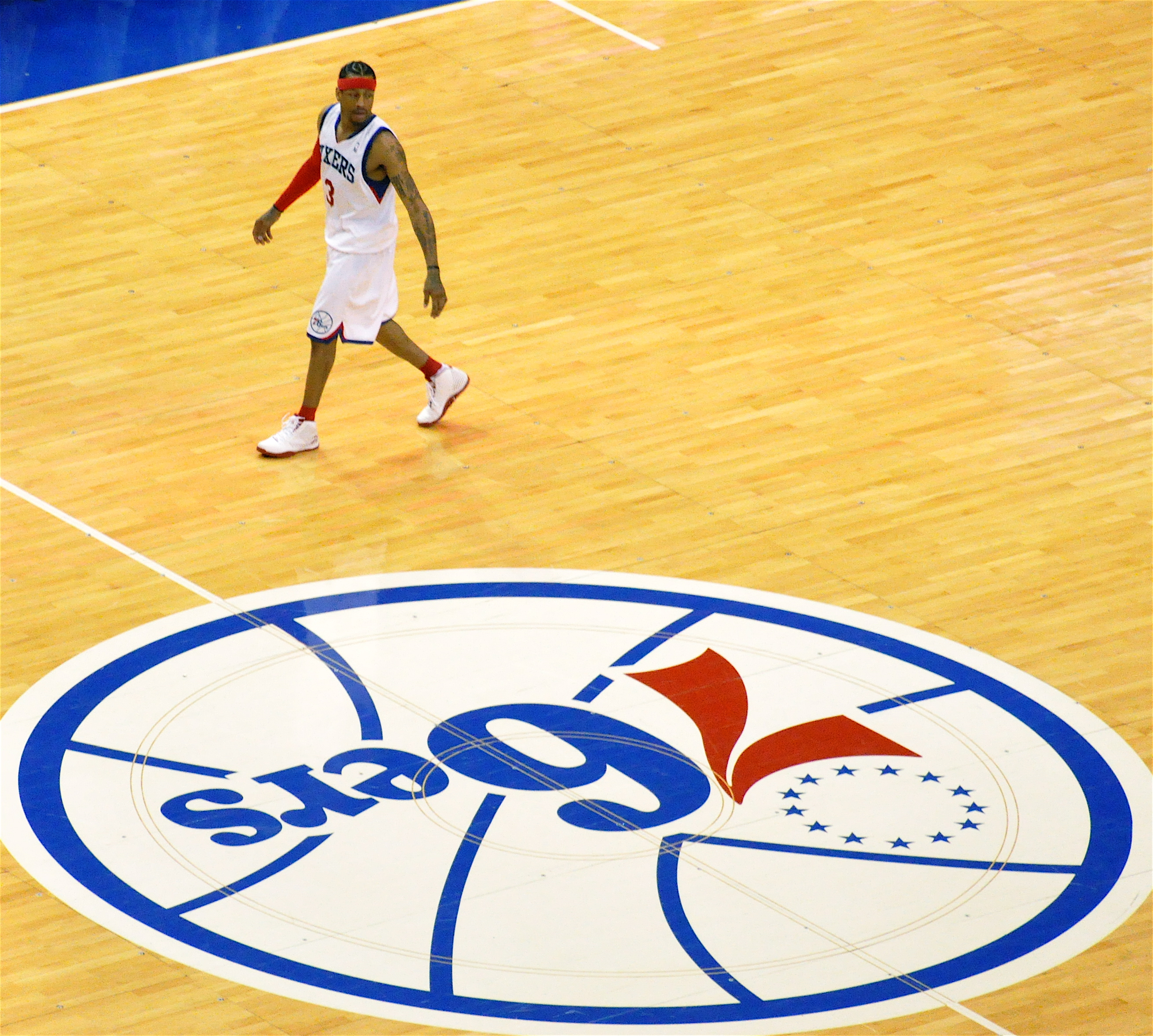
Iverson during his second stint

After the playoff loss, Tony DiLeo returned to his front-office job, creating a head coaching vacancy. Former Washington Wizards coach Eddie Jordan was introduced as the 76ers' new coach on June 1, 2009. In the 2009 off-season, the Sixers drafted UCLA point guard Jrue Holiday with the 17th pick. The Sixers also traded power forward Reggie Evans to the Toronto Raptors for a three-point specialist, small forward Jason Kapono, who had won back-to-back three-point shootouts in 2007 and 2008. The off-season also marked the return of the 1977–97 76ers logo, along with a redesigned court and new uniforms updating the 1980s ones.

On December 2, 2009, the Philadelphia 76ers announced that they had signed Allen Iverson to a one-year prorated $1.3 million non-guaranteed contract. The 76ers were 5–13 at the time and had lost Louis Williams for at least 30 games to injury. Iverson made his "re-debut" for the 76ers against the team he was traded to, the Denver Nuggets, to a thunderous ovation from the sell-out crowd, scoring 11 points, with six assists and five rebounds.

However, the euphoria that greeted Iverson's return to the 76ers faded quickly. On February 22, Iverson announced he was leaving the 76ers indefinitely to attend to his daughter's illness, and a few weeks later the 76ers announced that Iverson would not be returning for the rest of the season.

The 76ers finished the season with a record of 27–55, their first 50-loss season since 1998. Most cited the reason behind this as the players' inability to play within Eddie Jordan's Princeton offense, with several players unhappy with his system. Hours after the 76ers' last game at Orlando on April 14, the team fired Jordan after one season. He was the fourth coach to be fired after one season or less since Larry Brown left the team in 2003.

=== 2010–11 season ===
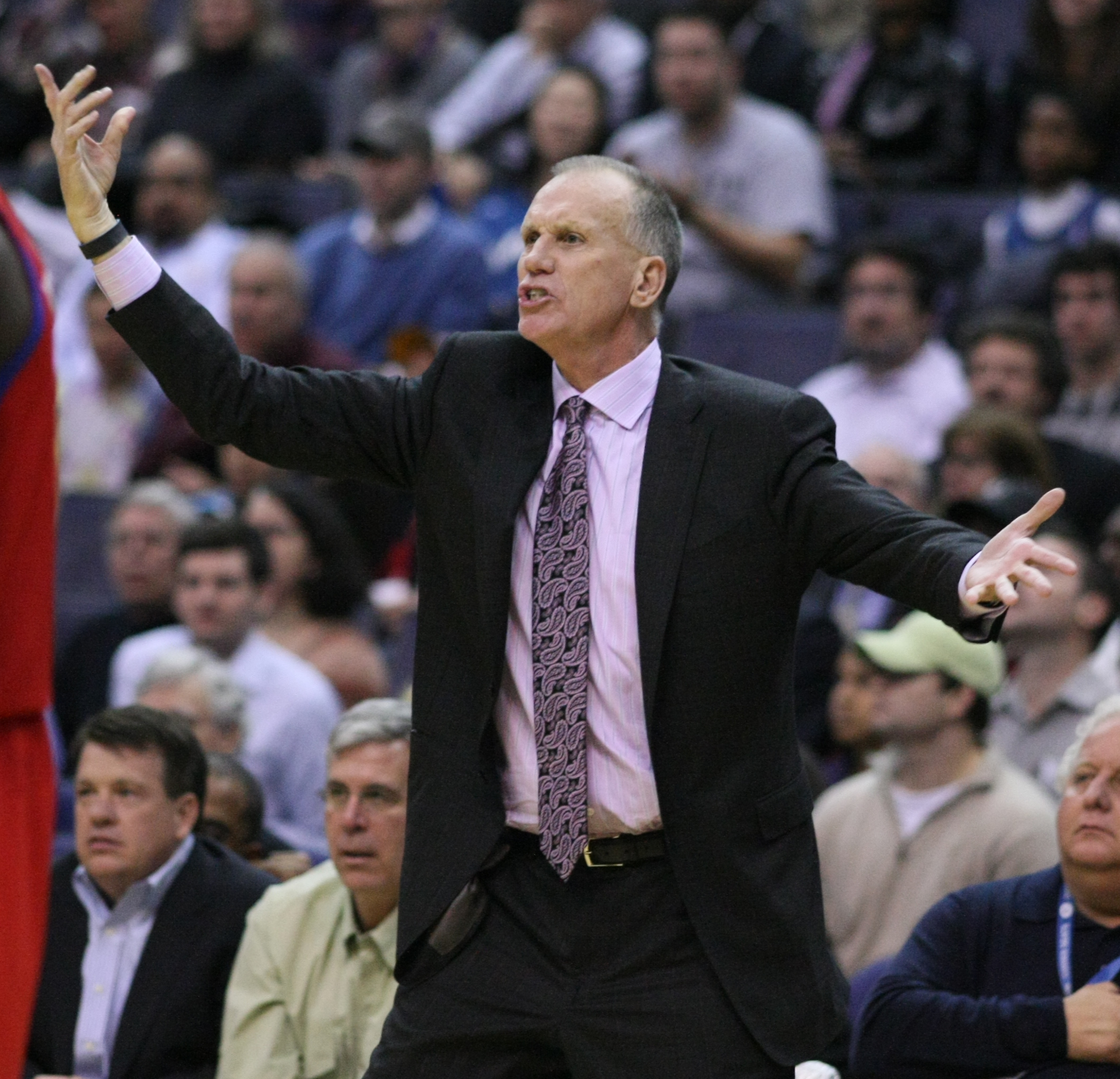
Doug Collins was hired by the 76ers as head coach in 2010, after previously playing for the team in the 1970s.

On May 20, 2010, TNT analyst Doug Collins was named head coach of the 76ers. Collins played for the Sixers for his entire NBA career after being the first overall pick in the 1973 draft, and had previously coached the Chicago Bulls, Detroit Pistons, and the Washington Wizards. The 76ers had the sixth-best odds at receiving the top pick in the 2010 draft, and they managed to land the second overall pick, beating out the Warriors, Kings, Timberwolves, and Nets, who all had better odds. They used that draft pick to select Ohio State University's Evan Turner.

The Sixers started the season with an uninspiring 3–13 mark, but started turning things around, to finish with a 41–41 record. They clinched a playoff berth on April 1, 2011, their third in the last four years. The 76ers faced the heavily favored Miami Heat in the first round, and ultimately fell to them in five games. Although they lost the series, Collins was praised for turning around a lottery team in his first season, as well as winning a playoff game when many pundits predicted that the Sixers would be swept. Collins also finished second in Coach of the Year voting.

=== 2011–12 season ===
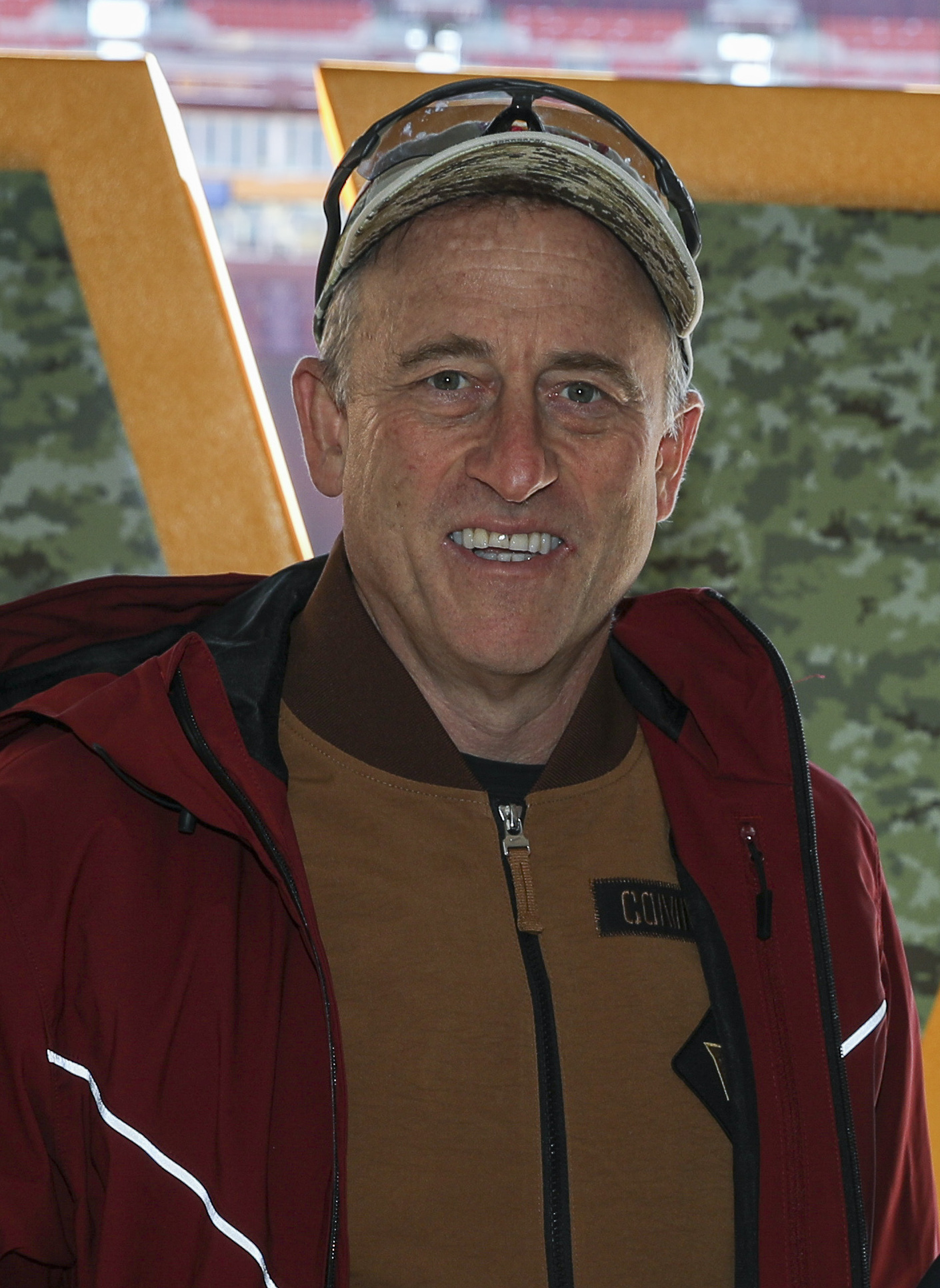
Apollo Global Management co-founder Josh Harris led an investment group that purchased the team for $280 million in 2011.

On July 13, 2011, Comcast-Spectacor reached an agreement to sell the 76ers to an investment group led by Apollo Global Management co-founder Josh Harris for $280 million. Other initial members of the group included David Blitzer, Art Wrubel, Jason Levien, Adam Aron, Martin J. Geller, David B. Heller, James Lassiter, Marc J. Leder, Michael G. Rubin, Will Smith, Jada Pinkett Smith, and Erick Thohir. Harris decided to retain head coach Doug Collins and president of basketball operations Rod Thorn but fired Ed Stefanski, who served as general manager since 2007.

The 2011–12 NBA season was delayed into December and the Sixers did not hold their home opener until January 6, 2012. The Sixers had their best start since the 2000–01 season with a 20–9 record, battling for the Eastern Conference's best record and taking a firm division lead. The Sixers, however, finished the rest of the season 15–22, giving them a 35–31 record. The 76ers lost hold of the top-three seed and division championship that they held for most of the season, by going on the losing steak. Nevertheless, they clinched their fourth playoff berth in the last five years on the penultimate play date of the season.

Philadelphia earned the eighth seed in the 2012 NBA playoffs, facing the 1st-seeded Chicago Bulls. Philadelphia improved from their struggles in the second half of the regular season, beating Chicago 4–2 to win their first series since 2003. This was the fifth time in NBA history that an eight seed has beaten one seed. They then faced their rival, the Boston Celtics, in the second round, and were eliminated 4–3. The Sixers once again faced criticism for their lack of a true scorer, as they were not able to keep pace with the Celtics' scoring. They were, however, given credit for winning the regular-season series against Boston and forcing the playoff series to seven games against the Celtics, who had won the last four division championships.

== 2012–2014: The rebuilding years ==
=== 2012–13 season ===
To re-tool for the upcoming season, The 76ers selected Maurice 'Mo' Harkless, and Arnett Moultrie (via trade with Miami) in the 2012 NBA draft. The Sixers then used their amnesty clause on Elton Brand, traded for Dorell Wright, signed Nick Young, Kwame Brown, and Royal Ivey, and re-signed Spencer Hawes and Lavoy Allen. Lou Williams, and Jodie Meeks left through free agency.

On August 9, 2012, the 76ers agreed to a four-team trade with the Los Angeles Lakers, Orlando Magic and Denver Nuggets. In the trade that sent six-time All-Star Dwight Howard to the Lakers, Philadelphia agreed to send 2011 first-round pick Nikola Vučević, 2012 first-round draft pick Maurice Harkless, and a future first-round draft picks to Orlando, as well as All-Star swingman Andre Iguodala to Denver. In exchange, they received Jason Richardson from the Magic and All-Star center Andrew Bynum from the Los Angeles Lakers.

The Sixers started the 2012–13 NBA season with high expectations with the help of Andrew Bynum and the growth of the young Sixers. However, Bynum's debut with the 76ers took a hit when he was sidelined for precautionary reasons, about the Orthokine knee procedure he received during the off-season. At first it looked like Bynum would be out only shortly, but little success in healing and setbacks pushed Bynum's return date further and further. As a result of many setbacks, on March 19, the Sixers announced that Bynum would have season-ending surgery on both knees. Bynum wasn't the only Sixer to suffer through injuries. On February 8, Jason Richardson also went through season-ending knee surgery. Jrue Holiday, Thaddeus Young, Nick Young, and Royal Ivey also had injuries that sidelined them for weeks. By the end of the season, Evan Turner and Spencer Hawes were the only Sixers to play in every game during the season. The Sixers started the season 12–9 but stumbled through a tough stretch and couldn't recover. The Sixers finished the season 34–48, missing the playoffs for the first time since Doug Collins had taken over as head coach.

On April 18, Collins resigned as 76ers coach, citing his declining health and need to spend time with his grandchildren. He stayed with the team as an adviser. Soon after, general manager Tony DiLeo had "cut ties" with the team. On May 11, it was announced that Sam Hinkie, who had previously worked for the Houston Rockets, would replace DiLeo as general manager. On July 8, it was announced that Adam Aron had stepped down as CEO, and was being replaced by Scott O'Neil. Aron maintained his position as co-owner of the team.

=== 2013–14 season ===
After the 2012–13 season, the Sixers, led by Hinkie, chose to rebuild the franchise. The first move of this new plan was executed during the 2013 draft, when the Sixers agreed in principle to trade Jrue Holiday and the 42nd pick in the draft, Pierre Jackson, to the New Orleans Pelicans for Nerlens Noel and the Pelicans' 2014 first-round pick. The trade was made official on July 12. Holiday had been the team's marquee player and was coming off a season that saw him make his first NBA All-Star Game. Noel was recovering from an anterior cruciate ligament injury suffered while in college, strongly indicating that he would not be able to make an immediate impact for the Sixers as he would be inactive to start the season. The Sixers used the 11th pick in the draft to select Michael Carter-Williams as Holiday's replacement as the starting point guard. The Sixers chose Arsalan Kazemi with the 54th overall pick, making Kazemi the first Iranian was chosen in the NBA draft.

After the Holiday trade, many of the team's returning players were either waived or left the team in free agency, most notably Andrew Bynum; of the 15 players on the team's roster during their final game of the 2012–13 season, only six remained with the team by January 1, 2014. In their place were several young prospects, many coming from the NBA Development League or signing with the Sixers after playing limited roles on other teams. Further moves at the trade deadline on February 20, 2014, saw the exits of veterans Spencer Hawes, Evan Turner, and Lavoy Allen, all of whom were key rotational players.

The 76ers, predicted by many to finish with the worst record in the league, had a 3–0 start that included wins over the two-time defending champion Miami Heat and a Chicago Bulls team with high expectations. However, the Sixers struggled mightily after that, at one point posting a 26-game losing streak which set a franchise record and tied the all-time NBA record for most consecutive losses in a single-season. During the middle of the season, former Orland Magic head coach Stan Van Gundy would call the Sixers' actions "embarrassing" and saying "if you're putting that roster on the floor, you're doing everything you can possibly do to try to lose." The Sixers finished the season with a 19–63 record, the third-worst in franchise history. Despite that, the Sixers did not have the worst win–loss record in the overall NBA standings: the Bucks fared worse with a 15–67 record.

Carter-Williams led all rookies in points, rebounds, assists, and steals, joining Magic Johnson and Oscar Robertson as the only rookies to do such a feat. He also won the player of the week award in his first week, being the second rookie after Shaquille O'Neal to accomplish that. He went on to win the Rookie of the Year award, becoming the first rookie drafted 10th or later to win the award since Mark Jackson in 1987 for the Knicks.

== 2014–2020: The Joel Embiid era ==
=== 2014–15 season ===
In the 2014 NBA draft, the Sixers selected Joel Embiid with the third overall pick, and traded with Orlando for Croatian prospect Dario Šarić, the 12th pick of the draft. Neither prospect was expected to make an immediate impact for the Sixers, as Embiid was recovering from a stress fracture in the navicular bone, while Šarić would likely spend one or more years playing in the Turkish League. In the second round, the Sixers selected K. J. McDaniels, Jerami Grant, Jordan McRae, and Serbian prospect Vasilije Micić. The Sixers also traded a second-round pick to re-acquire Pierre Jackson from the New Orleans Pelicans.

In the 2014 off-season, the Sixers traded Thaddeus Young to Minnesota in the Kevin Love to Cleveland trade, and received the Heat's 2015 first-round draft pick, Luc Mbah a Moute and Alexey Shved, leaving only two players with three years of experience on the Sixers remaining.

In June 2014 it was announced that the team would move their practice facility and home offices to the Camden Waterfront, across the Delaware River from Philadelphia in Camden, New Jersey.

On November 29, 2014, the 76ers lost to the Dallas Mavericks 103–110 and set a franchise record for losses to start the season, as they fell to a record of 0–16. After losing their next game against the San Antonio Spurs to make it 0–17, the 76ers were on the verge of tying the NBA record of 18 straight losses to start a season if they lost to the Minnesota Timberwolves on December 3, but they broke their losing streak and won their first game of the 2014–15 season with an 85–77 victory at Minnesota.

In three deals at the 2015 NBA trade deadline, the 76ers traded Carter-Williams and McDaniels for JaVale McGee, Isaiah Canaan, and three draft picks, including a protected 2015 first round pick originally owned by the Los Angeles Lakers.

The Sixers finished the season with an 18–64 record, tied with the second-worst in franchise history since 1995–96 when Jerry Stackhouse drafted in Philly. Despite that, the Sixers did not have the worst win–loss record in the overall NBA standings: the Timberwolves fared worse with a 16–66 record and the Knicks fared second with a 17–65 record.

=== 2015–16 season ===
On May 19, the 76ers were awarded the third overall pick in the 2015 NBA draft, where they selected Duke center Jahlil Okafor with the third overall pick. The 76ers also signed J. P. Tokoto with the 58th overall pick. As of November 14, 2015, Philadelphia 76ers lost their 25th straight dating back to the last season in their loss against Los Angeles Clippers with their 100–95 road loss against Minnesota Timberwolves which give Timberwolves their First Home Win. On November 27, the 76ers lost to the Houston Rockets 116–114, giving them a 27-game losing streak dating back to last season, which became the longest losing streak in professional sports, during the same game the Sixers set a franchise record of 16 total triples during the losing effort. On December 1, the 76ers beat the Los Angeles Lakers at home by a score of 103–91, but not before setting a league record 28 consecutive losses dating to the 2014–2015 season. In doing so, the 76ers also managed to avoid setting a new NBA record of most losses to begin a season. They instead tied the old record of 18 losses set by the then New Jersey Nets in the 2009–10 season.

=== 2018–19: Jimmy Butler year ===
On November 12, 2018, the 76ers traded Šarić, Robert Covington, Jerryd Bayless and a 2022 second-round draft pick to the Minnesota Timberwolves in exchange for Jimmy Butler and Justin Patton.

On February 6, 2019, the 76ers acquired forward Tobias Harris, as well as Boban Marjanović and Mike Scott, in a trade with the Los Angeles Clippers, sending Wilson Chandler, Mike Muscala, Landry Shamet, a protected 2020 first-round pick, Miami's unprotected 2021 first-round pick and Detroit's 2021 and 2023 second-round pick to the Clippers. The 76ers completed the season as the third seed. In the playoffs, the 76ers defeated the Brooklyn Nets in five games in the conference first round, but lost in the conference semifinals to the Toronto Raptors in seven games. This is because Kawhi Leonard scored the first-ever game 7 buzzer beater in NBA history.

== 2020–present: Maxey and Embiid duo ==
Before the season, the Sixers were expected to be another championship contender, as they were in the past two seasons, especially with Kawhi Leonard having left the conference. The Sixers had one of the worst away records in the NBA, but their league-best home record, with only 2 losses, kept the team afloat in the playoff race.

After the suspension of the 2019–20 NBA season, the 76ers were one of the 22 teams invited to the NBA Bubble to participate in the final eight games of the regular season. The Sixers started the bubble in the sixth seed, tied with the Pacers, who had the tiebreaker. The regular season finished with the 76ers in the sixth seed, a notable decrease in position from the previous two seasons. In the first round of the playoffs, the 76ers were eliminated by the Celtics in a 4–0 sweep. Head coach Brett Brown was fired on August 24, 2020.

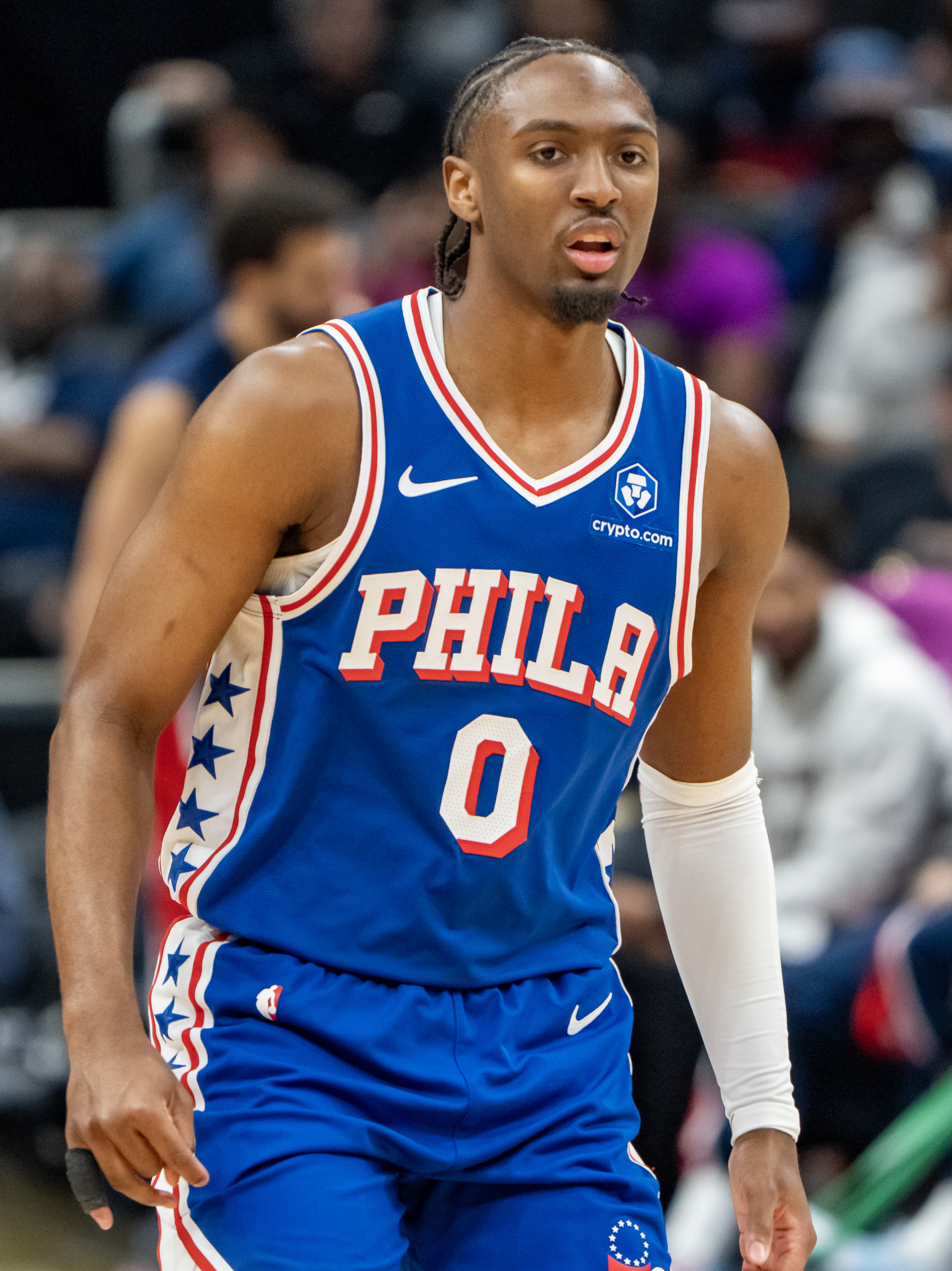
Tyrese Maxey

On October 3, 2020, the 76ers hired Doc Rivers as their new head coach. At the season's end the 76ers got the 21st pick for the first round in the 2020 NBA draft. With that pick, the team drafted Tyrese Maxey out of Kentucky. On November 2, the 76ers hired Daryl Morey to be their president of basketball operations. The 76ers went 49–23 and clinched the first seed in the Eastern Conference, capturing the division title for the first time in 20 years. In the opening round, they defeated the Washington Wizards in five games but lost to the Atlanta Hawks in the Conference Semifinals in seven games. Franchise player Joel Embiid, placed second in the voting for the NBA Most Valuable Player Award for the 2020–21 regular season behind first-placed winner Nikola Jokić.

After the Game 7 loss to the Hawks in which Ben Simmons controversially passed on an open dunk to tie the game, Simmons demanded a trade and held out from participating in training camp. The 76ers fined Simmons for conduct detrimental to the team, reportedly in excess of $19 million.

=== 2022–2024 ===
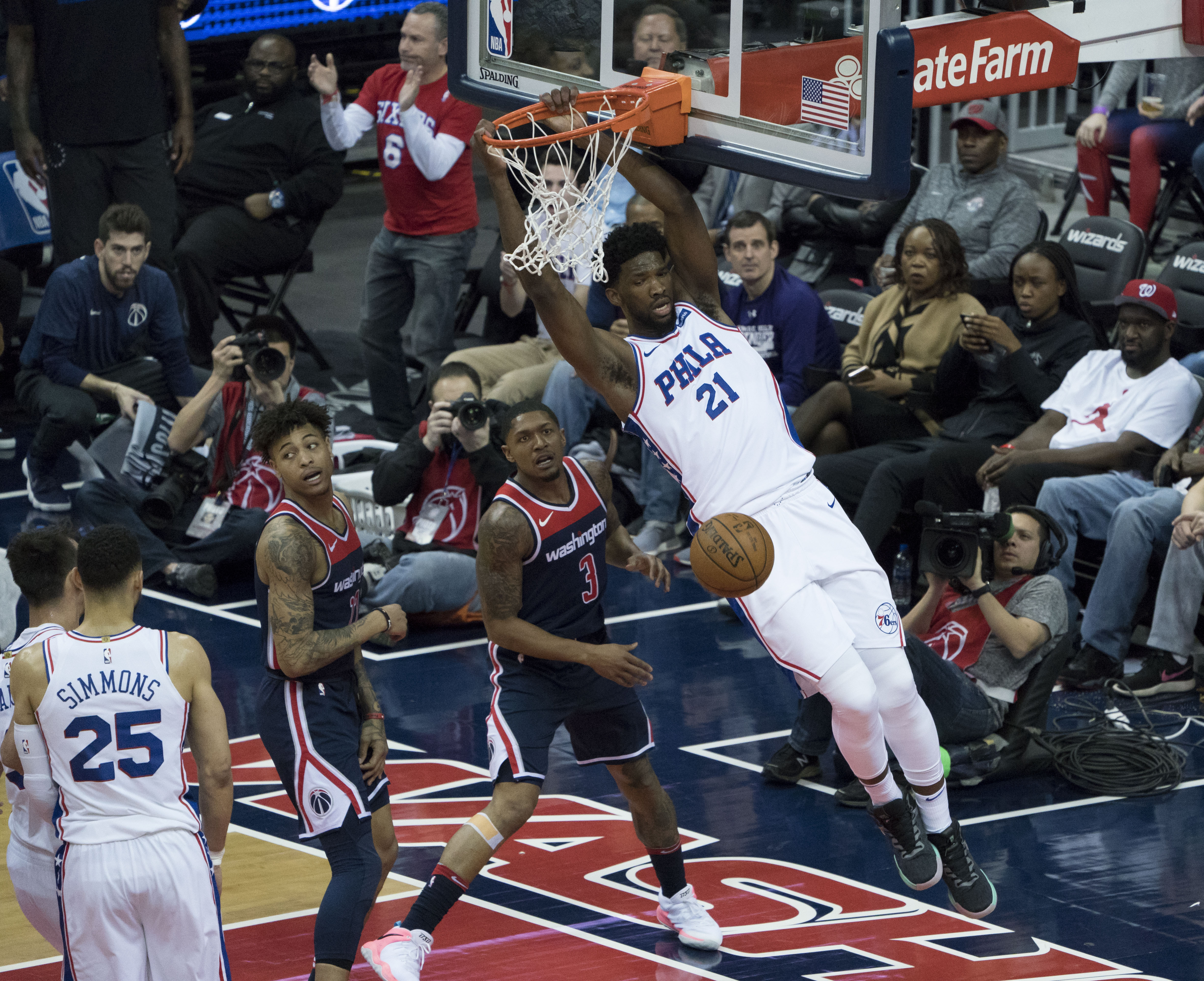
Joel Embiid dunking the ball during a 2018 76ers game. He was named the team's fifth NBA Most Valuable Player in 2023

On February 10, 2022, the 76ers acquired James Harden and Paul Millsap from the Brooklyn Nets in exchange for Simmons, Andre Drummond, Seth Curry, and two first-round picks. The 2021–22 season finished with a 51–31 record, led by Embiid, Harden, and second-year shooting guard Tyrese Maxey. Embiid won the scoring title averaging 30.6 points per game. In a repeat of the previous season's MVP race, Embiid finished second in the 2021–22 NBA Most Valuable Player Award contest behind Nikola Jokić.

On June 24, the Sixers traded Danny Green and the 23rd pick of the draft who would turn out to be David Roddy for De'Anthony Melton. In a four team trade, the 76ers acquired Jalen McDaniels but had to give up perimeter defender Matisse Thybulle who got traded to the Portland Trail Blazers. The 2022–23 season was successful for the Sixers. They clinched a Playoff Spot on March 21. They finished the season 54–28 as the third seed. After sweeping the Brooklyn Nets, the Boston Celtics prevailed in 7 Games and gave the Sixers another second-round exit. Despite this, Joel Embiid was named league MVP.

On May 16, 2023, head coach Doc Rivers was fired and replaced by Nick Nurse on June 1. The Sixers traded James Harden, P. J. Tucker and Filip Petrušev to the Los Angeles Clippers for Marcus Morris, Robert Covington, and Nicolas Batum. The Sixers started the season 29–13 as the second seed in the East, but Joel Embiid tore his Lateral Meniscus. Embiid returned on March 5. During Joel's absence, the Sixers fell to the 8th Seed and Tyrese Maxey made his first All-Star game. They finished the season as the 7th seed with a record of 47–35, qualifying for the Play-in game. The Sixers made it out of the Play-In, beating the Miami Heat to advance to the playoffs but were beaten 4–2 in the first round by the New York Knicks.

=== 2024–2026: Arrival of Paul George and Daryl Morey's departure ===
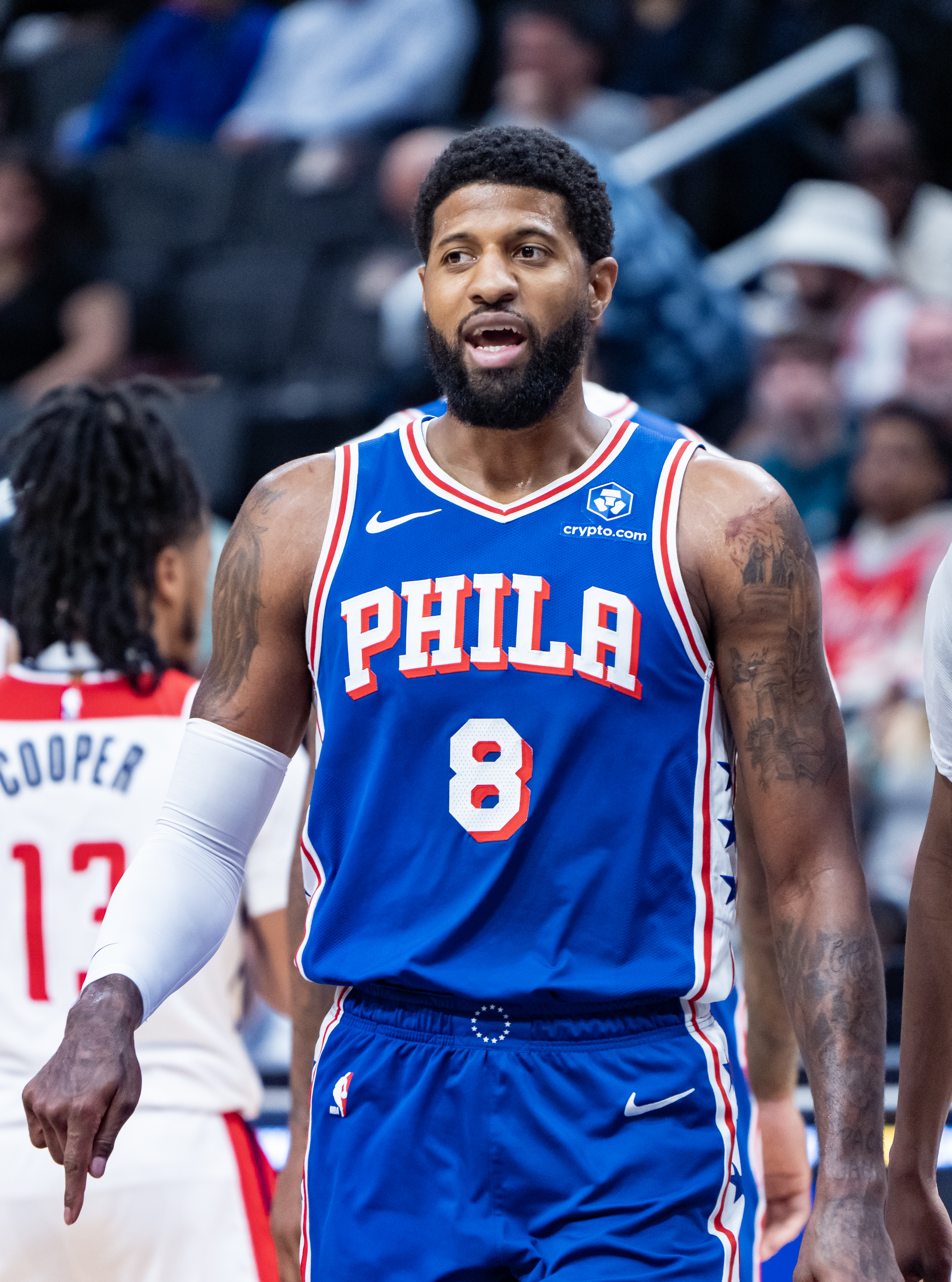
Paul George with the 76ers in 2026

That off-season, Paul George signed a four-year max contract deal with the Sixers. They also resigned Kyle Lowry and acquired Eric Gordon. Tobias Harris also signed with the Pistons.

On February 4, 2025, Grimes has traded to the Sixers alongside a 2025 second-round pick in exchange for Caleb Martin. Grimes scored a then-career-high 44 points against the Golden State Warriors on March 1. He bested that on March 17 with 46 points, with other career-highs of eight three-point field goals and 13 rebounds. In 28 appearances (25 starts) for Philadelphia, Grimes averaged 21.9 points, 5.2 rebounds, and 4.5 assists.

In 2025, the 76ers were awarded the third overall pick in the 2025 NBA draft, where they selected Baylor guard V. J. Edgecombe with the third overall pick. On October 22, 2025, Edgecombe scored 34 points, pulled down seven rebounds and collected three assists to help the Sixers to a 117–116 win against the Boston Celtics. Morey departed on May 12, 2026, after the Sixers were swept in the second round by the Knicks. The team named former Warriors general manager Bob Myers as the interim president of basketball operations.

=== 2026–present: Post-PG and arrival of Jaylen Brown and LeBron James ===
On May 29, 2026, the Sixers confirmed hiring Mike Gansey as President of Basketball Operations. On July 6, the Sixers traded for guard Jaylen Brown, dealing away Paul George, two first-round picks and two second-round picks. On July 24, the Sixers signed LeBron James to a 2-year, $8 million contract.

== See also ==
- South Philadelphia Sports Complex
- Sports in Philadelphia
