= David Blitzer =

American investor and sports team owner (born 1969)

- Born: David Scott Blitzer; September 7, 1969 (age 57); Scotch Plains, New Jersey, U.S.
- Education: University of Pennsylvania (BS)
- Occupations: Investor; sports team owner
- Employer: Blackstone (1991–present)
- Organizations: Harris Blitzer Sports & Entertainment; Global Football Holdings
- Known for: First to own team equity in five major sports leagues in the U.S. (NBA, NHL, NFL, MLS, MLB)
- Title: Chairman of Tactical Opportunities; Blackstone; Managing partner; New Jersey Devils (NHL); Philadelphia 76ers (NBA); Philadelphia WNBA team (WNBA); General partner; Crystal Palace (EPL)
- Board member of: Mount Sinai Health System; Wharton School
- Spouse: Allison Ross
- Children: 5

David Scott Blitzer (born September 7, 1969) is an American investor and sports team owner. Blitzer is the chairman of the private equity firm Blackstone's tactical opportunities division and managing partner of the New Jersey Devils ice hockey team and the Philadelphia 76ers basketball team. He additionally owns several association football clubs under Global Football Holdings and holds minority stakes in the Cleveland Guardians baseball team and the Washington Commanders American football team. Blitzer is the first person to own team equity in the five major professional sports leagues of the U.S..

Blitzer graduated from the Wharton School of the University of Pennsylvania. He joined Blackstone in 1991, where he served as the firm's global head of tactical opportunities from 2012 until transitioning to chairman in 2024. He and Apollo Global Management co-founder Josh Harris are frequent partners, with the pair entering sports business together in 2011 and establishing Harris Blitzer Sports & Entertainment in 2017. Blitzer has an estimated net worth of $3.6 billion as of 2026.

== Career ==
=== Early life and Blackstone ===
Blitzer was born on September 7, 1969, in Scotch Plains, New Jersey. He graduated from Scotch Plains-Fanwood High School in 1987 and graduated magna cum laude from the Wharton School of the University of Pennsylvania in 1991. Blitzer joined the private equity firm Blackstone shortly after graduation and worked out of London from 2001 to 2011 to oversee the company's interests in Europe. He is a member of their management committee and headed their global Tactical Opportunities group from 2012 until stepping down and becoming chairman in November 2024.

=== Sports ownership ===
List of sports franchises managed under Harris Blitzer Sports & Entertainment
Team	League	Year	Notes
Philadelphia 76ers	National Basketball Association (NBA)	2011	Co-managing partner with Josh Harris. Includes the Delaware Blue Coats of the NBA G League.
New Jersey Devils	National Hockey League (NHL)	2013	Managing partner with Harris. Includes the Prudential Center and the Utica Comets of the American Hockey League.
Philadelphia WNBA team	Women's National Basketball Association (WNBA)	2025	Managing partner with Harris.

List of sports franchises managed under Global Football Holdings
Team	League	Year	Notes
Estoril Praia	Primeira Liga	2019	Owner
Alcorcók	Segunda División	2019	Owner
Beveren	Challenger Pro League	2020	Co-owner with Jahm Najafi and Jeff Moorad
FC Augsburg	Bundesliga	2021	Co-owner with Klaus Hofmann; 45% stake
ADO Den Haag	Eredivisie	2021	Owner
Brøndby	Danish Superliga	2022	Owner (50.1%)

List of sports franchises managed under Bolt Ventures
Team	League	Year	Notes
Royal Challengers Bengaluru	Indian Premier League (IPL)	2026	Co-owner with Aditya Birla Group, The Times Group and Blackstone Inc.
Royal Challengers Bengaluru Women	Women's Premier League (WPL)	2026	Co-owner with Aditya Birla Group, The Times Group and Blackstone Inc.

Other sports investments
Team	League	Year	Notes
Crystal Palace	Premier League	2015	General partner with Steve Parish, John Textor, and Josh Harris; 18% stake
Cleveland Guardians	Major League Baseball (MLB)	2022	Limited partner; 25% stake with the option to become majority owner in 2028
Joe Gibbs Racing	NASCAR	2023	Limited partner under HBSE with Harris.
Washington Commanders	National Football League (NFL)	2023	Limited partner under Josh Harris
Jupiter Links Golf Club	TGL	2023	Co-owner with Tiger Woods
Real Salt Lake	Major League Soccer (MLS)	2025	Limited partner; co-owned with Ryan Smith from 2022 until selling to Gail Miller in 2025
Utah Royals	National Women's Soccer League (NWSL)	2025	Limited partner; co-owned with Ryan Smith from 2022 until selling to Gail Miller in 2025
LOVB Austin	LOVB Pro	2025	Co-owner with Peter Holt and Amy Griffin

Blitzer began contemplating investing in sports after meeting Apollo Global Management co-founder Josh Harris in 2008 at The Punch Bowl, a pub in London. By 2011, those talks led to the pair forming an investment group that purchased the Philadelphia 76ers of the National Basketball Association (NBA) for $280 million. Other initial members of the group included Art Wrubel, Jason Levien, Adam Aron, Martin Geller, David Heller, James Lassiter, Marc Leder, Michael Rubin, Will Smith, Jada Pinkett Smith, and Erick Thohir. In August 2013, Blitzer and Harris purchased the New Jersey Devils of the National Hockey League (NHL) and their arena, the Prudential Center, for $320 million. Blitzer and investor David Abrams headed a group that owned 50% of the Scranton/Wilkes-Barre RailRiders, the Triple-A affiliate of the New York Yankees, from 2014 until selling to Diamond Baseball Holdings in 2021.

Blitzer co-founded Harris Blitzer Sports & Entertainment with Harris in 2017. In addition to the 76ers and Devils, the company also owns the NBA G League's Delaware Blue Coats, the American Hockey League's Utica Comets, esports team Dignitas of New Meta Entertainment, HBSE Real Estate, sports tech venture capital firm HBSE Ventures, and marketing, hospitality, and event ticketing company Elevate Sports Ventures. In January 2022, Blitzer and Qualtrics co-founder Ryan Smith purchased Real Salt Lake of Major League Soccer (MLS) and America First Field, which included the affiliated Real Monarchs and Zions Bank Stadium. The pair also reestablished the Utah Royals of the National Women's Soccer League (NWSL), which had gone defunct in 2020 and became the Kansas City Current. He sold Real Salt Lake, the Royals, and America First Field to Gail Miller in April 2025, with him remaining as a minority investor. Blitzer purchased a 25 percent stake in the MLB's Cleveland Guardians in June 2022, with an option to acquire controlling interest in 2028. Blitzer is the first person to hold team equity in five major professional sports leagues of North America: the NBA, NHL, NFL, MLS, and MLB.

Blitzer purchased an 18% stake in the English football club Crystal Palace in 2015. He later formed Global Football Holdings, which has invested in Estoril Praia (Portugal), Alcorcón (Spain), Beveren (Belgium), FC Augsburg (Germany), ADO Den Haag (Netherlands), and Brøndby (Denmark). In 2020, Blitzer and Harris bought a $140 million stake in the Pittsburgh Steelers of the National Football League (NFL). In 2023, he was a part of another group led by Harris that purchased the NFL's Washington Commanders for $6.05 billion. The same year, Blitzer invested in the return of SlamBall, a basketball league combining elements of other sports, and bought a minority stake in Joe Gibbs Racing by way of HBSE in 2023. He was named to the NHL's Executive Committee in October 2023, which is responsible for vetting new ownership applications, collective bargaining, and league expansion. Blitzer and professional golfer Tiger Woods are owners of the Jupiter Links Golf Club of the virtual golf league TGL, founded in 2023.

In 2024, he sold his stake in the Steelers to Art Rooney II and Thomas Tull. Blitzer is a member of College Sports Tomorrow, a group formed in 2024 consisting of 20 pro team owners, league executives, and college administrators proposing an overhaul to college football, including abolishing conferences and reorganizing Power Five schools in seven divisions of ten each with a system of promotion and relegation for the rest, in addition to changes to NIL deals and the transfer portal. Blitzer and Harris have also invested in youth sports brands, forming Unrivaled Sports as a parent company in March 2024 with capital from The Chernin Group. He was among a group of investors in Major League Table Tennis and LOVB Pro, a women's indoor volleyball league, in 2024 and the Snow League, a snowboarding and freestyle skiing league created by Shaun White, in 2025. In June 2025, HBSE was awarded a Philadelphia WNBA team to begin play in 2030. In June 2025, Blitzer became a co-owner of LOVB Austin with Peter Holt and Amy Griffin. In March 2026, Blitzer was announced as a co-owner of the Indian Premier League cricket team Royal Challengers Bengaluru (RCB) and their women's team in the Women's Premier League with Aditya Birla Group, The Times Group and Blackstone Inc., with the new cricket holdings managed under Bolt Ventures. The sale of RCB was the highest sale of any cricket team, at ₹16,660 crore (about US$1.78 billion) between the four co-ownership groups.

== Personal life ==
Blitzer is Jewish. He is married to Allison (née Ross) Blitzer; they have five children. His net worth was estimated in January 2026 to be $3.6 billion. Blitzer's father-in-law, Stuart Ross—who once owned the North American rights to The Smurfs franchise—was convicted of extortion in 2010 and sentenced to five years of probation after attempting to extort $11 million from Blitzer.
