= Michael Rubin (businessman) =

American businessman (born 1972)

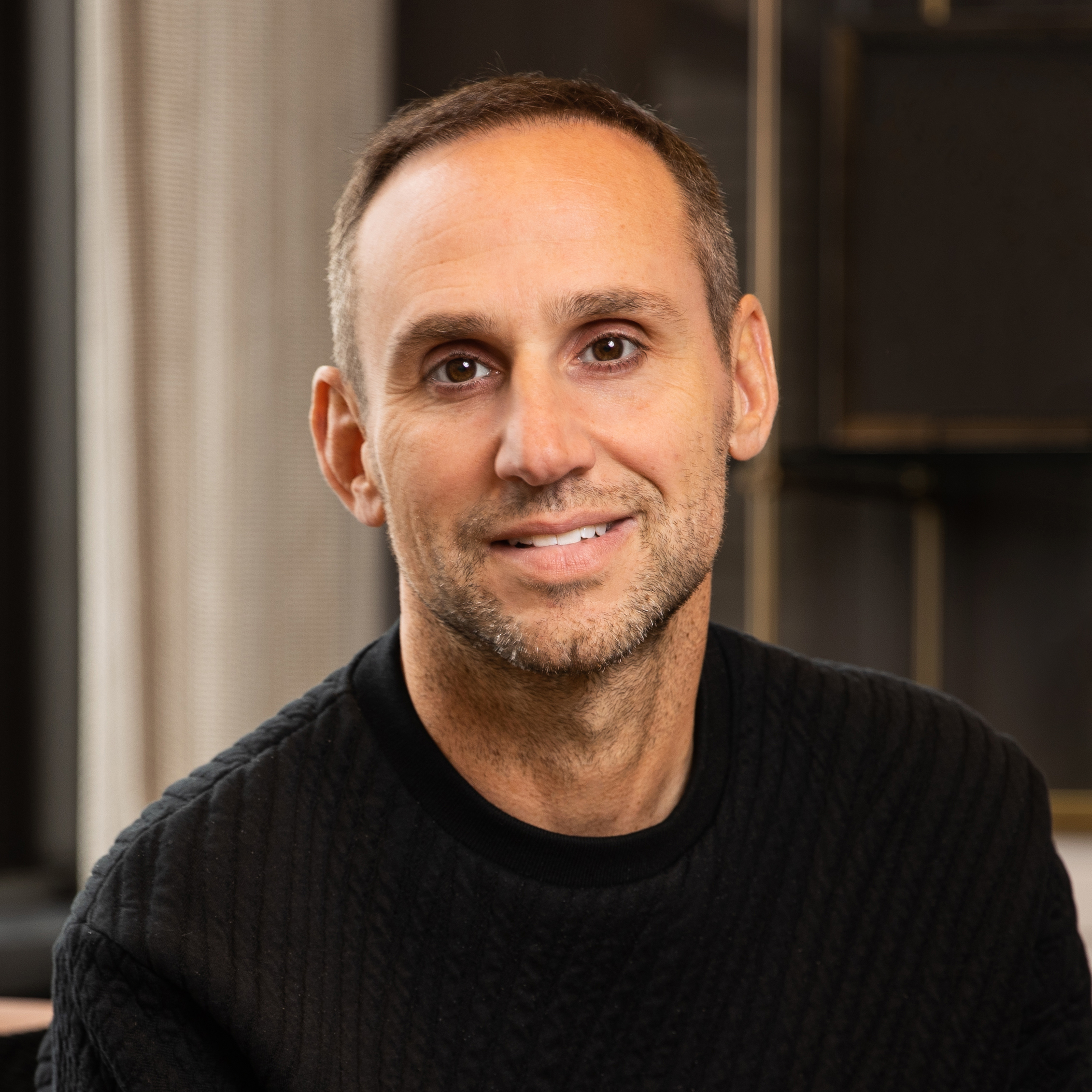
- Rubin in 2023
- Born: Michael Gary Rubin; July 21, 1972 (age 54); Philadelphia, Pennsylvania, U.S.
- Education: Villanova University (dropped out)
- Occupations: Businessman; philanthropist
- Known for: GSI Commerce; REFORM Alliance; All In Challenge
- Title: Founder and CEO of Fanatics; Co-chair REFORM Alliance
- Spouse: Meegan Spector (m. 2005; div. 2012) Camille Fishel (after 2016)
- Children: 3

Michael Gary Rubin (/ˈruːbɪn/ ROO-bin; born July 21, 1972) is an American businessman and socialite. He is the founder and CEO of Fanatics, a global digital sports platform that consists of several businesses, including licensed sports merchandise, trading cards and collectibles, sports betting and iGaming, special events, and live commerce. He is a board member of Rue Gilt Groupe, which includes RueLaLa.com, Gilt.com, and ShopPremiumOutlets.com. He founded GSI Commerce in 1998, selling it to eBay in 2011 for US$2.4 billion.

In 2011, Rubin became a partner of the Philadelphia 76ers basketball team and the New Jersey Devils hockey team. In June 2022, Rubin sold his stakes in Harris Blitzer Sports & Entertainment, the holding company of both, to focus on the expansion of Fanatics. He is the co-chair of the REFORM Alliance, a criminal justice reform organization that he launched in January 2019, together with Jay-Z, Meek Mill, Robert Kraft, and Daniel S. Loeb, among others.

His annual "White Party", typically held at or around July 4, regularly draws celebrities from sports, media, entertainment, fashion, and other industries.

== Early life and education ==
Michael Gary Rubin was born on July 21, 1972, in Philadelphia, Pennsylvania, to Paulette and Ken Rubin. His mother was a psychiatrist and his father was a veterinarian. He was raised in a Jewish family. He grew up in Lafayette Hill, Pennsylvania, where he started a ski-tuning shop in his parents' basement when he was 12 and two years later, using $2,500 in bar mitzvah gifts as seed capital and a lease signed by his father, he opened a formal ski shop in Conshohocken, Pennsylvania, named Mike's Ski and Sport.

Rubin was educated at Plymouth-Whitemarsh High School. By the age of 16, he was some $120,000 in debt and was able to settle with his creditors using a $37,000 loan from his father under the condition he attend college. Rubin agreed, continuing to operate the business, which grew to five ski shops before he entered college. He attended Villanova University for a semester before dropping out after realizing a large gain on an opportunistic transaction. This involved buying $200,000 in overstock equipment at a deep discount with $17,000 borrowed from a friend and re-selling it for $75,000.

== Career ==
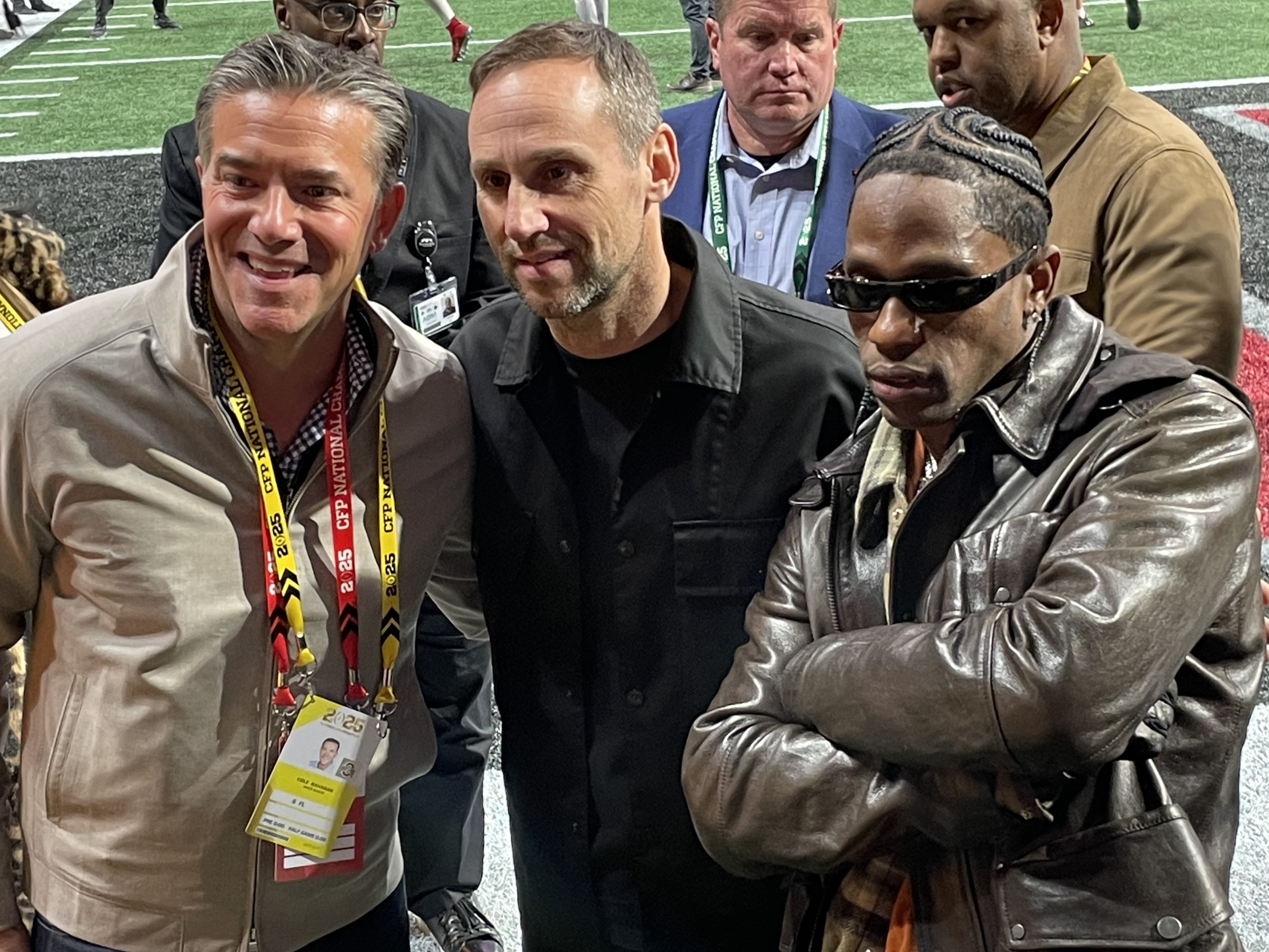
Rubin on the sideline of Mercedes-Benz Stadium with Learfield CEO Cole Gahagan and musician Travis Scott.

Using the proceeds from his serendipitous overstock transaction and after selling his ski shops, he founded the athletic equipment closeout company KPR sports—named after his parents' initials—which bought and sold over-stock name brand merchandise. In 1993, the year Rubin turned 21, KPR reached $1 million in annual sales. By 1995, KPR reached $50 million in sales. In 1995, Rubin purchased 40% of the women's athletic shoe manufacturer Rykä.

In 1998, Rubin created an apparel and logistics company, Global Sports Incorporated, which later turned into GSI Commerce, a multibillion-dollar e-commerce company. At 38, in 2011, Rubin sold GSI to eBay for $2.4 billion, reaping a $150 million windfall. As eBay just wanted the order fulfillment business for large retailers, so it could better compete with Amazon, Rubin was able to buy back the consumer businesses of GSI at a fire sale price.

He repurchased: Fanatics, Inc., a licensed sports merchandiser; Rue La La, a flash seller, and ShopRunner, a retail benefits program. Rubin is CEO of Fanatics and executive chairman of Rue La La's. In 2012, Rubin purchased Dreams Inc., an online retailer, for $183 million. In 2016, Rubin expanded Fanatics into new markets, such as the United Kingdom, with the acquisition of Kitbag. He has continued to expand Fanatics' international presence through partnerships with Premier League clubs, retail operations at Wembley Stadium, and The Open golf tournament.

In 2019, it was announced on CNBC that Simon Property Group would team up with Rubin to take their mall inventory online, and contribute $280 million to the venture. In December 2020, ShopRunner was sold to FedEx.

Rubin has orchestrated partnership deals for Fanatics with more than 900 professional and collegiate leagues, sports and teams, including deals with Nike, the National Football League and Major League Baseball, that grant Fanatics the rights to manufacture and distribute all Nike fan gear for both leagues. At the onset of the COVID-19 pandemic in early 2020, Rubin shut down a Fanatics' MLB uniform manufacturing plant to generate hospital gowns and PPE for frontline workers. In August 2020, he secured $350 million Series E funding for Fanatics that raised the valuation of the company to $6.2 billion.

Fanatics raised another $350 million in September 2021, one month after its expansion into the trading cards business, by acquiring the licensing rights for Major League Baseball and National Football League. In January 2022, Rubin completed the purchase of Topps, the trading card business, for $500 million to help diversify Fanatics beyond sports apparel. In March 2022, Rubin and Fanatics raised $1.5 billion, followed by another $700 million in December 2022, reportedly pushing the company's valuation to $31 billion. During the December round, Rubin announced Fanatics would be expanding into a third vertical in 2023, Fanatics Betting & Gaming.

It was reported at the time that these verticals may include NFTs, a space Rubin entered in May 2021 by co-founding digital collectibles company Candy Digital; sports betting and gaming; trading cards, ticketing and media. In January 2023, Fanatics divested its 60% stake in Candy Digital.

In January 2023, Rubin announced that Fanatics would partner with Northwest Stadium to open the first Fanatics sportsbook location, which also became the first legal sports betting operation inside an NFL stadium.

In August 2024, the first Fanatics Fest was held at the Javits Center in New York City. Rubin announced in December that Fanatics Fest would return to NYC in June 2025.

In September 2024, Rubin, in partnership with Jay-Z, opened the 21st Fanatics sportsbook location at Ocean Casino Resort in Atlantic City, New Jersey.

In April 2025, Rubin opened the Fanatics Collectibles London flagship store. Rubin helped organize Fanatics Fest 2025, which had record attendance of over 125,000 in June 2025.

Rubin announced the launch of Fanatics Studios, a media and entertainment studio, as a joint venture with OBB Media in January 2026. In July 2026, Fanatics Fest expanded under Rubin's leadership, increasing its exhibition space by 25% and featuring more than 400 athlete and celebrity appearances.

=== Philadelphia 76ers and New Jersey Devils stake ===
In October 2011, Rubin bought a minority share in the Philadelphia 76ers. Rubin was a member of the investment group that won a $280 million bid for the team led by Josh Harris and David Blitzer. Other notable members include Art Wrubel, Jason Levien, Adam Aron, Martin J. Geller, David B. Heller, James Lassiter, Will Smith, Jada Pinkett Smith, and Erick Thohir. The NBA formally approved the deal on October 13, 2011.

Also in October 2011, as a member of another investment group led by Harris and Blitzer, Rubin bought a share in the New Jersey Devils and the Prudential Center for $320 million. In 2022, Rubin sold his stakes in Harris Blitzer Sports & Entertainment, the holding company of both teams, to David J. Adelman due to a conflict of interest regarding Fanatics' growing sports betting business and player partnerships.

== Philanthropy ==
Rubin started the viral "ALL IN Challenge", which raised more than $60 million to fight food insecurity during the COVID-19 pandemic, with donations being made to charities including No Kid Hungry, Meals on Wheels, World Central Kitchen, and Feeding America.

Rubin co-founded the criminal justice reform organization REFORM Alliance in January 2019, along with Meek Mill, Jay-Z, Robert Kraft, Michael Novogratz, Clara Wu Tsai, Daniel Loeb, Robert F. Smith, and Laura Arnold, sharing in a pledge of $50 million to the organization. Rubin also holds an annual gala to benefit REFORM Alliance at the Ocean City Casino Resort in Atlantic City. In 2023, the gala raised $24 million for REFORM Alliance.

In January 2022, Rubin and Meek Mill donated $15 million to 100 schools in Philadelphia, and in January 2023, they were joined by Kevin Hart in committing $7 million to 60 Philadelphia schools. Rubin and Mill also previously launched a $2 million scholarship fund to aid Philadelphia students during the COVID-19 pandemic.

Also in 2023, Rubin launched Merch Madness Fan Gear Giveaway, where more than 300,000 items of licensed material were given to approximately 10,000 underserved families. Later that year, in October, Fanatics became Make-A-Wish's "Official Sports Partner" after Rubin pitched the idea to the Fanatics' senior leadership.

In January 2025, Fanatics partnered with L.A. sports teams for a campaign called L.A. Strong after Rubin received a call from Dodgers Executive Vice President Lon Rosen. Rubin organized and launched the event the following day to support individuals impacted by the L.A. wildfires.

== Media appearances ==
Rubin has been interviewed or quoted in business, lifestyle and sports publications such as Forbes, Fast Company, Vanity Fair, The Wall Street Journal, The New York Times, Fortune, Entrepreneur, People Magazine, and Sports Illustrated. He has been a guest on many popular podcasts, including On Purpose with Jay Shetty, The Bill Simmons Podcast, The Pat McAfee Show, and Pardon My Take.

Rubin has also been featured on Dateline NBC, Good Morning America, CBS This Morning, CNN, CNBC, and ESPN.

In 2010, he appeared in the premiere season of the CBS television show Undercover Boss, where he worked undercover in GSI Commerce's warehouse and call center. Once his identity was revealed at the end of the show, he gave an employee, who had recently struggled with the death of a baby, $10,000 so he and the baby's mother could have a dream wedding.

In fall 2023, Rubin was announced as a guest shark for the 15th season of the critically acclaimed and multi-Emmy Award-winning TV show Shark Tank. He joined Mark Cuban, Barbara Corcoran, Lori Greiner, Robert Herjavec, Daymond John and Kevin O'Leary, as they continue their search to invest in the best up-and-coming businesses and products on the market.

Rubin has been a featured speaker and panelist at several business and sports industry events including the MIT Sloan Sports Analytics Conferences, the Wharton Sports Business Summit, Recode's Code Commerce, the Fast Company Innovation Festival, TechCrunch Disrupt, and Wall Street Journal Tech Live. In November 2024, Rubin joined the USC Sports Business Association's annual summit as a guest speaker.

== Personal life ==
Rubin splits his time between the Philadelphia area, near where he grew up, Los Angeles, and New York City, where in 2018 it was reported that he purchased a $43.5 million penthouse.

Rubin is divorced from Meegan Spector. They have one daughter, Kylie who is 20. Rubin has two daughters with his partner, professional model Camille Fishel — Romi and Gigi . Rubin formerly dated television news anchor and author Nicole Lapin.

Rubin has been included in the Forbes 400: The Richest People in America, the Forbes: The World's Billionaires list, and the Bloomberg Billionaires Index. His wealth, as of August 2024, was valued at $11.5 billion.

Rubin was included in Bleacher Report's "Power 50" list in 2018, which highlights influential figures in sports culture. He was also recognized as one of the "Top 50 Most Influential People in Sports Business" by Sports Business Journal for five consecutive years between 2015 and 2019. In 2021, he was named the "Most Influential Person in Sports Business" by Sports Business Journal. In 2022, the publication recognized him as "Sports Executive of the Year". In 2024, Rubin was recognized by Sports Illustrated as one of "The 50 Most Influential Figures in Sports," and in 2025, he was recognized by Billboard as a "Sports and Music Power Player."

In 2026, Rubin was named to Time's inaugural TIME100 Sports list, recognizing 100 influential figures in sports.

=== Political contributions ===
Ahead of the 2025 Boston mayoral election, Rubin donated $1 million to the Super PAC Your City, Your Future, which supported Josh Kraft's campaign against incumbent mayor Michelle Wu, who was re-elected.

== See also ==
- Travis Scott
- Jay-Z
- Meek Mill
