= Martin Geller =

American businessman

- Born: Martin J. Geller
- Education: B.B.A. Baruch College; M.B.A. Pace University FS Investments
- Occupation: Businessman

Martin J. Geller is an American businessman and founder of Geller & Company. He is also a limited partner of Harris Blitzer Sports & Entertainment, which owns the Philadelphia 76ers and New Jersey Devils.

== Biography ==
Geller graduated with a B.B.A. in Accounting from Baruch College Zicklin School of Business and a M.B.A. in Finance from Pace University. In 1984, Geller founded the Geller Family Office Services LLC. The company evolved into a full services financial company, New York-based Geller & Company. Geller & Company provides strategic CFO consulting, financial reporting and accounting, tax advisory, investment management, information technology and integrated wealth management. Martin is a corporate board member of Bloomberg LP and Bloomberg Bureau of National Affairs in Washington, D.C.

Geller is a member of the investment group that won a $280 million bid for the purchase of the Philadelphia 76ers. The other members of the investment group are: Josh Harris of the private equity firm Apollo Global Management, portfolio manager Art Wrubel, former NBA agent, Sacramento Kings executive Jason Levien, David Blitzer of the Blackstone Group, former Vail Resorts CEO Adam Aron, David B. Heller, Travis Hennings, James Lassiter, Marc Leder, Michael Rubin, Will Smith & Jada Pinkett Smith, and Indonesian businessmen Handy Soetedjo & Erick Thohir. Comcast-Spectacor and Harris began talks in the summer of 2011. The deal was announced on July 13, 2011. The NBA formally approved the deal on October 13.

Geller serves on the Boards of Directors of the American Israel Education Foundation, the New York Police and Fire Widow's and Children's Benefit Fund, the Northeast Regional Council of the American Israel Public Affairs Committee, the Northeast Regional Council for the National Parks Conservation Association, and the Northeast Regional Leadership Cabinet of the U.S. Holocaust Memorial Museum. Geller is a member of the Americas Foundation of the Serpentine Galleries, is a former member for the advisory board of the Mayor's Fund to Advance New York City, and the Finance Committee of the UJA-Federation of New York.
