= Art Wrubel =

American private equity investor (born 1965)

- Born: Arthur Mitchell Wrubel; 1965 (age 60–61)
- Education: B.S. University of Pennsylvania
- Occupation: Private equity investor
- Known for: Founder of Wesley Capital Management; Minority owner of the Philadelphia 76ers

Arthur Mitchell Wrubel (born 1965) is an American private equity investor who founded Wesley Capital Management, LLC and is a minority owner of the Philadelphia 76ers of the National Basketball Association.

== Early life and education ==
Wrubel was born to a Jewish family, the son of Marcia Kay (née Pinkus) and Richard Isaac Wrubel. His family operated the Wrubels department store in Middletown, Connecticut, founded by his great-grandparents, Regina (née Glasscheib) and Isaac Wrubel. His great-uncle was composer and songwriter Allie Wrubel. In 1983, Wrubel graduated from Xavier High School in Middletown and in 1987, he graduated with a B.S. in economics from the Wharton School at the University of Pennsylvania where he was a member of the Sigma Alpha Mu fraternity.

== Career ==
After school, he worked for Chicago-based JMB Realty as an associate in their acquisition group. In 1993, he took a job with Dickstein & Co. where he focused in real estate, asset backed securities, and real estate corporate restructurings and was involved in some of the largest real estate restructurings including those of including Olympia & York, Cadillac Fairview, Rockefeller Center Properties, Bramalea, and Trizec Properties. In 2001, he ventured out on his own and founded Wesley Capital Management, LLC, a real estate focused hedge fund. Wrubel is a member of an investment group that won a $280 million bid for the purchase of the Philadelphia 76ers from Comcast Spectacor in 2011. The other members of the investment group are: Josh Harris, managing partner of the group and co-founder of private equity firm Apollo Global Management and David Blitzer of the private equity firm Blackstone Group, both fellow Wharton School of the University of Pennsylvania graduates, as well as former NBA agent and Sacramento Kings executive Jason Levien, former Vail Resorts CEO Adam Aron, Martin J. Geller, David B. Heller, Travis Hennings, James Lassiter, Marc Leder, Michael Rubin, Will Smith & Jada Pinkett Smith, and Indonesian businessmen Handy Soetedjo & Erick Thohir. Comcast-Spectacor and Harris began talks in the summer of 2011. The deal was announced on July 13, 2011. The NBA formally approved the deal on October 13.

== Additional affiliations and memberships ==
Wrubel is a member of the Board of Advisors at Mount Sinai Hospital’s, on the board of trustees at the Jewish Museum in Manhattan, and is on the Wharton Undergraduate Board at the University of Pennsylvania. Wrubel is also on the advisory board of Maxim Capital Group. He and his wife are strong supporters of the Jonah Maccabee Foundation, which provides grants to organizations that provide charity, promote music, or support Jewish causes.

== Personal life ==
He is married to Melanie Bloom.
