= David Heller =

American businessman (born 1968)

- Born: David B. Heller; 1968 (age 57–58)
- Education: Harvard University (BA)
- Children: 3

David B. Heller (born 1968) is an American businessman, former Goldman Sachs executive, and minority owner in the Philadelphia Sixers.

== Biography ==
In 1989, Heller received a B.A. from Harvard University with a concentration in American history. After school, he joined Goldman Sachs as a trader in Equity Derivatives. In 1993, he moved to Tokyo to become head of Volatility Trading and the co-head of Equities in Japan. In 1999, he transferred to London as head of Global Trading for Equity Derivatives. In 2006, he returned to New York City as global head of Equities Trading. Heller was named global co-head of the Securities Division in 2008 and senior director of Goldman Sachs in 2012.

Heller was a member of an investment group led by Josh Harris that purchased the Philadelphia 76ers for $280M in 2011. Other members of the investment group were Art Wrubel, Jason Levien, Adam Aron, Martin Geller, James Lassiter, Marc Leder, Michael Rubin, Will Smith, Jada Pinkett Smith, and Erick Thohir. Heller serves on the boards of Acumen Fund and the New Museum of Contemporary Art.

== Personal life ==
Heller lives in New York with his wife and three children.
