= Amy Griffin (author) =

American author

- Born: 1975 or 1976 (age 50–51)
- Education: University of Virginia (BA)
- Occupations: Author, Venture Capital
- Board member of: Bumble, Spanx
- Spouse: John Griffin
- Children: 4

Amy Griffin is an American venture capitalist and author. She is the founder of G9 Ventures, a private investment firm focused on consumer brands, and the author of the 2025 memoir The Tell, which became a New York Times bestseller and was selected for Oprah’s Book Club.

== Early life and education ==
Amy Griffin was born in the mid-1970s and grew up in Amarillo, Texas. Her family owned and operated Toot’n Totum, a regional chain of convenience and auto-service stores founded by her grandparents; her father later served as CEO of the company.

Griffin attended the University of Virginia on a volleyball scholarship, where she played on the women’s team, eventually becoming team captain and a two-time MVP. She graduated in 1998 with a Bachelor of Arts (BA) in English.

In 2003, at age 27, she married John Griffin, founder of the hedge fund Blue Ridge Capital (also a University of Virginia alumnus). The couple has four children and lives in New York City.

== Career ==
After graduating, Griffin worked in marketing and promotions, including roles at Ms. and Working Woman magazines before moving to Sports Illustrated, where she served as a sports marketing and Olympic manager.

Beginning around 2011, she began investing in and advising early-stage consumer companies, drawing on her branding and operating experience. In 2017–2018 she formalized this activity by founding G9 Ventures, a private investment firm focused primarily on consumer brands, with a strong emphasis on female-founded or female-led companies. Portfolio companies have included Bumble, Spanx, Goop, Hello Sunshine, On Running, Oura, Bobbie, and others.

Griffin has been involved in high-profile transactions, including Blackstone’s investment in Reese Witherspoon’s Hello Sunshine and Bumble's 2021 IPO. She has served on the boards of Bumble and Spanx (among others) and is a trustee of the Metropolitan Museum of Art. She has also held board or advisory roles with organizations including the Boys’ Club of New York and the One Love Foundation.

== Writing ==
=== The Tell ===
In March 2025, Griffin published the memoir The Tell, which describes her experiences processing trauma related to childhood sexual abuse. The book became a New York Times bestseller and was selected for Oprah's Book Club.

==== Controversy ====
In September 2025, The New York Times published an investigation that raised questions about aspects of the memoir. The article discussed the reliability of memories recovered during MDMA-assisted therapy, the lack of other reported similar accounts from Griffin’s school in Amarillo, Texas, and noted that a former classmate said some descriptions of abuse in the book were “eerily similar” to experiences the classmate said she had endured from a different teacher.

In March 2026, the former classmate (later identified in court filings as Joleene Altum) sued Griffin, her ghostwriter, and the publisher, alleging invasion of privacy, negligence, and infliction of emotional distress. She claimed that certain sexual assault incidents described in The Tell had happened to her rather than to Griffin.

In June 2026, Griffin filed a countersuit for defamation, asserting that the classmate’s public statements accusing her of being a “fraud and a thief” and of appropriating another person’s experiences were false. Griffin has maintained that the events described in the book are her own.
