= Adam Aron =

American businessman

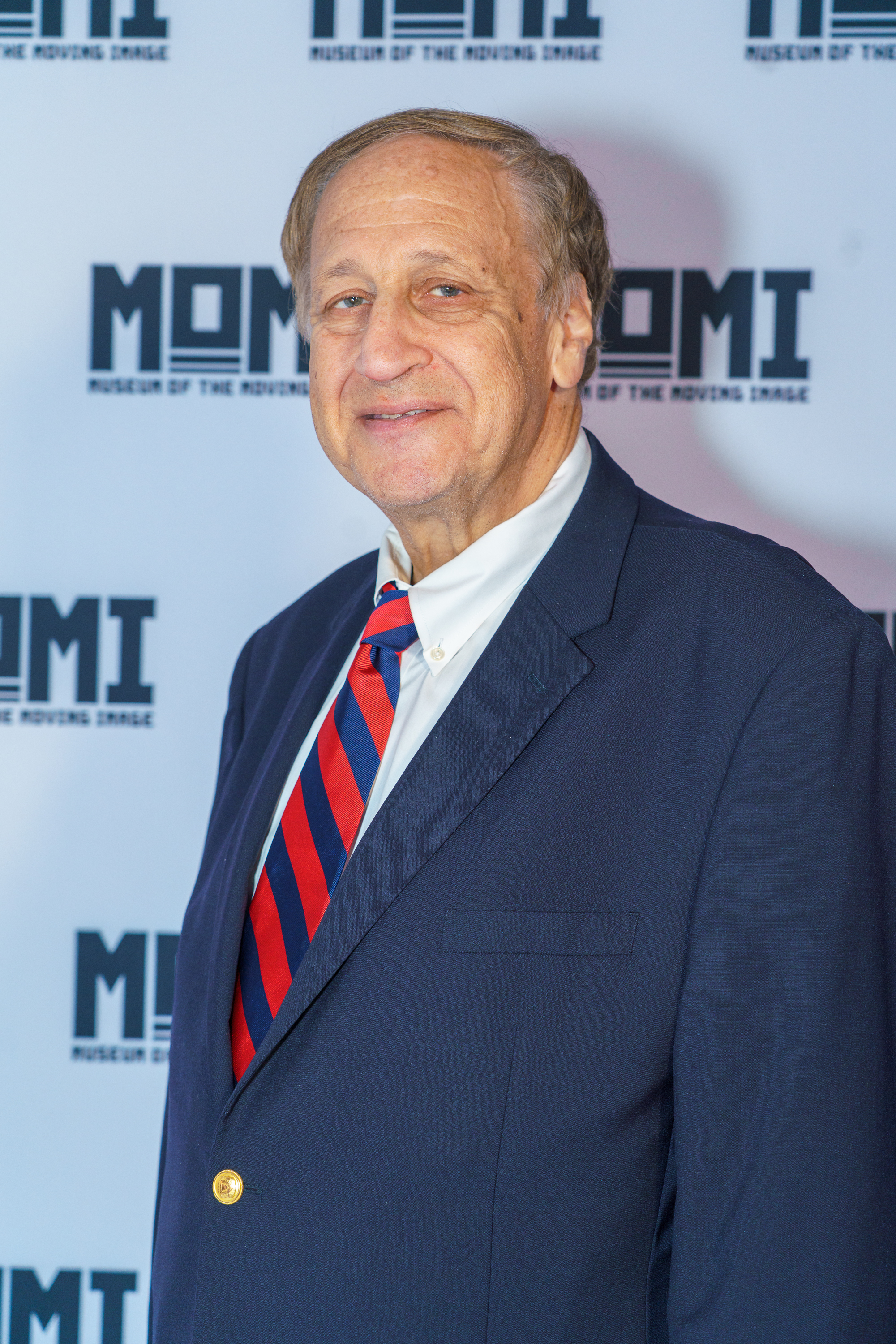
- Aron at the 40th Moving Image Awards in 2026
- Born: Adam Maximilian Aron; September 30, 1954 (age 71); Philadelphia, Pennsylvania, U.S.
- Education: Harvard University (BA, MBA)
- Occupations: President/CEO/Chairman, AMC Entertainment Holdings, Inc. and AMC Entertainment Inc.
- Term: 2015–present
- Spouse: Abbe Kahn (m. 1987)
- Children: 2

Adam Maximilian Aron (born September 30, 1954) is an American businessman and the chairman and CEO of AMC Entertainment Holdings, Inc. More recently, he became a co-owner of the Philadelphia 76ers, additionally serving as its CEO from 2011 to 2013. Aron had previously served as president and CEO of Norwegian Cruise Line, from 1993 to 1996, as well as chairman and CEO of Vail Resorts from 1996 to 2006, and continues to serve on the board of directors. In 2006, Aron formed a personal consultancy, World Leisure Partners, Inc.

== Biography ==
=== Early life and education ===
Born to a Jewish family, Aron graduated from Abington Senior High School in suburban Philadelphia, Pennsylvania, where he was friends with future Yale School of Management professor Jeffrey Sonnenfeld and future United States Secretary of Defense Ash Carter. He then attended Harvard University, where he graduated cum laude with a bachelor's degree in government, and an MBA with distinction from Harvard Business School.

=== Career ===
After graduating, Aron began working for Pan Am in 1979, where he was picked by executive Stephen Wolf to design the company's first frequent-flyer program. In the late 1980s, Aron was hired as a top marketing executive for Hyatt. Aron served as the CEO of Vail Resorts from 1996 to 2006. the second-largest ski resort operator worldwide. His contributions were hailed by Newsweek during his time at Vail with the headline: "Vail Resorts is a peak performer. CEO Adam Aron has transformed the U.S. ski industry." Aron also served as the CEO of Norwegian Cruise Line, then the fourth-largest cruise company in the world, and as Senior Vice President Marketing for United Airlines.

Aron was selected by the U.S. Secretary of Defense to participate in the Joint Civilian Orientation Conference in 2004, was appointed by the U.S. Secretary of Agriculture to serve on the board of directors of the National Forest Foundation from 2000 to 2006, and was a delegate to President Clinton's 1995 White House Conference on Travel and Tourism. He has more than 35 years of experience managing companies operating in the travel and leisure industries.

Throughout his career, Aron launched numerous award-winning loyalty programs, including for Western Airlines, Hyatt, United Airlines, Norwegian Cruise Line, Vail Resorts, the Philadelphia 76ers, and AMC. Ad Age magazine named him twice to its Ad Age 100 – the 100 best marketing executives in the US. In 2007, Travel Weekly magazine named him to its Club 33—the 33 most influential executives in travel and tourism worldwide.

=== AMC ===
Aron was named CEO of AMC movie theaters in late 2015. Aron was the subject of a number of high-profile pieces in magazines such as Variety that lauded him and his transformation strategy at AMC.

In 2021, Aron took the unusual step of publicly engaging with his investor base via Twitter. He follows about 2,600 AMC retail stockholders on the platform, and has about 300,000 followers as of August 2023.

=== Controversy ===
When AMC announced that most of their theaters would reopen in mid-July 2020, the initial announcement said masks would be recommended but not mandatory: "we are strongly encouraging our guests to wear masks all across the country, but not requiring it" and "We did not want to be drawn into a political controversy . . . We thought it might be counterproductive if we forced mask wearing on those people who believe strongly that it is not necessary." But after massive pushback from the public, Aron changed the policy to require masks: "This announcement prompted an intense and immediate outcry from our customers, and it is clear from this response that we did not go far enough on the usage of masks," Aron said.

=== Blackmail victim ===
Sakoya Blackwood texted Adam Aron in May 2022. He thought she was a ballerina who had done "unmentionable things" to him. He sent her explicit pictures, and she used these to blackmail him. Sakoya Blackwood pleaded guilty to cyberstalking in the summer of 2023.
