= Rosalind (given name) =

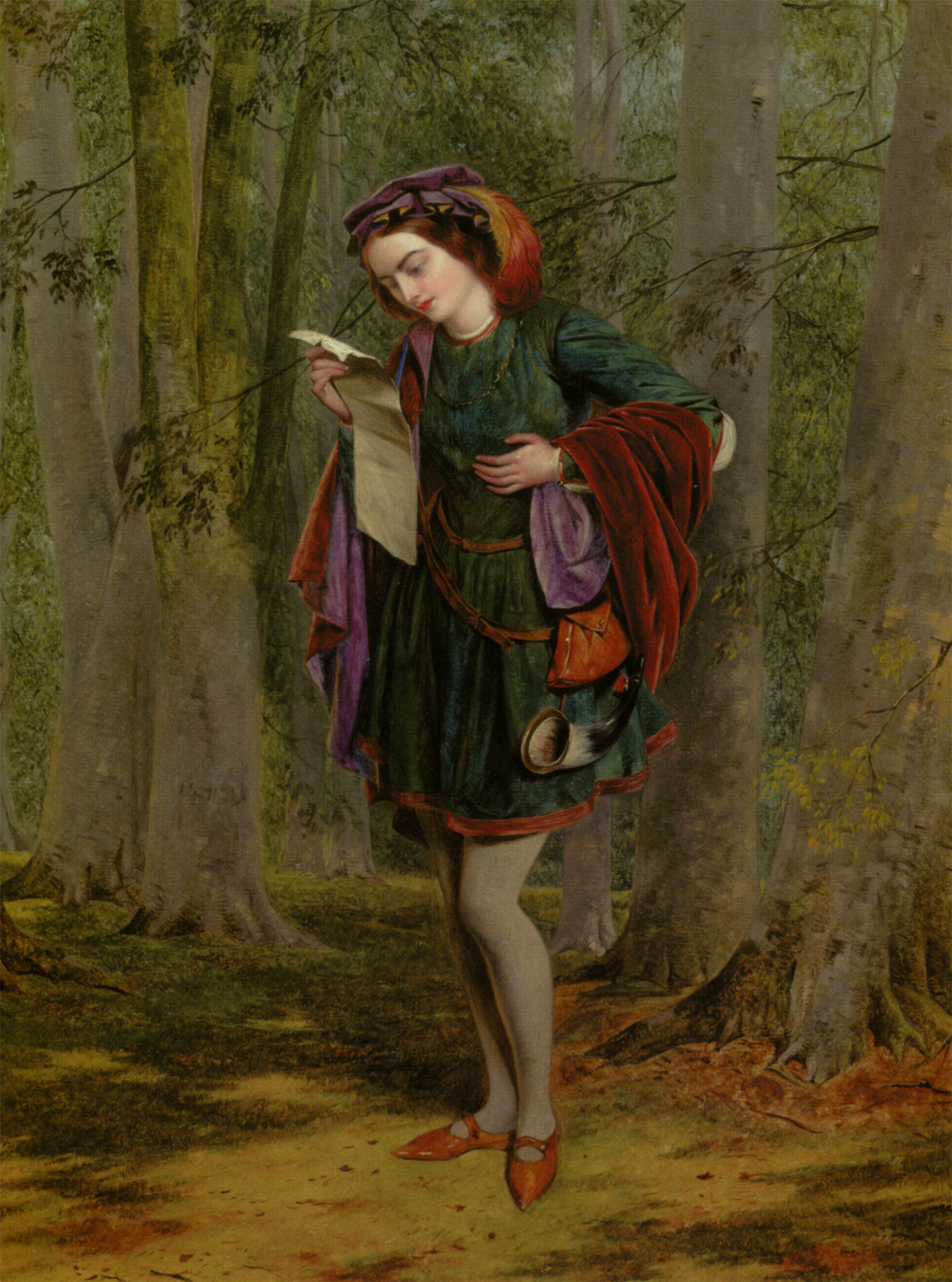
- Rosalind from William Shakespeare's As You Like It, by Henry Nelson O'Neil, 1856.
- Pronunciation: /ˈrɒz.ə.lɪnd, ˈroʊ.zə-/
- Gender: Feminine
- Language: German, Latin

Origin
- Meaning: Horse and tender; folk etymology pretty rose

Other names
- Short forms: Ros, Roz

Rosalind is a feminine given name derived from Old German word elements hros, or horse and lind, soft, tender. In the medieval era, it became associated with the Latin phrase rosa linda, or pretty rose. Notable people with the name include:

- Rosalind Archer, New Zealand petroleum engineer, academic
- Rosalind Ashford (born 1943), American singer, member of Martha and the Vandellas
- Rosalind Berman (died 2012), American politician
- Rosalind Blauer (1943–1973), Canadian economist
- Rosalind Brett, British Olympic swimmer
- Rosalind Brett (author), British writer of romance novels
- Rosalind Brown (headteacher) (1872–1964), British longtime headmistress of Oxford High School
- Rosalind Brown (novelist) (born 1987), British novelist
- Rosalind Cash (1938–1995), American singer and actress
- Rosalind Cassidy (1895–1980), American physical education professor
- Rosalind Chao (born 1957), American actress
- Rosalind Creasy (born 1939), American landscape designer and author
- Rosalind Eleazar (born 1988), English actress
- Rosalind Franklin (1920–1958), British physical chemist and crystallographer
- Rosalind Hackett, American historian
- Rosalind Halstead (born 1984), British actress
- Rosalind Hamilton, Duchess of Abercorn (1869–1958), British aristocrat
- Rosalind Hicks (1919–2005), British literary guardian and only child of Agatha Christie
- Rosalind Hill (1908–1997), English historian
- Rosalind Howells, Baroness Howells of St Davids (1931–2025), English Labour politician
- Rosalind Hursthouse (born 1943), New Zealand philosopher whose theories are centred on the abortion debate
- Rosalind Knight (1933–2020), English actress
- Rosalind Newman (born 1946), American choreographer
- Rosalind Peychaud (born 1948), New Orleans civic activist
- Rosalind Ridley (born 1949), British neuropsychologist
- Rosalind Rowe (1933–2015), English table tennis player
- Rosalind Russell (1907–1976), American actress
- Rosalind Savill (1951–2024), British art and museum curator
- Rosalind Fox Solomon (1930–2025), American photographer

== See also ==
- Rosalinda
- Rosalyn
- Rosaline
