= Rosalyn =

Rosalyn and the similar names Rosalynn and Roselyn are feminine given names. Notable people and characters with the names include:

== People named Rosalyn ==
- Rosalyn Baker (born 1946), American politician
- Rosalyn Barton (1938–2019), Australian diver
- Rosalyn Baxandall (1939–2015), American feminist historian
- Rosalyn W. Berne, American writer and ethicist
- Rosalyn Bird, Canadian politician
- Rosalyn Borden (1932–2003), American actress and singer
- Rosalyn Boulter (1917–1997), English actress
- Rosalyn Bryant (born 1956), American sprinter
- Rosalyn Dance (born 1948), American politician
- Rosalyn Benjamin Darling (born c.1950), American sociologist
- Rosalyn Deutsche, American art historian and critic
- Rosalyn Diprose, Australian philosopher
- Rosalyn Drexler (1926–2025), American artist and writer
- Rosalyn Fairbank (born 1960), South African tennis player
- Rosalyn Gold-Onwude (born 1987), American basketball analyst
- Rosalyn Henderson-Myers, American politician
- Rosalyn Higgins, Lady Higgins (born 1937), former President of the International Court of Justice
- Rosalyn Landor (born 1958), English actress
- Rosalyn Lawrence (born 1989), American canoeist
- Rosalyn Moran, Irish neuroscientist and psychiatrist
- Rosalyn Nandwa, (born 1968), Kenyan politician
- Rosalyn Scott (born 1950), American thoracic surgeon
- Rosalyn Terborg-Penn (1941–2018), American historian
- Rosalyn Tureck (1914–2003), American pianist and harpsichordist
- Rosalyn Sussman Yalow (1921–2011), American medical physicist, winner of the 1977 Nobel Prize in Physiology or Medicine

== People named Rosalynn ==
- Rosalynn Bliss (born 1975), American politician and social worker
- Rosalynn Carter (1927–2023), First Lady of the United States
- Rosalynn Sumners (born 1964), American figure skater

== People named Roselyn ==
- Roselyn Bakery, American bakery
- Roselyn Doria, Filipino volleyball player
- Roselyn P. Epps, (1930–2014) American pediatrician
- Roselyn Keo, American dancer
- Roselyn Ngissah, Ghanaian actress
- Roselyn Paul, Dominican politician
- Roselyn Rosier, Filipino volleyball player
- Roselyn Sánchez (born 1973), Puerto Rican actress and dancer
- Roselyn Silva, São Toméan luxury womenswear designer
- Roselyn Tso, American government official

== Fictional characters ==
- Rosalyn (Calvin and Hobbes), a minor character in Calvin and Hobbes
- Rosalyn, a character in the 1993 concept album Psychoderelict by Pete Townshend

== See also ==
- Rosalind (given name)
- Rosalinda (disambiguation)
- Rosaline
