= Marsh Supermarkets =

Grocery chain based in central Indiana (1931–2017)

Marsh Supermarkets, Inc.
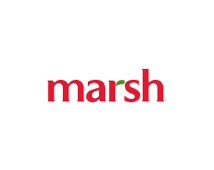
- Type: Private
- Industry: Retail (Grocery)
- Founded: 1931; 95 years ago in Muncie, Indiana
- Founder: Ermal Marsh
- Defunct: July 8, 2017; 9 years ago
- Fate: Chapter 7 bankruptcy Liquidation sale
- Headquarters: Indianapolis, Indiana
- Number of locations: 86 (December 31, 2013); 60 (May 1, 2017); 44 (June 1, 2017); None (July 8, 2017)
- Area served: Central Indiana, Western Ohio
- Key people: Tom O'Boyle, President and CEO; Don Marsh, Former President and CEO
- Products: Grocery
- Owner: Sun Capital Partners; JT Grocery Consulting
- Number of employees: 9,000
- Subsidiaries: O'Malia's Food Markets (2001–2017); Village Pantry (1966–2007)
- Website: marsh.net at the Wayback Machine (archived June 19, 2017)

Marsh Supermarkets was an American retail food chain headquartered in Indianapolis, Indiana, with a peak number of 86 stores in 2013 located throughout central Indiana and parts of western Ohio (including metropolitan Cincinnati). Its eventual parent company was Sun Capital Partners, headquartered in Boca Raton, Florida.

The company filed for bankruptcy on May 11, 2017, and was eventually liquidated. Topvalco, Inc., a subsidiary of supermarket competitor Kroger purchased 11 out of the 44 remaining stores while Ohio-based Fresh Encounter purchased another 15 stores. The unsold 18 stores were closed on or before July 8, 2017.

== History ==
=== 1931-1959: The Ermal Marsh years ===
Founded in 1931 in Muncie, the company went public in 1953 and grew to a maximum of 97 locations. Of the 97 locations, 69 were marketed as Marsh Supermarkets, three were O'Malia's Markets and 25 were the MainStreet Market banner. The company's founder, Ermal Marsh, was able to hold together his first store throughout the Great Depression and World War II. After the war ended, Ermal expanded his store into "Marsh Foodliners" and created the first supermarket in Muncie.

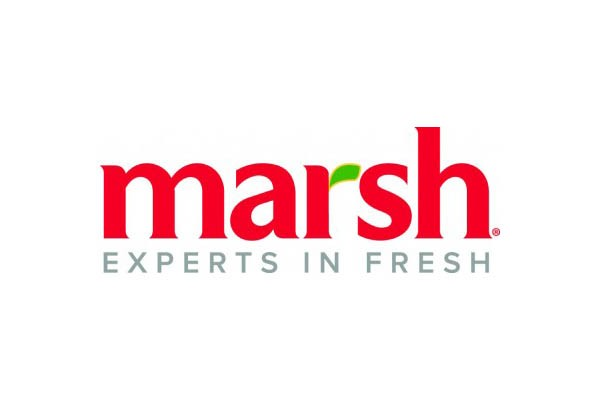
Marsh Logo 2012 to 2017

In 1952, Ermal had built the first warehouse distribution center for Marsh Supermarkets in Yorktown, Indiana. Within that same year, Marsh stores also introduced their own popular brand of ice cream. In 1953 when the company went public, Ermal had an operation of 16 Marsh Supermarkets.

In August 1956, the first store in the state of Ohio was opened through the acquisition of a pre-existing store in Van Wert, Ohio, and was quickly followed a few months later by the opening of a newly constructed store in Greenville, Ohio, in October.

Ermal Marsh died near the city of Logansport, Indiana in an August 1959 airplane crash; his brother Estel succeeded him as company president.

=== 1959-2006: The Estel and Don Marsh years ===
Under Estel Marsh, the name of the company was changed from Marsh Foodliners to Marsh Supermarkets in 1960.

Adapting to a rising trend, Marsh Supermarkets decided to open a new wave of convenience stores across Indiana. In 1966, the very first Village Pantry store and gas station was opened.

In 1968 as Marsh Supermarkets continued to grow, Estel Marsh was promoted to chairman of the board. This promotion cleared the way for Don Marsh, the then-thirty-year-old son of Ermal Marsh, to step forward as the new president. As president, Don was able to be a front-runner in Marsh's progression and adaptation to new technologies.

One of Marsh's most distinguishing features was its innovation and early adoption of retail technology. On June 26, 1974, a Marsh location in Troy, Ohio, became the first grocery store in the world to use a bar code scanner. The first item scanned was a ten-piece pack of gum. One of the first scanners used to scan bar codes at the supermarket can now be found in the Smithsonian National Museum of American History.

In early 1994, Marsh introduced a card-based customer loyalty program called the Marsh Fresh IDEA (Instant Discounts Electronically Applied) Card in which discounts are sometimes based on the cardholder's buying habits and are issued immediately for current purchases or as coupons for future visits. The first print mention of this program was in the April 1994 issue of the Indianapolis Recorder and the program was rolled to other marketing areas by November of the same year. In conjunction with this program, Marsh became the first supermarket chain in the region to offer a co-branded Visa card the following year. The Marsh Fresh IDEA Card was also used for obtaining discounts at selected outside partners, such as the Indianapolis Zoo, Ambassadair Travel, and White River State Park.

In 1991, major changes came to Marsh Supermarkets. The company headquarters moved to a new location along Interstate 69 in Fishers, Indiana. Marsh also released a new plan to re-format the stores, known as the "Supermarket of the Future" campaign. This new format made Marsh Supermarket stores open 24 hours, seven days a week. Also, a full-service pharmacy was implemented, along with a "help-yourself" style food court which contained food items ranging from salads to sushi, as well as a bagel shop and espresso bar. In store banks were also installed, as well as Fielding's Playhouse for toddlers, a New York Style Pizzeria, and an ATA travel center.

As a regional supermarket chain, Marsh tried to support regional suppliers by stocking regional favorites, such as Indianapolis-based Roselyn Bakery, which some of the national chain competitors tend to ignore.

In December 1995, Marsh debuted its Marsh Fresh Express Home Delivery service, which allowed customers to order groceries via phone or fax for store pickup or home delivery. Online ordering was added later. Marsh discontinued the service in February 2003, citing increasing costs of the third-party software on which the service depended.

Marsh eliminated their smaller Central Indiana competitors by purchasing the eight-unit O'Malia's Food Markets chain in 2001, the two-store chain Carter's Supermarkets in 2001, and in two separate purchases, three Mr. D's Fresh Food Markets stores in 2003. The O'Malia stores were kept as a separate banner that specialized in the upscale food trade. The Mr. D's stores were converted to the O'Malia banner, while both Carter stores were closed.

Marsh made attempts to expand beyond their Indiana-Ohio market to other areas such as Chicago in 2005, but were driven out by larger competition in less than a year of operation there.

In February 2006, Marsh Supermarkets announced that they were ending its longtime sponsorship of the Indiana State Fair due to the company's financial problems. The sponsorship was $175,000 per year, and it included naming rights for the fair's Grandstand, Blue Ribbon Pavilion and Agriculture-Horticulture Building. The Marsh name remained on the Blue Ribbon Pavilion as late as 2015 when the Indiana State Fair was able to recruit Elements Financial as a new sponsor to replace Marsh.

Citing increased competition, Marsh announced on November 29, 2005, that it had engaged Merrill Lynch to investigate the possible sale of the company. In April 2006 the company signed a letter of intent to be purchased by an affiliate of Sun Capital Partners, a Florida-based investment firm that specializes in leveraged buyouts. The deal would allow Sun Capital to purchase all outstanding Marsh shares for $11.16 per share, for a total of approximately $88 million.

=== 2006-2016: The Sun Capital years ===
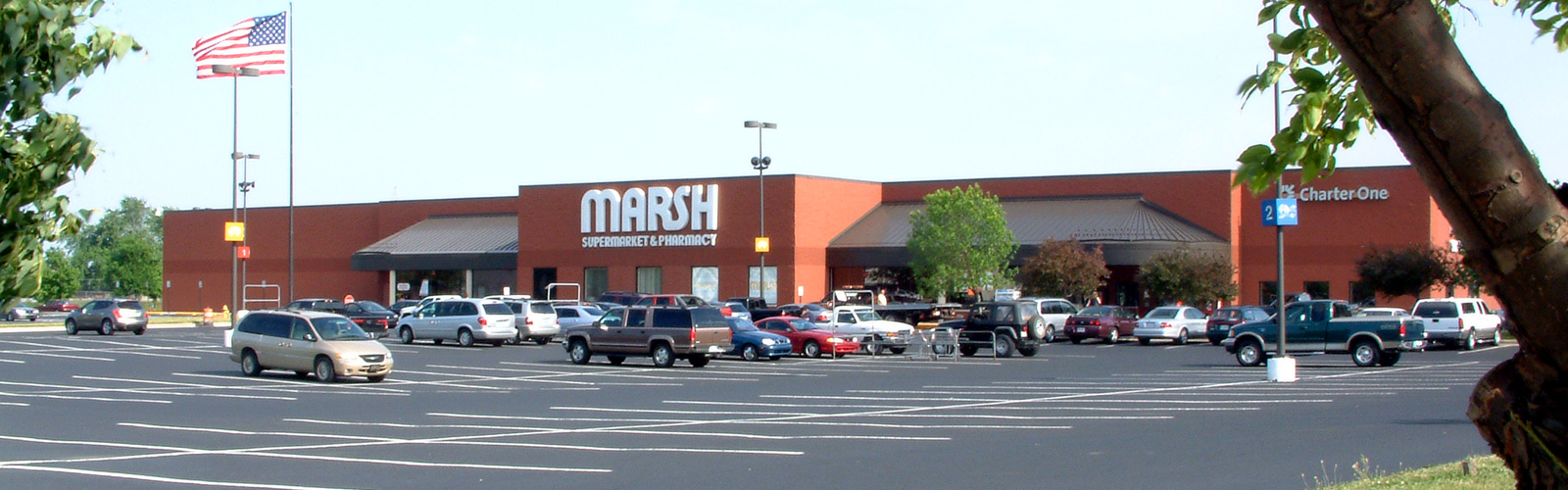
Marsh store #47 in Lafayette, Indiana, 2007

Marsh logo from 1989 (or earlier) –2012

On September 27, 2006, MSH Supermarkets, Inc., an affiliate of Sun Capital, completed the acquisition of Marsh Supermarkets, Inc. (Nasdaq: MARSA) (Nasdaq: MARSB) (Marsh) for a total purchase price of approximately $325 million (~$485 million in 2024). Marsh once again became a private company 53 years after it went public. Frank Lazaran was appointed president and CEO of Marsh, as a result of Don Marsh's previously announced resignation. At the time of acquisition, Marsh had operated 69 stores as Marsh supermarkets, 38 stores as LoBill Foods stores, eight stores as O'Malia Food Markets, 154 stores as Village Pantry convenience stores, and two stores as Arthur's Fresh Market stores in Indiana, Illinois and western Ohio. The company also operated Crystal Food Services; Primo Banquet Catering and Conference Centers; Floral Fashions; McNamara Florist and Enflora.

All non-core subsidiaries and excess real estate resulting from closing poorly performing stores were immediately sold off. In June 2007, Sun Capital Partners announced that they would be splitting Village Pantry Convenience Stores from Marsh. Village Pantry now reports directly to Sun Capital Partners. LoBill Foods stores were converted into Marsh Hometown Markets around the same time as the Village Pantry separation. Under Lazaran, Marsh replaced most of their well known Marsh store branded products with the higher profit but lesser known Food Club and Valu Time private label brands from Topco. Sun Capital attempted to sell Marsh in December 2009, but withdrew the offer 8 months later when they were unable to find a buyer. In August 2011, Sun Capital eliminated Marsh's warehouses and internal distribution system and replaced it with an outside third-party supplier.

In May 2011, Frank Lazaran departed as the Marsh President and CEO for family reasons. Sun Capital brought in Joe Kelley as the new president and CEO. Joe Kelley brought over 25 years of experience to Marsh from his past positions at Purity Supreme, A&P, Bozzuto's, Inc., Adams Hometown Markets and Price Chopper Supermarkets. Kelley left in May 2012 to become president of Stop & Shop's New England Division. Marsh COO Bill Holsworth was appointed as interim CEO as Sun Capital began conducting a nationwide search for a permanent CEO. The search ended in November, 2012, when Marsh named Thomas R. O’Boyle Jr. as the company's new chairman, president and chief executive officer. In May 2014, Marsh opened their first store since they were acquired by Sun Capital. During this time, Marsh began serving hot Noble Roman's branded pizzas at stores large enough to have in-store cafes.

In January 2014, the company announced that it was closing a total of eight stores by the end of the month in Indianapolis, Muncie, Speedway, and Franklin in Indiana and also in Franklin, Ohio. After the closings, there were 78 stores remaining in Indiana and Ohio.

Taking advantage of new wearable technology that some customers may have with them when they enter a Marsh store, Marsh had teamed up with inMarket in January 2015 to install iBeacons in all of its 75 stores to push interactive alerts and other content to Apple Watch users while the customer walk the aisles in their supermarkets.

In a move to counter similar services that were just beginning to be offered by Kroger and online competitors such as Peapod, Marsh began to offer home deliveries via the web in Indianapolis and other selected areas by teaming up with Instacart in August 2015.

In December 2015, Marsh announced plans to open 13 new stores by 2018 while updating 52 of the chain's 73 existing stores. Two months later, in February 2016, it was announced that Marsh was planning to return to Fort Wayne for the first time in a decade by building a new modern store on the site of a vacant out-dated retail building. At the time of the announcement, Marsh had 78 stores in Indiana and Ohio. Marsh withdrew from the project the following year without a comment.

In July 2016, Marsh replaced C&S with SuperValu as their primary supplier.

In October 2016, it was reported that Marsh was trying to sell its corporate headquarters building to get some quick cash by using a standard sale-and-leaseback procedure.

In December 2016, Marsh released their first iPhone and Android mobile apps that help customers obtain discounts while they shop. During the same month, Marsh removed Cosmopolitan magazine from checkout racks from all of their then 72 stores in Indiana and Ohio. Marsh had no comment for their action. The National Center on Sexual Exploitation applauded their new policy.

=== 2017: A challenging year ===
In January 2017, several news outlets had reported that Marsh was having trouble paying several landlords and contractors with the total amount owed exceeding $200 thousand.

In February 2017, the Indianapolis Business Journal reported that "private equity investors in Indianapolis suspect Sun already has made a tidy profit on Marsh, as a result of dividends and windfalls from selling real estate." At the same time, by under-investing in the supermarket chain, Sun Capital had made Marsh "too far gone" to attract a buyout offer from a competing chain.

In March 2017, it was reported that two stores had been closed since the beginning of the year and two more expected to be closed in April. At the time of the filing of the news reports in mid-March, there were 67 stores opened in Indiana and Ohio. Several landlords and other creditors had filed lawsuits seeking payment. A Forbes magazine columnist asked if the company was "headed for the dumpster".

In April 2017, Marsh announced that they plan to close eight under performing stores in Indiana and two in Ohio by the end of May to leave 53 operating stores. Upon hearing the latest announcement of store closings that occurred shortly after the store closing announcement during the previous months of 2017, a writer for the Indianapolis Star asks if the most recent announcement is just the beginning of the end for the company.

At the beginning of May 2017, Marsh sold all of their in-store pharmacy records in both Indiana and Ohio to CVS Pharmacy for an undisclosed amount and closed the pharmacies. As a result of this action, Marsh stores in Indiana were no longer allowed to sell hard liquor due to an obscure Indiana law that required grocery stores to have pharmacies in order to sell hard liquor. It was later discovered that Marsh had received $38 million from CVS for the drug inventory and customers' prescription records along with an agreement that forbids a potential buyer from operating a prescription-issuing pharmacy at those locations for five years.

The Indianapolis Business Journal also reported that Krispy Kreme had filed a lawsuit against Marsh claiming non-payment for deliveries of doughnuts worth over $100,000.

On May 4, 2017, Marsh announced the closings of 9 additional Central Indiana stores that were to be closed by the end of May.

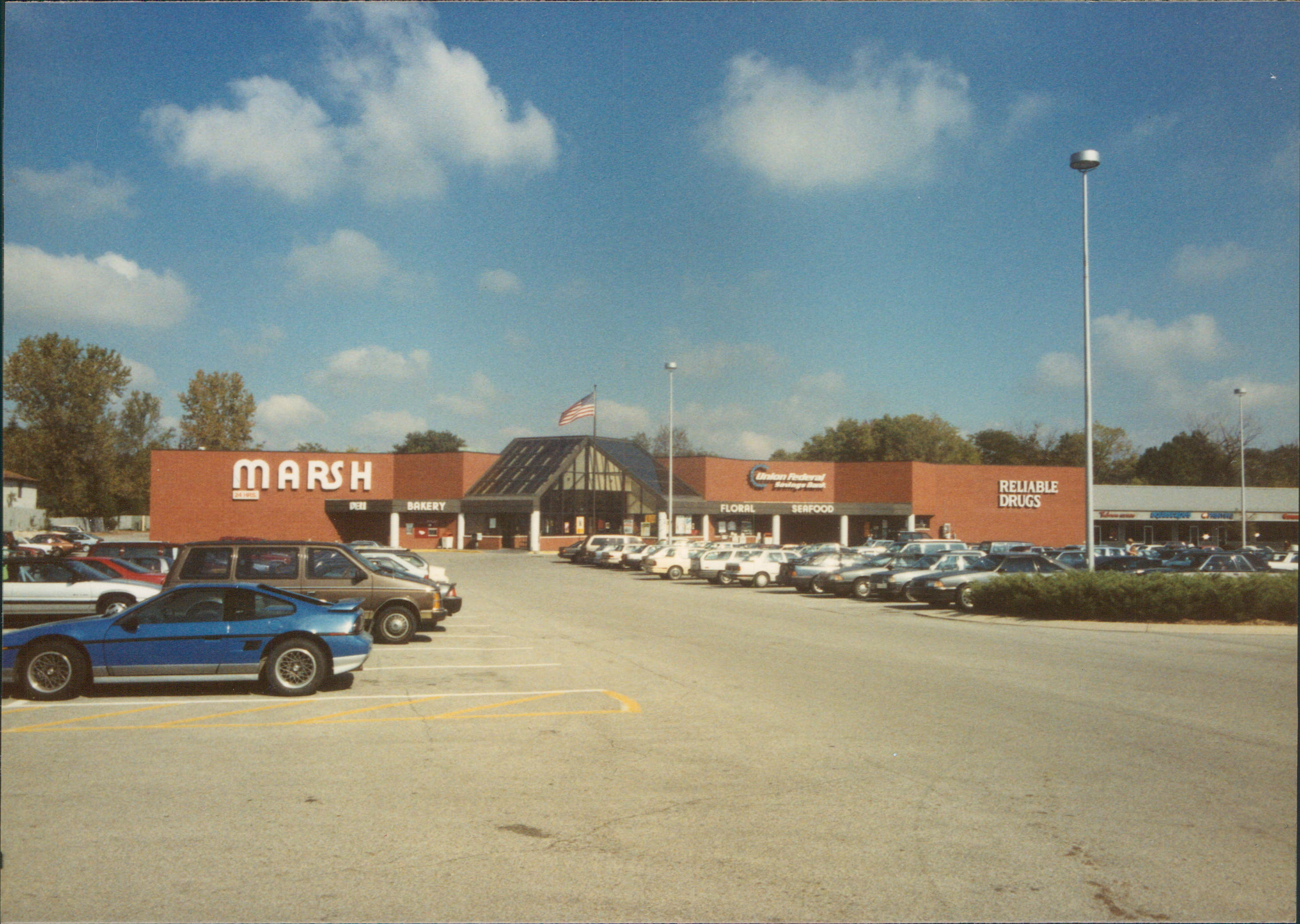
Marsh store in the Nora district of Indianapolis during the late 1980s or early 1990s. It was one of the stores that had closed on April 8, 2017.

On May 9, 2017, Marsh announced that unless a buyer of some of the stores, or all stores, was found, all 44 remaining stores would close within 60 days of the announcement. This announcement followed the one that Marsh had made the day before in which they had announced the closing of 16 additional stores in Indianapolis as well as Bloomington, Brownsburg, Carmel, Greenwood, Kokomo, Marion, Muncie, and Zionsville by July. Marsh had also notified the Indiana Department of Workforce Development of the impending mass terminations as required under the federal Worker Adjustment and Retraining Notification Act.

=== Bankruptcy ===
Sun Capital Partners quietly sold controlling interest in Marsh to Delaware-based JT Grocery Consulting LLC on March 24, 2017, the same day JT Grocery Consulting was formed. Among Sun Capital's problems was a pension fund so severely underfunded that federal intervention was being considered. Two months later, Marsh filed for Chapter 11 bankruptcy protection. In its bankruptcy filing, the company estimated it had up to 49 creditors, estimated assets of up to $50,000 and liabilities of $50 million to $100 million. The largest claim was $61 million owed to one of the two employee pension funds. Suppliers that were owed money included Keebler, PepsiCo (Pepsi and Frito Lay) and Coca-Cola. The treasurer's offices for Delaware and Hamilton counties were also listed for being owed unpaid back taxes. At the time of the filing, Marsh operated a total of 60 stores, 54 in Indiana and six in Ohio, with 16 of those stores scheduled to closed by the end of May. On June 15, 2017, Marsh converted its Chapter 11 bankruptcy to Chapter 7, with plans to close all 18 stores by July 8.

=== Aftermath ===
Holding companies controlled by Kroger and Ohio-based Fresh Encounter purchased 26 of the 44 remaining stores in June; a contractual dispute with CVS Health resulted in a lawsuit, but the bankruptcy court permitted the sale to proceed, as CVS withdrew its objections after receiving satisfactory assurances from Kroger. The company then began liquidation sales at its remaining stores.

Generative Growth II, LLC, operator of Fresh Encounter, purchased two stores in Indianapolis, and single stores in New Palestine, Pendleton, Columbus, Elwood, Greensburg, Hartford City, Marion, Richmond, and Tipton in Indiana. In Ohio, Generative Growth II purchased stores in Eaton, Middletown, Troy, and Van Wert. The total number that were purchased was 15 in the two state region.

Topvalco, Inc., a Kroger subsidiary, purchased two stores each in the cities of Indianapolis, Muncie, Bloomington, and Zionsville; and single stores each in the cities of Brownsburg, Fishers, and Greenwood. All eleven stores that were purchased were located in Central Indiana. In contrast to Generative Growth II, Topvalco elected to not purchase the food inventory and only purchase the store leases. On July 19, Kroger took possession of their eleven stores had announced their plans for only seven of them. Both locations in Zionsville, a location in Brownsburg, and one out of two locations each in Indianapolis and Bloomington would be converted to full Kroger stores (total of five) while the two Muncie locations would converted to the Pay Less Super Markets brand. In May 2018, speculation started that several of the Kroger-acquired buildings were only bought to keep competition from coming in to Marsh buildings near existing Kroger stores, fueled by a store in Brownsburg, Indiana that was expected to become a Kroger, instead going up for lease.

The 18 stores that were closed and liquidated included four Marsh stores in Indianapolis; two Marsh stores each in Kokomo and Muncie; single Marsh stores in Beech Grove, Carmel, Noblesville, Anderson, Connersville, Lafayette, Logansport, and West Lafayette. Also included in the list of 18 closed stores were the lone O'Malia's in Carmel and the only unpurchased Ohio location in Hamilton, Ohio.

On June 15, Marsh stopped new food shipments to and started liquidation sales at the 18 stores scheduled to be closed and the 11 stores that were purchased by Topvalco.

In late August 2017, Michael Needler Jr., CEO of Fresh Encounter, Inc. and a partner in Generative Growth, announced that 14 of the 15 stores that it had purchased would be renamed Needler's Fresh Market while the store in Van Wert, Ohio, would be renamed Chief Supermarket because of its close proximity to stores already flying that banner. The company would try to keep the stores open while the stores were being rebranded and expected the conversions at each store to be completed by the end of October.

At about the same time, Kroger said that it planned to spend $20 million to renovate and reopen seven of the eleven stores that it had purchased. No information was given when these stores would reopen.

The Washington Post reported in 2018 that the gradual sell-off of the company "allowed Sun Capital and its investors to recover their money and then some, the company entered bankruptcy leaving unpaid more than $80 million (~$98.1 million in 2024) in debts to workers' severance and pensions". In the same article, GPM Investments also accused Sun Capital of "stripping [Marsh Supermarkets and its affiliates] of more than $100 million that should have been used to resolve the pension obligation".

== O'Malia's Food Markets ==
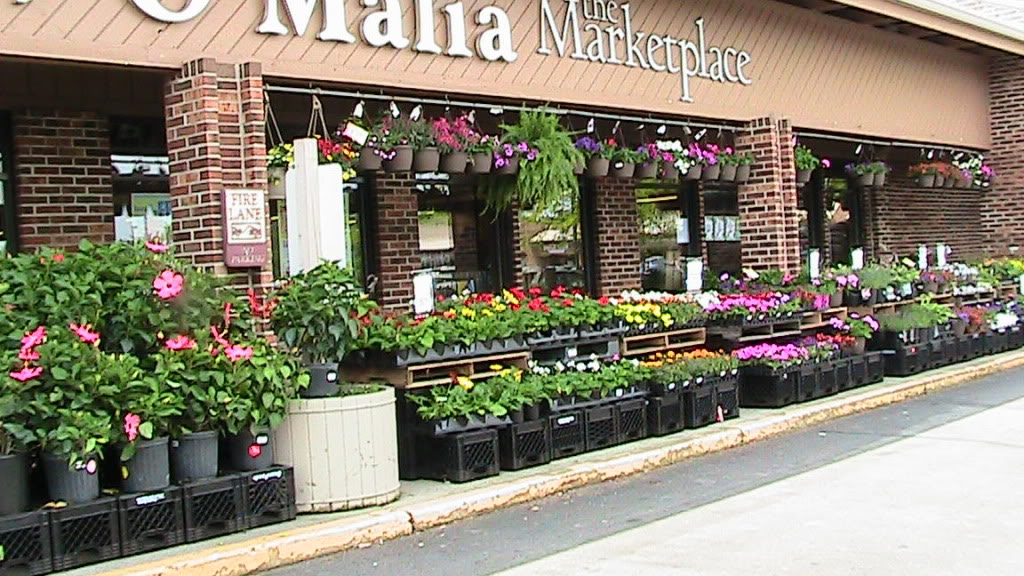
The final O'Malia's Food Market at 4755 E. 126th Street in Carmel, Indiana in 2010

The first O'Malia's Food Market opened in 1966 near 106th Street and College Avenue in an area of Hamilton County by Joe O'Malia. There were eight O'Malia's Food Market when O'Malia sold the company to Marsh Supermarkets in June 2001. Marsh kept the O'Malia's banner as their upscale banner. In January and July 2003, Marsh purchased three Mr. D's Fresh Food Markets in two separate deals and converted all three stores to the O'Malia's banner. Under Sun Capital Partners, the O'Malia's stores were slowly closed.

There were five O'Malia's stores left by mid-2009. Since that time, four stores were closed in October 2009 (Indianapolis), March 2010 (Carmel), November 2014 (Bloomington), and October 2016 (Indianapolis) to leave a lone store in Carmel. The lone O'Malia was included in the list of stores that were to be closed and liquidated starting on June 15, 2017. The store had closed by July 8, 2017.

== See also ==
- List of defunct retailers of the United States
