= Celia Haig-Brown =

Euro-Canadian scholar (born 1947)

Celia Haig-Brown (born in 1947) is a Euro-Canadian scholar, educator, and filmmaker covering topics on Indigenous histories, educational experiences, and the ongoing impacts of colonial systems in Canada. She is a professor emeritus and Senior Scholar at York University's Faculty of Education. She lives in Toronto.

Haig-Brown became interested in the experiences of the Canadian Indian residential school system through conversations with Indigenous friends. This led her to interview survivors of the Kamloops Indian Residential School and their families, documenting their stories in books and films.

== Family and early life ==
Celia Haig-Brown was raised in Campbell River, British Columbia, in the Haig-Brown Heritage House, operated by the Museum at Campbell River. She is the youngest of four children born to Roderick Haig-Brown, an author, conservationist, and magistrate, and Ann Elmore Haig-Brown, a teacher and librarian. Ann Elmore Haig-Brown was also active in several community organizations and operated a safe house for women fleeing abusive relationships. In recognition of her contributions to the community, the City of Campbell River declared May 3 as Ann Elmore Haig-Brown Day in 2008. Celia Haig-Brown's siblings are Valerie Haig-Brown, Alan Haig-Brown, and Mary Haig-Brown.

In 1968 Celia Haig-Brown earned her Bachelor of Arts from the University of British Columbia, with majors in zoology and English. She soon moved to Williams Lake, British Columbia, where she worked as a teacher's assistant, which sparked her interest in education. In Kamloops, Haig-Brown taught for five years in Kamloops secondary schools and coordinated the Native Indian Teacher Education Program (now known as the Indigenous Teacher Education Program) until 1986.

== Academic career ==
Celia Haig-Brown completed a Master of Arts in Curriculum and Instruction and then a PhD in Social Foundations of Educational Policy at the University of British Columbia. Her work has focused on Indigenous education and the history of residential schools in Canada.

From 1996 to 2002, Haig-Brown served as an associate professor across multiple faculties at York University, including the Faculty of Education, the Faculty of Graduate Studies, and the School of Women's Studies. Between 1999 and 2003, she was director of the Graduate Program in Language, Culture, and Teaching at York University's Faculty of Graduate Studies. Haig-Brown was an Associate Member in the Department of Curriculum, Teaching and Learning at the Ontario Institute for Studies in Education (OISE) at the University of Toronto from 1997 to 2008.

From 2015 to 2020, she served as the Associate Vice-President of Research at York University. Prior to this role, she was the Associate Dean of Research & Professional Learning in York University's Faculty of Education from 2013 to 2015 and served as Chair of Senate from 2009 to 2010.

As a professor at York, Haig-Brown supported Indigenous education initiatives. She has worked with Indigenous communities and educators to promote culturally responsive teaching practices. Haig-Brown emphasizes building long-term relationships with Indigenous communities and ensuring their voices guide her work.

Her research includes documentary film that has been shown at the Native American Film and Video Festival in New York and the Irvine International Film Festival in California.

== Works ==
=== Books ===
- Haig-Brown, Celia (1988). Resistance and Renewal: Surviving the Indian Residential School. Vancouver: Tillicum Library.
- Haig-Brown, Celia (1995). Taking Control: Power and Contradiction in First Nations Adult Education. Vancouver: University of British Columbia Press.
- Haig-Brown, Celia; Hodgson-Smith, Kathy L.; Regnier, Robert; Archibald, Jo-Ann (1997). “Making the Spirit Dance Within”: Joe Duquette High School and an Aboriginal Community. Halifax: Lorimer Press.
- Haig-Brown, Celia; Nock, David A. (eds.) (2006). With Good Intentions: Euro-Canadian and Aboriginal Relations in Colonial Canada. Vancouver: University of British Columbia Press.
- Haig-Brown, Celia; Gottfriedson, Garry; Fred, Randy; KIRS survivors (2022). Tsqelmucwílc: Kamloops Indian Residential School—Resistance and a Reckoning. Vancouver: Arsenal Pulp Press.

=== Filmography ===
- Pelq’ilc: Coming Home (with Helen Haig-Brown) (2009)
- Cowboys, Indians and Education: Regenerating Secwepemc Culture (with Helen Haig-Brown) (2012)
- Listen to the Land (2018)

== Recognition ==
- 2022 Fellow of the Royal Society of Canada
- 2009 Ted T. Aoki Award for Distinguished Service in Canadian Curriculum Studies from the Canadian Association for Curriculum Studies.
- 1989 Roderick Haig-Brown Regional Prize
