= Rosalind =

Rosalind or Rosalinde may refer to:

- Rosalind (given name)

== Arts and entertainment ==
- Rosalind (As You Like It), a fictional character in William Shakespeare's play As You Like It
- Rosalind, the object of Colin Clout's love in Edmund Spenser's poem The Shepheardes Calender
- "Rosalind", a poem by Alfred, Lord Tennyson
- Rosalind, a play by J. M. Barrie
- Rosalind Starling, from hack-and-slash zombie video game Lollipop Chainsaw
- Rosalind Lutece, in the BioShock video game series

== Places ==
- Rosalind, Alberta, Canada
- Rosalind Bank, a completely submerged bank in the western Caribbean Sea
- Rosalind (moon), a moon of Uranus
- 900 Rosalinde, an asteroid

== Ships ==
- HMS Rosalind, ships of the Royal Navy
- Rosalind (1799 ship), a slave ship
- Rosalind (1879 ship), sunk by a mine off of Sweden in 1918
- Rosalind (1890 ship), a steam cargo liner wrecked off of Nova Scotia in 1914

== Other uses ==
- Rosalind (education platform), a platform and web project for learning bioinformatics through problem solving
- Rosalind (harness horse) (foaled 1933), the 1936 Hambletonian winner

== See also ==
- Rosalinda (disambiguation)
- Rosalyn
