= Rosalind Brown =

Rosalind Brown is the name of:

- Rosalind Brown (headteacher) (1872–1964), British longtime headmistress of Oxford High School
- Rosalind Brown (novelist) (born 1987), British novelist

== See also ==
- Rosalind Bengelsdorf, American painter, art critic and educator, also known as Rosalind Browne
