= Rosalinda (given name) =

- Pronunciation: Roh-zuh-LINDUH
- Gender: Female

Origin
- Origin: Old German/Castilian
- Meaning: Gentle Horse, Beautiful Rose

Other names
- Alternative spelling: Roselinda
- Related names: Rosalind, Rosalinde

Rosalinda or Roselinda is a female given name of Old German origin, and is also thought to be a name of Spanish origin. It is both a combination of the name Linda and Rosa, the Spanish form of Rose, and a name from which the diminutive Linda arose. In Old German, the name meant horse serpent. With Linda meaning beautiful in Spanish and Rosa meaning rose, the name could be taken to mean Beautiful Rose.

People with the given name Rosalinda include:

- Rosalinda Asuncion Vicente (born 1943), Associate Justice of the Philippine Court of Appeals
- Rosalinda Baldoz, Filipina politician
- Rosalinda Celentano (born 1968), Italian actress
- Rosalinda Cannavò (born 1992), Italian actress
- Rosalinda Galán (born 1990) Spanish singer and actress
- Rosalinda Galli (born 1949), Italian voice actress
- Rosalinda González Valencia, Mexican businesswoman and suspected money launderer
- Roselinda Soipan Tuiya, Kenyan politician

== See also ==
- Rosalind (disambiguation)
- Rosalyn
