= Rodger Krouse =

American businessperson (born 1961)

- Born: Rodger Russell Krouse; 1961 (age 64–65)
- Education: University of Pennsylvania (B.S.)
- Occupation: Investor
- Known for: Co-founder of private equity firm Sun Capital Partners, Inc.
- Spouse: Hillary Kim Miller
- Children: 3

Rodger Russell Krouse (born 1961) is an American businessperson who co-founded Sun Capital Partners, Inc., an American investment firm based in Boca Raton, Florida, United States.

== Early life and education ==
Krouse was born to a Jewish family. He received a Bachelor of Science degree in economics with a concentration in the Chinese language from the Wharton School of the University of Pennsylvania. At Wharton, he was a friend of his future business partner Marc Leder.

== Career ==
After he finished university, he worked at Lehman Brothers in their corporate investment banking unit in New York City, eventually rising to the position of Senior Vice President. In 1995, Krouse left Lehman and co-founded the private equity firm Sun Capital Partners with Leder.

With the goal of it becoming a regional private equity firm, they located their company in Boca Raton, Florida thinking that they would get advance notice of potential acquisitions in the Southeast before their competitors in New York. Locating the firm in Florida did not afford the advantage they expected, and for the first two years were repeatedly outbid by large New York firms. Although they did not complete any deals for the first two years, they were able to keep afloat thanks to established contacts at several large private equity groups from their time at Lehman Brothers, especially Bain Capital (which was then run by Mitt Romney). Their first acquisition was a distressed company called Atlas Papers, and thereafter the company focused on underperforming and distressed companies exclusively. Sun Capital differentiated itself from other turnaround companies due to its resource intensive platform utilizing a comparatively larger pool of employed professionals to supervise and manage its acquisitions (although also charging a higher fee). Following this strategy, the business reached $10 billion in assets and 165,000 employees in 2008 just before the market crash. After seeing at least ten of their portfolio companies enter bankruptcy in 2009, they retrenched. As of July 2013, Sun Capital had $8 billion in invested assets.

Krouse served as vice president and vice chairman of Northland Cranberries since 2001; and as vice president and director of Loud Technologies, Inc. since 2003. In the past he served as co-chairman and director of Labtec, Inc; and as director of World Air Holdings.

Krouse believes that what differentiates Sun from other private equity firms is its focus on fixing a failed company's culture: "Our revelation came in 2008, when all our companies were hit hard and we saw (that those) with strong cultures had the best financial results." "Businesses are a collection of assets...and people. Unify them with a common purpose and you get success." In 2013, he was one of the recipients of the 2013 Leadership Award for Outstanding Achievements in M&A by The M&A Advisor.

== Political contributions ==
In 2012, Krouse personally donated $250,000 to Restore Our Future and $60,800 to Romney Victory, Inc, both PACs supporting Mitt Romney's run for president. He served as a co-chair on Romney's Florida finance team. Krouse donated to many prominent Republicans running for office in 2012 including: Connie Mack IV, Adam Hasner, Scott Brown, Randy Altschuler, Bob Corker, Linda Lingle, Jeff Flake, Josh Mandel, and Ted Deutch.

== Personal life ==
In 1991, he married Hillary Kim Miller and has three sons. Krouse lost an undisclosed sum of his own money that he had invested with Bernard L. Madoff. He speaks Chinese. The business partners are said to complement each other with Leder the outspoken optimist and Krouse the measured realist.
