= Blauer =

Blauer is a surname. Notable people with the surname include:

- Harold Blauer (1910–1953), American tennis player and Project MKUltra experiment subject
- Rosalind Blauer (1943–1973), Canadian economist

== See also ==
- Lauer
