= Roderick Haig-Brown =

Canadian writer and conservationist (1908–1976)

- Born: Roderick Langmere Haig-Brown; 21 February 1908; Lancing, England
- Died: 9 October 1976 (aged 68); Campbell River, Canada
- Occupation: Writer
- Spouse: Ann
- Children: Valerie, Mary, Alan, Celia
- Relatives: Alan Haig-Brown (father)
- Writing career
- Genres: non-fiction, fiction
- Subjects: nature, fly-fishing, youth
- Notable works: The Western Angler, A River Never Sleeps, Fisherman's Fall, Measure of the Year, Saltwater Summer

Roderick Langmere Haig-Brown (February 21, 1908 – October 9, 1976) was a Canadian writer and conservationist.

== Early life ==
Haig-Brown was born in Lancing, Sussex, England on February 21, 1908. His father, Alan Haig-Brown, was a teacher and a prolific writer, the author of hundreds of articles and poems on sports, the military, and educational issues in various periodicals. Alan was also an officer in the British Army during World War I. In 1918 he was killed in action in France. Roderick had a high regard for his father and describes him in an essay entitled “Alan Roderick Haig Brown” as “an Edwardian: one of the young, the strong, the brave and the fair who had faith in their nation, their world and themselves” (27). Roderick's paternal grandfather, William, was headmaster of the Charterhouse School for thirty-three years.

Roderick's mother, Violet Mary Pope, was one of fifteen children of Alfred Pope, a wealthy Dorset brewer. After the war ended Roderick, his mother and his two sisters went to live with her family. His grandfather Pope was an industrious man with very strong Victorian values of “service, fair play, decency and acceptance of the obligations that follow with the privilege of class and education” (Robertson 6). He was a friend of Thomas Hardy and took young Roderick to tea there on at least one occasion. Roderick later noted in his essay “Hardy’s Dorset” that he regretted not having elicited more information from Hardy about being a writer, but he was sixteen then and was passionate about fishing and shooting. Life on his grandfather's country estate on the Frome River was more fascinating to him than “the past or its old men” (“Hardy’s Dorset” 43). His many uncles loved sport and taught him to fish and shoot, but it was a family friend, Major Greenhill, who served as Roderick's sporting mentor and taught him both the skills and the ethics of sportsmanship. The estate's gamekeepers, particularly "Old Fox", introduced him to the importance of conservation and the complexity of the environment. In 1921 Roderick entered Charterhouse where his grandfather Haig-Brown had been headmaster.

His physical and social childhood environment contributed, according to biographer Anthony Robertson, to Roderick's code of conduct. Throughout his life he adhered to an ideal balanced between reason and passion, an ideal infused with knowledge and tempered by responsibility, decency and fair play. This code “invoke[d] a mental and physical discipline that [went] beyond making a successful catch or kill; its central virtue [was] knowledge, intimate and thorough, transcending pursuit” (8).

== Writing career ==
Haig-Brown found his way to British Columbia, Canada through a series of unexpected events. After he was expelled from Charterhouse School for drinking and sneaking out, he joined his father's regiment for a short while, but found that army life was too restrictive. The family decided that the British Colonial Civil Service might be a more agreeable alternative but he was too young to write the exams. He went, in the meantime to Seattle, Washington at the invitation of an uncle who had married a Seattle woman, promising his mother he would come back when he was eligible for the civil service. He worked at a logging camp in Washington, then crossed the border to Canada because his U.S. visa had expired. He remained in British Columbia for three years to work at Nimpkish Lake on Vancouver Island as a logger, a commercial fisherman and an occasional guide to visiting anglers. He returned to England in 1931 and enjoyed the fast-paced life of London. But images of British Columbia haunted him while he wrote his first book, Silver: The Life of an Atlantic Salmon (1931) as well as part of Pool and Rapid (1932). He returned to BC at the end of the year and planned his third book, Panther (1934). He married Ann Elmore of Seattle after publishing Panther, and the couple settled on the banks of the Campbell River where they lived for the rest of their lives, raising three daughters and a son.

From the year of his return to British Columbia to 1976, the year of his death, Roderick Haig-Brown published twenty-three books (five more were published posthumously), wrote numerous articles and essays, and created several series of talks and historical dramas for the Canadian Broadcasting Corporation. He is most famous internationally for his writing on fly fishing and the natural world. He joined the Canadian Army as a personnel officer in 1943 and was later seconded for several months to the Royal Canadian Mounted Police which allowed him to travel across Canada and to the Arctic. He was magistrate for the town of Campbell River from 1941 until 1974. He became a trustee of the Nature Conservancy of Canada, an advisor to the BC Wildlife Federation, a senior advisor to Trout Unlimited and the Federation of Flyfishers, and a member of the Federal Fisheries Development Council and the International Pacific Salmon Fisheries Commission. He was also Chancellor of University of Victoria from 1970 to 1973. He served three times on the Federal Electoral Boundaries Commission for British Columbia. These many responsibilities prevented him from devoting much time to writing in the last decade of his life. He retired from the bench a year before his death and was planning to get back to writing as the pressure of his other commitments gradually eased off. His life in his mature years features in many of his books, especially "A River Never Sleeps" and "Measure of the Year".

== Recognition ==
In 1947 Haig-Brown won the inaugural Canadian Library Association Book of the Year for Children Award, recognizing his 1943 novel Starbuck Valley Winter, which features trapping. He won award again in 1963 for The Whale People, a novel that features Native Americans.

In 1953 Haig-Brown received an honorary LLD (Doctor of Laws) from the University of British Columbia. His books for younger readers won several awards, including the Governor General's Award for "Saltwater Summer" (based on his experience salmon fishing off northern Vancouver Island). The Haig-Browns sold their family home and property on the banks of the Campbell River to the BC government to be preserved as greenbelt land in 1974, retaining a lifetime tenancy. The house is now home to a Canada Council sponsored Writer in Residence in the winter months and bed-and-breakfast in the summer. Haig-Brown's literary and judicial papers are in Special Collections in the library of the University of British Columbia and at the University of Victoria. Other family papers are in The Museum at Campbell River.

== Legacy ==
A large-sized Residence Hall at the University of Victoria is named after Roderick Haig-Brown.

Tsútswecw Provincial Park near Kamloops was formerly named Roderick Haig-Brown Provincial Park in recognition of the major work Haig-Brown did to preserve the Fraser River and its tributaries as Pacific salmon habitat, especially spawning grounds. This included lobbying to stop major hydropower projects such as the Moran Dam. The Adams River which runs through the park is home to a major sockeye salmon run.

Mt. Haig-Brown in Strathcona Park on Vancouver Island is named for Roderick and his wife, Ann, in recognition of their efforts to preserve the Park, especially the battle in the 1950s to keep Buttle Lake from being flooded. The battle was lost but the process made many British Columbians aware of the need to be vigilant about their parks and the natural environment.

At the Haig-Brown House, a festival is held every year to commemorate his and his wife's work in conservation and broader community endeavours. During which the Haig-Brown Stewardship Awards are presented, meant to recognize environmental stewardship efforts in the region surrounding Campbell River.

In 2016, Haig-Brown was named a National Historic Person.

== Books ==
- Silver: The Life Story of an Atlantic Salmon (1931)
  - New edition, Vancouver: Douglas & McIntyre, 1989
- Pool and Rapid (1932)
- Ki-yu: A Story of Panthers (1934)
- The Western Angler (1939)
- Return to the River: A story of the Chinook Run (1941)
- Timber (1942)
- Starbuck Valley Winter (1943), illustrated by Charles De Feo
- A River Never Sleeps (1946), illustrated by Stephen Russ
- Saltwater Summer (1948)
- On the Highest Hill (1949)
- Measure of the Year (1950)
- Fisherman's Spring (1951)
- Fisherman's Winter (1954)
- Mounted Police Patrol (1954)
- Captain of the Discovery (1956)
- Fisherman's Summer (1959)
- The Farthest Shores (1960)
- The Living Land: An Account of the Natural Resources of British Columbia (1961)
- Fur and Gold (1962)
- The Whale People (1962), illus. Mary Weiler
- A Primer of Fly-Fishing (1964)
- Fisherman's Fall (1964)
- (with Ralph Wahl), Come Wade the River (1971)
- The Salmon (1974)
- Bright Waters, Bright Fish (1980)
- Alison's Fishing Birds (1980)
- Woods and River Tales (1980)
- The Master and His Fish (1981)
- Writings and Reflections (1982)

== See also ==
- Tsútswecw Provincial Park
- Alan Haig-Brown
