= Rosalinda =

Rosalinda may refer to:

- Rosalinda (given name)
- Rosalinda (album), a 2015 album by Marco Di Meco
- Rosalinda (Mexican TV series), a Mexican telenovela starring Thalía
  - Rosalinda (Philippine TV series), a Philippine remake based on the popular Mexican telenovela
  - "Rosalinda" (song), a 2001 song by Thalía from her album Arrasando
- Rosalinda (film), a 1945 Mexican historical drama film
- Rosalinda, a 1956 American television film aired on NBC's Producers' Showcase
- Rosalinda's Oldfield mouse, a species of rodent in the family Cricetidae

== See also ==
- Rosalind
- Rosalyn
