= Roz =

Roz may refer to:

== People ==
=== Given name ===
Roz /ˈrɒz/, short for Rosalyn, Rosa, Rosalind, and many other forms, is a first name which can refer to:

- Roz Abrams (born 1949), American television journalist
- Roz Chast (born 1954), American cartoonist
- Roz Crowley (born 1987), English rugby union player
- Roz Foyer (born 1972), Scottish trade unionist
- Roz Hammond, Australian comic actress and writer
- Roz Hanby (born 1951), English flight attendant, noted for her British Airways commercials
- Roz Howard (1922–2013), (male) American stock car racing driver
- Roz Joseph (born 1926), American photographer
- Roz Kaveney (born 1949), British writer and editor
- Roz Kelly (born 1943), American actress
- Roz McCall (born 1969), Scottish politician
- Roz Picard (born 1962), American scientist and founder of Affective Computing
- Roz Ryan (born 1951), American actress
- Roz Savage (born 1967), British ocean rower, environmental advocate, writer and speaker
- Roz Weston, (male) Canadian entertainment reporter
- Roz Young (1912–2005), American author, educator, historian, and newspaper columnist

== Fictional characters ==
- Roz, a snail-like monster character in the Monsters, Inc. franchise
- Roz the babysitter, from the film Eyes Wide Shut
- Roz Doyle, a radio producer from the television series Frasier played by Peri Gilpin
- Roz Harmison, love interest of Santiago Munez in the Goal! film series
- Roz Keith, from the film 9 to 5
- Roz Patterson, character in the Australian police drama series Blue Heelers
- Roz Russell, the third female bailiff on the series Night Court played by Marsha Warfield
- Roz, the wild robot character in the film The Wild Robot

== Places ==
- Roz-Landrieux, a commune in the Ille-et-Vilaine department in Brittany in northwestern France
- Roz-sur-Couesnon, a commune in the Ille-et-Vilaine department in Brittany in northwestern France
- Róż, a river of Poland, a tributary of the Narew near Młynarze
