= VPS Convenience =

American convenience store chain

VPS Convenience Store Group
- Company type: Subsidiary
- Industry: Convenience store
- Founded: 1966; 60 years ago in Muncie, Indiana as Village Pantry
- Founder: Don Marsh
- Defunct: June 2015; 11 years ago
- Fate: Acquired by GPM Investments
- Successor: GPM Investments
- Headquarters: Wilmington, North Carolina
- Number of locations: 400 (in 2011)
- Area served: Indiana, Ohio, North Carolina, South Carolina, Tennessee, Virginia
- Products: Grocery, Gasoline
- Brands: Village Pantry, Next Door, Scotchman, Young's, Li'L Cricket
- Owner: Sun Capital Partners
- Website: Archived official website at the Wayback Machine (archive index)

VPS Convenience Store Group was an American convenience store chain headquartered in Wilmington, North Carolina that could trace its roots to the founding of the first Village Pantry convenience store in 1966. VPS was sold in two parts in 2013 and 2015 to GPM Investments.

== History ==
=== Village Pantry ===
Village Pantry was founded as a convenience store chain division of Marsh Supermarkets, founded in Yorktown, Indiana. The first Village Pantry location opened in 1966 in Muncie, Indiana.

In September 2006, Sun Capital Partners purchased Marsh and its divisions, including Village Pantry, $325 million.

In May 2007, Sun announced that they were splitting Village Pantry from Marsh, making it its own company reporting directly to Sun Capital.

In October 2007, Village Pantry acquired Imperial Company, Inc., which operated 33 Next Door Store locations in Michigan and Indiana.

In March 2008, Village Pantry acquired nine AmeriStop Market convenience stores in central Ohio from Petro Acquisitions, Inc., and were rebranded Village Pantry.

In two separate transactions that were completed in March 2008, Sun Capital acquired Li'L Cricket Food Stores Inc., which operated 88 convenience stores in South Carolina under the Li'L Cricket name, and Worsley Operating Companies, which operated 124 convenience stores in North and South Carolina under the Scotchman, Youngs' and S-E names. Worsley also owns its private gas label Carolina Petro, which Sun Capital inherited as well.

=== Formation of VPS Convenience Store Group ===
In Spring 2009, Village Pantry and three other Sun-owned convenience store chains—Young's, Li'l Cricket, and Scotchman—began reorganizing to consolidate accounting and administration with Young's and Scotchman parent company Worsley Operating Corporation. As part of the consolidation, VPS relocated its headquarters from Indianapolis, Indiana, to Wilmington, North Carolina. As of May 2013, the combined operation ran a total of 430 convenience stores as VPS Convenience Store Group.

In January 2011, VPS Convenience Store Group acquired 22 former Appalachian Oil (Appco) c-stores in northeastern Tennessee and southwestern Virginia and were rebranded Scotchman.

GPM Investments (operator of the Fas Mart and Shore Stop convenience stores) acquired the Southeast operations of VPS in August 2013 and the remaining Midwestern division in June 2015.
