= William Haig Brown =

English cleric (1823–1907)

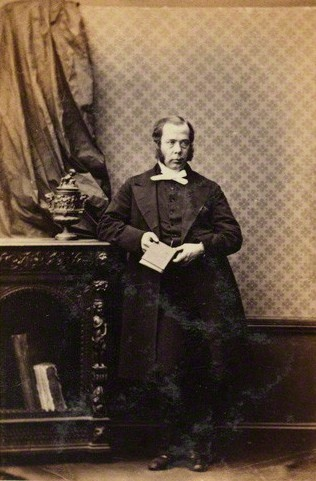
William Haig Brown, 1861 albumen print

William Haig Brown (1823–1907) was an English cleric and reforming headmaster of Charterhouse School.

== Life ==
Born at Bromley by Bow, Middlesex, on 3 December 1823, he was third son of Thomas Brown of Edinburgh and his wife Amelia, daughter of John Haig, of the Haigs of Bemersyde. At age nine he went to Christ's Hospital, where he remained, first in the junior school at Hertford, and later on in London, until 1842.

In 1842 Haig Brown entered Pembroke College, Cambridge, graduating B.A. in 1846 as second in the first class in the classical tripos. Elected a fellow in October 1848 (M.A. 1849), and taking holy orders (deacon 1852 and priest 1853), he was engaged in college work until 1857, when he was appointed headmaster of Kensington School.

In 1863, on the resignation of Dr. Richard Elwyn, the Schoolmaster of Charterhouse School, Haig Brown was appointed his successor on 12 November, against tradition that the schoolmaster should have been educated at the school. In 1864 he proceeded LL.D. at Cambridge. That year the Public Schools' Commission recommended the school's removal from central London, a suggestion opposed by Acton Smee Ayrton. By circulating old Carthusians, Haig Brown gained support for the move, and also won over Lord Derby, an influential Charterhouse governor, and W. E. Gladstone, another.

In May 1866 the Charterhouse governors decided on the removal, and a private act of Parliament, the Charterhouse School Act 1867 (30 & 31 Vict. c. 8 Pr.), was passed in August 1867. The new site at Godalming, the Deanery Farm estate, was found by Haig Brown. The governors bought 55 acres: the first sod was turned on Founder's Day 1869, and on 18 June 1872 the new school was occupied by 117 old and 33 new boys. In accordance with the Public Schools Act 1868, the school had its own governors, and Haig Brown became a conventional headmaster. Among the transferred pupils was Robert Baden-Powell, not academic, but a participant in football and competition shooting. Haig Brown encouraged the future founder of the scouting movement in his explorations of the nearby woods.

Within a few years, in addition to the three houses originally built by the governors, eight others were erected by various masters, until by September 1876 the number of boys had grown to 500, when it was limited. In 1874, the school chapel was consecrated, and additions were then made to the school: class-rooms, a hall, a museum, and new playing-fields. Haig Brown retired in 1897: he had neither sought nor received ecclesiastical preferment.

Haig Brown died at the Master's lodge at the London Charterhouse hospital on 11 January 1907, and was buried in the chapel at Charterhouse School.

== Awards and honours ==
On his retirement from Charterhouse School in 1897 Haig Brown was appointed master of the London Charterhouse. As a memorial of his work at Charterhouse, a seated statue in bronze by Harry Bates, A.R.A. (who died before the work was wholly finished), was set up in front of the school chapel in 1899. His portrait by Frank Holl was placed in the great hall in 1886. He became honorary canon of Winchester in 1891, and honorary fellow of Pembroke, his old college at Cambridge, in 1898. He was also made officier de l'Académie in 1882, and officier de l'Instruction publique in 1900.

Throughout life he maintained a connection with Christ's Hospital, of which he became a "donation governor" in 1864.

== Works ==
Haig Brown's published works included:

- Sertum Carthusianum (1870);
- Charterhouse Past and Present (Godalming, 1879); and
- Carthusian Memories and other Verses of Leisure (with portrait, 1905), a collection of various prologues, epilogues, epigrams, and other fugitive pieces.

He was author, in 1899, of The Christ's Hospital Carmen in Latin and The School Song in English; with versions in Greek, French, and German. Three of his hymns were O God, whose Wisdom made the Sky, God, Thy Mercy's Fountains, and Auctor omnium bonorum.

== Family ==
Haig Brown married, in 1857, Annie Marion, eldest daughter of the Rev. Evan Edward Rowsell, rector of Hambledon, Surrey, the elder brother of Canon Thomas J. Rowsell. They had five sons and seven daughters. Rosalind Mabel Haig Brown who was headmistress of Oxford High School for 30 years, was their daughter. Alan Haig-Brown was their son.

== Notes ==
Attribution

This article incorporates text from a publication now in the public domain: Lee, Sidney, ed. (1912). "Haig Brown, William". Dictionary of National Biography (2nd supplement). Vol. 2. London: Smith, Elder & Co.
