= Rosalind (1879 ship) =

History
- Name: Rosalind
- Owner: CF Jackson & Co, Newcastle
- Builder: Tyne Iron Shipbuilding Co, Willington Quay
- Yard number: 18
- Launched: 21 June 1879
- Christened: 21 June 1879
- Completed: August 1879
- Out of service: 21 May 1918
- Fate: Sunk by mine off the coast of Sweden

General characteristics
- Type: Cargo ship
- Tonnage: 750.28 GRT; 608.84 NRT
- Length: 220 ft 0 in (67.06 m)
- Beam: 30 ft 7 in (9.32 m)
- Depth: 15 ft 0 in (4.57 m)
- Propulsion: Two cylinder compound, 98 hp (73 kW), single propeller
- Sail plan: Schooner
- Speed: 9 kn (17 km/h)
- Crew: 17

SS Rosalind was a cargo ship built by Tyne Iron Shipbuilding of Willington Quay and launched in 1879. She operated as a cargo carrier based at Newcastle upon Tyne. In 1907, she was sold to a Swedish operator named N P Shensson and sailed the Baltic Sea until May 1918 when she was sunk by a mine.

== Design ==
Rosalind was built by Tyne Iron Shipbuilding of Willington Quay on the north bank of the River Tyne, and launched in 1879. She was a steam powered cargo ship with a schooner sailing rig, of 705.28 Gross register tonnage and of 608.84 net register tonnage. Her power plant was a two-cylinder compound engine capable of producing 98 hp (73 kW). The ship was designed to sail on international waters, and is known to have run between Middlesbrough and Bilbao and Copenhagen and Söderhamn. Crew was typically 17, led by a master. Full speed was 9 knots (17 km/h; 10 mph). The ship operated with International Signal Code SPVN.

== Career ==
The vessel was initially operated by C F Jackson and Co until 1884. She was then transferred to A P Harrison & Co. The company subsequently created Rosalind Steamship Co in 1898, and then handed her to Austin Eliot & Co in 1905. In 1907, Rosalind was sold to the Swedish company N P Shensson of Helsingborg, who subsequently sold the ship to Rederi AB Valla (Otto Hillerström) in 1915. The Rosalind Steamship Company was wound up on 9 January 1908 soon after the sale. The ship operated as part of Sweden's mercantile fleet during World War I.

== Loss ==
Rosalind was carrying ballast from Copenhagen to Söderhamn on 21 May 1918 when she struck a mine 35 miles (56 km) southeast of Stockholm and sank.

== See also ==
- Rosalind
