= GPM Investments =

Convenience store owner and operator

GPM Investments LLC (GPM)
- Industry: Convenience store
- Founded: 2003; 23 years ago
- Headquarters: Richmond, Virginia
- Number of locations: 1,400 (2019)
- Area served: Arkansas, Connecticut, Delaware, Florida, Illinois, Indiana, Iowa, Kentucky, Louisiana, Maryland, Michigan, Missouri, Nebraska, New Jersey, North Carolina, Ohio, Oklahoma, Pennsylvania, South Carolina, Tennessee, Texas and Virginia
- Products: Grocery, Gasoline
- Brands: Fas Mart, Shore Stop, Scotchman, BreadBox, Young's, Li'L Cricket, Next Door, Village Pantry, Apple Market, Jiffi Stop, Admiral, Roadrunner Markets, E-Z Mart, Cigarette City & Town Star
- Owner: GPM Investments
- Website: http://www.gpminvestments.com/

GPM Investments LLC (GPM) is a convenience store owner and operator based in Richmond, Virginia. Founded in 2003, it originally operated the Fas Mart and Shore Stop brands of convenience stores, and decided to expand.

== History ==
Its first major purchase was in 2013 with the purchase of the southeast division of convenience stores of VPS Convenience from Sun Capital Partners. This included 263 c-stores in North Carolina, South Carolina, Tennessee and Virginia under the brands Scotchman, Young's, Li’l Cricket, Everyday Shop, Breadbox and Cigarette City.

Also in 2013, GPM purchased five convenience stores from Hurst Harvey Oil under the GET and ZIP brands, all in northern Virginia.

In 2015, GPM purchased the remainder of VPS Convenience with the purchase of VPS Midwest, which included the 161 store chain of Village Pantry and Next Door brands of convenience stores. These are located in Indiana, Ohio, Michigan and Illinois. They also purchased eight One Stop Stores in North and South Carolina Arey Oil, and rebranded them to Scotchman.

Forty-two Road Ranger c-stores were purchased in March 2015 in Illinois, Iowa and Kentucky, bringing the number of convenience stores to about 750. Locations were rebranded to the Fas Mart brand.

2016 was a busy year for acquisitions, with Apple Market's 76 stores were acquired in 2016 in Virginia and Kentucky from Fuel USA. Another 15 c-stores were acquired from Gas-Mart USA, also in 2016. Jiffi Stop was added to the company with its 17 stores in Illinois and Missouri, and the 170 store chain Admiral and Admiral Discount Tobacco stores in November from Admiral Petroleum Company.

The 92 Roadrunner Market stores in Virginia, North Carolina, South Carolina and Tennessee were purchased in 2017 with the acquisition of Mountain Empire Oil Co. Inc., bringing the number of stores to 1,100.

In 2018 GPM acquired 273 stores from E-Z Mart Inc., with this acquisition GPM brings Texas, Louisiana, Oklahoma and Arkansas into its fold and the store count to 1,300+.

On April 2, 2019, GPM announced that, through a subsidiary, they had acquired Port St. Lucie, Florida–based Town Star, adding 18 locations, and entering the Florida market.

On December 8, 2022, GPM officially took over ownership of Pride Convenience Holdings LLC a 31 c-store chain based in Springfield, Massachusetts, from ARKO Corp who previously purchased the chain earlier in the year.

On March 2, 2023, GPM officially took over ownership of Greenville, South Carolina–based Transit Energy Group (TEG) and their affiliates assets. This acquisition comprises approximately 135 convenience stores and is GPM's second acquisition from ARKO Corp. TEG had one of the largest privately held portfolios in the Southeast, with well-known banners including Corner Mart, Dixie Mart, Flash Market, Market Express and Rose Mart.

== Harvest Partners ==
In 2017, a $62.5 million minority investment in GPM was sold to Harvest Partners, a private equity firm, to add liquidity to the company for more acquisitions.
