= Stephen Russ (illustrator) =

British illustrator

Stephen Russ (1919–1983) was a British illustrator, particularly of book dust jackets.

Russ was educated at the Royal College of Art.

He became a lecturer at Bath School of Art and Design, and was the head of printed textiles.

He is probably best known for his cover design for the first Penguin paperback edition of D. H. Lawrence's novel Lady Chatterley's Lover.

He did much of the cover art for the Penguin Poets series in the early 1960s.

== Publications (as author) ==
- Fabric Printing by Hand, 1964, Studio Vista, ISBN 9780289703120
- Practical Screen Printing
- Complete Guide to Print-Making

== Publications (as cover illustrator) ==
- The Face of Spain by Gerald Brenan, 1950, Turnstile Press, London

== Publications (as illustrator) ==
- A river never sleeps by Roderick Haig-Brown, 1948, Collins, London
