= Rosalina =

Rosalina is a feminine given name, and may refer to:

== People ==
- Rosalina Abejo (1922–1991), Filipino composer and conductor
- Rosalina Lydster (born 1962), Vietnamese-American jewelry designer
- Rosalina Mazari (born 1971), Mexican politician
- Rosalina Riseu (born 1972), former Indonesian badminton player
- Rosalina Tuyuc (born 1956), Guatemalan human rights activist

=== Fictional characters ===
- Rosalina (Mario), character in the Mario franchise
- Rosalina, character in The Naked Brothers Band (TV series)

== Music ==
- "Rosalina", song from "The Naked Brothers Band" album The Naked Brothers Band: Music from the Movie
- "Rosalina", song by Vader Abraham 1972

== Other ==
- Rosalina (foraminifera), a genus of protists
- Essential oil of Melaleuca ericifolia

== See also ==
- Rosaline (disambiguation)
