= Marc Leder =

American businessman (born 1962)

Marc J. Leder
- Born: Marc J. Leder; 1962 (age 63–64); Long Island, New York, U.S.
- Education: University of Pennsylvania Wharton School (BS)
- Occupation: Businessman
- Title: Co-founder; Sun Capital Partners; Limited partner; Harris Blitzer Sports & Entertainment
- Spouse: Lisa J. Weisbein (m. 1987; div. 2010)
- Children: 4
- Website: www.marcleder.com

Marc J. Leder (born in 1962) is an American businessman who co-founded Sun Capital Partners, a private equity firm based in Boca Raton, Florida. He is also a limited partner of Harris Blitzer Sports & Entertainment, which owns the NBA's Philadelphia 76ers and the NHL's New Jersey Devils, and the Josh Harris Group, which owns Real Salt Lake of the MLS, the English Premier League's Crystal Palace F.C., and the NFL's Washington Commanders.

== Early life and education ==
Leder was born to a Jewish family and raised in the Long Island suburbs of New York City. In 1979, Leder graduated from John L. Miller Great Neck North High School and in 1983, earned a Bachelor of Science degree in economics from the Wharton School of the University of Pennsylvania, where he befriended his future business partner, Rodger Krouse.

== Career ==
After graduating, Leder joined Lehman Brothers in January 1987 as an analyst, and worked his way up to Senior Vice President. In 1995, he left Lehman's with Krouse to found the private equity firm Sun Capital Partners, Inc.

=== Sun Capital Partners ===
Leder and Krouse founded Sun Capital in 1995. They chose Boca Raton, Florida for their headquarters, believing the New York market was already too saturated and competitive.

Leder describes the difficult first five years for Sun Capital, saying he and Krouse were, "just two investment bankers trying to get into private equity." And, when he asked his private equity contacts for advice, they told him, "stick with investment banking." Undeterred, Leder says they honed a careful strategy, which was "to buy companies that others didn't want to buy." Through perseverance, their strategy proved successful, leading to nearly a decade of rapid growth until 2008, when the market downturn and global Great Recession took hold. That forced Leder and Krouse to retrench, and to once again rework their strategy, and by July 2013, Sun Capital had $8 billion in invested assets.

Leder credits the lessons learned from the global recession for helping him guide Sun Capital's path through the COVID-19 pandemic a decade later. He told RSM US, "We had the playbook for this pandemic—not the social distancing, but the dramatic economic impact, the deep recession we find ourselves in. And we shared that playbook with our management teams, and they were outstanding at getting and understanding the challenges that were facing them, whether it be employee safety and health, to cutting costs, to maintaining liquidity, to serving customers."

As of January 2024, Sun Capital reports $14 billion in cumulative capital commitments from a portfolio of around 40 companies that employ nearly 28,000 people worldwide.

=== The Sun Capital Partners Foundation ===
In 2007, Leder and Krouse created the charitable arm of the company called the Sun Capital Partners Foundation. The foundation pools and triple-matches employee contributions. The foundation says its goal is to "promote sustainable, positive change" by working with local nonprofit organizations. Since its inception, the Sun Capital Foundation reports over $17 million in donations to over 700 charities.

=== Criticism ===
In 2012, The New York Times wrote that to his critics Leder represented everything that's wrong with the private equity business, noting that: "In recent years, a large number of the companies that Sun Capital has acquired have run into serious trouble, eliminated jobs or both. Since 2008, some 25 of its companies — roughly one of every five it owns — have filed for bankruptcy. Among the losers was Friendly's, the restaurant chain ... (Sun Capital was accused by a federal agency of pushing Friendly’s into bankruptcy ... to avoid paying pensions to the chain’s employees; Sun disputes that contention.) Another company that sank into bankruptcy was Real Mex, owner of the Chevy’s restaurant chain. In that case, Mr. Leder lost money for his investors not once, but twice."

== Investments in Professional Sports Franchises ==
Leder is a member of an investment group led by Josh Harris that purchased the NBA's Philadelphia 76ers for $280 million in 2011. Leder is also a limited partner of another Harris-led group that purchased the New Jersey Devils of the NHL and the Newark, New Jersey Prudential Center arena for $320 million in 2013. Then, in 2015, Leder again joined Harris in buying a controlling stake in Crystal Palace F.C. of the English Premier League. In 2022, Leder was part of a group led by Harris's longtime business partner, David Blitzer that purchased Real Salt Lake, which competes in Major League Soccer's Western Conference (MLS). Finally, in 2023, Leder again partnered with Harris to purchase the NFL's Washington Commanders for $6.05 billion, the highest price ever paid for a North American sports franchise.

== Personal life ==
Leder has three children with his ex-wife Lisa J. Weisbein. They were married from 1987 until divorcing in 2010. In January 2012, Leder had another daughter with his girlfriend at the time. He told the New York Post that he agreed to a "generous and amicable agreement over child support.

== Politics ==
Dating back to his early contacts with private equity firm Bain Capital, Leder has been a personal and financial supporter of the United States Senator from Utah, Mitt Romney, including during the Mitt Romney 2012 presidential campaign in which he became the Republican Presidential Nominee. During the 2012 election cycle, Reuters reports that "out of the $337,000 Leder has spent in political donations in this election season, $321,600 has gone to Mitt Romney and other Republicans and Republican-aligned groups."

However, Leder is also known to make donations to certain progressive groups and leaders, including liberal activist and recording artist Russell Simmons to support his nonprofit work in the arts.
