= HMS Rosalind =

There have been two ships of the Royal Navy named HMS Rosalind, named after the protagonist in William Shakespeare's As You Like It:

- HMS Rosalind (1913), renamed Liberty shortly after launching in 1913, an L-class destroyer that fought at the Battle of Jutland in 1916 and was broken up in 1921.
- HMS Rosalind (1916), an R-class destroyer launched by Thornycroft in 1916 and scrapped in 1926.

== See also ==
- The Modified Rosalinds were five S-class destroyers built by Thornycroft based on the 1916 ship.
- HMT Rosalind was a Shakespearian-class naval trawler launched in 1941 and transferred to Kenya 1946.
- Rosalind (ship), other ships named Rosalind
