= Ann Cvetkovich =

American academic (born 1957)

Ann Luja Cvetkovich (born 1957) is a professor of women's and gender studies at the University of Texas at Austin and professor emeritus in the Feminist Institute of Social Transformation at Carleton University. Until 2019, she was the Ellen Clayton Garwood Centennial Professor of English at the University of Texas at Austin, where she was the founding director of the LGBTQ Studies program in 2017. She has published three books: Mixed Feelings: Feminism, Mass Culture, and Victorian Sensationalism (1992); An Archive of Feelings: Trauma, Sexuality, and Lesbian Public Cultures (2003); and Depression: A Public Feeling (2012).

She co-edited Articulating the Global and Local: Globalization and Cultural Studies (1996) with Douglas Kellner, as well as Political Emotions: New Agendas in Communication (2010) with Janet Staiger and Ann Reynolds. Cvetkovich also co-edited a special issue of Scholar and Feminist Online, entitled "Public Sentiments", with Ann Pellegrini. She is also a former co-editor of GLQ with Annamarie Jagose.

A number of well-known scholars have drawn on Cvetkovich's work, including Jack Halberstam, Heather Love, Sara Ahmed, Jonathan Alexander, and Deborah Gould.

In her scholarship, Cvetkovich engages with feminist and queer theory, affect and feeling, archival theory, oral history, and the everyday effects of trauma. Her interdisciplinary work includes documentary film, memoir, music and dance performance, literature, and visual arts.

== Early life and education ==
Ann Cvetkovich was born to Joseph J. Cvetkovich and Valerie Haig-Brown. She was raised in Vancouver and Toronto. She moved to the United States in 1976 in order to attend Reed College, receiving her Bachelor of Arts in literature and philosophy in 1980. She then attended Cornell University, completing a Master of Arts in 1985 and a PhD in English literature in 1988.

== Scholarship ==
Cvetkovich's early work is historical, dealing with Victorian literature and mass culture, most of her work engages with more contemporary cultural texts and political issues. All of her work is shaped by her interest in feeling as both a subject and framework. In her article, "Histories of Mass Culture: From Literary to Visual Culture" (1999), Cvetkovich discusses the interconnectedness between her interests in the Victorian and the contemporary, as well as the literary and the visual:

As someone who has a first book in Victorian studies and a second on the way that primarily considers contemporary U.S. gay and lesbian culture, I worry about being perceived as having changed fields—crossing the boundaries of genre, period, and nation that define our specializations—rather than as someone who is pursuing the same questions in a range of contexts. But I would argue that my study of the politics of sensationalism, in one case, and my study of the politics of trauma, in the other, are linked by questions about the history of discourses of affect.

As opposed to some other scholars in cultural studies, Cvetkovich does not emphasize the differences between affect, feeling, and emotion. Rather she uses both affect and feeling "in a generic sense," where affect is "a category that encompasses affect, emotion, and feeling, and that includes impulses, desires, and feelings that get historically constructed in a range of ways." She favours the term feeling because it retains "the ambiguity between feelings as embodied sensations and feelings as psychic or cognitive experiences."

Cvetkovich's work is associated with the queer feminist project Public Feelings, which was begun in 2001. The Public Feelings project is interested in the relationship between the public and political as well as the private and affective, emphasizing the significance of everyday life and affective experience. One of the cells of the project is Feel Tank Chicago, which came up with the idea of "political depression," a concept Cvetkovich works with in her book Depression: A Public Feeling (2012).

Amongst other topics, Cvetkovich has analyzed AIDS films; butch and femme sexualities; sexuality and activism in go-go dancing; Alison Bechdel's graphic memoir Fun Home: A Family Tragicomic; and oral interviews with Afghan Americans in relation to the September 11 attacks. She has interviewed artists and photographers including Allyson Mitchell, Sheila Pepe, Tammy Rae Carland, and Zoe Leonard, as well as engaging with their works in her scholarship.

== Major works ==
=== Mixed Feelings: Feminism, Mass Culture, and Victorian Sensationalism (1992) ===
Mixed Feelings is based on Cvetkovich's PhD dissertation, which she completed at Cornell University in 1988. It grew out of Cvetkovich's "own mixed feelings about a feminist politics of affect," and argues that the effects of affect are not always liberating; rather, affect can "call attention to and obscure complex social relations, and can both inspire and displace social action." In looking at the figure of "the transgressive and/or suffering woman...Cvetkovich traces the construction of affect as both natural and particularly female, and as therefore potentially transgressive and requiring regulation and control." While Cvetkovich interrogates the way Marxist, feminist, Foucauldian, and psychoanalytic theories have engaged with affect, she also draws upon these approaches in her study. Cvetkovich argumes that affect should not be viewed as natural but instead as historical.

In Mixed Feelings, Cvetkovich primarily explores the politics of affect in relation to Victorian sensationalism in the 1860s and 1870s. While she focuses mostly on traditional Victorian sensation novels such as Mary Elizabeth Braddon's Lady Audley's Secret, Wilkie Collins's The Woman in White, and Ellen Wood's East Lynne, she also looks at works that are not typically read as Victorian sensationalism. One chapter looks at George Eliot's Daniel Deronda, where she reads Gwendolen's "dramatic interiority" in relation to the affective power of sensation novels. Another reads Karl Marx's Capital as a sensationalist narrative which sensationalizes the male worker's body rather than the figure of the middle-class woman. Although Mixed Feelings focuses primarily on Victorian sensationalism, the book also contains discussions of HIV/AIDS activism and the politics of affect in relation to ACT UP.

=== An Archive of Feelings: Trauma, Sexuality, and Lesbian Public Cultures (2003) ===
In An Archive of Feelings, Cvetkovich argues for a wider view of trauma with an interest "not just in trauma survivors but in those whose experiences circulate in the vicinity of trauma and are marked by it. I want to place moments of extreme trauma alongside moments of everyday emotional distress that are often the only sign that trauma's effects are still being felt." Cvetkovich also critiques the pathologization of trauma and argues for a broader understanding of therapy. She breaks the binary "often animated in trauma studies scholarship between acting out (frequently pathologized or designated unhealthy) and working through (often viewed as psychologically positive)." Cvetkovich suggests that the public cultures formed around trauma can have therapeutic effects. Collapsing the boundary between privatized emotion and the public and political, "affective life can be seen to pervade public life."

The book is "an exploration of cultural texts as repositories of feelings and emotions, which are encoded not only in the content of the texts themselves but in the practices that surround their production and reception." According to Cvetkovich, archives of trauma resemble the archives of gay and lesbian cultures. Ephemerality and memory fundamental to both, and both also challenge the concept of the archive. Cvetkovich's sources include oral interviews, performances, fiction, poetry, memoirs, photographs, and films. Theoretically, she engages with feminist, critical race, Marxist, and queer theory.

An Archive of Feelings focuses specifically on lesbian and queer trauma. Cvetkovich explores works on butch and femme sexualities in relation to trauma and touch, as well as the complex relationship between incest, lesbianism, and queerness. She analyzes performances by Tribe 8 at the Michigan Womyn's Music Festival and works by Margaret Randall and Dorothy Allison. Another section of Cvetkovich's book discusses trauma and queer diaspora in Frances Negrón-Muntaner's film Brincando el charco, Pratibha Parmar's film Khush, and Shani Mootoo's novel Cereus Blooms at Night. An Archive of Feelings also discusses AIDS activism, particularly in relation to the organization ACT UP. Drawing upon oral interviews with lesbians who participated in ACT UP, as well as memoirs about caretaking during the AIDS crisis, Cvetkovich seeks to place lesbians back into the history of ACT UP during a time when the organization was "in danger of being remembered as a group of privileged gay white men without a strong political sensibility."

=== Depression: A Public Feeling (2012) ===
In Depression: A Public Feeling, Cvetkovich looks at "depression as a cultural and social phenomenon rather than a medical disease." She interrogates the biological model of depression and suggests the significance of both cultural criticism and individual experience as alternative knowledges of depression. Situating her work in relation to the Public Feelings project, she links the private world of feelings to the public world of politics, associating depression with neoliberal capitalism. While Cvetkovich explores how feelings of depression "are produced by social forces," she also emphasizes the everyday affective aspects of depression. Her work is influenced by Eve Sedgwick's argument for a reparative critical approach. Divided into two sections, the book is part memoir and part critical essay; the goal is to produce "a cultural analysis that can adequately represent depression as a historical category, a felt experience, and a point of entry into discussions not only about theory and contemporary culture but about how to live."

The memoir section of the book, "The Depression Journals," focuses on the feelings of anxiety and despair surrounding important events in her academic career – finishing her dissertation, getting an academic job, and signing a contract for her first book – as well as how these feelings affected her everyday life. Although she notes her experiences with medication and therapists, she focuses more on ordinary things that helped her overcome her depression.

The critical section of the book provides analysis into some of the topics brought up in "The Depression Journals," including spirituality and religion. For Cvetkovich, acedia, understood to be an historical precursor to depression, can help provide an alternative to the medical model. Cvetkovich's critical essay also explores the relationship between depression and histories of racism and colonialism. Looking at the artistic work of Sheila Pepe and Allyson Mitchell, she views "crafting as a model for creative ways of living in a depressive culture."

== Reception and influence ==
Depression: A Public Feeling was reviewed by Elaine Showalter in The Chronicle of Higher Education as part of her piece "Our Age of Anxiety". Showalter is critical of her emphasis on depression in higher education, asking, "[H]ow does focusing on academic anxiety bring light to the discussion in general?" Depression: A Public Feeling was a finalist for the 25th Lambda Literary Awards. The book was interpreted and performed by Dynasty Handbag as part of the "Otherwise: Queer Scholarship into Song" event. Tammy Rae Carland's 2008 photographic project entitled An Archive of Feelings takes its name from Cvetkovich's book by the same name.

An Archive of Feelings is perhaps Cvetkovich's most influential work, and has been taken up in several academic fields, including sexuality studies, queer theory, American studies, and gender studies. In Feeling Backward: Loss and the Politics of Queer History (2007), Heather Love describes being influenced by how An Archive of Feelings "makes backward feelings central." Mel Y. Chen also draws from "the affective politics of Ann Cvetkovich's important work on lesbian cultures of trauma" in their work on animacies. Jack Halberstam has been influenced by "Cvetkovich's concept of archive of feelings, a term central for Halberstam."

In Eve Sedgwick and Adam Frank's article "Shame in the Cybernetic Fold: Reading Silvan Tomkins", they critique Cvetkovich's engagement with affect in Mixed Feelings:

Perhaps most oddly for a 'theory of affect,' this one has no feelings in it. Affect is treated as a unitary category, with a unitary history and unitary politics. There is no theoretical room for any difference between being, say, amused, being disgusted, being ashamed, and being enraged. [...] Cvetkovich's implication throughout is that genres are differentiated not in relation to the kinds of affect they may evoke or generate but far more simply by the presence or absence of some reified substance called Affect.

== Selected publications ==
- "Photographing Objects as Queer Archival Practice". In Brown, Elspeth H.; Phu, Thy (eds.). Feeling Photography. Duke University Press. 2014. pp. 273–296.
- "The Craft of Conversation: Oral History and Lesbian Feminist Art Practice". In Sandino, Linda; Partington, Matthew (eds.). Oral History in the Visual Arts. Bloomsbury. 2013. pp. 125–34.
- Depression: A Public Feeling. Durham: Duke University Press. 2012.
- "Depression is ordinary: Public feelings and Saidiya Hartman's Lose Your Mother". Feminist Theory. 13 (2): 131–146. 2012.
- "Can the Diaspora Speak?: Afghan Americans and the 9/11 Oral History Archive". Radical History Review (111): 90–100. 2011-09-01.
- "Photographing Objects: Art as Queer Archival Practice". In Danbolt, Mathias; Rowley, Jane; Wolthers, Louise (eds.). Lost and Found: Queerying the Archive. Copenhagen: Nikolaj Copenhagen Contemporary Art Center. 2009. pp. 49–65.
- "Drawing the Archive in Alison Bechdel's Fun Home". Women's Studies Quarterly. 36 (1–2): 111–28. 2008.
- "Public Feelings". The South Atlantic Quarterly. 106 (3): pp. 459–68. 2007.
- An Archive of Feelings: Trauma, Sexuality, and Lesbian Public Cultures. Durham: Duke University Press. 2003
- "In the Archives of Lesbian Feeling: Documentary and Popular Culture". Camera Obscura. 17 (1): pp. 107–47. 2002.
- "White Boots and Combat Boots: My Life as a Lesbian Go-Go Dancer". In Desmond, Jane C. (ed.). Dancing Desires: Choreographing Sexualities On & Off the Stage. Madison: University of Wisconsin Press. 2001. pp. 315–48.
- "Histories of Mass Culture: From Literary to Visual Culture". Victorian Literature and Culture 27 (2): pp. 495–99. 1999.
- "Untouchability and Vulnerability: Stone Butchness as Emotional Style". In Munt, Sally R. (ed.). Butch/Femme: Inside Lesbian Gender. London: Cassell. 1998. pp. 159–69.
- "Video, AIDS, and Activism". In Kester, Grant H. (ed.). Art, Activism, and Oppositionality: Essays from Afterimage. Durham: Duke University Press. 1998. pp. 182–98.
- "Sexual Trauma/Queer Memory: Incest, Lesbianism, and Therapeutic Culture". GLQ 2 (4): pp. 351–77. 1995.
- "The Powers of Seeing and Being Seen: Truth or Dare and Paris is Burning". In Collins, Jim (ed.). Film Theory Goes to the Movies. New York: Routledge. 1993. pp. 155–69.
- Mixed Feelings: Feminism, Mass Culture, and Victorian Sensationalism. New Jersey: Rutgers University Press. 1992.
- "Postmodern Vertigo: The Sexual Politics of Allusion in De Palma's Body Double". In Raubicheck, Walter; Srebnick, Walter (eds.). Hitchcock's Rereleased Films: From Rope to Vertigo. Detroit: Wayne State University Press. 1991. pp. 147–62.
- "Ghostlier Determinations: The Economy of Sensation and 'The Woman in White'". Novel: A Forum on Fiction 23 (1): pp. 24–43. 1989.

== Roundtables and interviews ==
- Carland, Tammy Rae; Cvetkovich, Ann (2013-10-24). "Sharing an Archive of Feelings: A Conversation". Art Journal. 72 (2): pp. 70–77.
- "Roundtable: Gender and September 11". Signs 28 (1): pp. 433–79. 2002.
- Lurie, Susan; Cvetkovich, Ann; Gallop, Jane; Modleski, Tania; Spillers, Hortense; Kaplan, Carla (2001). "Roundtable: Restoring Feminist Politics to Poststructuralist Critique". Feminist Studies. 27 (3): 679–707.
- Cvetkovich, Ann; Wahng, Selena (2001). "Don't Stop the Music: Roundtable Discussion with Workers from the Michigan Womyn's Music Festival". GLQ: A Journal of Lesbian and Gay Studies. 7 (1): 131–151.
