= Alan Haig-Brown (footballer) =

British Army officer and author (1877–1918)

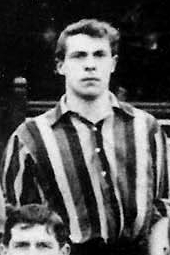
- Haig-Brown while with Old Carthusians in 1903

Personal information
- Full name: Alan Roderick Haig-Brown
- Date of birth: 6 September 1877
- Place of birth: Godalming, England
- Date of death: 25 March 1918 (aged 40)
- Place of death: near Bapaume, France
- Position: Outside right

Youth career
- 1895–1896: Charterhouse School
- 1896–1899: Cambridge University

Senior career*
Years	Team	Apps	(Gls)
–1900	Godalming		
- Old Carthusians
–1901	Corinthian		
1901–1903	Tottenham Hotspur	4	
1903	Old Carthusians		
1903	Clapton Orient		
1903–1906	Brighton & Hove Albion		
- Worthing
- Shoreham
1906	Clapton Orient	4	(1)
- * Club domestic league appearances and goals

Alan Roderick Haig-Brown DSO (6 September 1877 – 25 March 1918) was a British Army officer and author who served as commander of the Lancing Officers' Training Corps and later fought in the First World War. He was also an amateur football outside right and played in the Football League for Clapton Orient.

== Early life ==
Haig-Brown was the son of William Haig Brown, headmaster of Charterhouse School, where he was born on 6 September 1877. His elder sister was the headteacher Rosalind Brown. After attending the Dragon School and Charterhouse School, Haig-Brown matriculated at Pembroke College, Cambridge in 1896 and graduated with a B.A. in Classical Tripos in 1899. He was awarded a blue in 1898 and 1899. In 1899, Haig-Brown was appointed Assistant Master at Lancing College.

== Army career ==
Haig-Brown's army career began at Lancing College in 1906, as a lieutenant in the Lancing Officers' Training Corps and by the end of the year, he had been promoted to captain. In 1908, his commission was transferred to the Territorial Army. Haig-Brown commanded the Lancing Officers' Training Corps until 1915, by which time the British Army was fighting in the First World War. On 1 January 1916, he was transferred to the 23rd Battalion of the Middlesex Regiment on 1 January 1916, promoted to major and appointed second-in-command of the battalion. Haig-Brown was appointed a temporary lieutenant colonel in September 1916 and given command of the battalion.

Haig-Brown saw active service on the Western and Italian fronts between 1916 and 1918, was mentioned in dispatches twice and awarded the Distinguished Service Order. He was killed by machine-gun fire whilst conducting a rear guard action on the Bapaume-Sapignies road, France on 25 March 1918, the first day of the German spring offensive. Haig-Brown was buried Achiet-le-Grand Communal Cemetery Extension.

== Author ==
Haig-Brown authored three books, Sporting Sonnets: And Other Verses (1903), My Game Book (1913) and The O. T. C. and the Great War (1915).

== Personal life ==
Haig-Brown had a wife, a son (Roderick Haig-Brown) and two daughters.

== Career statistics ==
Appearances and goals by club, season and competition
Club	Season	League			FA Cup		Total	
Club	Season	Division	Apps	Goals	Apps	Goals	Apps	Goals
Tottenham Hotspur	1901–02	Southern League First Division	2	0	0	0	0	2
Tottenham Hotspur	1902–03	Southern League First Division	2	0	0	0	0	2
Career total			4	0	0	0	0	4
