= The Cave (2009 film) =

2009 Canadian short science fiction film

- Chilcotin: ?E?anx
- Directed by: Helen Haig-Brown
- Written by: Helen Haig-Brown
- Produced by: Leena Minifie; Adrian Cox; Natalia Tudge
- Starring: Edmund Lulua; Kelly William
- Cinematography: Randy Che
- Edited by: Alec MacNeill Richardson
- Production company: Rugged Media
- Release date: October 14, 2009 (imagineNATIVE)
- Running time: 12 minutes
- Country: Canada
- Language: Tsilhqot'in

The Cave (Tsilhqot'in: ?E?anx) is a Canadian short science fiction film, directed by Helen Haig-Brown and released in 2009. The first science fiction film shot in an Indigenous Canadian language, the film adapts a Tsilhqot'in tale about a man who discovers a portal to the spirit world while hunting a bear.

The film stars Edmund Lulua as the hunter, and Kelly William as his spirit world guide. Narration is provided by the original tape recording of the story, which was first recorded by Haig-Brown's great uncle.

The film was produced as part of the Embargo Collective, a project spearheaded by the ImagineNATIVE Film and Media Arts Festival to commission the creation of short films in indigenous languages. It was shot in summer 2009 in the Nemaiah Valley near Williams Lake, British Columbia, and premiered at ImagineNATIVE in October 2009.

The film was named to the Toronto International Film Festival's annual year-end Canada's Top Ten list for 2009.
