= Roselyn Bakery =

Bakeries of the United States

Roselyn Bakery was a major bakery chain that distributed products from an Indianapolis central baking facility from 1943 to 1999. The bakery chain, which consisted of approximately 40 retail store locations in and around central Indiana, was known for its popular treats such as their Sweetheart Coffee Cake, Zebra Square Brownies and Blackout Cake.

== History ==
Roselyn Bakery was started in 1943 by John S. Clark Jr. and his wife Mildred on North Meridian Street.

In July 1999, the factory was abruptly shutdown by the Indiana State Department of Health for repeated/severe code violations. The entire chain was dissolved soon after.

== Roselyn Recipe ==
Despite the closure being heavily publicized by the local media, the popularity of Roselyn Bakery's products did not wane.

In May 2000, the Clark family formed a new company called Roselyn Recipe and hired Heinemann's Bakeries, a commercial bakery in Chicago, to produce a limited number of bakery products for distribution at local supermarkets. Heinemann's closed in August 2005.

A few months later, Roselyn Recipe published a cookbook that was initially sold in supermarkets that carry Roselyn's bakery products. (Reprints of the cookbook have since been made available at Roselyn Recipe, the bakery's official website.)

In April 2005, the Dias family, along with another partner, purchased Roselyn Recipe and the intellectual property assets of Roselyn Bakery from the Clark family, the bakery's original founders. Two bakeries were contracted, one in St. Louis and the other in Indianapolis, to continue the production and distribution of these products.

Roselyn Recipe treats can be found and purchased in Kroger stores in central Indiana and several states; and all Marsh Supermarkets in Central Indiana and Western Ohio (until Marsh's liquidation in 2017).
