= Valerie Haig-Brown =

Canadian activist, athlete, author and conservationist

- Born: Valerie Joan Haig-Brown; 1936 (age 89–90); Campbell River, British Columbia, Canada
- Education: University of British Columbia
- Occupations: Activist, athlete, author, conservationist, editor
- Notable work: Deep Currents: Roderick and Ann Haig-Brown
- Spouse(s): Joseph J. Cvetkovich (first); Mr. McGregor (second); H. John Russell (m. 1983)
- Children: 1
- Parent(s): Roderick Haig-Brown; Ann Elmore

Valerie Joan Haig-Brown (born 1936 in Campbell River, British Columbia) is a Canadian activist, athlete, author, and conservationist.

== Biography ==
Haig-Brown was born in 1936 to Roderick Haig-Brown and Ann (Elmore). In high school, Haig-Brown was a champion Track and Field athlete for Campbell River High School on Vancouver Island. She was also the president of the Drama Club and a writer for the school annual. During her last year at Campbell River High School and her first year at the University of British Columbia, she was also a member of the Vancouver Olympic Club.

In 1953, she was one of three women members of the Vancouver Olympic Club. From 1953 to 1957, Haig-Brown attended the University of British Columbia. In the mid 1950s, while still attending UBC, Haig-Brown married Joseph J. Cvetkovich. With Joseph, she had a daughter named Ann Luja Cvetkovich in July 1957. Ann has a doctorate in English Language and Literature, and, as of 2020, is the Director of the Pauline Jewett Institute of Women's and Gender Studies at Carleton University.

In the late 1960s and early 1970s, Haig-Brown was married to a Mr McGregor. While editing a book by her father, that was to be published posthumously in the early 1980s, Haig-Brown visited and spoke with writer Andy Russell in Waterton Park, Alberta. She met his son H. John Russell during her brief time there. She went on to marry John in 1983 and joined him in his conservation battles, particularly in his fight against the Oldman River Dam. Haig-Brown climbed Vancouver Island's Mount Haig-Brown, named for her father, when she was 70.

== Time at university ==
Haig-Brown attended the University of British Columbia from 1953 to 1957. During her first year, in 1954, she ran in the Alma Mater Society election for 2nd member at large, which she lost. Also in 1954, she joined Kappa Kappa Gamma. Beginning in January 1955, she was a writer and editor The Ubyssey. This time as an editor and reporter ended in late 1956. She was also an editor of the Chronicle, published by the UBC Alumni Association, and held membership in the Women's Residence Council and Women's Administration Board.

== Athletic career ==
- 31 May 1952, Won second class championship honors for Vancouver Island .
- August 1952, Junior Track Event. 1st Jr. Girls' Broad Jump (15' 7.75"), 2nd Jr. Girls high jump.
- August 23, 1952 BC Junior Track and Field Championships: Winner of the Junior Girls Aggregate title with 13 points. Won the Jr. Girls 75 yard with a time of 8.9 seconds.
- 1 March 1953, Entered the 100-yard dash in the Vancouver Relay event .
- 29 and 30 May 1953, Seventh Annual British Columbia Inter-High School Track and Field Meet - Friday Qualifying: Victories in 100 and 60-yard (7.3 seconds) sprints. Her 60-yard sprint time was one-tenth of a second off from the existing record. - Saturday Events: Lost Girl's Championship by one point. Came second in 60 yards and Broad Jump.
- 20 June 1953 Vancouver Island Meet: Came second in Women's Broad Jump and 3rd in Women's open 220 yards.
- 29 July 1953 Canadian pentathlon championship and Vancouver Olympic Club's 3rd Annual Invitational: Ran in the 100 metre race.
- 1 August 1953 Caledonian Society's Caledonian Games. Participating in this track meet gave Haig-Brown a chance to be one of 10 BC students selected to participate in the Canadian National Exhibition championships in Toronto. Before the meet, she was one of 17 athletes thought to be in the running for a selection. She ended up finishing 2nd in Girls Broad Jump (16 feet 3.75 inches) and 3rd in the 100 yards Senior Women spring.
- Haig-Brown was awarded a special prize for her work in the Vancouver Olympic Club's 1953 season.
- In 1954, Vancouver Olympic Club president Alex Frew named Haig-Brown as one of the potential athletes that the club was considering entering in the 1954 British Empire and Commonwealth Games in Vancouver.

== Professional career ==
She was an editor with Maclean's and The Canadian magazines. In 1969, Haig-Brown, as Valerie McGregor, became the editor of a new free magazine called the "Toronto Calendar," which was distributed to wealthy households in Toronto.

In 1978, while working for TVOntario as manager of information services, Haig-Brown was asked by publisher Jack McClelland to edit her father's writings. She ended up discovering enough material for three books after perusing her father's material. Shortly after discovering the amount of work to be done was worth a trilogy of books, she quit TVOntario and devoted herself to the project.

== Writing career ==
- Short hikes and strolls in Waterton Lakes National Park 1987
- Deep currents : Roderick and Ann Haig-Brown 1997

== Editing ==
- To Know a River : A Haig-Brown Reader by Roderick Haig-Brown 1981
- Woods and river tales : from the world of Roderick Haig-Brown 1981 by Roderick Haig-Brown.
- The master and his fish : from the world of Roderick Haig-Brown by Roderick Haig-Brown 1981
- Writings and Reflections : From the World of Roderick Haig-Brown by Roderick Haig-Brown 1982.
- Excerpts from the diaries of Roderick Haig-Brown, 1927-1929 & 1932-1933 1992
- Voices in the wind : a Waterton-Glacier anthology 2000
