= Rosalyn Nandwa =

Deputy Chief of Staff to Kenyan vice president

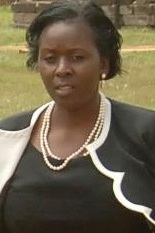
- Nandwa in 2014

Deputy Chief of Staff to the Deputy President of Kenya
- Incumbent
- Assumed office April 2014
- Deputy President: William Ruto
- Preceded by: Linnet Hamasi

Personal details
- Born: 22 June 1968 (age 57)
- Spouse: Harrison Nandwa
- Children: 4
- Education: Nairobi University; University of Alabama School of Law

Rosalyn Waseka Nandwa (born 22 June 1968) is a Kenyan politician who is the current deputy chief of staff to the deputy president of Kenya William Ruto and chief of staff to the second lady Rachel Ruto.

== Early life ==
Rosalyn Waseka was born on 22 June 1968. She graduated from Nairobi University with a Bachelor of Laws degree. Following a successful stint in corporate law, she proceeded to start her own practice, Deche, Nandwa, Bryant. Following several years in private practice, she obtained an LLM in International Law from the University of Alabama Law School. She also has a doctorate in counselling and Ministry.

== Ruto's Administration ==
She joined the Ruto administration in April 2014 as the Deputy Chief of Staff for Deputy President William Ruto, succeeding Linnet Hamasi in this position.

== Personal life ==
Nandwa is married to Harrison Nandwa, with whom she has four children, Eugene, Nicole, Natalie, and Ethan.
