= Rosaline lace =

Two types of floral lace

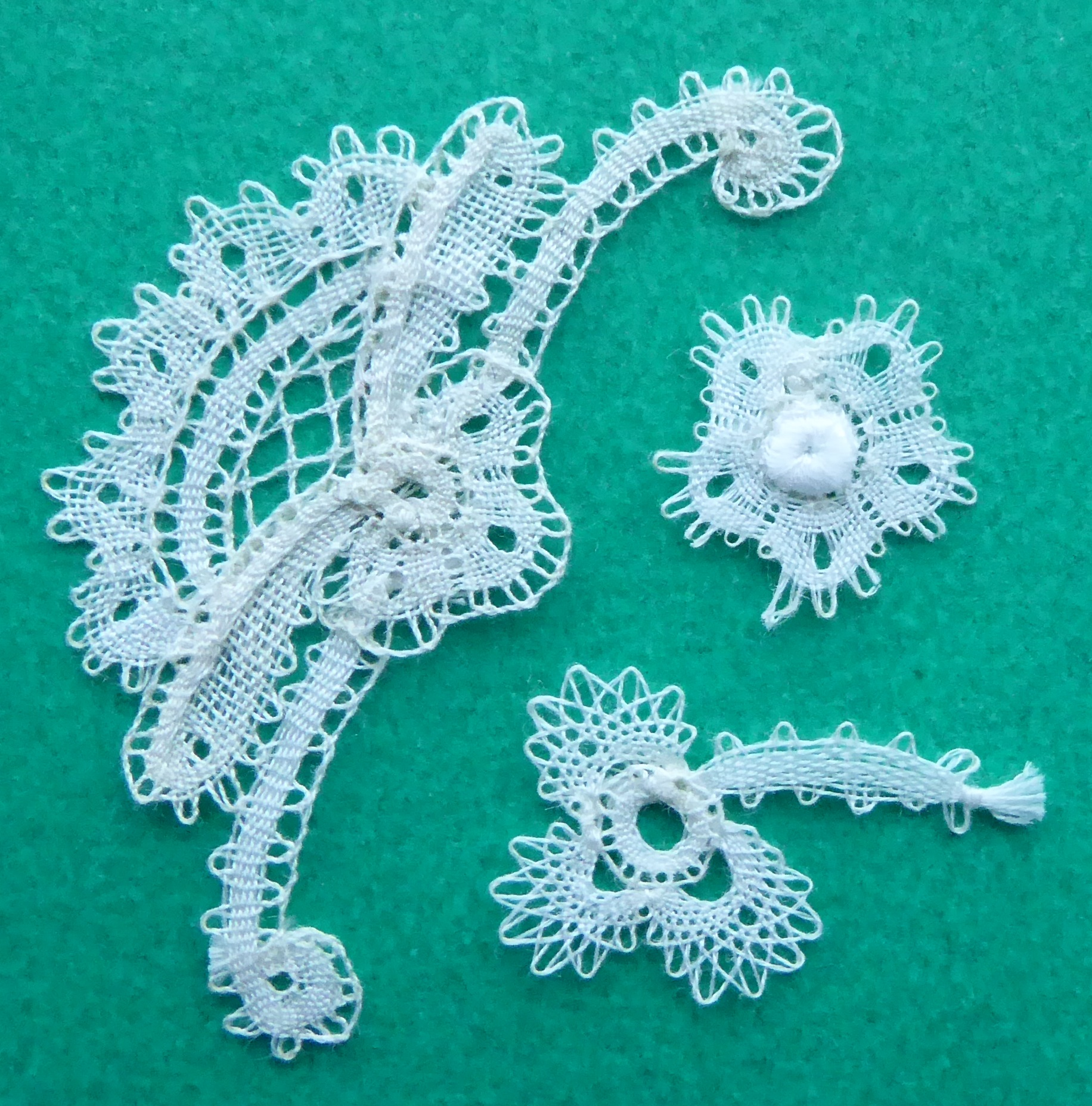
- Rosaline Perlée typical small motifs
- Type: Lace
- Material: linen
- Production method: Bobbin lace
- Production process: Craft production
- Place of origin: Aalast region, Belgium
- Introduced: 19th century

Rosaline lace may refer to a late 17th-century Venetian needle lace, or a late 19th-century bobbin part lace imitation. A Brussels variant with needle lace pearls is called Rosaline Perlée. The variant made in Bruges lacked the pearls. A variant name for this lace style is Belgian Rococo. Here we refer to the bobbin lace style.

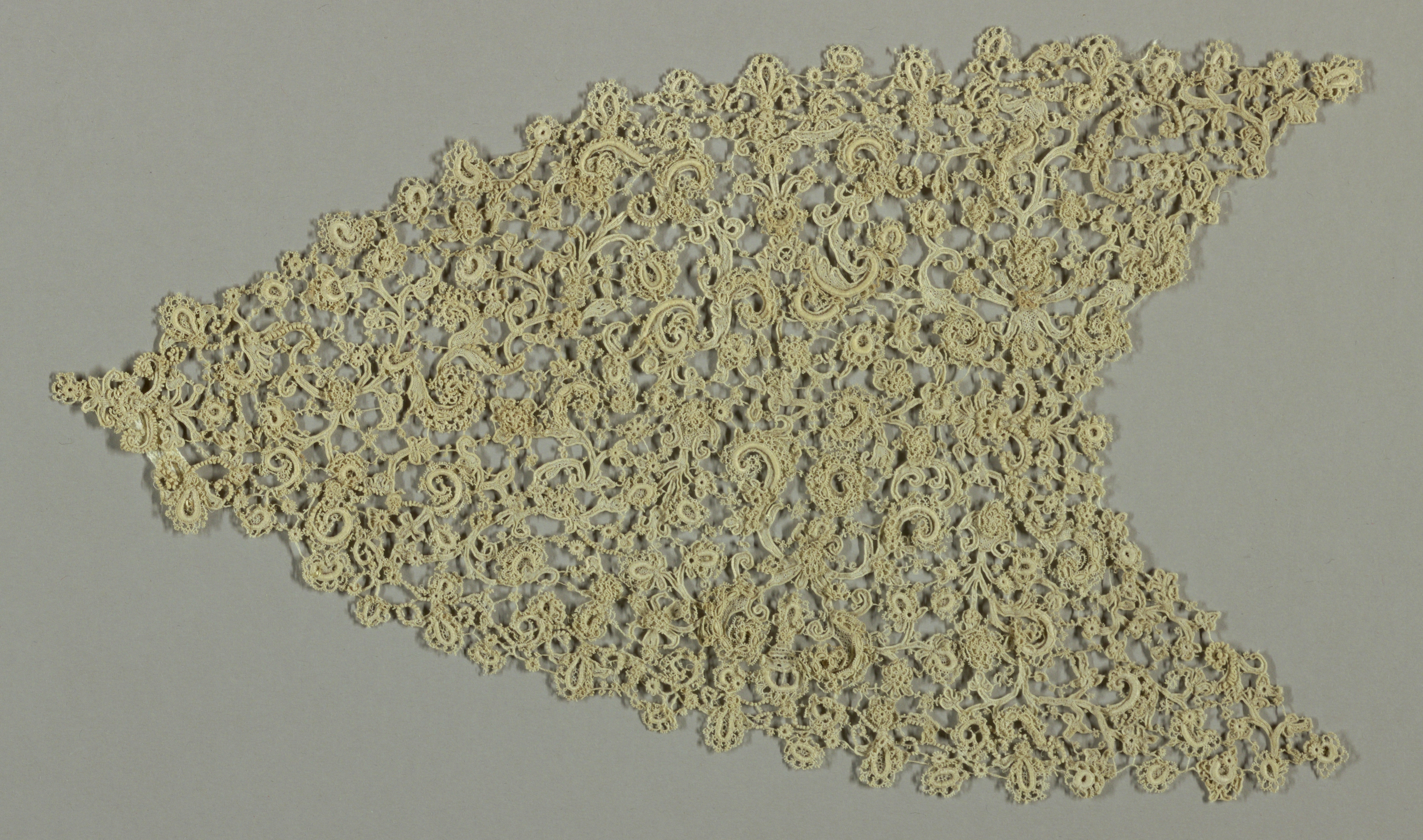
Panel (possibly Belgium), early 18th century, showing the earlier needle lace style that inspired the 19th century style

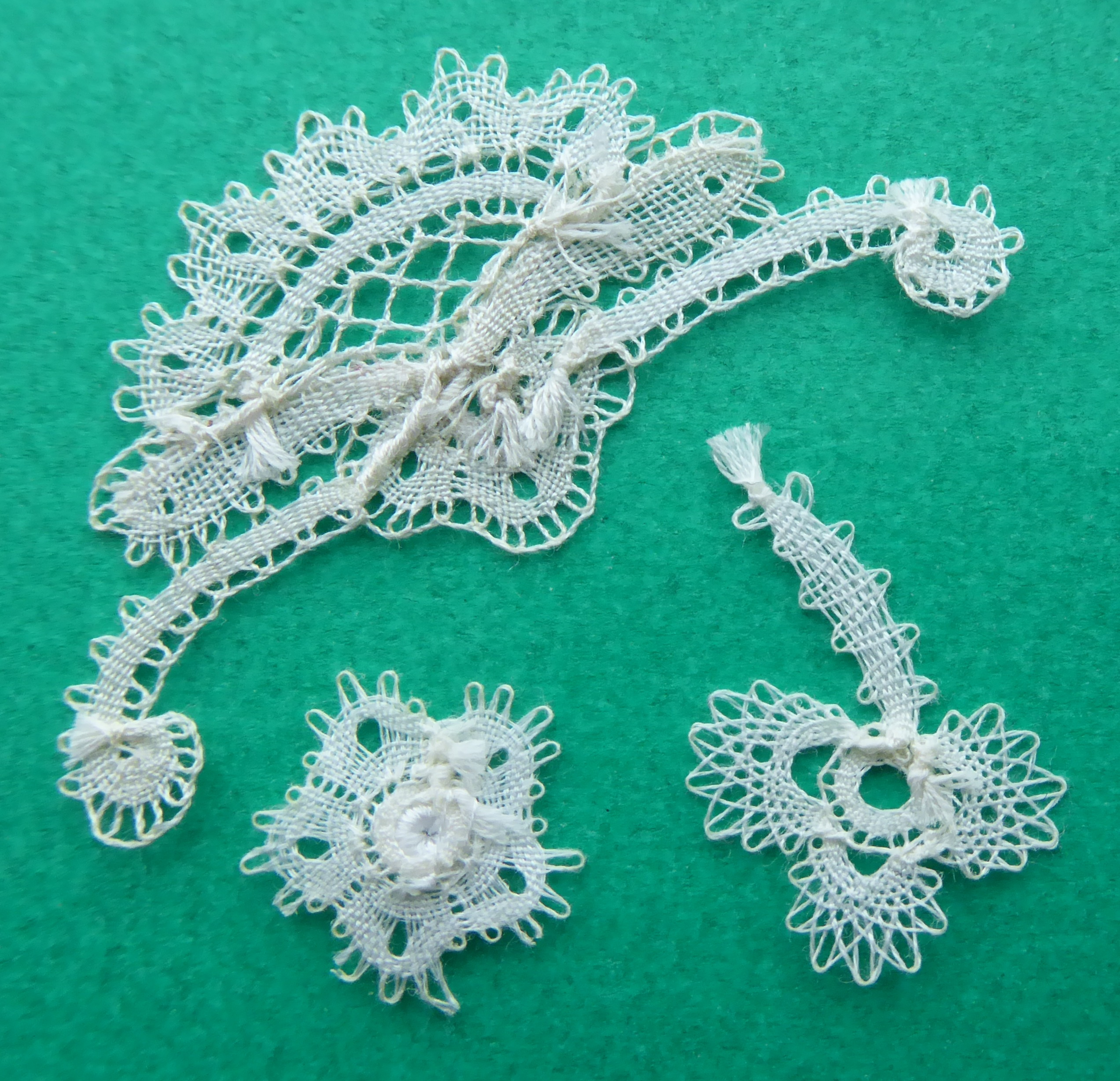
Characteristic bundles on the back of the bobbin lace style

== History ==
In the 1870s the second French empire collapsed, concurrently fashion changed. The cheaper guipures were affected but the better Brussels laces stayed in demand for wedding trousseaux. Designs and technique however remained much the same. Individuality of lace types decreased and interest for making lace as a hobby increased. In the 1880s the lace industry revived with imitations of old laces. Aalst developed a lace with a technique based on Duchesse lace. The frequent little roses gave the lace its name: Rosaline. The same name has been used for a seventeenth century Venetian needle lace with similar design. The Belgian Rosaline was produced until the 1950s and rediscovered in 1980s. The lace is flexible to changing fashion. Worn and unsold pieces could be reassembled.

== Features ==
Characteristic features are the roses with three or five petals, frequently arranged in trails. Unlike the Duchesse, the lace has no gimps. A Brussels variant has needle lace pearls mounted on the hearts of the roses, a Brugges variant lacks the pearls. A special variant connects the flowers with short crinkly edges. Another variant has needle lace fillings. The lace was almost exclusively made of fine linen threads. A piece of lace may look irregular when different parts were created by different people, tension and number of pairs may vary.

The lace requires six or seven pairs. The parts are worked more or less of tapes, mainly in cloth stitch. Each part starts and ends with a bundle, a shortcut for starting and tying off each pair individually. Traditionally these bundles are both on the front and on the back of the lace.

The needle lace pearls are created on a separate needle lace pricking or pattern piece with a buttonhole stitch wrap and then attached to the center of a flower.
