= Rosaline (disambiguation) =

Rosaline is a character in Romeo and Juliet.

Rosaline may also refer to:

- Rosaline (band), American post-hardcore band
- Rosaline lace, late 17th century Venetian needle lace
- Lady Rosaline, a character in Love's Labour's Lost
- Rosaline (film), a 2022 romantic comedy about the Romeo and Juliet character

== People ==
- Rosaline Bozimo (born 1946), Nigerian lawyer and Chief Justice of Delta State
- Rosaline Elbay, Egyptian actress and writer
- Rosaline Margaret Frank (1864–1954), New Zealand photographer
- Rosaline Masson (1867–1947), Scottish writer of novels, biographies, histories and other works

== See also ==
- Rosalina (disambiguation)
