= Alan Haig-Brown =

Canadian novelist and non-fiction writer (born 1941)

Alan Roderick Haig-Brown (born 1941) is a Canadian novelist and non-fiction writer. He specializes in commercial marine and commercial fishing writing and photography. He is a regular contributor to a number of marine publications including Professional Mariner magazine where many of his articles are archived.

He lives in New Westminster, British Columbia and Bangkok, Thailand.

He is the second youngest of four children to Canadian writer Roderick Haig-Brown, who taught him how to hunt and fish, and librarian Ann Elmore Haig-Brown. He grew up in Campbell River, BC. He is the father of film maker Helen Haig-Brown and grandfather to four grandchildren.

== Bibliography ==
- The Suzie A (1991)
- Fishing for a Living (1993)
- Hell No, We Won't Go: Vietnam Draft Resisters in Canada (1996)
- The Fraser River (1996)
- Still Fishin' (2010)
- The Teak Box (2012)
- (co-author) Raincoast Chronicles: Fifth Five (2024)
- Raincoast Chronicles 25 : m̓am̓aɫa Goes Fishing (2025)
