= Roselyn Silva =

São Toméan luxury womenswear designer

- Born: São Tomé and Príncipe
- Occupation: Womenswear designer
- Years active: 2015–present
- Website: roselynsilvaofficial.com

Solidariedade Roselyn Silva, known professionally as Roselyn Silva, is a São Toméan luxury womenswear designer. She emigrated to Portugal as a child and her studio is located in the Chiado neighbourhood in Lisbon.

== Biography ==
Silva was born in São Tomé and Príncipe and emigrated to Portugal with her parents when she was 4 years old. She has her studio in the Chiado neighbourhood in Lisbon.

Silva founded the luxury womenswear Roselyn Silva in 2015. She had a runway showcase at Mozambique Fashion Week 2015. Silva's designs are made with traditional fabrics, dress styles and patterns inspired by São Tomé and Príncipe and the African continent, such as capulana. Silva has also launched the Home Roselyn Silva line of homewares and accessories.

In 2017, Silva presented the fashion television show Está na Moda.

In 2023, Silva held a fashion show in Angola.

In 2024, Silva launched her "solidarity" capsule collection in Lisbon, on World Environment Day, using patchwork fabrics made in partnership with The Alstom Foundation charity's "Women in Action" project.

In 2025, Silva launched her "legacy" collection in partnership with Swarovski jewellery and debuted in Paris.
