= Northland Juices =

American juice company

Northland Cranberries Logo

Northland Juices is a division of Apple & Eve, a juice company based in Port Washington, New York, United States. Apple & Eve, founded by president Gordon Crane in 1975, is one of the largest privately held juice companies in the U.S.

== Company history ==
Apple & Eve LLC, is a privately held company specializing in 100 percent juice and organic juice products. In 1983, Northland Cranberries, Inc. launched its brand of 100% juice cranberry blends in Wisconsin Rapids, Wisconsin, sold through supermarkets, drug store chains, mass merchandisers and food service outlets throughout the United States.

Publicly owned since 1987, Northland Cranberries, Inc.'s branded juice division was acquired by Apple & Eve in 2005, becoming the largest independently owned juice company in the U.S. Apple and Eve was acquired in 2014 by Lassonde Industries.

== Community involvement ==
In the U.S., Northland Juices participates in an annual program called "Drink To Pink" to raise money for breast cancer research. Northland Juices donates 25 cents for each bottle of Northland Dark Fruit Blends bought by consumers redeeming special coupons on purchase. A minimum of $50,000 is donated to The Breast Cancer Research Foundation each year. By March 2011, over $450,000 had been raised.

More recent updates put the total raised at over $850,000, an amount raised during a period of more than 10 years.
