= Rosalyn Benjamin Darling =

American sociologist

Rosalyn Benjamin Darling (born c. 1950) is professor emeritus of sociology at Indiana University of Pennsylvania where she has been a member of the faculty since 1994. Darling is a specialist in orientations towards disability.

She earned her PhD from the University of Connecticut in 1978.

== Selected publications ==
- Families against society: A study of reactions to children with birth defects. SAGE Publications, Beverly Hills, 1979. ISBN 0803912854
- Ordinary families, special children : a systems approach to childhood disability. Guilford Press, New York, 1989. ISBN 0898627427 (With Milton Seligman)
- Families, physicians, and children with special health needs : collaborative medical education models. Auburn House, Westport, Conn., 1994. ISBN 0865692262 (With Margo Peter)
- Families in focus: Sociological methods in early intervention. Pro-Ed, Austin, Tex.: 1996. ISBN 0890796475 (With Christine Baxter)
- Disability and identity: Negotiating self in a changing society. Lynne Rienner Publishers, 2013. ISBN 978-1-58826-864-8
