= Rosalind Brown (headteacher) =

British headmistress at Oxford High School

- Born: Rosalind Brown; 20 January 1872; London, England
- Died: 7 September 1964 (aged 92); Boars Hill, England
- Education: Girton College
- Occupation: Headmistress
- Employer: Oxford High School
- Known for: Education

Rosalind Brown or Rosalind Mabel Haig Brown (20 January 1872 – 7 September 1964) was a British headmistress at Oxford High School for thirty years.

== Life ==
Brown was born in London in 1872. Her father was William Haig Brown who at the time was the headmaster of Charterhouse, but at the time its future was doubtful. Her father would be known as the school's second founder and one of the great headmasters. Her mother was Annie Marion (born Rowsell), and she was one of twelve children that included the Reverend Thomas James Rowsell. Her younger brother was the amateur footballer, writer and soldier Alan Haig-Brown.

After attending Guildford High School, she went on to Girton College, Cambridge, where she took maths and medieval history. She took the mathematical tripos in 1896 and the medieval and modern languages tripos in 1897, being placed with second class and third class honours. Cambridge University did not give women a degree due to discrimination, but she obtained an M.A. degree from Trinity College, Dublin, in 1906.

Meanwhile, she spent four years at Blackheath High School from 1897, before she applied for the headship of Oxford High School. In 1902 she was 29 when she became the headteacher of the school. She set a high standard and was known for talks about ethics. Some of her addresses were published in 1931 under the title "Ad Lucem; Some Addresses by Haig-Brown, R. M." by the Oxford University Press. She opened boarding houses at the school and retired in 1932. After she retired, she supported the United Nations Association and the Oxford City Moral Welfare Association, which reached out to help unmarried mothers.

Brown died at a nursing home in Boars Hill in 1964. She did not marry or have children of her own.
