= Rosalind Brown (novelist) =

British novelist (born 1987)

Rosalind Brown (born 1987) is a British novelist.

== Life ==
She grew up in Cambridge. She graduated from University of Oxford, University of Edinburgh, and University of East Anglia. She is a research fellow at University of East Anglia.

Her work appeared in The Paris Review.

== Works ==
- Brown, Rosalind (2024-06-25). Practice. New York: Farrar, Straus & Giroux. ISBN 978-0-374-61301-3.
