= Thomas James Rowsell =

The Reverend Thomas James Rowsell (13 April 1816 – 23 January 1894) was a popular High Church Anglican preacher of London who was made Honorary chaplain to Queen Victoria.

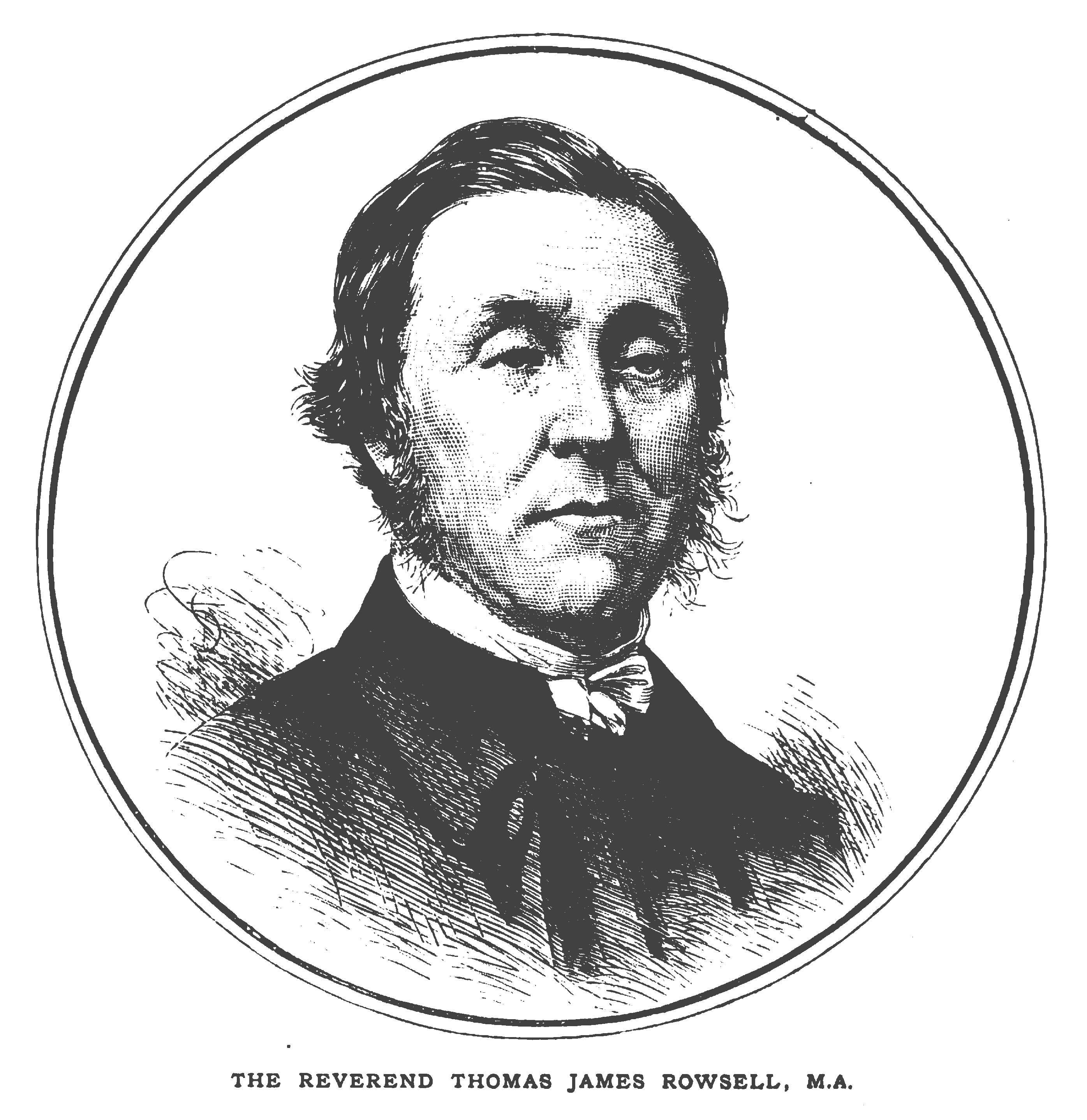
Thomas Rowsell 001

== Early life ==
Thomas was the youngest son and one of 15 children of the lawyer Samuel Rowsell of Tulse Hill in London. He was baptised in St Mary’s church, Lambeth on 24 September 1816 and grew up in South London. His eldest sister Sarah married the famous architect Sir Charles Barry in 1822 when Thomas was six years old. Thomas’ older brother Evan Edward Rowsell was also a priest, and was curate-in-charge of the parish of Brinkley, Cambridgeshire before he was made rector of Hambledon, Surrey about 1859.

== Career ==
Having graduated with a BA from St John’s College, Cambridge in 1838, Rowsell went on to get an MA in 1843. He was appointed domestic chaplain to the Duke of Sutherland and was also a vicar at the Church of St Peter, Cephas Street, Stepney (now converted to flats) from 1844 to 1860. After this he was rector of St Margaret’s, Lothbury from 1860 to 1872, then Vicar, St Stephen’s, Westbourne Park, 1872–83. He was a select preacher at Cambridge from 1859 to 1862. He was appointed honorary chaplain to the Queen in 1866 and chaplain in ordinary from 1869 until his death as well as deputy clerk of the Closet from 1879 to death. Finally he was made Canon of Westminster (part of the Dean and Chapter of Westminster) from 1880 to death. In 1882 Canon Rowsell was at Charles Darwin's funeral at Westminster Abbey.

=== The Queen's Favour ===
The Queen wrote to Prime Minister Benjamin Disraeli, who had favoured Low Church preachers for church appointments, on 18 September 1868, telling him that “any Ultra-Protestant Appt. or at least any Extreme Evangelical one – will only alienate the other party & not please the really moderate men…” The Queen sanctioned Mr. Rowsell, among others, describing him as “a very fine preacher & an admirable parish priest.” Disraeli objected to the Queen’s suggestions on the grounds that none of them had attended the University of Oxford, Rowsell had been to Cambridge. The Queen likely favoured Rowsell because he was a High Church Anglican and had been her honorary chaplain for the past two years. Thomas James Rowsell’s funeral service was held at Westminster Abbey on 27 January 1894.
