= 900 Rosalinde =

Elongated background asteroid

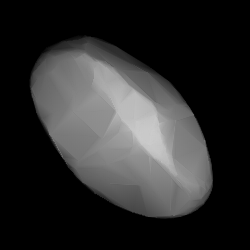
- Modelled shape of Rosalinde from its lightcurve

Discovery
- Discovered by: M. F. Wolf
- Discovery site: Heidelberg Obs.
- Discovery date: 10 August 1918

Designations
- Named after: Character "Rosalinde" in the operetta Die Fledermaus (by Johann Strauss II)
- Alternative designations: A918 PJ · 1918 EC
- Minor planet category: main-belt · (inner) background

Orbital characteristics
- Epoch 31 May 2020 (JD 2459000.5)
- Uncertainty parameter 0
- Observation arc: 101.46 yr (37,057 d)
- Aphelion: 2.8758 AU
- Perihelion: 2.0705 AU
- Semi-major axis: 2.4732 AU
- Eccentricity: 0.1628
- Orbital period (sidereal): 3.89 yr (1,421 d)
- Mean anomaly: 73.490°
- Mean motion: 0° 15^{m} 12.24^{s} / day
- Inclination: 11.559°
- Longitude of ascending node: 182.26°
- Argument of perihelion: 121.78°

Physical characteristics
- Mean diameter: 18.78±1.4 km; 19.56±0.31 km; 19.618±0.057 km
- Synodic rotation period: 16.648±0.009 h
- Pole ecliptic latitude: (276.0°, 70.0°) (λ_{1}/β_{1}); (90.0°, 39.0°) (λ_{2}/β_{2})
- Geometric albedo: 0.085±0.021; 0.096±0.004; 0.1008±0.017
- Spectral type: SD (SMASS-I; Xu); B–V = 0.860±0.020; U–B = 0.390±0.030
- Absolute magnitude (H): 11.6

900 Rosalinde (prov. designation: A918 PJ or 1918 EC) is an elongated background asteroid from the inner regions of the asteroid belt, that has a mean diameter of approximately 19 kilometers (12 miles). It was discovered on 10 August 1918, by astronomer Max Wolf at the Heidelberg-Königstuhl State Observatory in southwest Germany. The lengthy S/D-type asteroid has a rotation period of 16.6 hours. It was likely named after "Rosalinde", a character in the operetta Die Fledermaus by Johann Strauss II.

== Orbit and classification ==
Rosalinde is a non-family asteroid of the main belt's background population when applying the hierarchical clustering method to its proper orbital elements. It orbits the Sun in the inner asteroid belt at a distance of 2.1–2.9 AU once every 3 years and 11 months (1,421 days; semi-major axis of 2.47 AU). Its orbit has an eccentricity of 0.16 and an inclination of 12° with respect to the ecliptic. The body's observation arc begins at Heidelberg-Königstuhl State Observatory with its official discovery observation on 10 August 1918.

== Naming ==
This minor planet was probably named after the character "Rosalinde", Eisenstein's wife, in the operetta Die Fledermaus by Johann Strauss II (1825–1899), after whom 4559 Strauss was named. Rosalinde's maid in the operetta, "Adele", is likely the namesake chosen by Wolf for another asteroid, 812 Adele. Lutz Schmadel, the author of the Dictionary of Minor Planet Names learned about the discoverer's source of inspiration from private communications with Dutch astronomer Ingrid van Houten-Groeneveld, who worked as a young astronomer at the discovering Heidelberg Observatory.

== Physical characteristics ==
Rosalinde is an S-type/D-type in the SMASS-I spectral type-classification by Xu (1995), which surveyed and classified a total of 221 objects. However, Rosalinde's classification, with its moderate albedo of 0.1 (see below) does not correspond to more modern taxonomies such as the Bus–Binzel SMASS classification (II), where the bright S-types and the dark D-types do not have intermediate albedos.

=== Rotation period ===
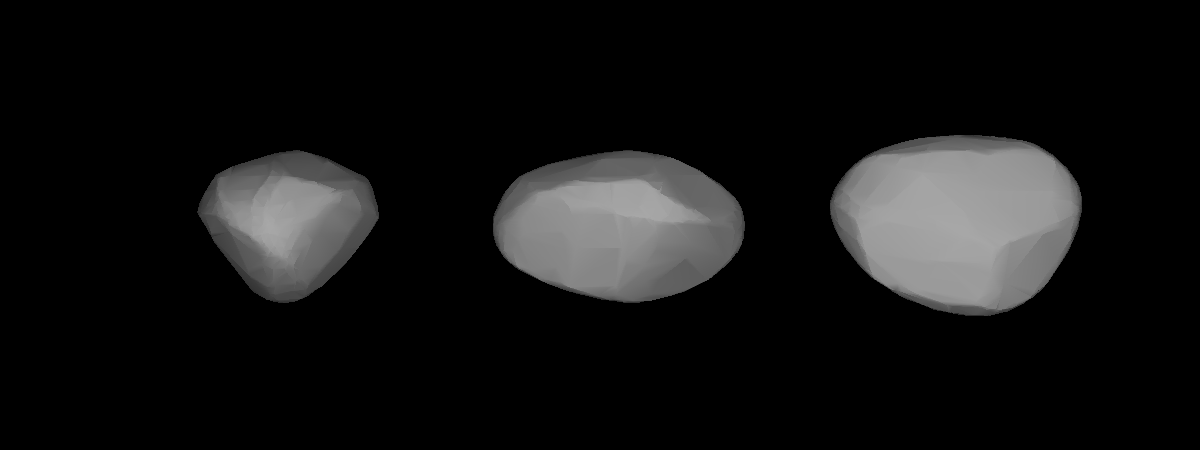
3D-model of Rosalinde based on its lightcurve

In June 2011, a rotational lightcurve of Rosalinde was obtained from photometric observations by Meaghann Stoelting and David DeGraffat at the Stull Observatory (784) of the Alfred University in New York. Lightcurve analysis gave a rotation period of 16.648±0.009 hours with a brightness variation of 0.33±0.02 magnitude (U=2+). Assuming an equatorial view, the observers also constrained the object's elongated shape to be at least 36% longer than wide. The result supersedes a tentative period determination by French amateur astronomer René Roy from May 2007 (U=2). Additional observation by the Spanish OBAS group gave a period of 16.70±0.01 hours with an amplitude of 0.28±0.02 magnitude (U=2/2).

In 2016, a modeled lightcurve gave a concurring sidereal period of 16.6868±0.0002 hours using data from the Uppsala Asteroid Photometric Catalogue, the Palomar Transient Factory survey, and individual observers (such as above), as well as sparse-in-time photometry from the NOFS, the Catalina Sky Survey, and the La Palma surveys (950). The study also determined two spin axes of (276.0°, 70.0°) and (90.0°, 39.0°) in ecliptic coordinates (λ, β).

=== Diameter and albedo ===
According to the survey carried out by the Infrared Astronomical Satellite IRAS, the Japanese Akari satellite, and the NEOWISE mission of NASA's Wide-field Infrared Survey Explorer (WISE), Rosalinde measures (18.78±1.4), (19.56±0.31) and (19.618±0.057) kilometers in diameter and its surface has an albedo of (0.1008±0.017), (0.096±0.004) and (0.085±0.021), respectively. The Collaborative Asteroid Lightcurve Link assumes an albedo of 0.0931 and calculates a diameter of 18.75 kilometers based on an absolute magnitude of 11.83. Alternative mean-diameter measurements published by the WISE team include (18.191±5.124 km), (19.69±6.22 km) and (20.908±0.160 km) with corresponding albedos of (0.131±0.105), (0.13±0.08) and (0.0750±0.0106). On 7 June 2015, an asteroid occultation gave a best-fit ellipse dimension of 19.0 × 19.0 kilometers. These timed observations are taken when the asteroid passes in front of a distant star.
