= Rosalind Blauer =

Canadian economist (1943–1973)

- Born: 24 January 1943; Montreal, Quebec
- Died: 1973 (aged 29–30)

Academic background
- Education: McGill University (Bachelors and Ph.D.); University of Rochester (M.A.)

Rosalind Blauer, née Hyman, (24 January 1943 – 1973) was a Canadian economist who specialized on the effects of inflation and income distribution.

== Personal life and education ==
Blauer was born in Montreal, Canada on 24 January 1943. She graduated with first-class honors from McGill University in 1963 and received her Master of Arts degree from the University of Rochester two years later, accompanied by her husband. They returned to McGill University where Blauer completed her Ph.D. in 1971.

The Blauers adopted a son, Daniel, and Rosalind gave birth to another son, Andrew, in 1972. She lapsed into a coma after a minor surgical procedure in November 1973 and died in Winnipeg, Manitoba a month later.

== Career ==
Blauer and her husband accepted faculty positions at the newly established Brock University in late 1966, where she became the founding member of the economics department. They took a leave of absence in 1972 to take positions with Manitoba's New Democratic Party government where Rosalind became the director of economic analysis in the Cabinet Policy Secretariat.
