= Sun Capital Partners =

American private equity firm

Sun Capital Partners, Inc.
- Type: Private
- Founded: 1995; 31 years ago
- Headquarters: Boca Raton, Florida, United States
- Key people: Rodger Krouse (co-CEO); Marc J. Leder (co-CEO)
- Products: Private Equity Funds
- Website: www.suncappart.com

Sun Capital Partners, Inc., is an American private equity firm specializing in leveraged buyouts. Sun Capital was founded in 1995 by Marc J. Leder and Rodger Krouse, former classmates at the Wharton School of the University of Pennsylvania and investment bankers at Lehman Brothers.

Since its founding in 1995, over 540 companies with a combined >$50 billion in revenue have been invested in by Sun Capital.

According to the company website, their current portfolio consisted of about 40 companies in various different industries, employing about 28,000 people globally.

== History ==
Sun Capital originally formed Emerald through a corporate carveout of food ingredients and industrial specialties divisions of Lubrizol.

It was reported by Spokane WA based The Spokesman-Review on July 9, 2007 Les Wexner, CEO of The Limited was giving up 75% ownership of Limited Brands stores to Sun Capital, receiving no money for the said transfer. In 2006 the 251 store locations with a total annual revenue of $493 million, was said to have been underperforming for years, according to Wexner.

The remaining 25% was transferred to Sun Capital for $32 million in 2010.

In 2015, Sun Capital sold Point Blank Enterprises. Sun Capital originally assembled Point Blank's assets through bankruptcy auction processes.

In 2016, The Wall Street Journal reported that Sun Capital had returned more than 18 times its investment in Critical Flow Solutions after doubling the portfolio company's earnings in less than two years. Sun originally formed Critical Flow in 2015 in a corporate carveout of three business units from Curtiss-Wright Corporation. The Wall Street Journal subsequently reported that Sun Capital's sale of Admiral Petroleum Co. and Lemmen Oil Co. returned 1,530 times Sun Capital's original investment.
