= List of current NHL franchise owners =

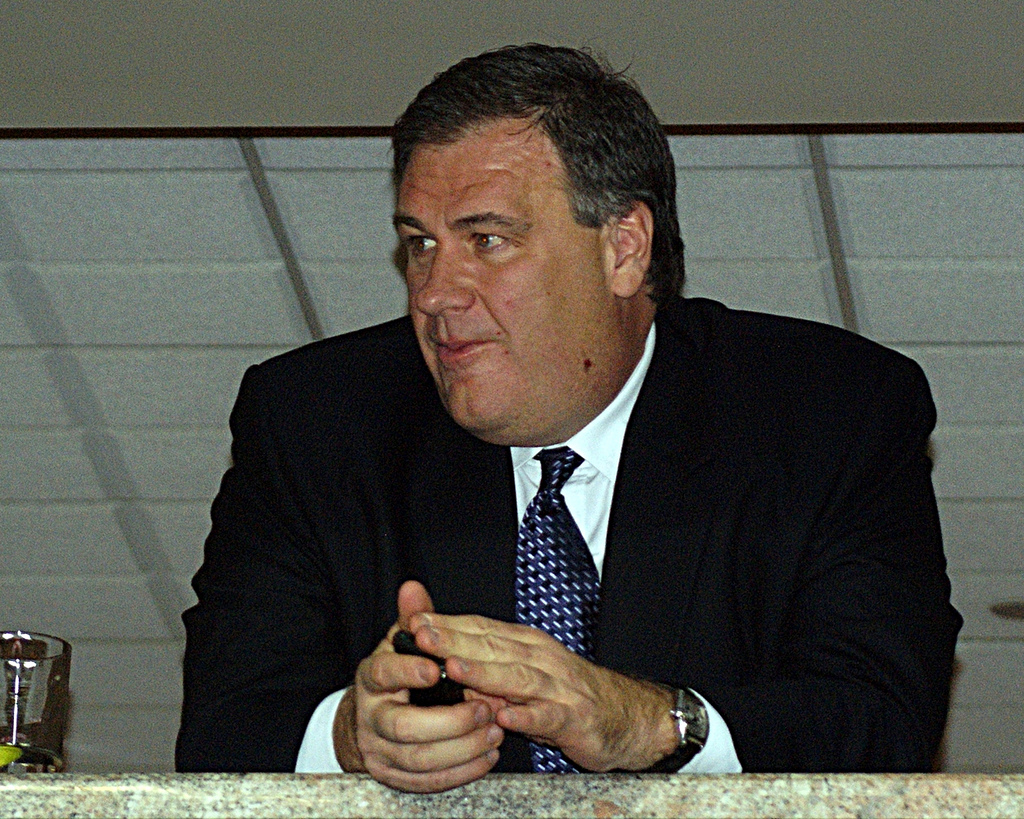
N. Murray Edwards has been the principal owner of the Calgary Flames since 1980. He is the third longest tenured owner in the National Hockey League.

The following is a list of current National Hockey League franchise owners.

All of the NHL's teams use some form of holding company for the team's assets, sometimes through multiple layers of corporations, which are all listed in the "Operating Entities" column. The "Principal Owner(s)" column lists the majority or plurality owner(s) of the team or, in the case of teams held by publicly held corporations, the corporation's chairman.

Each team has a representative on the NHL Board of Governors, the league's ruling and governing body, listed in the "NHL Governor" column; for most teams, this is the majority or plurality owner of the club.

Franchise	Principal owner(s)	NHL Governor	Operating entities	Purchase price (US$ millions)	Adjusted price	Year purchased
Anaheim Ducks	Henry Samueli		Anaheim Ducks Hockey Club LLC	70	$115 million	2005
Boston Bruins	Jeremy Jacobs		Boston Professional Hockey Association, Inc	10	$59.8 million	1975
Buffalo Sabres	Terry and Kim Pegula	Terry Pegula†	Pegula Sports and Entertainment; Hockey Western New York, LLC	165	$236 million	2011
Calgary Flames	N. Murray Edwards		Calgary Sports and Entertainment	16	$62.5 million	1980
Carolina Hurricanes	Tom Dundon		Gale Force Sports And Entertainment, LLC; Carolina Hurricanes Hockey Club	420	$538 million	2018
Chicago Blackhawks	Danny Wirtz		Chicago Blackhawk Hockey Team, Inc.	1	$12 million	1954
Colorado Avalanche	Ann Walton Kroenke	Josh Kroenke‡	Kroenke Sports & Entertainment; Colorado Avalanche, LLC	202	$378 million	2000
Columbus Blue Jackets	John P. McConnell		Colhoc Limited Partnership; The Columbus Blue Jackets Hockey Club	80 & 173	$160 million & $243 million	1997 & 2012
Dallas Stars	Tom Gaglardi		Dallas Stars LP	240	$343 million	2011
Detroit Red Wings	Marian Ilitch	Christopher Ilitch	Ilitch Holdings Inc.; Olympia Entertainment; Detroit Red Wings, Inc.	8.5	$28.4 million	1982
Edmonton Oilers	Daryl Katz		Rexall Sports Corporation; Oilers Entertainment Group	170	$254 million	2008
Florida Panthers	Vincent Viola		Sunrise Sports and Entertainment; Florida Panthers Hockey Club, Ltd.	160	$221 million	2013
Los Angeles Kings	Philip Anschutz and Edward P. Roski	Philip Anschutz†	Anschutz Entertainment Group, The Los Angeles Kings Hockey Club LP	113.3	$239 million	1995
Minnesota Wild	Craig Leipold		Minnesota Sports and Entertainment; Minnesota Wild Hockey Club, LP	225	$336 million	2008
Montreal Canadiens	Molson Family	Geoff Molson‡	Club de hockey Canadien, Inc.	575	$863 million	2009
Nashville Predators	Bill Haslam^{1}		Predators Holdings LLC	775	$853 million	2025
New Jersey Devils	David Blitzer and Josh Harris	Tad Brown	Harris Blitzer Sports & Entertainment	320	$442 million	2013
New York Islanders	Jon Ledecky and Scott D. Malkin	Scott D. Malkin†	New York Islanders Hockey Club, LP	485	$651 million	2016
New York Rangers	James L. Dolan		The Madison Square Garden Company, New York Rangers Hockey Club	195	$391 million	1997
Ottawa Senators	Michael Andlauer		Senators Sports & Entertainment; Ottawa Senators Hockey Club Limited Partnership	950	$1 billion	2023
Philadelphia Flyers	Brian L. Roberts	Dan Hilferty	Comcast Spectacor; Philadelphia Flyers, LP	150	$308 million	1996
Pittsburgh Penguins	Geoff Hoffmann and Greg Hoffmann	Geoff Hoffmann†	Hoffmann Family of Companies	1,700	$1.7 billion	2025
San Jose Sharks	Hasso Plattner		Sharks Sports and Entertainment; San Jose Sports & Entertainment Enterprises; San Jose Sharks, LLC	147	$263 million	2002
Seattle Kraken	Samantha Holloway, Jerry Bruckheimer and Tod Leiweke	Samantha Holloway†	One Roof Sports and Entertainment	650	$833 million	2018
St. Louis Blues	Tom Stillman and Alan Fritch		SLB Acquisition Holdings LLC; St. Louis Blues Hockey Club, L.P.	180	$252 million	2012
Tampa Bay Lightning	Jeffrey Vinik		Lightning Hockey LP	93	$137 million	2010
Toronto Maple Leafs	Edward S. Rogers III		Maple Leaf Sports & Entertainment, Ltd.	263 & 1,000	$540 million & $1.4 billion	1996 & 2012
Utah Mammoth	Ryan Smith		Smith Entertainment Group	1,200	$1.23 billion	2024
Vancouver Canucks	Francesco Aquilini		Canucks Sports & Entertainment	207	$341 million	2005
Vegas Golden Knights	Bill Foley		Black Knight Sports & Entertainment, Hockey Vision Las Vegas	500	$671 million	2016
Washington Capitals	Ted Leonsis		Monumental Sports & Entertainment	85	$164 million	1999
Winnipeg Jets	Mark Chipman and David Thomson	Mark Chipman†	True North Sports & Entertainment, Ltd.	170	$243 million	2011

† Only one of the owners can be that team's NHL Governor.
‡ Child/family member of the team's owner.
^{1} Haslam bought the Predators over a period of three years, he acquired enough shares to become the majority owner in July 2025.

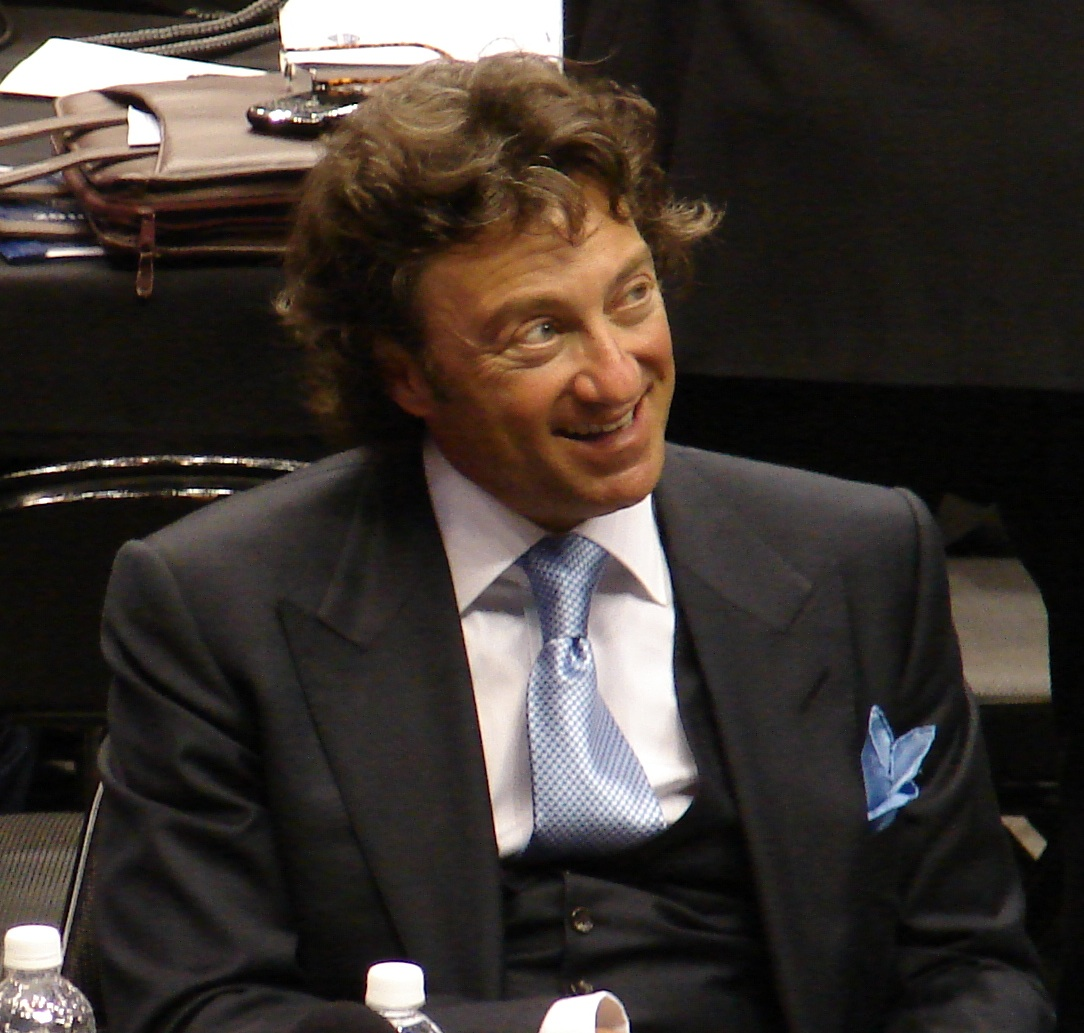
Daryl Katz, Edmonton Oilers

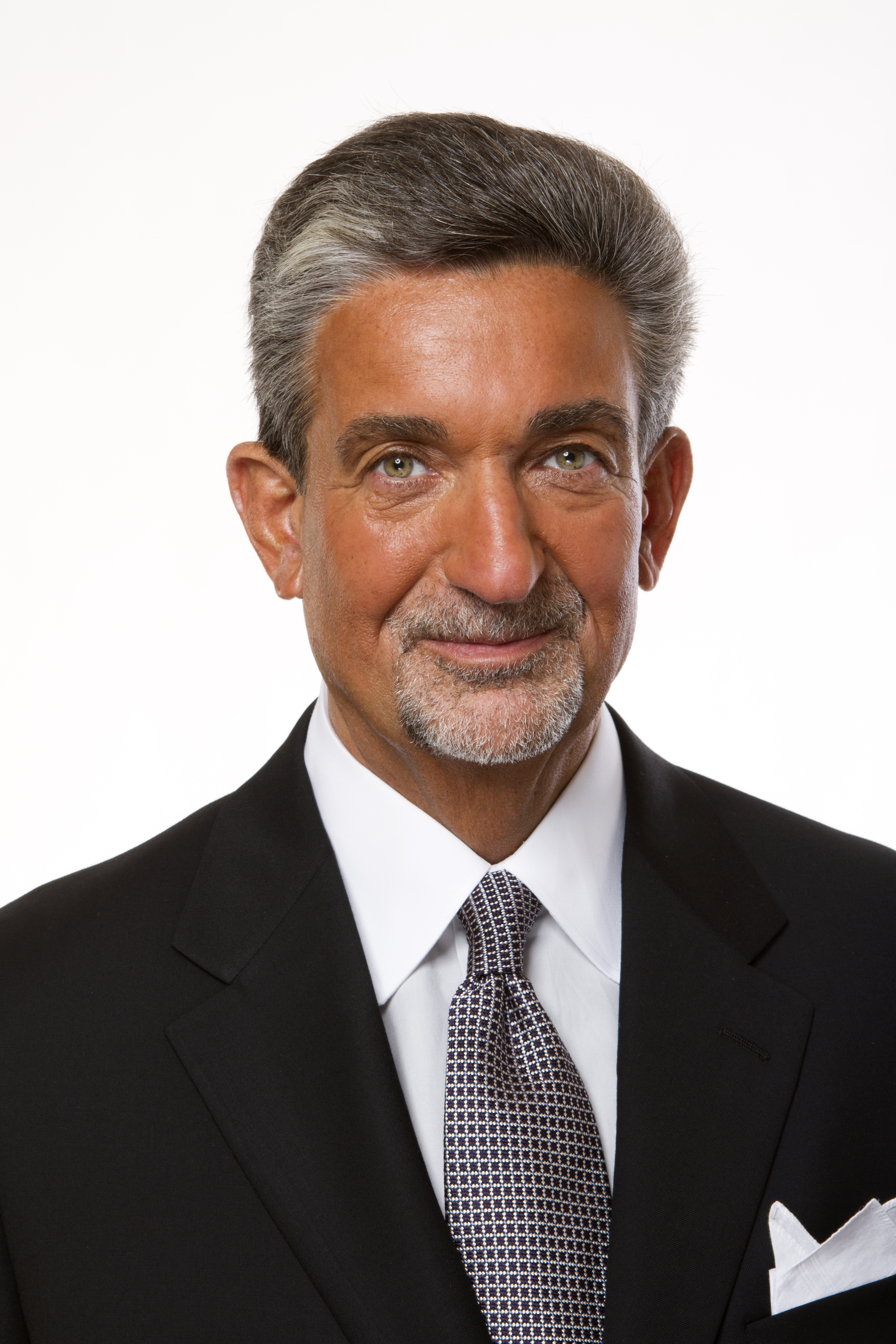
Ted Leonsis, Washington Capitals

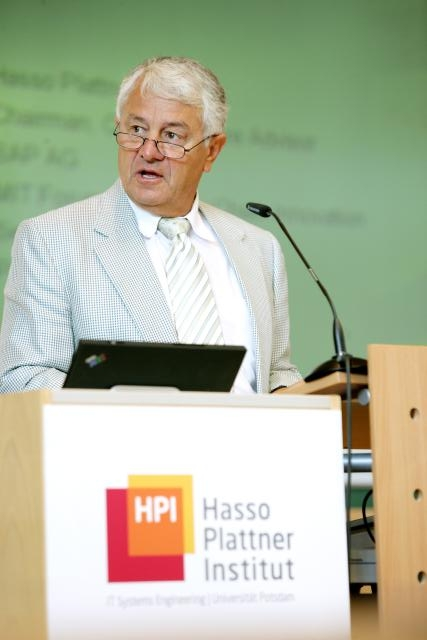
Hasso Plattner, San Jose Sharks

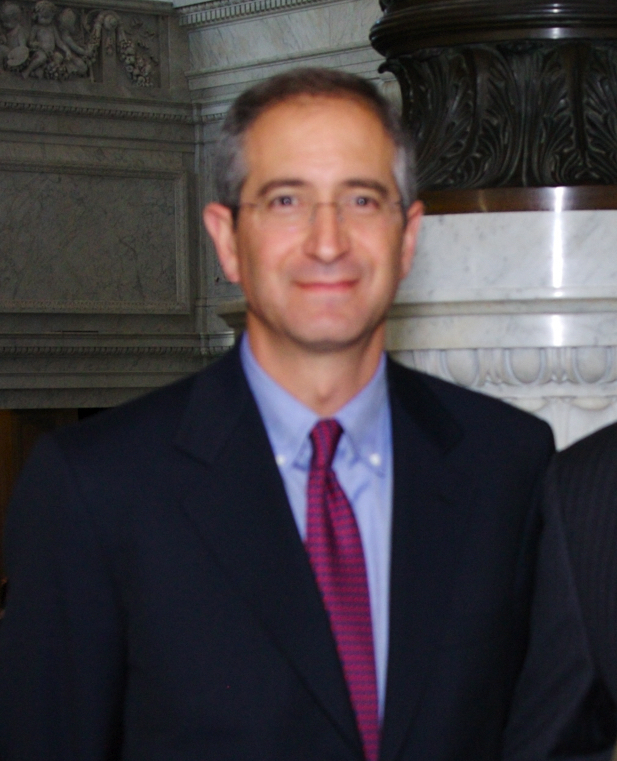
Brian L. Roberts, Philadelphia Flyers

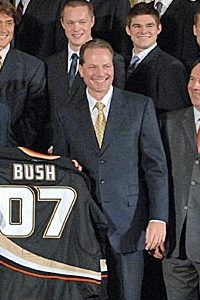
Henry Samueli, Anaheim Ducks

== See also ==
- NHL Enterprises, LP
- List of NFL franchise owners
- List of NBA team owners
- List of Major League Baseball principal owners
- List of MLS team owners
