= Chase Fieldhouse =

Arena in Wilmington, Delaware, US

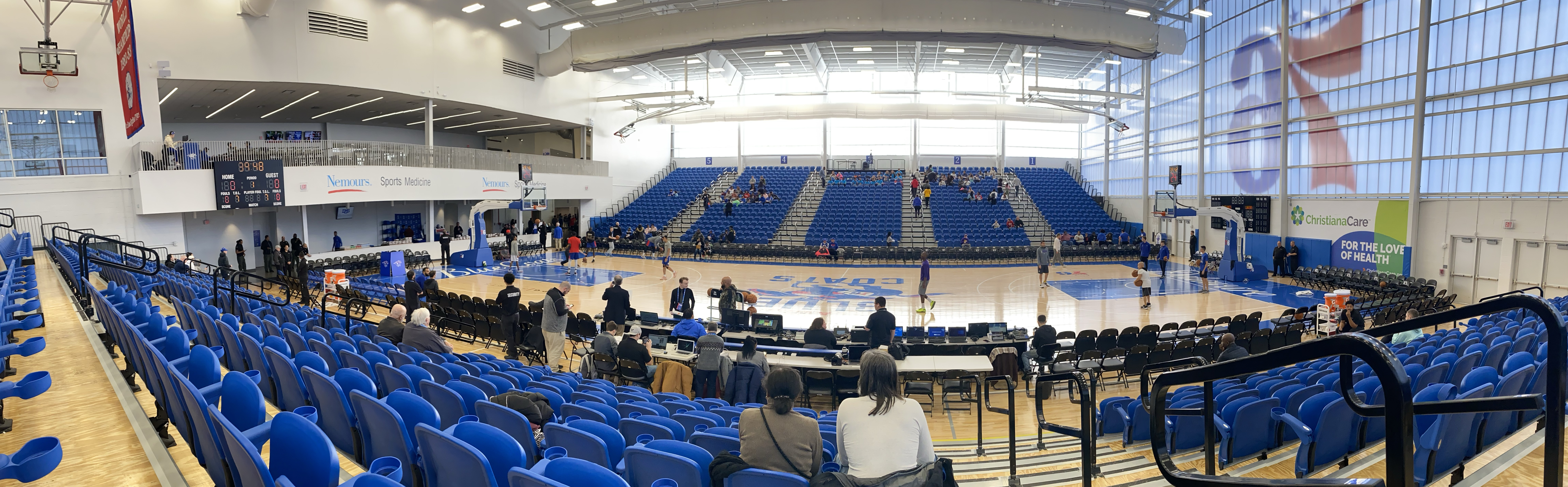
- A panorama of Chase Fieldhouse

- Location within Delaware Location within the United States
- Former names: 76ers Fieldhouse (2019–2021)
- Address: 401 Garasches Lane
- Location: Wilmington, Delaware
- Coordinates: 39.727582°N 75.554497°W
- Owner: Buccini/Pollin Group
- Operator: BPG Sports
- Capacity: 2,500
- Acreage: 8.9

Construction
- Built: August 2018–January 2019
- Opened: January 23, 2019
- Cost: $37 million
- Project manager: Harris Blitzer Sports & Entertainment

Tenants
- Delaware Blue Coats (NBA G League) (2019–present); Delaware Bullsharks (AAL2) (2024)

Website
- thechasefieldhouse.com

The Chase Fieldhouse, originally known as the 76ers Fieldhouse, is a 2,500-seat multi-purpose arena and sports complex in Wilmington, Delaware, United States. The arena opened in 2019 and is home to the Delaware Blue Coats of the NBA G League team, an affiliate of the NBA's Philadelphia 76ers.

== History ==
On November 29, 2017, Harris Blitzer Sports & Entertainment announced plans for arena and sports complex in Wilmington, Delaware. Known as 76ers Fieldhouse, the facility opened in January 2019 and began hosting Delaware Blue Coats games. The arena was featured on an episode of the ESPN sports talk series First Take in September 2019. In February 2021, JPMorgan Chase bought naming rights to the complex and renamed it Chase Fieldhouse. It has hosted the Atlantic 10 women's basketball championship since 2022.

== Features ==
- Three NBA size basketball courts
- One indoor 100-by-70-yard (91 m × 64 m) turf field for soccer
- One outdoor 120-by-75-yard (110 m × 69 m) turf field with lighting for soccer
- Performance and training facility
- Retail and office space

== See also ==
- Philadelphia 76ers Training Complex
