= Philadelphia WNBA team =

Future Women's National Basketball Association team based in Philadelphia

- Conference: Eastern
- League: WNBA
- Founded: June 30, 2025; 14 months ago
- Arena: New South Philadelphia Arena (2030–future) (Note: Harris Blitzer Sports & Entertainment has expressed hope that the arena will be completed for the 2030 WNBA season, however, if not, the team will begin play at Xfinity Mobile Arena.)
- Location: Philadelphia, Pennsylvania, U.S.
- Ownership: Harris Blitzer Sports & Entertainment; (Josh Harris and David Blitzer) (Note: Comcast Spectacor holds a minority stake)
- Website: www.wnba.com/philadelphia

The Philadelphia WNBA team is an American professional basketball team based in Philadelphia. Established in 2025, the team will compete in the Women's National Basketball Association (WNBA) and is scheduled to begin play in 2030. The team was founded by Josh Harris and David Blitzer of Harris Blitzer Sports & Entertainment, owners of the Philadelphia 76ers, and will share their venue at New South Philadelphia Arena upon completion.

== History ==
In January 2025, Philadelphia 76ers and Harris Blitzer Sports & Entertainment (HBSE) managing partner Josh Harris submitted a bid for an expansion team. When Harris partnered with Comcast Spectacor to build a new arena, the priority was to house a Women's National Basketball Association (WNBA) team along with the 76ers and the NHL's Philadelphia Flyers. On June 30, the WNBA announced Philadelphia had been awarded a new franchise, which will join the league in the 2030 season. While the team will share a home with the 76ers at the New South Philadelphia Arena upon its completion in 2031, Harris expressed hope that the arena would be completed in 2030; if not, the team will play at Xfinity Mobile Arena.
