= ComcastTIX =

ComcastTIX is a regional consumer ticketing company powered by New Era Tickets. Comcast Spectacor, the Philadelphia-based sports and entertainment firm, in a partnership with Comcast Cable, launched ComcastTIX on September 12, 2006. ComcastTIX is a provider of customized ticketing and fan marketing to sports and entertainment organizations.

ComcastTIX provides clients with the power to set all consumer fees, control all selling options to the consumer, and collect and use customer data for targeted marketing and sales communications. Services included by ComcastTIX consist of a 24/7 call center, order fulfillment (including express mail option), marketing communications, retail outlets, customer service, technical support, and ticketing system training.

In addition to purchasing tickets on the website, consumers can also buy tickets over the phone or at select Acme Markets. Tickets are available at designated Arenas box offices through ComcastTIX as well. ComcastTIX informs customers of upcoming events to keep them up to date and to retain their loyalty. Consumers can purchase tickets for sporting events, concerts, comedy shows, and more for events at a variety of venues throughout select parts of the country.

ComcastTIX primarily serves the Philadelphia, South Jersey, Delaware, and Maryland region.

== Clients ==
East

- Appel Farm Festival - Elmer, New Jersey
- Borgata Casino - Atlantic City, New Jersey
- Dover International Speedway - Dover, Delaware
- Excelon Golf Invitational - Philadelphia, Pennsylvania
- Helium Comedy Club - Philadelphia, Pennsylvania
- Liacouras Center - Philadelphia, Pennsylvania
- New Jersey Motorsports Park - Millville, New Jersey
- Penn Relays - Philadelphia, Pennsylvania
- Pocono Raceway - Long Pond, Pennsylvania
- Society Hill Playhouse - Philadelphia, Pennsylvania
- Sun National Bank Center - Trenton, New Jersey
  - Trenton Devils
- Wachovia Center - Philadelphia, Pennsylvania
  - Philadelphia 76ers
  - Philadelphia Flyers
  - Philadelphia Soul
  - Philadelphia Wings
- World Team Tennis - King of Prussia, Pennsylvania

Central

- Budweiser Events Center - Loveland, Colorado
- Colorado Eagles Hockey - Loveland, Colorado
- Richard M. Borchard Regional Fairgrounds - Robstown, Texas

West

- Portland Trail Blazers - Portland, Oregon
- Portland Trail Blazers Premium Seating - Portland, Oregon
- Rose Quarter - Portland, Oregon
