= Bob Myers =

American basketball player and sports executive (born 1975)

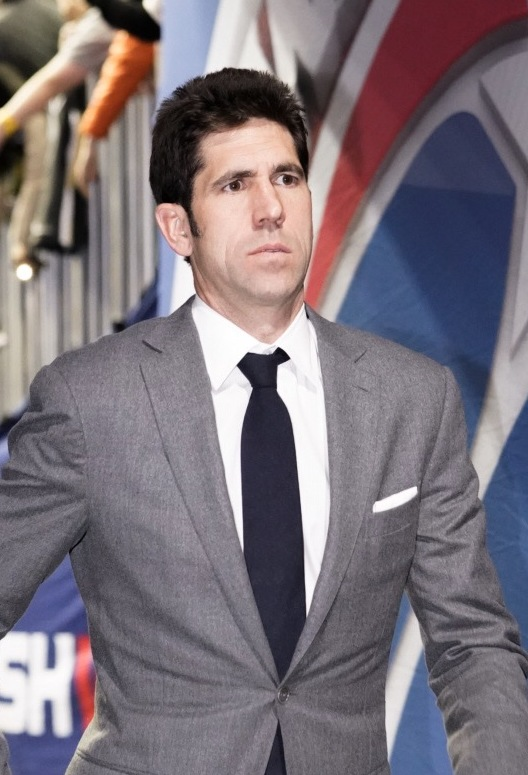
- Myers in 2019
- Born: March 31, 1975 (age 51)
- Occupation: Sports executive
- Title: President, Harris Blitzer Sports & Entertainment
- Basketball career

Personal information
- Listed height: 6 ft 7 in (2.01 m)
- Listed weight: 230 lb (104 kg)

Career information
- High school: Monte Vista (Danville, California)
- College: UCLA (1993–1997)
- Position: Forward
- Number: 24

Career highlights
- As a player: NCAA champion (1995); As an executive: 4× NBA champion (2015, 2017, 2018, 2022); 2× NBA Executive of the Year (2015, 2017)

Robert Michael Myers (born March 31, 1975) is an American sports executive who is the president of Harris Blitzer Sports & Entertainment (HBSE). Myers was previously the general manager for the Golden State Warriors of the National Basketball Association (NBA) from 2012 to 2023, winning four NBA championships and two NBA Executive of the Year awards during his tenure.

Myers played college basketball for the UCLA Bruins from 1993 to 1997, winning a national championship in 1995. He served as a radio commentator for UCLA basketball and worked as a sports agent under Arn Tellem in the early 2000s. Myers was an ESPN NBA game analyst from 2023 until being named president of HBSE in 2025. He additionally serves as an advisor for the National Football League (NFL) team Washington Commanders.

== Early life ==
Myers was born on March 31, 1975, and grew up in Danville, California, a town in the San Francisco Bay Area. He attended Monte Vista High School and lettered in basketball. Only a junior college showed interest in recruiting him. He wanted to continue playing an organized sport, and intended to follow his brother into rowing. In his senior year, he visited the University of California, Los Angeles (UCLA) and intended to talk to their crew team coach. However, he ran into UCLA assistant basketball coach Steve Lavin, who suggested Myers try out for the basketball team.

== College career ==
Myers attended UCLA and majored in business economics, making the Bruins basketball team under coach Jim Harrick as a walk-on in his freshman year in 1993. Myers figured he would be a four-year practice player, but he earned an athletic scholarship in 1994–95, when the Bruins won the national championship that season. He did not score until the final game of the regular season, and he only averaged 0.3 points that season. However, he was on the commemorative cover of Sports Illustrated, lifting teammate Tyus Edney in the air after the point guard made a legendary baseline-to-baseline winning basket with 4.8 seconds remaining in the game against Missouri in the tournament. Additionally, Myers met President Bill Clinton in the White House, appeared with Jay Leno on The Tonight Show, and rode with Mickey Mouse in a ticker tape parade at Disneyland. He was called Forrest Gump by teammates for his apparent good fortune.

Myers' playing time steadily increased. By his junior year, he had added 25 pounds (11 kg) of muscle over two years and stood at 6 feet 7 inches (2.01 m) and 230 pounds (100 kg). Against Oregon State, Myers was the hero in the Bruins' 69–60 win after he established career highs in points (20) and minutes played (22). During his final season in 1996–97, UCLA advanced to the Elite Eight, Myers started in four games. "That's another thing that I thought that I would never do," Myers said. "It's something that I will look back on and tell my kids and my grandkids: 'Yeah, I started a couple of games.'" He did not go to Europe to play basketball after college, which he later called his biggest disappointment.

== Professional career ==
=== Sports agent ===
In 1997, Myers began working as a sports agent intern at Arn Tellem's agency Tellem and Associates while completing his Juris Doctor degree at Loyola Law School. Myers grew to be one of Tellem's top assistants, cited for his skill in contract negotiation and player recruitment. Tellem and Associates became SFX Sports in 2000, with Myers then serving as its vice president. Myers spent 14 years as an agent, the last five with Wasserman Media Group, and he negotiated contracts totaling more than $575 million. He had 19 clients, including Brandon Roy, Tyreke Evans, and Kendrick Perkins.

=== Golden State Warriors ===
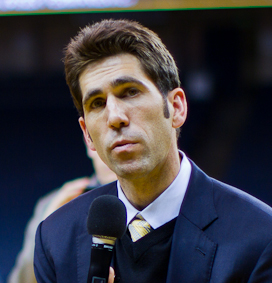
Myers won four NBA championships and two NBA Executive of the Year awards as Golden State Warriors general manager.

In April 2011, Myers was hired by the Golden State Warriors as an assistant general manager. He was expected to apprentice under general manager Larry Riley for a few years. However, on April 24, 2012, Myers was promoted to general manager after only 11 months. Under Myers, the Warriors had a strong draft in 2012 and made key acquisitions in 2012–13, and they advanced to the second round of the playoffs before losing to the San Antonio Spurs in six games. It was the Warriors' best postseason finish in 36 years. After the season, The Press Democrat wrote that Myers "made a bigger imprint than anyone else on this season's wonder team."

After the 2014–15 regular season, Myers was named the NBA Executive of the Year after key decisions he made led to the Warriors having an NBA best 67–15 record, including hiring coach Steve Kerr and signing Klay Thompson to a contract extension after declining to trade him and other players in the offseason for Kevin Love. Myers and the Warriors won the 2015 NBA Finals after defeating the Cleveland Cavaliers in six games. The Warriors came short of back-to-back titles in the 2015–16 season despite having an NBA-record 73–9 regular season, losing to the Cavaliers in seven games of the 2016 NBA Finals.

Prior to 2016–17, the Warriors added president of basketball operations to Myers' title, which reported directly to majority owner Joe Lacob. Myers was again named NBA Executive of the Year after signing Kevin Durant, David West, Zaza Pachulia, and JaVale McGee in the 2016 off-season. This was his second Executive of the Year title in three years as the Warriors once again had a league-best 67–15 record. The Warriors won the 2017 NBA Finals after avenging their loss to the Cavaliers, this time in five games. The title was the team's second in three years, which included the league's best postseason record of 16–1, and the best start to the postseason at 15–0. The Warriors won back-to-back titles in the 2017–18 season after defeating the Cavaliers in four games in the 2018 NBA Finals. The Warriors won again in the 2022 NBA Finals, defeating the Boston Celtics in six games.

He stepped down as Warriors president and general manager in May 2023.

=== Broadcasting ===
Myers worked as a radio commentator for UCLA basketball in the early 2000s. He worked at ESPN from August 2023 to October 2025 as a game analyst and occasional color commentator for NBA Countdown, NBA Saturday Primetime, NBA Sunday Showcase, and NBA Today.

=== Harris Blitzer Sports & Entertainment (HBSE) ===
Myers left ESPN to be named president of Harris Blitzer Sports & Entertainment (HBSE), managing entity of the NBA's Philadelphia 76ers and NHL's New Jersey Devils, on October 16, 2025. He also works with HBSE managing partner Josh Harris as a special advisor for his National Football League (NFL) team Washington Commanders. He aided with the team's hiring of general manager Adam Peters and head coach Dan Quinn in January 2024 and often advises the team on organizational culture and identifying character traits of free agents and NFL draft prospects. Myers briefly served as interim president of the 76ers in May 2026 following the firing of Daryl Morey and prior to Mike Gansey being hired for the role.

=== Other roles ===
Myers was appointed to the Board of Regents of the University of California in November 2024. Myers gave the commencement speech to the 2025 graduating class of Harvard Law School that May; he was invited by senior graduate and college teammate Ike Nwankwo. In September 2025, he joined a search committee led by UCLA Bruins athletic director Martin Jarmond to assist with finding their next head football coach.

== Personal life ==
Myers and his wife, Kristen, have three daughters.
