= Global Spectrum =

Global Spectrum may refer to:

- Comcast Spectacor
- Spectrum of a ring#Global or relative Spec
