= Ed Snider =

American sports executive (1933–2016)

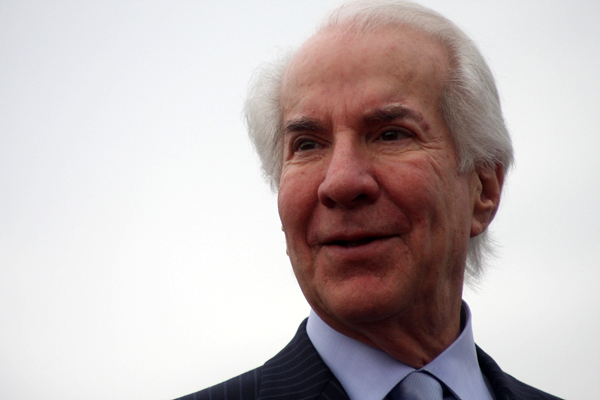
- Snider in 2010
- Born: Edward Malcolm Snider; January 6, 1933; Washington, D.C., U.S.
- Died: April 11, 2016 (aged 83); Montecito, California, U.S.
- Education: University of Maryland
- Occupation: Chairman
- Spouse(s): Myrna Gordon (divorced); Martha McGeary (divorced); Christine Decroix (divorced); Lin Spivak (2013–2016; his death)
- Children: 4 with Myrna Gordon; 2 with Martha McGeary
- Awards: Hockey Hall of Fame (1988); Philadelphia Flyers Hall of Fame (1989); Jewish Sports Hall of Fame (1997); Philadelphia's Greatest Mover and Shaker of the Millennium (Philadelphia Daily News) (1999); United States Hockey Hall of Fame (2011)

Edward Malcolm Snider (January 6, 1933 – April 11, 2016) was an American business executive. He was the chairman of Comcast Spectacor, a Philadelphia-based sports and entertainment company that owns the Philadelphia Flyers of the National Hockey League (NHL); Xfinity Mobile Arena; the regional sports network Comcast SportsNet; and Global Spectrum, an international facilities management company. He formerly owned the Philadelphia 76ers of the National Basketball Association (NBA) and ran the Philadelphia Eagles of the National Football League (NFL) for a few years in the 1960s.

== Early life and education ==
Snider was born to a Jewish family in the Washington, D.C. region, the son of a grocery-store chain owner. He attended the University of Maryland and earned his bachelor's degree in accounting.

== Business career ==
Snider started a record company, Edge Ltd., with his friend Jerry Lilienfield in the 1960s, which was moderately successful. They eventually shut down the company, giving Snider the opportunity to join Jerry Wolman (builder) and Snider's brother-in-law Earl Foreman (attorney) as they purchased the Philadelphia Eagles in 1964. Snider was given an option to purchase a 7% stake in the team and eventually served as vice president and treasurer, running the day-to-day operations of the Eagles.

Upon learning that the NHL was planning to expand, Snider and Wolman made plans for a new arena—the Spectrum—to house both a hockey team and the 76ers. On February 8, 1966, the NHL awarded Philadelphia a conditional franchise, one which would eventually be named the Philadelphia Flyers and start playing in 1967. In the summer of 1967, Snider and Wolman ended their business partnership and exchanged some of their business assets. Snider became the majority owner of the Flyers and Wolman became sole owner of the Spectrum. When Wolman placed the Spectrum in bankruptcy in 1971, Snider and Foreman took over the building, eventually paying off every creditor in full. In 1974 Snider created Spectacor as a holding company for the executives that ran the Flyers and the Spectrum. The Flyers became the first NHL expansion team to win the Stanley Cup in 1974, and to repeat as champions in 1975.

Snider would found or acquire several businesses during his career, most notably a regional premium cable channel, PRISM, and the first all-sports radio station, WIP. Amidst a lengthy battle with 76ers owner Harold Katz, the city of Philadelphia, and the city of Camden, New Jersey, Snider privately-financed a new arena to keep the Flyers and 76ers in Philadelphia, what would become the CoreStates Center (now Xfinity Mobile Arena).

Prior to the CoreStates Center's opening in 1996, he sold a 66% stake of all of his businesses, including Spectacor, to Philadelphia-based Comcast, creating Comcast-Spectacor. However, Snider remained chairman of the venture, retaining a minority interest. As part of the deal, Comcast also purchased the 76ers, who had been Snider's tenants since 1971. Snider and Comcast CEO Brian Roberts became very close friends and business partners, remaining each other's closest advisor until Snider's death.

Soon after, Comcast-Spectacor created Comcast SportsNet in 1996. Comcast-Spectacor was also granted an expansion franchise in the AHL, the Philadelphia Phantoms. In a 1999 Philadelphia Daily News poll, Snider was selected as the city's greatest sports mover and shaker, beating out legends such as Connie Mack, Sonny Hill, Bert Bell, and Roger Penske.

== Nonprofit organizations ==
In 1985, Snider was one of the founding contributors of the Ayn Rand Institute (ARI), which was established by the philosopher Leonard Peikoff to promote Rand's philosophy of Objectivism. In 1990, after a dispute between ARI and philosopher David Kelley, Snider became a backer of Kelley's rival organization, the Institute for Objectivist Studies (now known as The Atlas Society).

In 2003, Snider became a founding board member of the National Foundation for Celiac Awareness (now named Beyond Celiac). He continued to support the organization until his death in 2016.

In 2005, Snider created the Ed Snider Youth Hockey Foundation to provide a means to reach inner-city, resource lacking children in the Philadelphia area and provide them with the opportunity to learn to play hockey.

In 2014, Snider donated $5 million to the University of Maryland to create the Ed Snider Center for Enterprise and Markets, a part of the Robert H. Smith School of Business that educates students about capitalism, markets, and enterprise.

Snider also created The Snider Foundation, a charitable family foundation, which continued to operate after his death. The foundation donated millions of dollars annually to causes he believed in, including Jewish causes and educational programs.

== Honors and awards ==
In 1988, Snider was inducted into the Hockey Hall of Fame.

In 1989, Snider was inducted into the Philadelphia Flyers Hall of Fame alongside Keith Allen and Bill Barber.

In 1997, Snider was inducted into the Philadelphia Jewish Sports Hall of Fame.

In 1999, Snider was named Philadelphia's "Greatest Mover and Shaker of the Millennium" by the Philadelphia Daily News.

In 2005, Snider was inducted into the Philadelphia Sports Hall of Fame. In 2011, Snider was inducted into the United States Hockey Hall of Fame.

In 2012, the Philadelphia Sports Writers Association renamed its Humanitarian Award as the Ed Snider Lifetime Distinguished Humanitarian Award, with Ed Snider as the first recipient of the newly named award.

== Personal life ==
Snider has six children. He had 15 grandchildren at the time of his death. Jay Snider served as president of the Philadelphia Flyers from 1983 to 1994, and president of Spectacor, Inc. from 1987 to 1994. Most of his children worked for Spectacor or Comcast-Spectacor at some point during their lives.

Snider was married four times. His first marriage was to Myrna Gordon. They had four children and divorced in 1981. In 1983, he married model Martha McGeary with whom he had two children. They later divorced.

In 2004, he married Belgian Christine Decroix (born 1957), a former singer for the Belgian girl-pop group the Lovelettes in the 1970s; they divorced in 2009. He married his fourth wife, Lin Spivak (born 1968), on February 14, 2013.

Snider was a brother of the Sigma Alpha Mu fraternity.

== Death ==
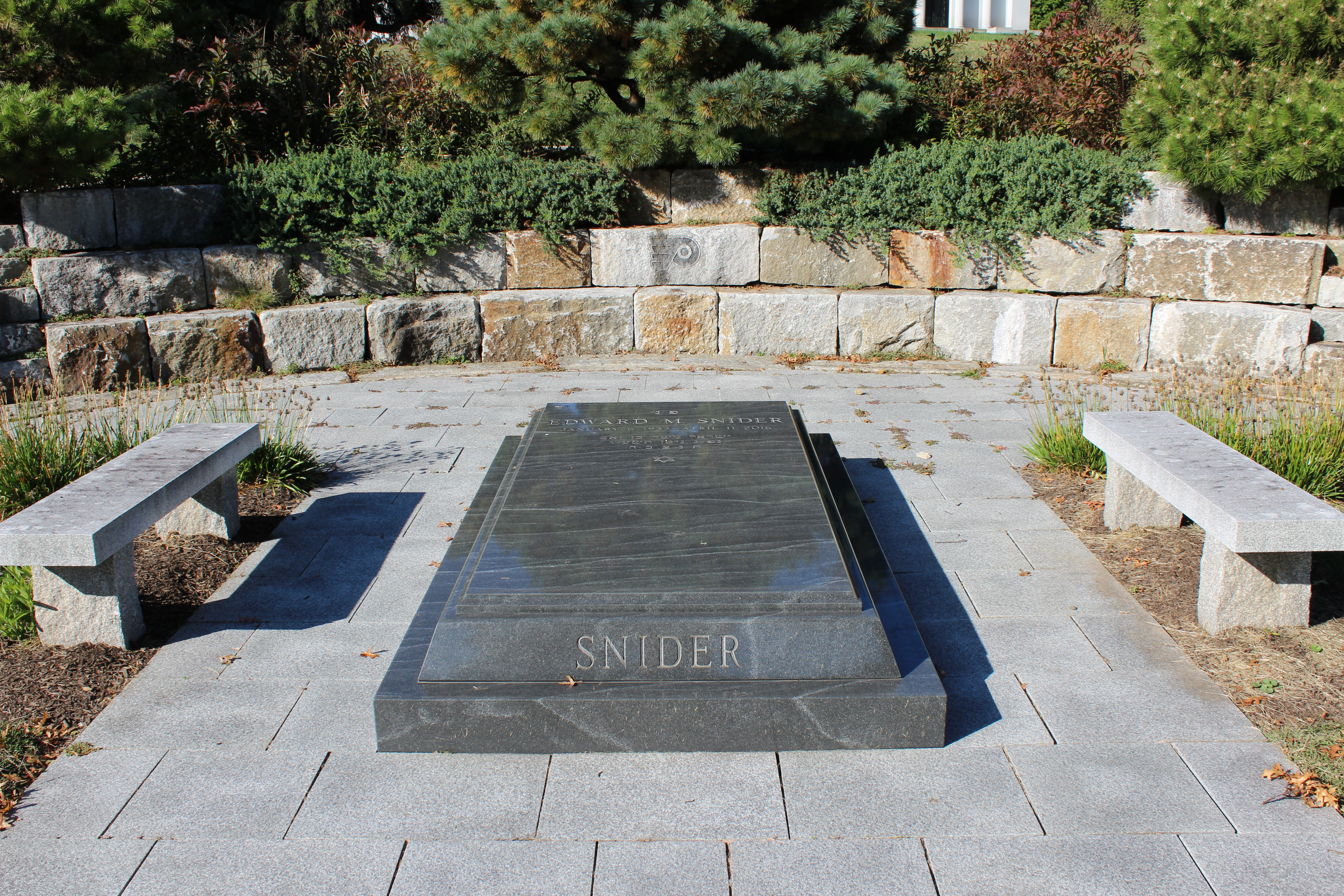
Snider's grave at West Laurel Hill Cemetery

In 2014, Snider was treated for bladder cancer. Although he announced in September 2014 that he was "cancer free", the cancer subsequently returned in 2015. After a months-long battle, Snider died on April 11, 2016, surrounded by his children at his home in Montecito, California and was interred at West Laurel Hill Cemetery in Bala Cynwyd, Pennsylvania.

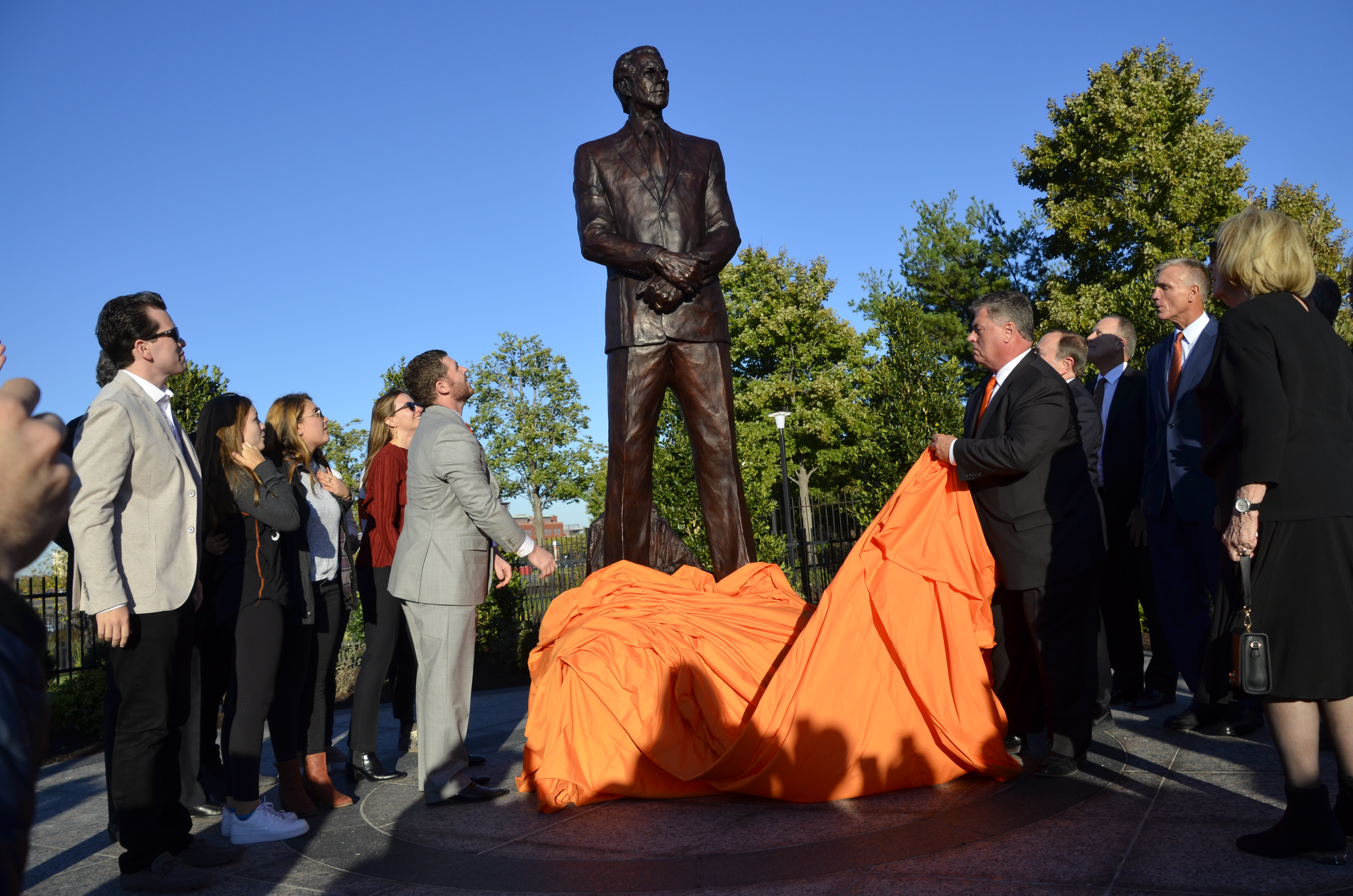
Ed Snider's statue is unveiled outside the Wells Fargo Center

The Flyers wore a patch in his memory on the right shoulder, a black circle with "EMS" in white, for their Stanley Cup Playoff series against the Washington Capitals. For the following season, they wore a patch on the same shoulder, this one having Snider's signature in a black circle, with a line and the Flyers logo under the signature.

In 2017, the Philadelphia Flyers unveiled a statue of Snider below his old office outside the Wells Fargo Center.

Sporting positions
Preceded by Harold Katz	Philadelphia 76ers owner 1996–2011	Succeeded by David Blitzer and Josh Harris
First	Philadelphia Flyers owner 1967–2016	Succeeded by Daniel J. Hilferty
