= NHL Enterprises, LP =

Marketing affiliate of the National Hockey League

The NHL Enterprises LP is the marketing affiliate of the National Hockey League (NHL), which was incorporated on June 17, 1996, in New York, New York that protects the licensing programs including trademarks and intellectual property of its thirty-two professional ice hockey franchises in the United States and Canada and offers sports merchandising.

== Overview ==
NHL Enterprises, L.P. is one of four subsidiaries of the National Hockey League. The others are NHL Enterprises Canada, L.P., NHL Europe, and NHL Productions.

NHL Enterprises LP, which was incorporated in 1996, operates as a subsidiary of the National Hockey League which currently comprises 32 member teams located throughout the United States and Canada. (Note: The Coalition to Advance the Protection of Sports logos (CAPS) is an alliance of IMG College Licensing, LLC; Major League Baseball Properties, Inc.; NBA Properties, Inc.; NFL Properties LLC; and, NHL Enterprises, L.P. CAPS was formed in 1992 to coordinate and centralized the common trademark protection and enforcement matters of its members, both civilly and criminally.)

According to the 2000 annual report of the Hockey Company, NHL Enterprises LP is the "marketing affiliate of the NHL". The Hockey Company had a license agreement with NHL Enterprises LP, since the 2000s, giving them the exclusive right to supply authentic game jerseys used "on-ice" by the 32 NHL teams, including playoff and all-star jerseys".

== Board of directors ==
The chairman of the Board is Jeremy M. Jacobs.

== Thirty Two ice hockey franchises ==
There are seven franchises in Canada including Calgary Flames (Alberta, Canada), Edmonton Oilers (Alberta, Canada), Montreal Canadiens, Ottawa Senators (Ontario, Canada), Toronto Maple Leafs, Vancouver Canucks, and Winnipeg Jets.

In the United States there are 25 franchises—Anaheim Ducks, Boston Bruins, Buffalo Sabres, Carolina Hurricanes, Chicago Blackhawks, Colorado Avalanche (Denver), Columbus Blue Jackets (Ohio), Dallas Stars, Detroit Red Wings, Florida Panthers (Miami), Los Angeles Kings, Minnesota Wild (St. Paul), Nashville Predators, New Jersey Devils (Newark), New York Islanders (Elmont), New York Rangers (New York City), Philadelphia Flyers, Utah Mammoth (Salt Lake City), Pittsburgh Penguins, St. Louis Blues, San Jose Sharks (California), Seattle Kraken, Tampa Bay Lightning, Vegas Golden Knights, and Washington Capitals (Washington, D.C.).

== See also ==
- List of NHL franchise owners
- NHL uniform
