= Philadelphia 76ers Training Complex =

Basketball training complex in Camden, New Jersey

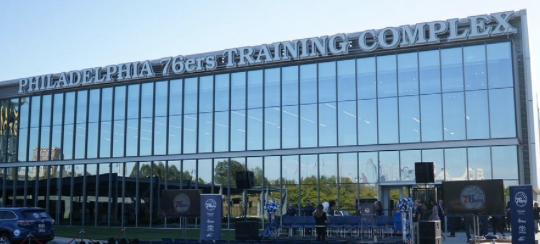
- Interactive map of Philadelphia 76ers Training Complex
- Location: Camden, New Jersey
- Coordinates: 39.9432°N 75.1272°W
- Owner: Josh Harris; David Blitzer
- Operator: Harris Blitzer Sports & Entertainment
- Type: Training facility
- Acreage: 58,770 sq ft (5,460 m^{2}) grounds 66,230 sq ft (6,153 m^{2}) building Total 125,000 sq ft (11,613 m^{2})

Construction
- Groundbreaking: 2015
- Opened: 23 September 2016
- Cost: $82 million
- Architects: Jacobs Solutions; 360 Architects
- Project manager: AthenianRazak
- Structural engineer: Jacobs Solutions
- Services engineer: Jacobs Solutions
- General contractor: Intech Construction

Tenant
- Philadelphia 76ers (NBA) 2016–present

The Philadelphia 76ers Training Complex is a 125,000-square-foot athletic facility and office building in Camden, New Jersey, which houses the training center and corporate offices of the Philadelphia 76ers of the National Basketball Association. It opened in September 2016 and is owned by 76ers managing entity Harris Blitzer Sports & Entertainment. Vocal opponents of the facility claim that the site has now joined a list of large companies or industries that are invited to Camden with significant monetary incentive, at great expense to local tax payers as a form of corporate welfare.

== History ==
Prior to its opening in September 2016, the team practiced at the Philadelphia College of Osteopathic Medicine in Wynnefield Heights neighborhood of Philadelphia, while business-side operations were located at the Navy Yard in South Philadelphia.

Although the project was poised to be located at the Philadelphia Naval Yard, developer AthenianRazak, who was managing the project, brought the possibility of locating in Camden to the team, citing the newly enacted Grow NJ tax credit program. The team had also deliberated building on the local Camden Navy Yard, including receiving architect mock-ups of a 55,000 square foot facility for an estimated $20–25 million, but these plans didn't come to fruition. As a result, the team found a property at the Camden Waterfront and started construction in 2015. The facility had a $82 million tax credit approved by the New Jersey Economic Development Authority.

=== Controversy ===
The training facility was pitched as a project that would support the revitalization of Camden, a city with a 39.5% poverty rate, by creating jobs for local residents and improving the surrounding areas of the facility. Yet in 2023, it was reported that of the facility's 275 employees, only 11 were Camden residents.

The complex was built right next to the Mickle Towers, a housing project with low-income residents. To this day the area remains destitute with many abandoned buildings and little infrastructure for residents, despite the 76ers’ promise to revitalize the immediate area of the complex. A resident of Mickle Towers told Metro Philadelphia: “We don’t get nothing from them [the Sixers] being here. … They could at least clean up the trash on the street near us and help out with all that money they saved moving here.”

The complex was constructed with $82 million in tax breaks from New Jersey's Economic Development Authority and the Grow NJ program.

== Features ==
The complex has two regulation NBA courts with 12 baskets. The courts are available for players and coaches use at any time. Also the building has it own players restaurant with its own full menu, along a private balcony and film and press room. A 2,800-square-foot player locker room, and state-of-the-art performance, wellness, recovery, and hydrotherapy room with recovery pool, a fully operational gym, rehab center, and players and coaches film and conference rooms. While the 76ers used to share their practice facilities with the Philadelphia College of Osteopathic Medicine, they now claim one of the largest and most advanced facilities in the NBA.

=== Notable features ===
- 2 basketball courts with 10 baskets
- Restaurant and cafeteria
- 9,000 gallon swimming pool
- 2 hot tubs
- 2,800-square-foot players locker room
- 6,000-square-foot weight and training center
- 5 meeting rooms
- 3,000-square-foot film room with 25 movie chairs
- Over 100,000-square-feet of office space
- 9,000-square-foot media and player/coaching interview room
- Recording studio
