= New South Philadelphia Arena =

Planned arena in Pennsylvania, U.S.

- Concept render of the Arena and the Fan Plaza.
- Location: Philadelphia, Pennsylvania, U.S.
- Owner: Harris Blitzer Sports & Entertainment (HBSE); Comcast Spectacor

Construction
- Opened: May 2030 (planned)

Tenants
- Philadelphia 76ers (NBA) (beginning 2030); Philadelphia Flyers (NHL) (beginning 2030); Philadelphia WNBA team (WNBA) (beginning 2030)

The New South Philadelphia Arena is a planned multi-purpose indoor arena in Philadelphia, Pennsylvania, that will serve as the home of the Philadelphia 76ers of the National Basketball Association (NBA), the Philadelphia Flyers of the National Hockey League (NHL), and an expansion team of the Women's National Basketball Association (WNBA). Scheduled to open in 2030, the arena will serve as a replacement for Xfinity Mobile Arena, the current home arena for the 76ers and Flyers.

The new arena was announced in January 2025 when the 76ers, who had originally planned to build 76 Place at Market East in Center City, cancelled their plans and partnered with the Flyers to build a new arena to be shared by the two teams inside the existing South Philadelphia Sports Complex. Ownership of the arena will be shared between Harris Blitzer Sports & Entertainment (HBSE), owning entity of the 76ers, and Comcast Spectacor, owning entity of the Flyers.

== Background and development ==
In 2022, the Philadelphia 76ers unveiled plans to construct a new arena in Center City, Philadelphia, under the working name "76 Place at Market East". Under the plan, Harris Blitzer Sports & Entertainment (HBSE) would purchase multiple buildings in the area surrounding the arena site, including the Fashion District Philadelphia shopping mall. The buildings were planned to be demolished to make way for the new arena and other entertainment locations. The arena proposal faced significant opposition, especially among residents and proprietors of nearby Chinatown, who feared the new arena would negatively affect the neighborhood economically. Despite opposition, the Philadelphia City Council approved the arena proposal in December 2024.

Despite gaining approval from the city council, plans for 76 Place were dropped after HBSE and Comcast Spectacor announced a deal on January 13, 2025, to build a new arena in the present South Philadelphia Sports Complex instead, with the two ownership groups owning the new arena in a 50-50 joint venture. Additionally, the arena will be constructed with the intent of hosting a Women's National Basketball Association (WNBA) expansion franchise for Philadelphia.

On June 30, 2025, the WNBA officially announced it had awarded a new franchise to Philadelphia, which will join the league in the 2030 season. Harris expressed hope that the arena would be completed by 2030; if not, the team will play at Xfinity Mobile Arena for its inaugural season. Comcast Spectacor will own the naming rights to the new arena.

On April 17, 2026, the planned site for the arena was announced to be around the location of the former Spectrum.

On September 8, 2026, the first official renderings were released alongside a new website. Developers are targeting a groundbreaking in 2027, with the arena planned to open by May 2030.
