= General manager (basketball) =

Type of sports manager

In basketball leagues such as the NBA and WNBA, the general manager (GM) of a team typically handles player transactions, manages contract negotiations, and has the power to hire and dismiss a head coach, as well as their coaching staff. They also decide which players to draft in the NBA draft.

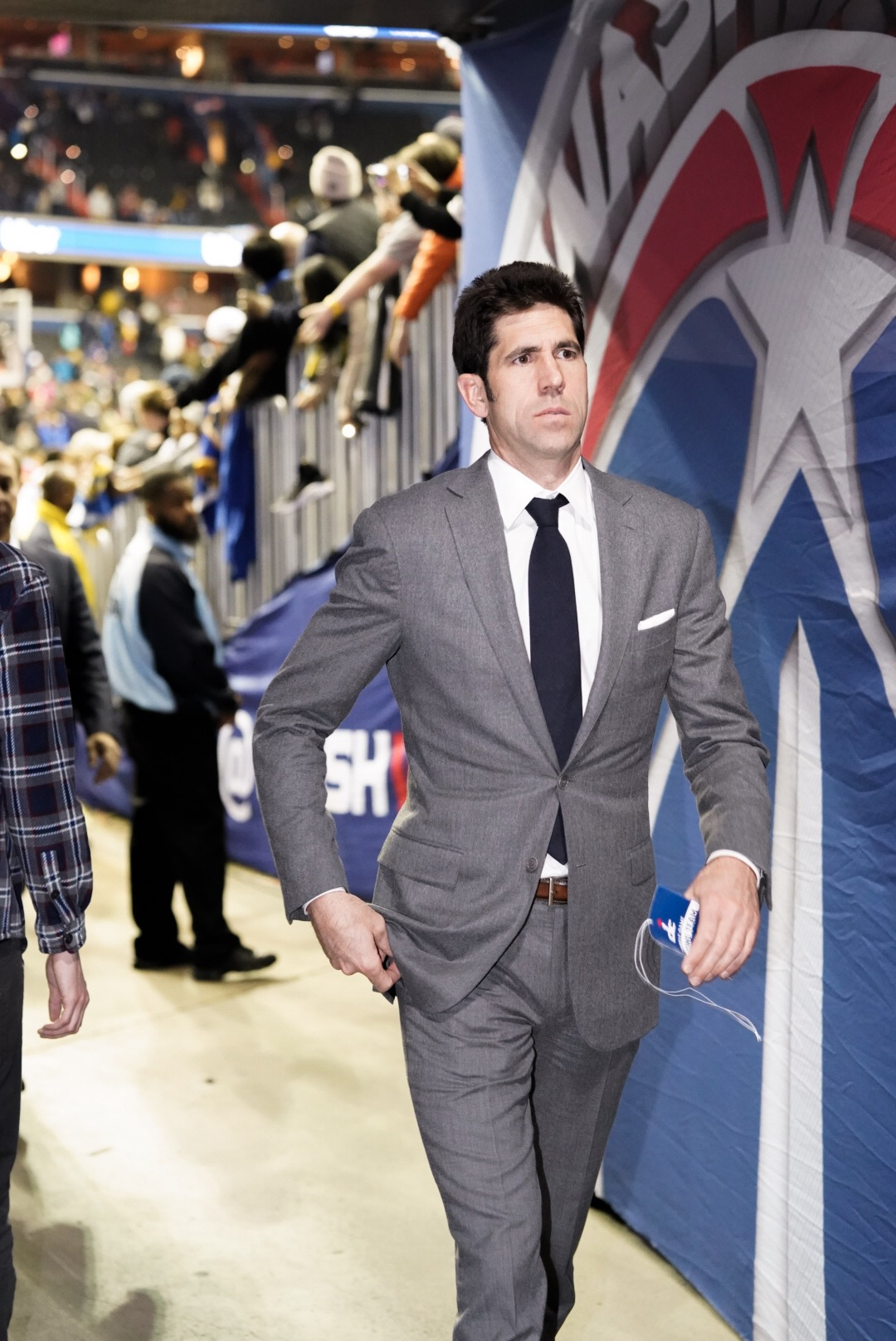
Bob Myers, former general manager of the Golden State Warriors.

The exact title and responsibilities held by a general manager can vary from team to team. Some teams choose to have both a general manager and a President of Basketball Operations. For example, when Red Auerbach was team president of the Boston Celtics in the 1980s, Jan Volk, the team's GM from 1984 to 1997, reported to Auerbach regarding basketball-related decisions. Others, such as the Minnesota Lynx of the WNBA, have a general manager who is also Chief Executive Officer of the organization, effectively reporting only to the owner.

In some cases, teams have made active head coaches their team's general manager while still retaining head coaching duties. For example, when Don Nelson became coach of the Milwaukee Bucks in 1976, he also acted as the general manager.

== Role and responsibilities ==
The role of a general manager is often pivotal in constructing a team's roster, culture, and identity. In addition to their role in directly overseeing the trading, signing, and drafting of players, general managers are often tasked with more intangible duties, including networking with other executives in the league and building relationships with players and the agencies that represent them. The importance of these aspects of a GM's career has led some notable executives to begin their careers working as or with sports agents, including Rob Pelinka and Bob Myers.

Acting as a spokesperson and representative of the team to the press is also an important part of many GM's jobs. They may answer questions or give interviews with the media in order to discuss decisions related to trading players and contract negotiations.

General managers are also charged with overseeing the construction of their team's coaching staff, often in collaboration with the head coach, who reports to the GM either directly or down the chain of command of executives. They pursue and interview potentially available coaches who hold coaching positions on other teams in the NBA and college basketball, as well as assistant coaches on their own team who may have potential as a head coach. Some general managers attempt to exert more control over their team than others. This has historically led to some notable clashes and power struggles between general managers and head coaches over the direction and construction of their team. This is especially true of the well-documented, turbulent relationship between Chicago Bulls GM Jerry Krause and head coach Phil Jackson, which was given significant attention in the popular miniseries The Last Dance.

The general manager reports to the team's governor and ownership team. They work with and as a part of the front office to make decisions regarding the team's willingness and ability to exceed the NBA salary cap and enter the luxury tax as well as other matters related to the distribution of the team's finances.

== See also ==
- NBA Executive of the Year Award
- Sports Illustrated Best GM of the Decade (2009)
- List of NBA general managers
