= Delaware Blue Coats =

American professional basketball team of the NBA G League

- Conference: Eastern
- League: NBA G League
- Founded: 2007
- History: Utah Flash; 2007–2011; Delaware 87ers 2013–2018; Delaware Blue Coats; 2018–present
- Arena: Chase Fieldhouse
- Location: Wilmington, Delaware
- Team colors: Blue, red, cream, navy blue, white
- General manager: Jameer Nelson
- Head coach: JP Clark
- Ownership: Harris Blitzer Sports & Entertainment; (Josh Harris and David Blitzer)
- Affiliation: Philadelphia 76ers
- Championships: 1 (2023)
- Conference titles: 2 (2022, 2023)
- Division titles: 1 (2009)
- Showcase Cup titles: 1 (2021)
- Website: bluecoats.gleague.nba.com

The Delaware Blue Coats are an American professional basketball team in the NBA G League based in Wilmington, Delaware. They are affiliated with the Philadelphia 76ers, and play their home games at Chase Fieldhouse. The Blue Coats are owned by Josh Harris and David Blitzer under Harris Blitzer Sports & Entertainment (HBSE), who also own the 76ers.

The team was founded in 2007 as the Utah Flash and served as an affiliate to the Utah Jazz. In April 2013, the 76ers acquired the team and relocated it to Newark, Delaware, where it played as the Delaware 87ers (nicknamed the Sevens) until 2018. The team then moved to Wilmington and were rebranded as the Delaware Blue Coats. The team won the 2022–23 G League championship.

== History ==
=== Utah Flash ===
In 2004, Utah entrepreneur Brandt Andersen heard the NBA was expanding operations to include a development league. Eventually Andersen got a new team to start play in 2007, based in Orem, Utah, playing at the McKay Events Center.

The Flash nickname was chosen by a name-the-team contest, in which over 21,000 votes were cast. The team was established with a close help from its NBA affiliate Utah Jazz, who indicated to the general manager job David Fredman – who was an assistant coach and director of scouting for the Jazz for 28 years, and also the assistant general manager for the Denver Nuggets – and as a coach Brad Jones, a regional scout who was the nephew of long time Jazz coach Jerry Sloan. Also as an NBA affiliate were the Boston Celtics. In the first season for the Flash on December 21, 2007, guard Morris Almond (who had been sent down to the D league by the Jazz) tied an NBA Development League record with 51 points in a 118–116 victory over the Austin Toros later in that season Almond broke the record with a 53-point performance in the 102–87 blowout win against the Bakersfield Jam, Almond also led the league in scoring averaging 25.6 points a game. In July 2008, Fredman was called back by the Jazz to work as a scout, and coach Jones ended up pulling double duty as general manager as well. In 2009, the Celtics changed affiliations to the new team Maine Red Claws, leading the Atlanta Hawks to join forces with the Flash.

On December 8, 2009, the Flash hosted a sold-out crowd that hoped Michael Jordan was going to appear to play in a charity exhibition at halftime against former Utah Jazz guard Bryon Russell. However, Jordan did not appear, and a Jordan lookalike was introduced in what turned out to be a hoax. Brad Jones retired as head coach of the Utah Flash on September 7, 2010, and Kevin Young was named as his replacement. Young had been the assistant coach for the Flash for the prior two years, as well as scout and director of basketball operations, and before joining the organization worked at the Utah Valley University team.

The team suspended operations following the 2011 season, as Andersen was forced to sell his interest in the Flash. Despite high ticket sales, being second in NBADL attendance during the 2010–2011 season, drawing more than 100,000 fans and averaging 4,237 per game, the Flash had frequent financial struggles, as both the Jazz and the city's minor league baseball team Orem Owlz made it difficult to get sponsorship deals.

=== Delaware 87ers ===
On April 27, 2013, after two years of hiatus, the Philadelphia 76ers acquired the team, and renamed it the Delaware 87ers. The nickname, a play on the 76ers' own, was inspired by the fact that Delaware was the first state to ratify the United States Constitution in 1787. The team played its games at the University of Delaware campus. Former Ripken Baseball Inc. assistant vice president of sales/marketing Aaron Moszer was named team president.

In September 2013, Brandon Williams was named the team's first general manager. Rod Baker was named the team's head coach for their inaugural season in Delaware.

The 87ers finished their first season with a 12–38 record. Two players received a Gatorade Call-Up during the 2013–14 season – Kendall Marshall was called up by the Los Angeles Lakers on December 20, 2013, and Vander Blue was called up by the Boston Celtics on January 22, 2014 Thanasis Antetokounmpo was selected with the 51st overall pick in the 2014 NBA draft by the New York Knicks – the first 87er to be drafted into the NBA.

Over the summer, the 87ers introduced their mascot, Caesar, on August 22, 2014. Caesar was a fox, the state animal of Delaware, and is named after Caesar Rodney who served on the Continental Congress as a representative from Delaware during the American Revolution.

Ahead of the 2014–15 season, Baker was called up by the Sixers to serve as a scout in the front office. Hired as his replacement was Kevin Young, who led the team to an improved 20–30 record, and the Sevens ranked No. 7 in the D-League in points per game. On April 10, 2015, the 87ers earned the Merit Award for Emerging Business of the Year, and also received the Voter's Choice Award for Community Involvement at the Delaware Small Business Chamber's Blue Ribbon Awards Ceremony.

The 87ers improved upon their offensive play from the previous season, with four different players scoring at least 45 points in a game in 2015–16 (a D-League record). Sean Kilpatrick scored 45 points, Jordan McRae set the all-time D-League single-game scoring record with 61 points, Christian Wood scored 45 points, and Russ Smith broke McRae's record and scored 65 points. McRae and Kilpatrick were selected as All-Stars, and both along with Wood received NBA call-ups. With three of their top four players now in the NBA, the 87ers went through a rough stretch from a 17–13 start to finish 21–29. They were however aided by former NBA All-Star Baron Davis, who played six games with the team to conclude the season.

=== Delaware Blue Coats ===
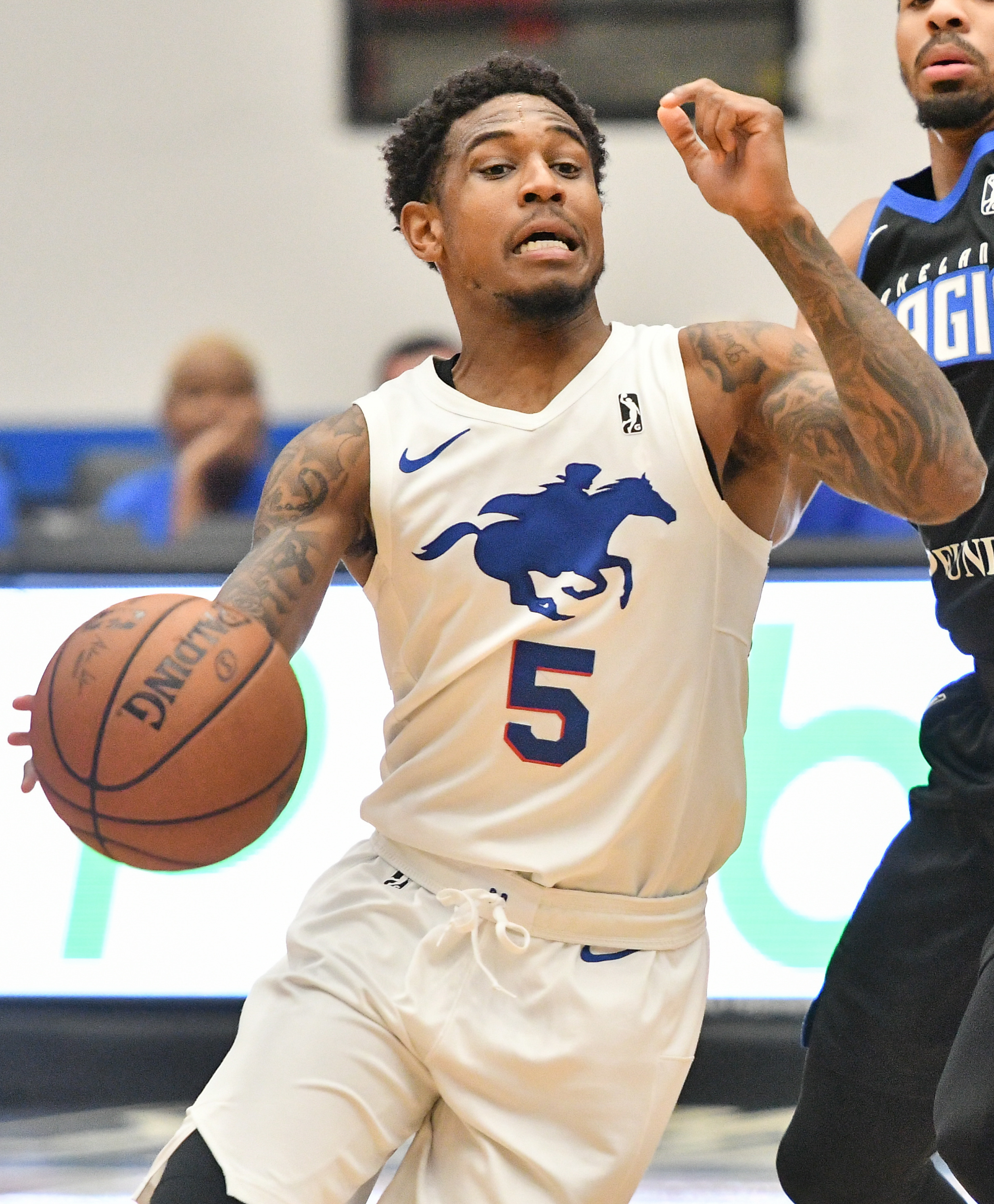
Xavier Munford playing for the Blue Coats

Beginning with the 2018–19 season, the team was renamed the Delaware Blue Coats, an homage to the 1st Delaware Regiment, also known as the "Delaware Blues," and their key role in the American Revolution. The team logo pays homage to Caesar Rodney (the namesake for the aforementioned mascot) and his 70-mile ride from Dover to Philadelphia on July 1–2, 1776, to cast Delaware's tie-breaking vote in favor of what would become the Declaration of Independence. The rebrand coincided with the opening of the new Chase Fieldhouse in Wilmington. On September 20, 2018, general manager Elton Brand was promoted to general manager of the Philadelphia 76ers.

In the 2020–21 NBA G League season, the Blue Coats advanced to the championship before losing to Lakeland Magic. The following offseason led to general manager Matt Lilly being let go by the team and coach Connor Johnson resigning to look at other opportunities. Sixers vice president of player personnel, Prosper Karangwa, was given the duties of general manager while former South Bay Lakers' head coach Coby Karl was named head coach.

The 2022–23 season saw the Blue Coats return to the NBA G League Finals after a victory over Long Island. They became the first team since the Santa Cruz Warriors to reach the Finals in three straight seasons. On April 6, 2023, the Blue Coats clinched their first NBA G League championship in franchise history, avenging their finals loss to the Rio Grande Valley Vipers in the finals the previous year, defeating them 2 games to 0.

== Season-by-season ==
| Season | Division | Regular season | | | | Playoffs |
| Season | Division | Finish | Wins | Losses | Pct. | Playoffs |
|---|---|---|---|---|---|---|
Utah Flash
| 2007–08 | Western | 3rd | 24 | 26 | .480 | |
| 2008–09 | Western | 1st | 32 | 18 | .640 | Won First Round (Bakersfield) 94–81; Won Semifinals (Dakota) 103–93; Lost D-League Finals (Colorado) 0–2 |
| 2009–10 | Western | 4th | 28 | 22 | .560 | Lost First Round (Iowa) 1–2 |
| 2010–11 | Western | 5th | 28 | 22 | .560 | Lost First Round (Iowa) 1–2 |
Delaware 87ers
| 2013–14 | Eastern | 6th | 12 | 38 | .240 | |
| 2014–15 | Atlantic | 4th | 20 | 30 | .400 | |
| 2015–16 | Atlantic | 4th | 21 | 29 | .420 | |
| 2016–17 | Atlantic | 2nd | 26 | 24 | .520 | |
| 2017–18 | Southeast | 4th | 16 | 34 | .320 | |
Delaware Blue Coats
| 2018–19 | Atlantic | 4th | 21 | 29 | .420 | |
| 2019–20 | Atlantic | 2nd | 22 | 21 | .512 | Season cancelled by COVID-19 pandemic |
| 2020–21 | — | 4th | 10 | 5 | .667 | Won Quarterfinal (Austin) 124–103; Won Semifinal (Raptors 905) 127–100; Lost Championship (Lakeland) 78–97 |
| 2021–22 | Eastern | 3rd | 22 | 10 | .688 | Won Quarterfinal (Long Island) 133–116; Won Semifinal (Motor City) 124–116; Won Conference Final (Raptors 905) 143–139; Lost G League Finals (Rio Grande Valley) 0–2 |
| 2022–23 | Eastern | 2nd | 20 | 12 | .625 | Won Semifinal (Capital City) 104–99; Won Conference Finals (Long Island) 108–94; Won G League Finals (Rio Grande Valley) 2–0 |
| 2023–24 | Eastern | 6th | 19 | 15 | .559 | Won Conference Quarterfinal (Indiana) 123–101; Lost Conference Semifinal (Maine) 112–119 |
| 2024–25 | Eastern | 13th | 14 | 20 | .412 | |
| Regular season record | | | 315 | 343 | .479 | 2007–present |
| Playoff record | | | 14 | 10 | .583 | 2007–present |

== Current roster ==
Delaware Blue Coats roster
Players

| Pos. | No. | Player | Height | Weight | DOB | From |
|---|---|---|---|---|---|---|
| F | 7 | Marcus Bagley | 6 ft 6 in (1.98 m) | 217 lb (98 kg) | 2001-10-23 | Arizona State |
| C | 77 | Drew Cisse | 6 ft 11 in (2.11 m) | 210 lb (95 kg) | 2001-01-10 | Western Illinois |
| G | – | Caleb Love (TW) | 6 ft 3 in (1.91 m) | 212 lb (96 kg) | 2001-09-27 | Arizona |
| F | 44 | Igor Miličić Jr. | 6 ft 10 in (2.08 m) | 225 lb (102 kg) | 2002-08-27 | Tennessee |
| G | 24 | Aminu Mohammed | 6 ft 5 in (1.96 m) | 210 lb (95 kg) | 2001-12-15 | Georgetown |
| C | 34 | Abou Ousmane | 6 ft 9 in (2.06 m) | 255 lb (116 kg) | 2001-04-07 | Oklahoma State |
| G/F | – | Rayan Rupert (TW) | 6 ft 7 in (2.01 m) | 205 lb (93 kg) | 2004-05-21 | France |
| F | 12 | DeAndre Williams | 6 ft 9 in (2.06 m) | 205 lb (93 kg) | 1996-10-04 | Memphis |

Coaches
Head coach
- JP Clark
Assistant(s)
- Ryan Ayers
- Micah Fraction
- Reggie Redding

Legend
- (DP) Unsigned draft pick
- (FA) Free agent
- (S) Suspended
- (P) Prospects
- (NBA) On assignment from NBA affiliate
- (TW) Two-way affiliate player
- Injured

Roster
Updated: April 2, 2026

== Head coaches ==
| # | Head coach | Term | Regular season | | | | Playoffs | | | | Achievements |
| # | Head coach | Term | G | W | L | Win% | G | W | L | Win% | Achievements |
|---|---|---|---|---|---|---|---|---|---|---|---|
| 1 | Brad Jones | 2007–2010 | 150 | 84 | 66 | .560 | 6 | 3 | 3 | .500 | |
| 2 | Kevin Young | 2010–2011 | 50 | 28 | 22 | .560 | 3 | 1 | 2 | .333 | |
| 3 | Rod Baker | 2013–2014 | 50 | 12 | 38 | .240 | — | — | — | — | |
| 4 | Kevin Young | 2014–2016 | 100 | 41 | 49 | .410 | — | — | — | — | |
| 5 | Eugene Burroughs | 2016–2018 | 100 | 42 | 58 | .420 | — | — | — | — | |
| 6 | Connor Johnson | 2018–2021 | 108 | 53 | 55 | .491 | 3 | 2 | 1 | .667 | |
| 7 | Coby Karl | 2021–2023 | 64 | 42 | 22 | .656 | 9 | 7 | 2 | .778 | |
| 8 | Mike Longabardi | 2023–2025 | 68 | 33 | 35 | .485 | 2 | 1 | 1 | .500 | |
| 9 | JP Clark | 2025–present | 68 | 33 | 35 | .485 | 2 | 1 | 1 | .500 | |

== NBA affiliates ==
=== Utah Flash ===
- Atlanta Hawks (2009–2011)
- Boston Celtics (2007–2009)
- Utah Jazz (2007–2011)

=== Delaware 87ers/Blue Coats ===
- Philadelphia 76ers (2013–present)
