= Harris Blitzer Sports & Entertainment =

American sports and venue management company

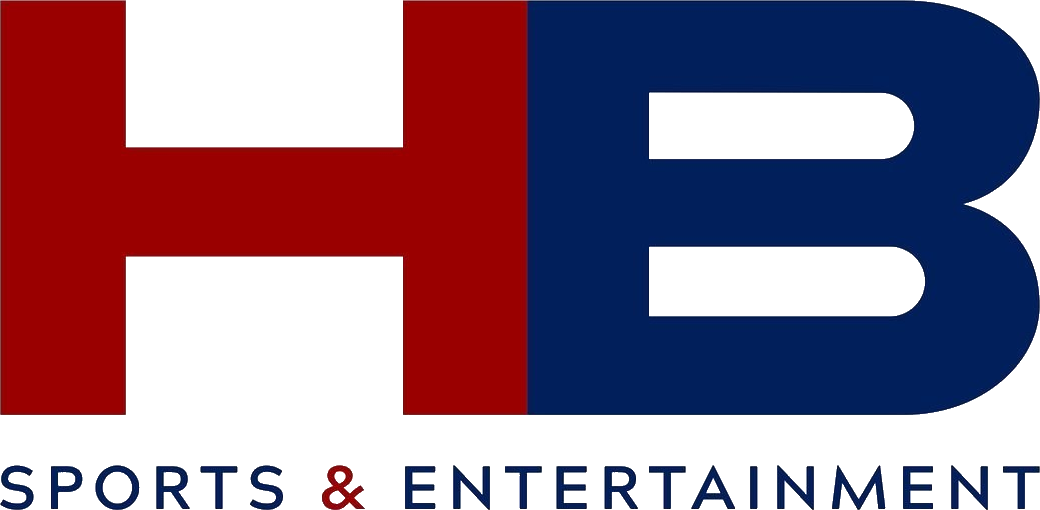
- Type: Private
- Industry: Sports and venue management
- Founded: September 25, 2017; 9 years ago
- Founders: Josh Harris; David Blitzer
- Headquarters: Camden, New Jersey, U.S.
- Key people: Tad Brown (CEO); Bob Myers (President)
- Brands: Philadelphia 76ers (NBA); New Jersey Devils (NHL); Philadelphia WNBA team (WNBA)
- Total assets: $14.6 billion (July 2025)
- Subsidiaries: HBSE Ventures; HBSE Real Estate; Devils Arena Entertainment
- Website: www.hbse.com

Harris Blitzer Sports & Entertainment (HBSE) is an American sports and venue management company founded by Josh Harris and David Blitzer in September 2017. HBSE owns and operates the Philadelphia 76ers of the National Basketball Association (NBA) and the New Jersey Devils of the National Hockey League (NHL), along with their minor league affiliates, as well as a future Philadelphia WNBA team. HBSE also operates venues, such as the Prudential Center and Northwest Stadium, and holds a minority stake in the NASCAR team Joe Gibbs Racing. The company is headquartered in Camden, New Jersey, and had $14.6 billion in assets as of 2025.

== History ==
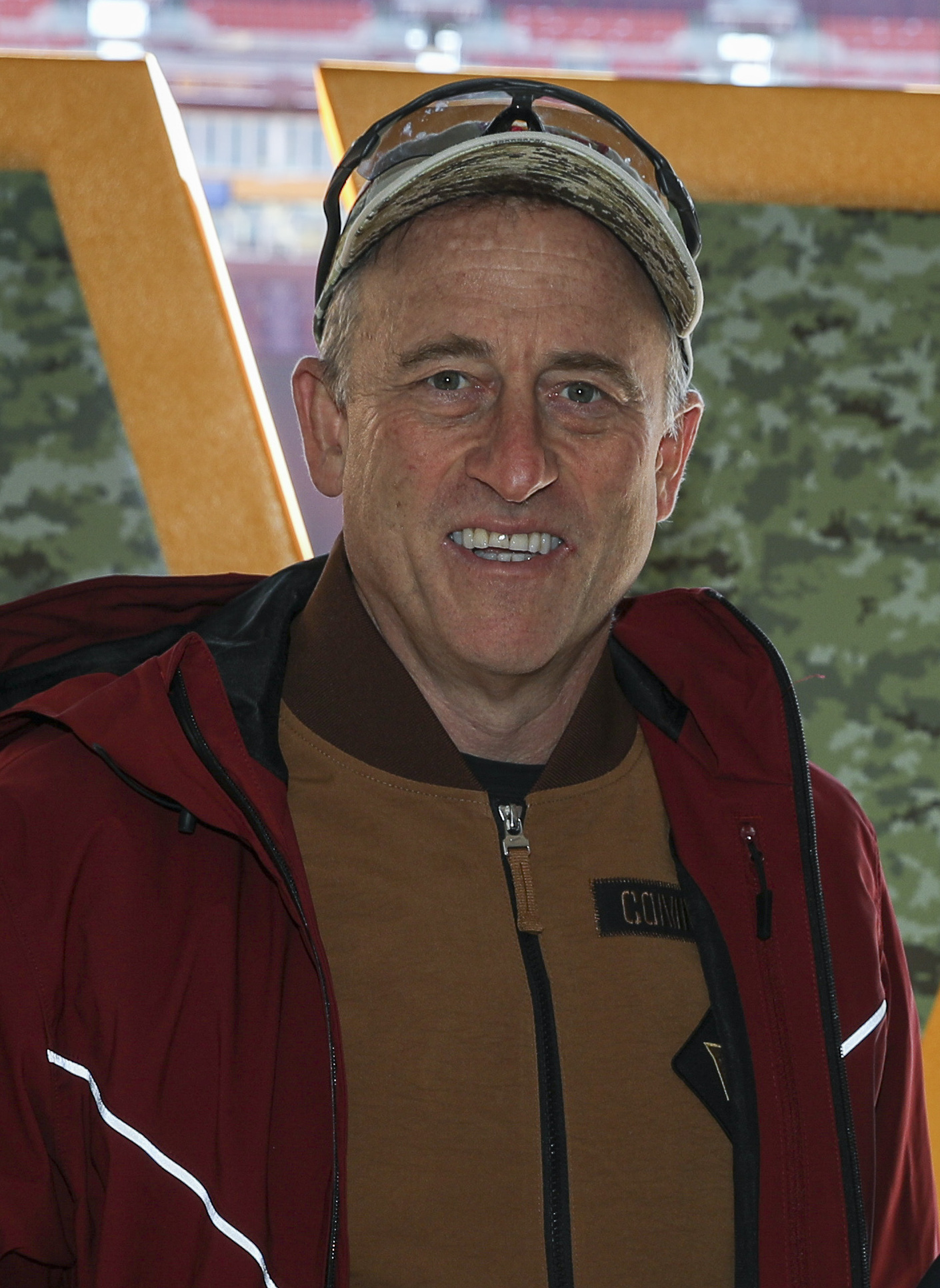
HBSE was founded in 2017 by Josh Harris (pictured) and David Blitzer.

Harris Blitzer Sports & Entertainment (HBSE) was founded by Apollo Global Management co-founder Josh Harris and senior Blackstone executive David Blitzer on September 25, 2017. The pair previously led groups that bought the Philadelphia 76ers of the National Basketball Association in 2011 and the New Jersey Devils of the National Hockey League and operating rights to Prudential Center in 2013. In 2016, the pair bought the esports organization Dignitas. In 2018, HBSE partnered with the San Francisco 49ers and Creative Artists Agency to establish Elevate Sports Venture, a consulting firm specializing on event marketing and ticketing.

In 2019, the company bought the esports organization Clutch Gaming for $30 million and merged them with Dignitas, forming a parent company, New Meta Entertainment, with investments from Fertitta Entertainment, Delaware North, and Steve Rifkind. HBSE assisted in the development of the Chase Fieldhouse, an arena and sports complex in Wilmington, Delaware, which opened as the 76ers Fieldhouse in 2019. In 2020, HBSE donated millions of dollars to local communities in Philadelphia and Newark in response to the COVID-19 pandemic. The same year, the company pledged $20 million to fight racial injustice. HBSE hired Tad Brown, former CEO of the Houston Rockets, for the same role in August 2021.

In 2022, president Hugh Weber left the company to explore other ventures. The same year, HBSE limited partner (LP) and Fanatics CEO Michael Rubin sold his 10% stake to David Adelman to avoid a conflict of interest regarding Fanatics' growing business. The company pursued bids of the New York Mets and the Chelsea Football Club in the early 2020s before they were sold to other parties. HBSE bought a minority stake in Joe Gibbs Racing (JGR) in 2023, with founder Joe Gibbs becoming a LP of the company as part of the partnership. HBSE was valued by CNBC at $14.6 billion in July 2025. The same year the company began managing non-NFL events at Northwest Stadium, home stadium of the NFL team Washington Commanders, which was acquired by Harris in 2023. HBSE had plans to build a new arena for the 76ers, 76 Place at Market East, which was set to open by 2031. They abandoned those plans in January 2025 and announced a partnership with Comcast Spectacor to build a new arena adjacent to the 76ers' current site on the South Philadelphia Sports Complex. In June 2025, HBSE was awarded a bid for a Philadelphia WNBA team to begin play in 2030. In October 2025, former Golden State Warriors general manager Bob Myers was named company president. He had previously been working under Harris as an advisor with the Commanders since January 2024.

== Brands and properties ==
Teams
Team	League	Since	Notes
Philadelphia 76ers	National Basketball Association (NBA)	2011	Includes the Philadelphia 76ers Training Complex, the Delaware Blue Coats of the NBA G League, the Sixers Youth Foundation charity organization, the 76ers Gaming Club NBA 2K League team, and the Sixers Innovation Lab startup accelerator.
New Jersey Devils	National Hockey Association (NHL)	2013	Includes the Utica Comets of the American Hockey League (AHL) and the Devils Youth Foundation charity organization. Formerly owned the Albany and Binghamton Devils AHL teams before they folded into the Comets in 2021.
Joe Gibbs Racing	NASCAR	2023	Minority investment partner with Arctos Partners
Philadelphia WNBA team	Women's National Basketball Association (WNBA)	2025	To begin play in 2030. Name to be chosen at a later date.

Organizations
Name	Type	Since	Notes
HBSE Real Estate	Sports real estate	2017	
New Meta Entertainment	Esports	2019	Parent company of Dignitas; investment partner
HBSE Ventures	Sports investment firm	2020	
Elevate Sports Ventures	Consulting firm	2020	Investment partner

Venues
Name	Location	Since	Notes
Prudential Center	Newark, New Jersey	2013	Home arena of the Devils and event venue; owned by the Newark Housing Authority and operated by subsidiary Devils Arena Entertainment. Included the former Grammy Museum Experience.
Loew's Jersey Theatre	Jersey City, New Jersey	2021	Event venue; operated by Devils Arena Entertainment
White Eagle Hall	Jersey City, New Jersey	2021	Event venue; operated by Devils Arena Entertainment
Wollman Rink	New York, New York	2021	Public ice rink in Central Park; co-operators with The Related Companies and Equinox Group
Northwest Stadium	Landover, Maryland	2023	Home stadium of the Harris-owned Washington Commanders; non-NFL event operators
New South Philadelphia Arena	Philadelphia, Pennsylvania	2031 (planned)	Future home arena of the 76ers, the NHL's Philadelphia Flyers, and the WNBA Philadelphia team; co-operator with Comcast Spectacor
