= Daniel J. Hilferty =

American business executive (born 1956)

Daniel J. Hilferty. ( Born September 14th 1955) is an American business executive currently serving as chairman and chief executive officer of Comcast Spectacor and governor of the Philadelphia Flyers. He previously held the role of chief executive officer of Independence Blue Cross from 2010 to 2020.

== Career ==
Hilferty grew up in Ocean City, New Jersey, and graduated in 1974 from St. Augustine Preparatory School. Hilferty earned a Bachelor of Science in Accounting from Saint Joseph's University in 1978. He earned a Master of Public Administration degree from American University. Hilferty had received an offer of a $22,000-a-year position at Electronic Data Systems after completing his graduate degree in 1981, but turned it down in favor of a spot at Misericordia Hospital.

Hilferty worked with the Jesuit Volunteer Corps Northwest in a volunteer program improving city playgrounds in Portland, Oregon and came to the realization that he "was a pretty good leader" based on his ability to accomplish his goals by managing his resources and connecting with government officials.

From 1987 to 1990, Hilferty was the assistant vice president overseeing community and media relations for Saint Joseph's University. From 1990 to 1992, Hilferty was the executive director of PennPorts in the administration of Governor of Pennsylvania Robert P. Casey, where he oversaw development aspects of the commonwealth's ports in Erie, Philadelphia and Pittsburgh. In 1994, Hilferty ran unsuccessfully as one of 8 candidates seeking the Democratic Party nomination as Lieutenant Governor of Pennsylvania.

In a 2013 interview, Hilferty said that he would have delayed implementation of the Patient Protection and Affordable Care Act by a year to allow better coordination between stakeholders that would allow for a better result. He also advocated for broader expansion of Medicaid in all states and suggested that appropriate penalties were needed to ensure that all individuals had health insurance that would be available to them at a wide range of price points and coverage.

In February 2023, Hilferty was named as CEO of Comcast Spectacor. On July 1, 2023, Hilferty succeeded Dave Scott as the Governor of the Philadelphia Flyers.

Prior to joining Comcast Spectacor, Hilferty led Philadelphia's successful bid to be a host city for the FIFA World Cup 2026.

Prior to 2010, he was president and chief executive officer of AmeriHealth Caritas, formerly known as the AmeriHealth Mercy Family of Cos.

== Personal ==
He lives with his wife in Ardmore, Pennsylvania and maintains a summer home on the Jersey Shore in Ocean City, where he grew up. Hilferty has five children.

Business positions
Preceded by Ed Snider	Comcast Spectacor, Chairman/CEO; 2016–present	Incumbent
Sporting positions
Preceded by Ed Snider	Philadelphia Flyers owner 2016–present	Incumbent
