= Tad Brown =

American sports executive

CEO of Harris Blitzer Sports & Entertainment
- Incumbent
- Assumed office August 2021
- Preceded by: Scott O'Neil

CEO of the Houston Rockets and Toyota Center
- In office October 2006 – April 2021

Personal details
- Education: Colgate University

Thaddeus Brown is an American sports executive who is the chief executive officer (CEO) of Harris Blitzer Sports & Entertainment, which includes the Philadelphia 76ers of the National Basketball Association (NBA) and the New Jersey Devils of the National Hockey League (NHL). He was CEO of the NBA's Houston Rockets and the Toyota Center. Brown is a graduate of Colgate University.

== Career ==
=== Houston Rockets and Toyota Center ===
Brown joined the Houston Rockets as their Vice President of Corporate Development in 2002 before being named CEO in October 2006, a role which also covered the Toyota Center. The Toyota Center hosted the 2006 and 2013 NBA All-Star Games. He played a role in signing James Harden in 2012 and keeping him from free agency in 2017. Brown was also responsible for trading for Chris Paul in 2017 before trading him for Russell Westbrook in 2019. During the COVID-19 pandemic, Brown was actively involved in the organization's efforts to support front line workers and the local community. Brown stepped down as CEO in April 2021.

=== Harris Blitzer Sports & Entertainment ===
Brown began work as CEO of Harris Blitzer Sports & Entertainment (HBSE) on August 3, 2021. The role covers overseeing business operations of the Philadelphia 76ers, New Jersey Devils, and Prudential Center.
