= New Era Tickets =

Entertainment ticketing company located in Exton, Pennsylvania, United States

- Company type: Subsidiary company
- Industry: Ticketing company
- Fate: merged with Paciolan
- Headquarters: Exton, Pennsylvania
- Key people: Fred Maglione, President & CEO; Chad Phillips, General Manager, Asia
- Owner: Comcast
- Parent: Comcast Spectacor
- Website: New Era Tickets Fan One Marketing

New Era Tickets was an entertainment ticketing company located in Exton, Pennsylvania, United States . The company provided full-service ticketing and fan marketing services for public assembly facilities, sports organizations, and entertainment companies.

New Era Tickets provided a ticketing platform with services that include internet ticket sales, order fulfillment, customer service, access control and print-at-home technology, up-selling and cross-selling, stored value technology, online ticket exchange, and ticket auctions.

In addition to the ticketing services, New Era Tickets also provided database marketing tools and services designed to improve ticket sales, give a view of customers and prospects, and increase customer retention. New Era Tickets does this through email deliverability, ability to customize messages and offers across marketing channels, lead scoring, and multi-tenant database architecture.

New Era Tickets was owned by Comcast Spectacor, a Philadelphia-based entertainment management company, and was headed by President and CEO Fred Maglione. The company uses technology provided by Paciolan and Neolane.

Comcast Spectacor acquired Paciolan in 2010; New Era Tickets was merged into Paciolan in 2014.
