= Steve Parish =

Steve Parish may refer to:

- Steve Parish (photographer), photographer and publisher
- Steve Parish (businessman), English businessman, co-owner and chairman of Crystal Palace football club

== See also ==
- Steve Parrish, British motorcycle and truck racer
