= Josh Harris (businessman) =

American investor and sports team owner (born 1964)

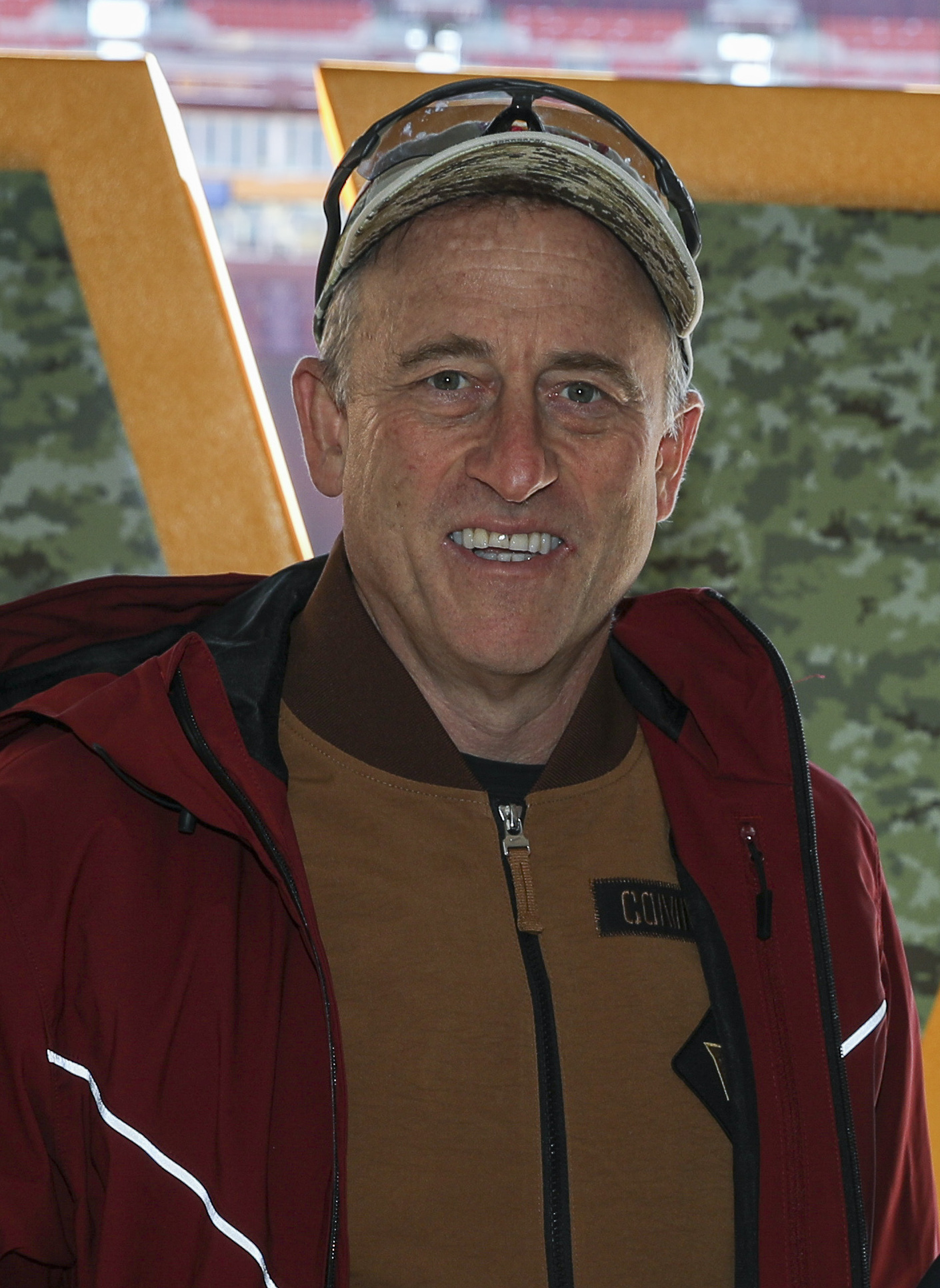
- Harris in 2023
- Born: Joshua Jordan Harris; December 29, 1964 (age 61); Chevy Chase, Maryland, U.S.
- Education: University of Pennsylvania (BS); Harvard University (MBA)
- Occupations: Investor; sports team owner
- Employers: Drexel Burnham Lambert (1986–1988); Apollo Global Management (1990–2022); 26North (2022–present)
- Organizations: Harris Blitzer Sports & Entertainment; Harris Philanthropies
- Title: Managing partner; Philadelphia 76ers (NBA); New Jersey Devils (NHL); Washington Commanders (NFL); Philadelphia WNBA team (WNBA); General partner; Crystal Palace (EPL); Minority partner; Joe Gibbs Racing
- Board member of: Mount Sinai Health System; Wharton School; Harvard Business School
- Spouse: Marjorie Harris (m. 1995)
- Children: 5

Joshua Jordan Harris (born December 29, 1964) is an American investor and sports team owner. Harris is a co-founder of the private equity firm Apollo Global Management and managing partner of the NBA team Philadelphia 76ers, the NHL team New Jersey Devils, and the NFL team Washington Commanders. He is also a general partner of the English football club Crystal Palace and holds a minority stake in Joe Gibbs Racing. He left Apollo in 2022 to focus on Harris Blitzer Sports & Entertainment, which he formed with David Blitzer in 2017 as a holding company for their shared sports properties.

Harris earned a degree in economics from the Wharton School at the University of Pennsylvania in 1986 and an MBA from Harvard Business School four years later, forming Apollo with Leon Black and Marc Rowan following graduation. Harris headed independent groups that acquired the 76ers in 2011, the Devils in 2013, and the Commanders in 2023. Other companies founded include Harris Philanthropies in 2014 and the alternative assets firm 26North in 2022. Harris has an estimated net worth of $12 billion as of 2026.

== Early life ==
Harris was born on December 29, 1964, in Chevy Chase, Maryland. He played several sports as a youth and considers them as having developed his work ethic, citing his favorite as wrestling. Harris graduated from The Field School in Washington, D.C. in 1982. He attended the University of Pennsylvania School of Arts and Sciences in Philadelphia before transferring as a freshman to the Wharton School to study economics after discovering an affinity for statistics. Harris graduated summa cum laude with a Bachelor of Science degree in 1986. He represented the Penn Quakers as a 118-pound collegiate wrestler and once matched with future Olympic gold medalist Bobby Weaver. During summer vacations in 1983 and 1984, Harris managed operations of a lemonade stand business with locations at the National Zoo and Farragut North station in Washington, D.C. He is a member of the Sigma Alpha Epsilon fraternity.

== Career ==
=== Private equity and finance ===
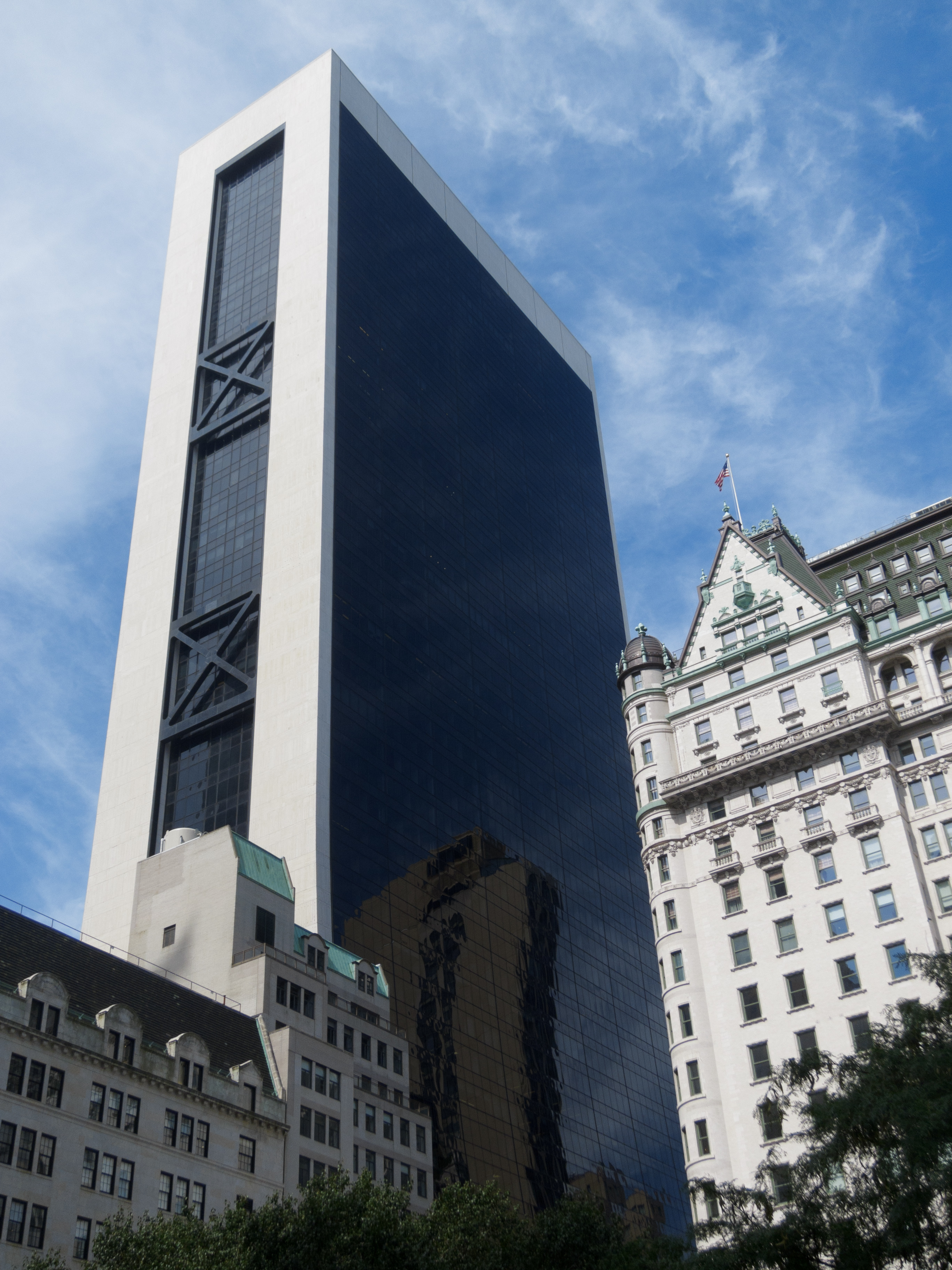
The Solow Building in New York City, headquarters of Apollo Global Management

Harris moved to New York City in 1986 to work as a mergers and acquisitions analyst at the Wall Street investment bank Drexel Burnham Lambert. He left after two years to attend Harvard Business School and received a Master of Business Administration degree (MBA) as a Baker Loeb Scholar, an honor given to the top 5% of the school's graduating class, in 1990. The same year, Drexel filed for bankruptcy due to engaging in illegal junk bond activity during the early 1990s recession. Harris worked two months at Blackstone before leaving to establish the private equity firm Apollo Global Management later that year with former Drexel partners Leon Black and Marc Rowan. In 2008, Harris led a $2 billion investment into the multinational chemical company LyondellBasell, which he sold in November 2013 for a profit of $9.6 billion, one of the largest gains in private equity history. In April 2009, Harris was ordered to pay $30 million in a settlement to Huntsman Corporation after Apollo was sued for backing out of a merger with them the previous year.

Harris met with Jared Kushner, a senior advisor in the first Trump administration, throughout 2017 to advise with infrastructure policy. A potential White House job was discussed prior to agreeing to loan $184 million to Kushner's private real estate firm Kushner Companies through Apollo. In May 2021, he announced he was stepping down from his day-to-day responsibilities at Apollo after being passed over as CEO for Marc Rowan, with his large personal focus on sports investments also reportedly becoming a source of tension within the company. The position had been made available after Leon Black announced he would be stepping down due to an investigation finding he had paid $158 million to convicted sex offender Jeffrey Epstein between 2012 and 2017 for advice on taxes and estate planning. He stepped down as senior managing director at Apollo in January 2022 and remained on their board of directors until his term ended in October. Black included Harris in a civil racketeering lawsuit the same year, alleging that he led a group within Apollo attempting to tarnish his reputation after his ties to Epstein were reported. Harris denied the claims, with federal judge Paul Engelmayer dismissing the suit that June for lack of evidence. Black would appeal before a court upheld the decision in March 2023. Harris founded the alternative asset firm 26North in September 2022, hiring former Brookfield Asset Management, Lehman Brothers, and Goldman Sachs executives as partners. The firm offers direct lending and invests primarily in private equity, credit, and insurance companies, holding over $35 billion in assets under management as of 2026.

Harris is on the board of trustees of Mount Sinai Health System, Wharton, and Harvard Business School, and is a member of the Council on Foreign Relations think tank. He previously served on the Investor Advisory Committee on Financial Markets for the New York Federal Reserve, as vice president and treasurer of the Allen-Stevenson School, and on the board of the United States Olympic Committee. His family office, HRS Management, was the largest investor in the American political newspaper The Hill before selling to Nexstar Media Group in August 2021. In 2022, Harris invested $10 million in the Philadelphia-based real estate company Mosaic Development Partners and formed a joint venture with Canvas Property Group through HMS Management with the intention to buy over $1 billion worth of properties. He and investors Mark Penn, James Tisch, and Thomas Peterffy contributed to a $50 million startup fund in 2023 for The Messenger, an American news website that went defunct a year later.

=== Sports ownership ===
List of major sports franchises owned
Team	League	Acquired	Notes
Philadelphia 76ers	National Basketball Association (NBA)	2011	Managing partner with David Blitzer under Harris Blitzer Sports & Entertainment (HBSE). Includes the Delaware Blue Coats of the NBA G League.
New Jersey Devils	National Hockey Association (NHL)	2013	Co-managing partner under HBSE. Includes the Utica Comets of the American Hockey League.
Crystal Palace	Premier League	2015	General partner alongside Steve Parish, David Blitzer, and Woody Johnson. Harris acquired an 18% stake in 2015. In July 2025, Johnson completed the acquisition of Eagle Football Holdings' 42.92% stake in Crystal Palace.
Washington Commanders	National Football League (NFL)	2023	Managing partner. $6 billion transaction was the largest in sports history at the time.
Philadelphia WNBA team	Women's National Basketball Association (WNBA)	2025	Managing partner under HBSE; name to be chosen at a later date. To begin play in 2030.

Harris began contemplating investing in sports after meeting senior Blackstone executive David Blitzer while working in London in 2008. Those talks led to the pair forming an investment group that, in October 2011, acquired the Philadelphia 76ers of the National Basketball Association (NBA) from Comcast Spectacor for $280 million. Harris presided over an era in 76ers history known as "The Process", in which the team tanked for improved NBA draft lottery odds. The Process was unpopular with other team owners and league executives, who lobbied NBA commissioner Adam Silver to step in due to the 76ers' poor performance affecting league-wide revenue sharing. Harris would eventually agree to a suggestion by Silver to hire former Phoenix Suns owner Jerry Colangelo as team chairman in December 2015, with general manager Sam Hinkie, credited with spearheading "The Process", stepping down in April 2016. Joel Embiid, the 2022–23 NBA Most Valuable Player, was among the players taken during the era. The 76ers were valued at $6.1 billion in 2026.

In August 2013, Harris and Blitzer acquired the New Jersey Devils of the National Hockey League (NHL) from Jeff Vanderbeek for $320 million. The deal included operating rights to their home venue, the Prudential Center. The Devils were valued at $2.4 billion in 2025, with the Prudential Center ranked among the highest-grossing arenas globally. He purchased an 18% stake in the English football club Crystal Palace in December 2015, which is operated as a general partnership consisting of himself, Blitzer, John Textor, and club chairman Steve Parish. In September 2016, Harris and Blitzer acquired the esports organizations Dignitas and Apex Gaming through the 76ers and merged them under the Dignitas brand.

In September 2017, the pair founded Harris Blitzer Sports & Entertainment (HBSE) to consolidate their sports ventures. The company was valued at $14.58 billion in 2025. In addition to the 76ers and Devils, HBSE also owns the Delaware Blue Coats of the NBA G League and the Utica Comets of the American Hockey League. In June 2020, Harris and Blitzer acquired a combined $140 million stake in the Pittsburgh Steelers of the National Football League (NFL). In 2022, he headed a group consisting of Blitzer, airline executive Martin Broughton, politician and Olympic gold medalist Sebastian Coe, tennis player Serena Williams, and racing driver Lewis Hamilton that pursued a bid to purchase Chelsea of the Premier League before it was sold to Todd Boehly and Clearlake Capital for €4.25 billion ($4.5 billion). He also pursued a bid the same year for the New York Mets of Major League Baseball (MLB) before it was sold to Steve Cohen for $2.4 billion. In 2023, Harris and Blitzer explored buying stakes in the English football club Manchester United.

In June 2023, he acquired a minority stake in Joe Gibbs Racing by way of HBSE. The following month, Harris and a 20-member group including Danaher and Glenstone founder Mitchell Rales, Hall of Fame basketball player and entrepreneur Magic Johnson, and venture capitalist Mark Ein as limited partners, acquired the NFL's Washington Commanders and Northwest Stadium from Daniel Snyder for $6.05 billion, the highest price paid for a sports team at the time. Harris and Johnson had previously bid on the NFL's Denver Broncos in 2022 before it was sold to a group headed by Walmart executives Rob Walton and Greg Penner. In early 2024, the pair sold their stake in the Steelers to Art Rooney II and Thomas Tull as NFL rules mandate a majority owner can not hold stake in another team. Harris and Blitzer have also invested in youth sports brands, forming Unrivaled Sports as a parent company in March 2024 with capital from The Chernin Group. In June 2025, HBSE was awarded a $250 million bid for a Philadelphia WNBA team to begin play in 2030.

==== Management style and initiatives ====
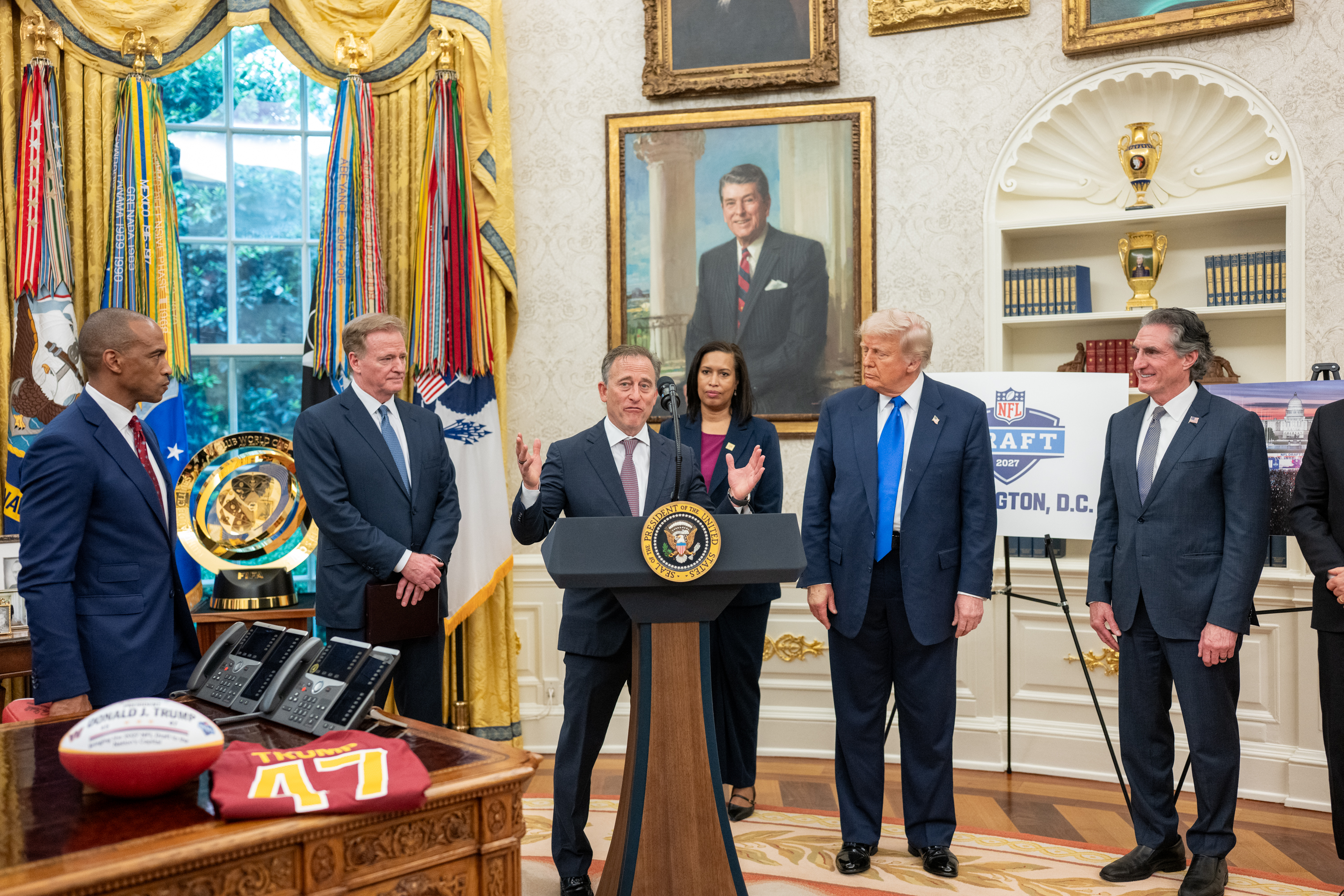
Harris in the Oval Office in 2025 announcing Washington, D.C. as the host city of the 2027 NFL draft

Harris employs general managers to operate his teams and venues. He values sports science and analytics, with former 76ers president of basketball operations Daryl Morey being a leading proponent of the field. In March 2020, Harris and Blitzer committed to pay Prudential Center employees for any canceled events due to the outbreak of the COVID-19 pandemic, which saw the NBA and NHL suspend operations for much of the year. He introduced plans to reduce salaries of HBSE, 76ers, and Devils employees making over $100,000 by 20% the same month but reversed the decision after receiving public criticism, including an effort by 76ers player Joel Embiid to cover the losses of those affected.

Harris announced plans in July 2022 for a $1.3 billion arena, 76 Place at Market East, to be built for the 76ers in the Center City neighborhood of Philadelphia. The proposal faced opposition from the public, especially among residents of the nearby Chinatown neighborhood who feared it would negatively affect the area economically. Despite being approved, plans for it were abandoned in January 2025 after a deal was announced with Comcast Spectacor to build and co-operate the New South Philadelphia Arena in the South Philadelphia Sports Complex, which is expected to open for the 76ers and the NHL's Philadelphia Flyers in 2031. In April 2025, Harris and D.C. mayor Muriel Bowser announced a $3.8 billion redevelopment project replacing RFK Stadium in Washington, D.C., with a New Stadium at RFK Campus to serve as the Commanders' home venue upon its scheduled opening in 2030.

== Personal life ==
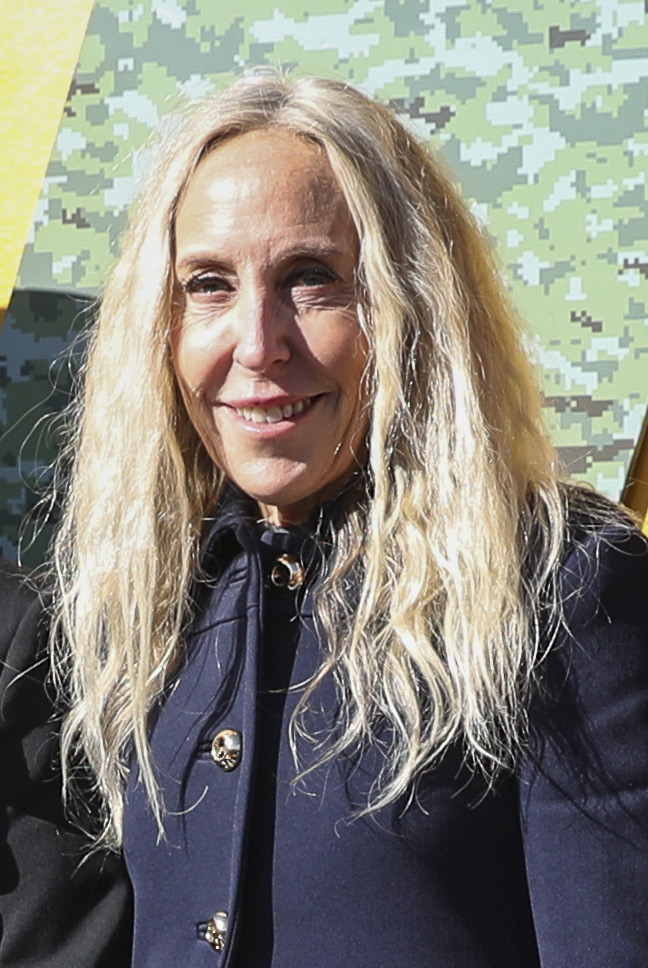
Harris' wife Marjorie in 2023

Harris' paternal and maternal grandparents immigrated to the U.S. from Russian territories in the early 20th century. His father, Jacob, was an orthodontist and his mother Sylvia was a schoolteacher; he has a younger brother named Gabe. Harris is Jewish and practices Reform Judaism, having his bar mitzvah in 1977 at the Washington Hebrew Congregation. He spent three weeks working in Yahel, a Reform kibbutz in Israel, on a NFTY-sponsored trip in high school. He married Marjorie Rubin in 1995. They met at Harvard and have five children together. Harris and businessman Mark Ein have been close friends since elementary school; they later attended Wharton and Harvard together and shared beach houses on Long Island during their time on Wall Street.

Harris grew up a fan of Washington, D.C. sports teams, attending Washington Redskins football games at RFK Stadium and Washington Bullets basketball games at the Capital Centre with his family. Harris received the Outstanding American Award from the National Wrestling Hall of Fame in 2013. He also competes in marathons and triathlons, finishing the 2010 New York City Marathon in 3:53:41 and the 2011 Philadelphia Marathon in 3:48:12. Harris threw the ceremonial first pitch at a Washington Nationals baseball game in September 2023. In June 2025, he bought a one-of-one trading card of Commanders quarterback Jayden Daniels for display at Northwest Stadium at an auction at Fanatics Fest NYC for $500,000. He also spoke on the "Command the Room" panel with Daniels at the convention.

Harris was inducted into Kappa Beta Phi, a Wall Street fraternity, in 2011. In November 2017, he purchased the Dommerich Mansion, a 21,000-square-foot townhouse on the Upper East Side of Manhattan for $52 million. In July 2021, he purchased a 9,100-square-foot mansion in Miami Beach from Marcelo Claure for $32 million. Harris frequently uses private helicopters to attend games. Due to a scheduling error, he once caused the cancellation of a youth soccer match being held at Newark's St. Benedict's Preparatory School, as the field is sometimes used as a helipad.

His net worth was estimated in January 2026 to be $11.4 billion by Forbes and $12.8 billion by the Bloomberg Billionaires Index. He held $2.54 billion in Apollo shares as of June 2023.

A 2026 release trove of the Epstein files showed that Harris exchanged emails and phone calls with child sex offender Jeffrey Epstein between 2013 and 2016. The communications included scheduling and routine business matters, including attempts by Epstein's office to arrange meetings at his Manhattan residence with Harris and other business figures. A breakfast meeting in 2014 referenced in subsequent correspondence indicated that Harris was in attendance alongside other attendees. Harris has subsequently denied ever having a relationship with Epstein.

=== Philanthropy ===
Harris and his wife founded Harris Philanthropies, a nonprofit organization based in New York City, in 2014. He established the $5 million Harris Center for Precision Wellness at New York's Icahn Genomics Institute in 2015. Between 2015 and 2020, Harris donated a total of $3.5 million to the Philadelphia Police Athletic League chapter, $648,000 to the Republican Party, and $190,000 to the Democratic Party. He has been partnered with After-School All-Stars since 2016, providing a $1 million grant for six schools in Newark, Philadelphia, and Camden. Harris has also supported the University of Pennsylvania with several donations and sponsorships, including $1 million to the Penn Quakers wrestling program, the Harris Family Endowed Scholarship program for undergraduate students from the Washington, D.C., area, and the $10 million Harris Family Alternative Investments program. He has also participated in forums and panels hosted by organizations such as the Milken Institute, the MIT Sloan Sports Analytics Conference, and the Economic Club of Washington, D.C.

Harris has contributed to socioeconomic programs in Israel through sports, founding a youth basketball league known as the 48ers and funding a project integrating Ethiopian Jews in the country. During the COVID-19 pandemic, he donated over $7 million worth of food and medical supplies to various Philadelphia-based groups and organizations. Harris through HBSE committed $20 million to fight racial injustice in wake of the 2020 George Floyd protests. He donated $2 million the same year to The Bridgespan Group to expand their nonprofit programs in Philadelphia and Camden. In 2022, he established the $5 million Harris Family Fund for Sports Management and Alternative Investments program at Harvard Business School, and donating to the Reform Alliance, several Philadelphia-area homeless shelters, and mobile cancer clinics to the University of Miami Miller School of Medicine. The same year, Harris donated $1 million to Fund for Health, a collaboration health equity fund by Penn Med and Wharton, with another million to Penn Med to promote student diversity in clinical medicine and biomedical research. In 2025, he donated $5 million for the construction of an athletic training center at The Field School, his alma mater.
