= Comcast Spectacor =

American sports and entertainment company

- Formerly: Spectacor (1974–1996)
- Type: Division
- Industry: Professional sports
- Founded: 1974; 52 years ago
- Founder: Ed Snider
- Headquarters: Philadelphia, Pennsylvania, U.S.
- Key people: Daniel J. Hilferty (Chairman and CEO); Todd Glickman (EVP)
- Parent: Comcast (1996–present)
- Subsidiaries: Xfinity Mobile Arena; Philadelphia Flyers; Seoul Infernal; Philadelphia Wings; Flyers Skate Zone; G4 Media; T1
- Website: comcastspectacor.com

Comcast Spectacor is an American sports and entertainment company and division of Comcast based in Philadelphia, Pennsylvania. It owns the Philadelphia Flyers of the National Hockey League, the Philadelphia Wings of the National Lacrosse League, the Seoul Infernal of the Overwatch League, and formerly owned the Philadelphia 76ers of the National Basketball Association and the Maine Mariners of the ECHL. The company owns and manages the Xfinity Mobile Arena and formerly managed the Spectrum in South Philadelphia, plus several community skating rinks in the Philadelphia region. The Comcast SportsNet (CSN) regional sports networks were also owned by Comcast Spectacor prior to parent company Comcast's acquisition of NBCUniversal in January 2011; CSN is now operated through NBC Sports.

The company was formed in 1974 by Flyers founder and chairman Ed Snider as Spectacor, the parent company of both the Flyers and the Spectrum. Snider had been instrumental in getting the Spectrum built in 1967 and assumed control of the arena in 1971. He sold a 63% stake in Spectacor to Comcast in 1996 but remained as chairman of the renamed Comcast Spectacor. Shortly afterward, Comcast Spectacor bought the 76ers; as the Spectrum's owner, Snider had been the Sixers' landlord since 1971. Comcast Spectacor sold the 76ers to Josh Harris in 2011. In April 2016, Snider died at his home in California. On September 22, 2016, Comcast bought out the remaining 24% stake in Spectacor that it did not already own.

== Spectra Experiences ==
Comcast Spectacor previously owned Spectra (formerly Global Spectrum, Ovations and Paciolan). Globally, Spectra served 300-plus clients at more than 400 properties including public assembly facilities throughout the United States and Canada. Some included:

- Addition Financial Arena at the University of Central Florida in Orlando, Florida
- Angel of the Winds Arena in Everett, Washington
- Atlantic City Convention Center and Boardwalk Hall in Atlantic City, New Jersey
- Augusta Entertainment Complex in Augusta, Georgia
- Canada Life Place in London, Ontario, Canada
- Casey's Center, part of the Iowa Events Center in Des Moines, Iowa
- Chaifetz Arena at Saint Louis University in St. Louis, Missouri
- Citizens Bank Park in Philadelphia
- Cleveland State University Wolstein Center, in Cleveland, Ohio
- Cross Insurance Arena in Portland, Maine
- Cross Insurance Center in Bangor, Maine
- Crown Coliseum in Fayetteville, North Carolina
- CURE Insurance Arena in Trenton, New Jersey
- Denny Sanford Premier Center in Sioux Falls, South Dakota
- Duke Energy Convention Center in Cincinnati, Ohio
- Federal Way Performing Arts and Event Center, Federal Way, Washington
- Ford Entertainment Complex in Beaumont, Texas
- Glens Falls Civic Center in Glens Falls, New York
- Liacouras Center at Temple University in Philadelphia, Pennsylvania
- Lowell Memorial Auditorium, located in Lowell, Massachusetts
- Oakland Coliseum in Oakland, California
- Overland Park Convention Center in Overland Park, Kansas
- PeoplesBank Arena in Hartford, Connecticut
- PPL Center in Allentown, Pennsylvania
- Sears Centre Arena in Hoffman Estates, Illinois, a Chicago suburb
- SeatGeek Stadium in Bridgeview, Illinois, a Chicago suburb
- Sioux Falls Convention Center in Sioux Falls, South Dakota
- South Okanagan Events Centre in Penticton, British Columbia
- Sporting Park in Kansas City, Kansas
- St. Charles Convention Center in Saint Charles, Missouri
- State Farm Stadium in Glendale, Arizona
- Subaru Park in Chester, Pennsylvania, a Philadelphia suburb
- Tribute Communities Centre in Oshawa, Ontario, Canada
- Tyson Events Center in Sioux City, Iowa
- University of Massachusetts Amherst William D. Mullins Memorial Center, located in Amherst, Massachusetts
- University of Massachusetts Lowell Tsongas Center, located in Lowell, Massachusetts
- Value City Arena at The Ohio State University, in Columbus, Ohio
- Watsco Center at the University of Miami in Coral Gables, Florida
- Xfinity Mobile Arena is in Spectra's corporate hometown of Philadelphia. The Xfinity Mobile Arena's predecessor, The Spectrum, is the namesake of the company.
- WFCU Centre in Windsor, Ontario
- Colisée Vidéotron in Trois-Rivières, Quebec, Canada

In August 2021, it was announced that Spectra would be merging with Oak View Group to form a full-service live events company. That November, Oak View acquired Comcast's stake in the business, which it has since folded into its holdings.

== Other businesses ==
Comcast Spectacor owns Ovations Food Services, which provides food and beverage services to arenas, stadiums, amphitheaters, fairgrounds and convention centers throughout the United States. The roots of the name Ovations go back to a restaurant in the Spectrum, which was located below the concourse.

The company, then Spectacor, owned a film production company, Spectacor Films, formed by Ed Snider in 1988, and later went defunct in 1999, and briefly was the co-owner with Michael Jaffe and other producers of the independent television syndication company, ACI, which was sold to Pearson Television in 1995.

New Era Tickets is the full-service ticketing subsidiary of Comcast Spectacor, and provides in-house ticketing in the US and Canada. In Philadelphia, the company operates under the name ComcastTIX and provides tickets to events at Xfinity Mobile Arena, Liacouras Center at Temple University, CURE Insurance Arena in Trenton, New Jersey, and the Borgata Hotel Casino and Spa in Atlantic City, New Jersey.

Comcast Spectacor owned the Seoul Infernal, an Overwatch League team formerly known as the Philadelphia Fusion, until the closure of the Overwatch League. The organization partnered with SK Telecom to establish a joint venture with T1 Entertainment & Sports to develop esports teams around the world; Comcast Spectacor currently owns a 32% stake.

Comcast Spectacor also oversaw the second iteration of G4, a former video game-centric cable and satellite network that was operated by G4 Media from April 24, 2002, to December 31, 2014. The network was relaunched in November 2021 and shuttered in November of the following year.
