= Thomas R. Carskadon House =

Historic house in West Virginia, United States

- U.S. National Register of Historic Places
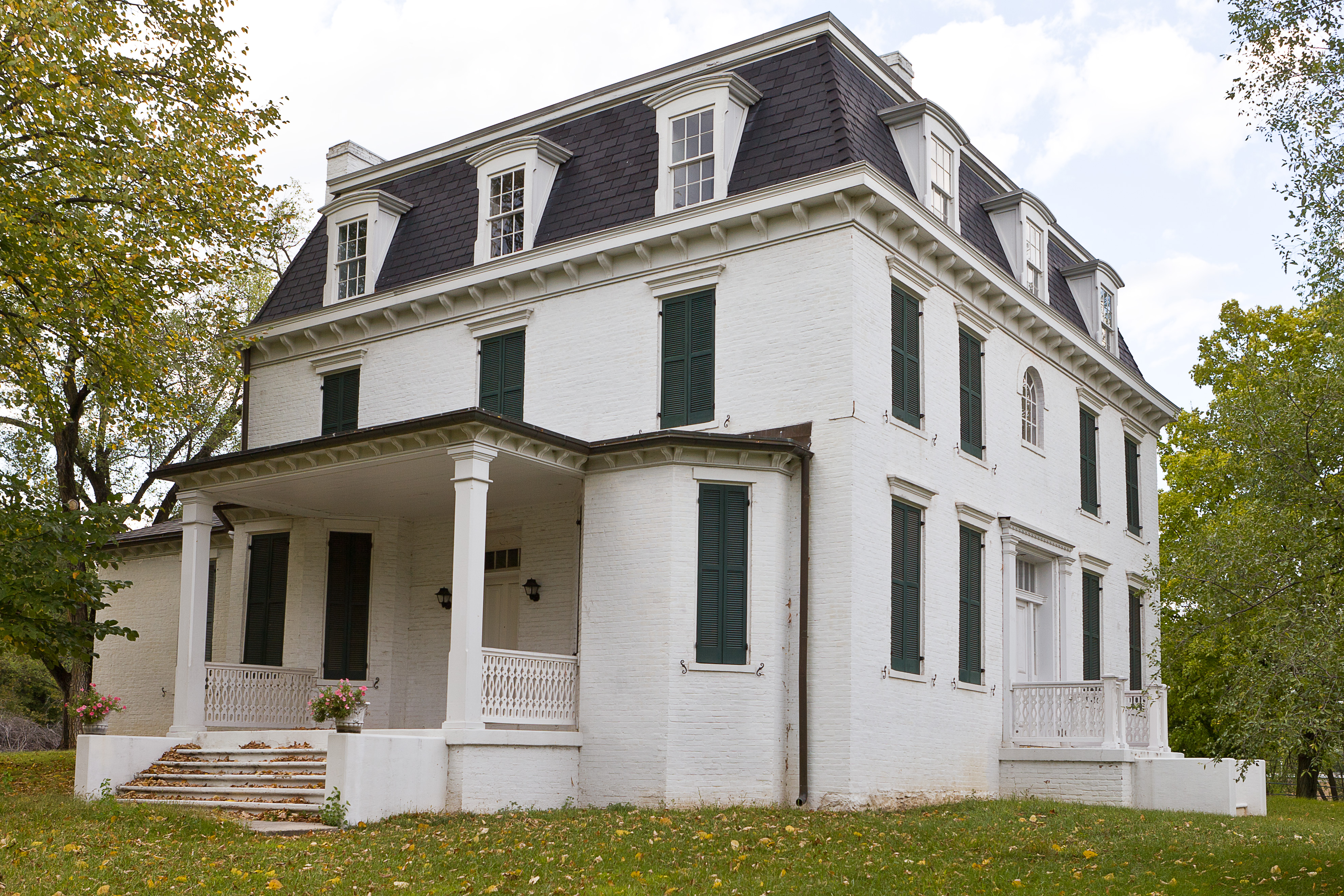

- Location within Eastern Panhandle of West Virginia Location within West Virginia Location within the United States
- Location: Carskadon Rd., Keyser, West Virginia
- Coordinates: 39°25′53″N 78°59′17″W
- Area: 1 acre (0.40 ha)
- Architectural style: Italianate, Second Empire
- NRHP reference No.: 02000900
- Added to NRHP: August 22, 2002

Thomas R. Carskadon House also known as the Carskadon Mansion and "Radical Hill," is a historic home located on Radical Hill overlooking Mineral Street (US 220), in Keyser, Mineral County, West Virginia. It is the former residence of Thomas R. Carskadon, an influential Mineral County farmer and political leader. It was built about 1886, and has two sections: a 2 1/2-story rectangular, brick main block and a two-story rear ell. It features a hip-on-mansard roof and two one-story, brick polygonal bays. It combines features of the Italianate and French Second Empire styles. Also on the property are the ruins of a brick dairy, the cement foundations of a silo, and the stone foundations of another outbuilding.

It was listed on the National Register of Historic Places in 2002.

== See also ==
- Sonnencroft
- High Gate
