= Whitemarsh Hall =

Former mansion in Wyndmoor, Pennsylvania

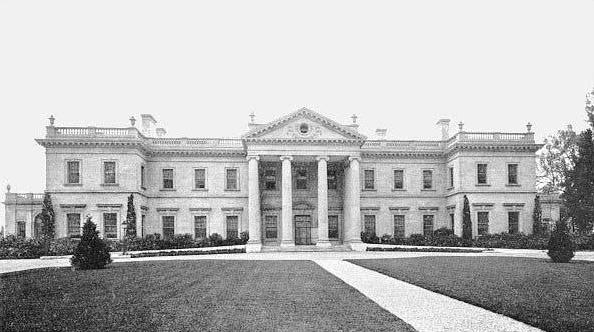
- Exterior view of the mansion
- Interactive map of the Whitemarsh Hall area

General information
- Type: Gilded Age Mansion
- Architectural style: Neoclassical Revival
- Location: Wyndmoor, Pennsylvania, United States
- Coordinates: 40.0936°N 75.1982°W
- Construction started: 1916
- Completed: 1921
- Demolished: 1980
- Cost: about $10 million (equivalent to $318 million in 2025)
- Client: Edward T. Stotesbury

Technical details
- Floor count: 6
- Floor area: 100,000 square feet (9,300 m^{2})

Design and construction
- Architect: Horace Trumbauer

Whitemarsh Hall was an estate owned by banking executive Edward T. Stotesbury and his wife, Eva, on 400 acres (1.6 km^{2}) of land in Wyndmoor, Pennsylvania, United States. Designed by the Gilded Age architect Horace Trumbauer, it was built in 1921 and demolished in 1980. Before its destruction, the mansion was the third-largest private residence in the United States, and it remains the largest American house ever to be demolished on purpose.

Despite the name, Whitemarsh Hall was located in Springfield Township, not in Whitemarsh Township which borders Springfield to the west.

== History ==
=== Construction and appointments ===
Designed by the Beaux-Arts architect Horace Trumbauer between 1916 and 1921, Whitemarsh Hall included six stories (three of which were partly or fully underground). There were 147 rooms across 100,000 square feet (9,300 m^{2}), which included 45 bathrooms, in addition to specialty rooms such as a ballroom, gymnasium, movie theatre, and a refrigerating plant. The neo-Georgian mansion had been a wedding present from Stotesbury to his second wife, Eva (the former Lucretia Cromwell, née Roberts). Completion was delayed by World War I; while the exterior was mostly completed by the end of the war, the interior decorations and furnishings, many of which had to come from war-ravaged Europe, took much longer to arrive.

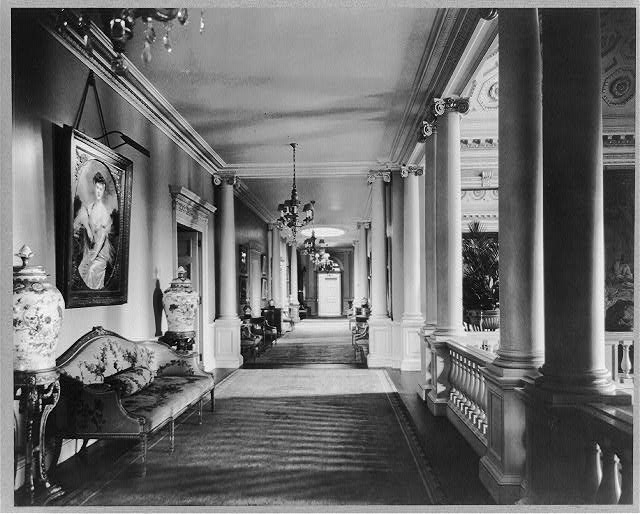
Second floor hall

The mansion was lavishly decorated with statues, paintings, and tapestry that Stotesbury had collected over the years, a collection later bequeathed to the Philadelphia Museum of Art. The French 18th-century furniture was purchased through Lord Duveen, who had guided Stotesbury in assembling the second of America's great collections of English portraits, and the floor was lined with exquisite Oriental rugs, also purchased under the guidance of Duveen. Stotesbury was also advised by Duveen in the purchasing of French sculpture to decorate the huge mansion.

The gardens and landscaping were designed by the urbanist and architect Jacques Gréber, whose designs in the grand manner of André Le Nôtre for the Philadelphian P.A.B. Widener at Lynnewood Hall had recommended him to Trumbauer and to Eva Stotesbury, who moved into a house next to the estate to follow the progress of construction at close hand.

=== Life at Whitemarsh Hall ===
The estate also included several lesser houses and utility buildings spread over the 400 acres (1.6 km^{2}), as well as four large greenhouses for growing trees and ferns. Smaller greenhouses were used for growing the many flowers needed to decorate the house for the lavish parties the Stotesburys liked to host. More than 70 gardeners worked at maintaining the grounds. The inside staff usually numbered 40, but many of them would follow the Stotesburys as they made their yearly pilgrimages to their Florida mansion, El Mirasol, for the winter and to Wingwood House, their mansion in Bar Harbor, Maine, for the summer.

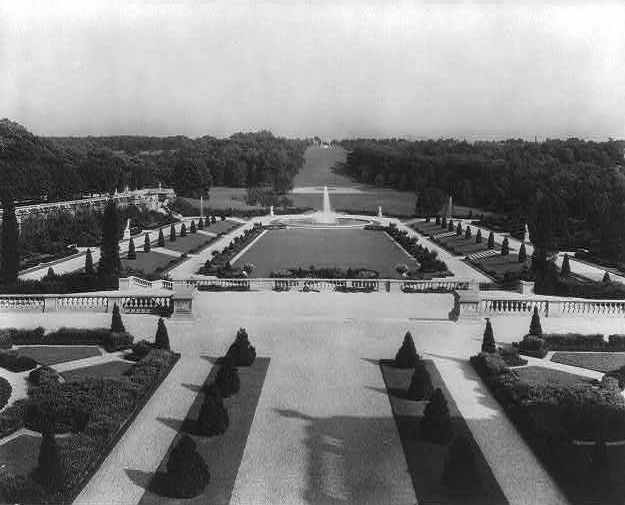
Jacques Gréber designed the gardens, including the mile-long allée, looking east from the Mansion. Photo:c. 1922. The steps at the center of the photo are still there today.

In addition to E. T., Eva and their servants, Whitemarsh Hall was also designed with Eva's two children in mind (adults by the time it opened), who were given their own rooms in the house. Her son Jimmy frequently resided within, as did (to a lesser extent) her daughter Louise.

For about nine years the mansion was the site of lavish balls and receptions. The intensity of the party life dropped a bit after the Great Depression in 1929, and fell even more after 1933 when the Stotesburys were openly criticized for enjoying a life of splendor while most of the country suffered the hardships of the depression. The death of one of E. T. Stotesbury's own daughters in 1935 continued to dampen the Stotesburys' enthusiasm for festivities.

Whitemarsh Hall had often been called the "American Versailles", because of the level of attention to detail in the gardens and in the main building.

=== After Stotesbury ===
Eva Stotesbury discovered, after the death of her husband in 1938, that she was relatively broke. Stotesbury had once declared that it cost him over a million dollars a year to maintain the house and the extensive property surrounding it. As a result of the Great Depression, the value of Whitemarsh Hall and its opulent furnishings was significantly lowered. Eva closed the mansion and moved to one of her other mansions, El Mirasol in Palm Beach, Florida. She donated the 2-mile-long (3 km), 8-foot-tall (2.4 m) steel fence to the War Department to be turned into metal for 18,000 guns.

During much of World War II, the property was used for warehousing the bulk of New York's Metropolitan Museum of Art art treasures as it was feared that the Germans would bombard Manhattan from U-boats or warships. Eva Stotesbury had already put the property on the market after her husband's death, but there were no buyers. The property did not sell until 1943.

=== Transformation, then abandonment ===
Whitemarsh Hall was finally sold for $167,000 to the Pennsalt Chemical Corporation (today part of Total Petrochemicals USA), which transformed the building into a research laboratory. Much of the grounds surrounding the mansion were sold for real estate development, which was quickly realized after the war ended. Pennsalt kept the mansion and its remaining grounds maintained and modernized, and constructed some new facilities on the property as well.

In 1963, Pennsalt (later renamed Pennwalt) built a new research center in the King of Prussia area, and moved out of Whitemarsh Hall, which was sold to a property investment group. Efforts to preserve or sell the mansion intact by this and successive owners were unsuccessful, and as the property became neglected and vandalized over the following years, demolition was decided upon. Disputes over the form of residential redevelopment to be undertaken (especially plans which envisioned luxury apartment towers) delayed demolition for a number of years.

== The site today ==
The mansion, which was larger than the White House in Washington, D.C. was demolished in 1980, and a development of modern townhouses called Stotesbury Estates was built on the property. The massive limestone pillars which were part of the mansion's front portico were left in situ as a tribute, along with the large belvedere at the back of the home. No homes occupy the footprint of the mansion itself, whose basements and foundations were simply backfilled. Small remnants of the huge gardens still exist today, including a fountain, several statues, stairs, and pieces of low stone fence and walls. The twin pillars of the estate's main gate, which was one mile (1.6 km) from the back of Whitemarsh Hall, are still standing on Douglas Road off Willow Grove Avenue, minus the steel gates. The gatehouse on Douglas Road, behind the main entrance pillars, also remains, converted to a private residence. A separate gate house used as the rear service entrance also exists as a private home on Paper Mill Road.

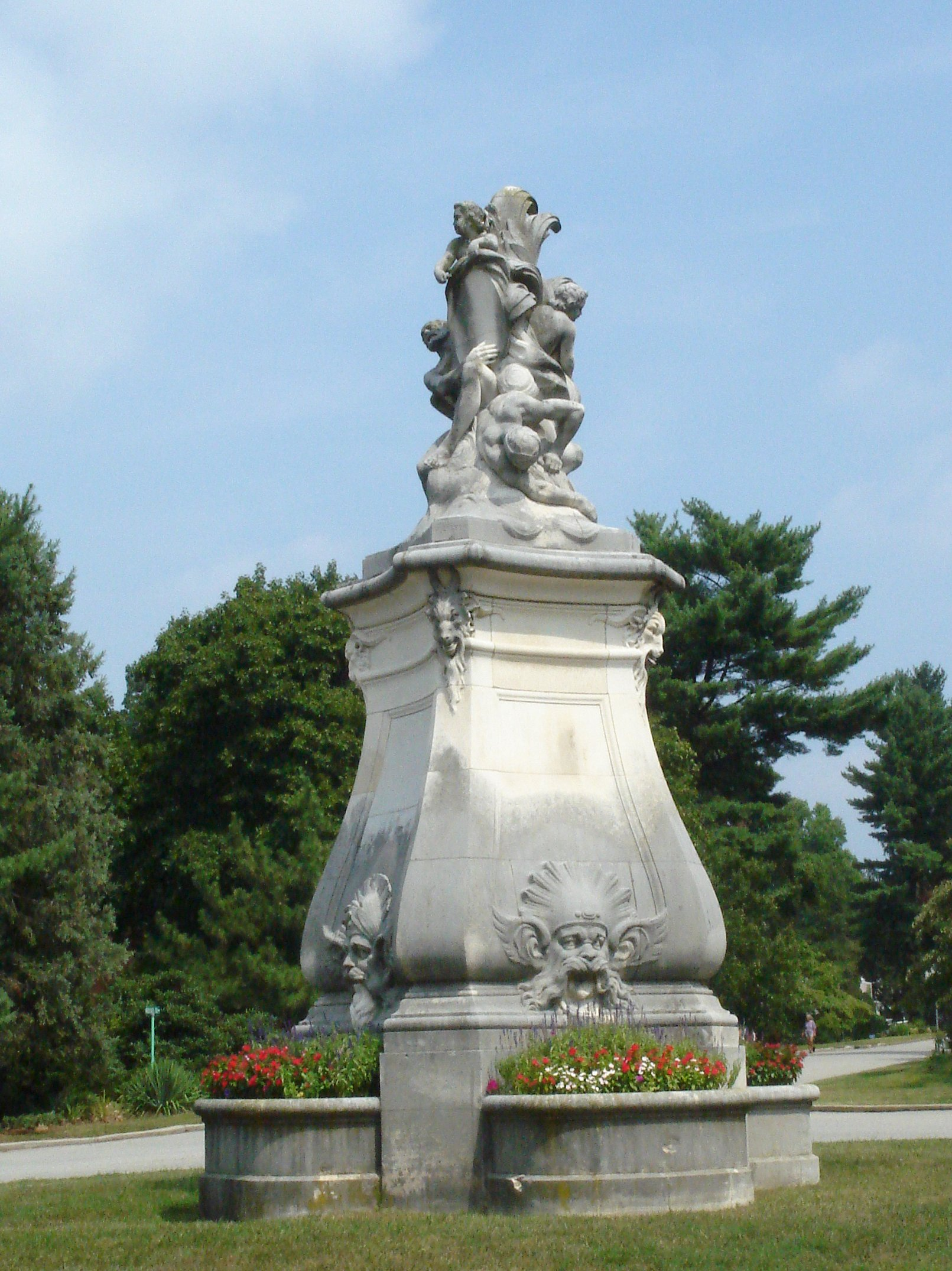
A statue remaining from the Whitemarsh estate

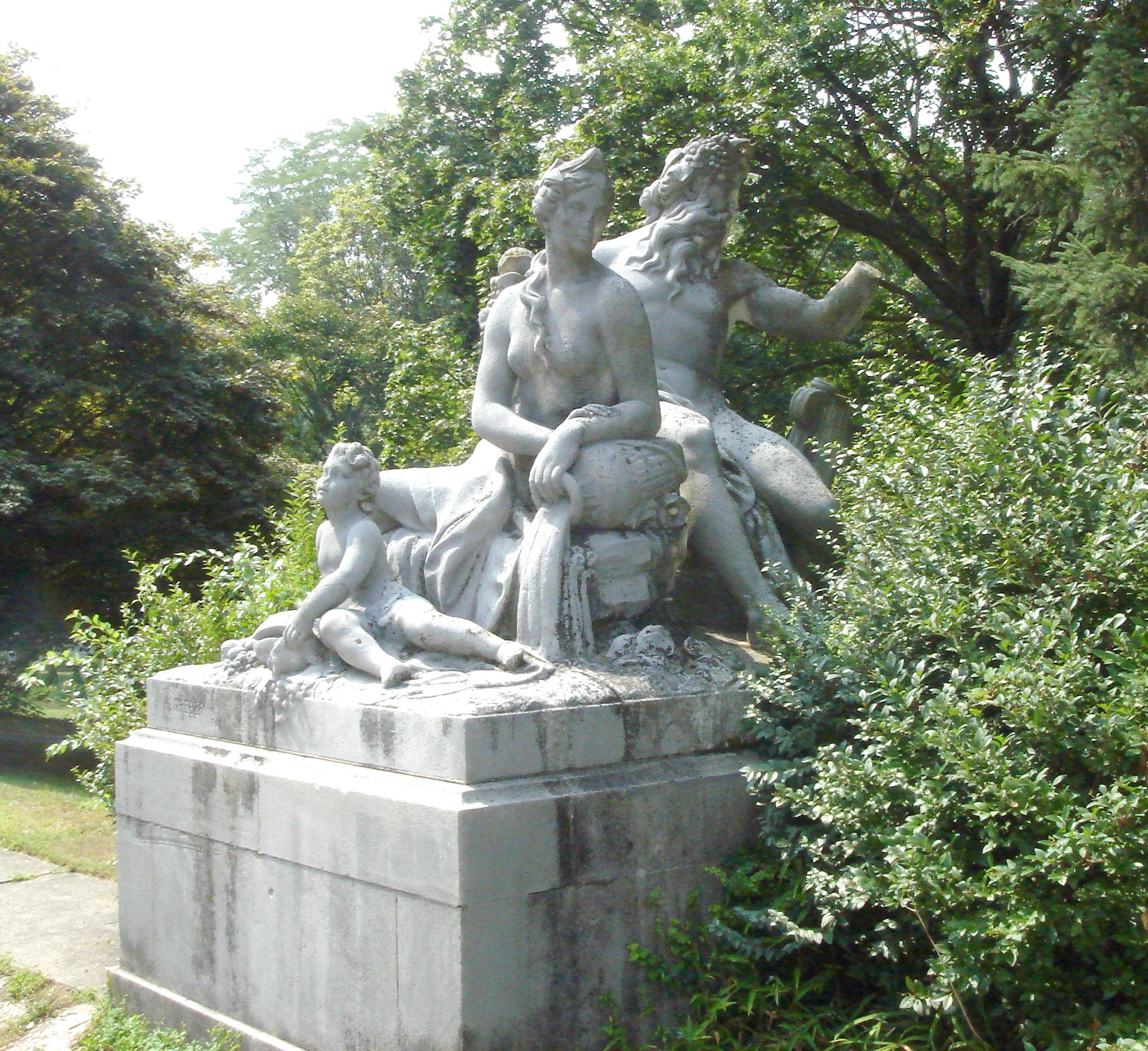
Remaining statue, "Le Loire et Le Loiret," casting by Henri-Léon Gréber, of the original by Corneille Van Clève.

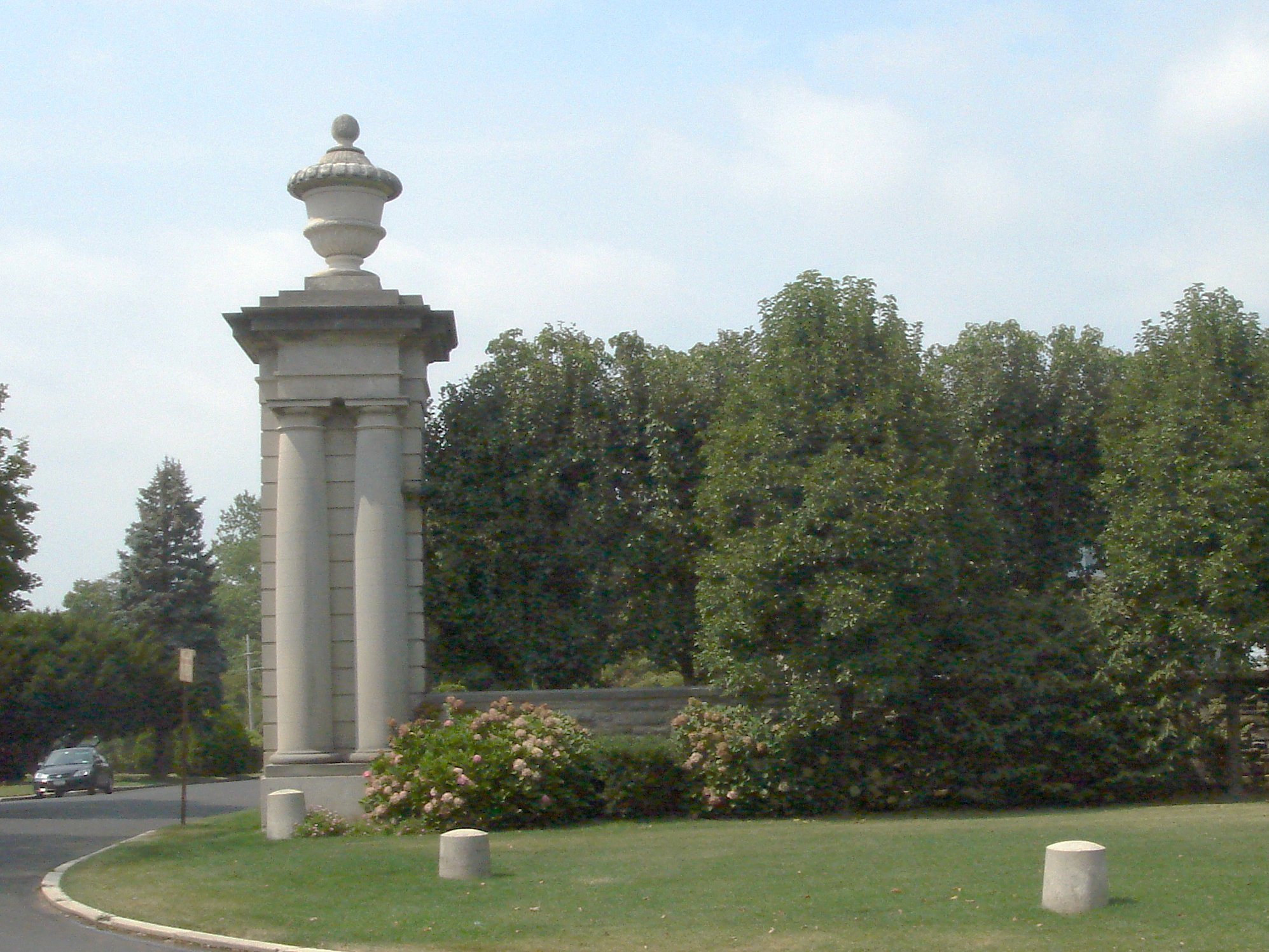
A remaining pillar of the main entrance to Whitemarsh Hall
