= Equitable Trust Building =

- U.S. National Register of Historic Places
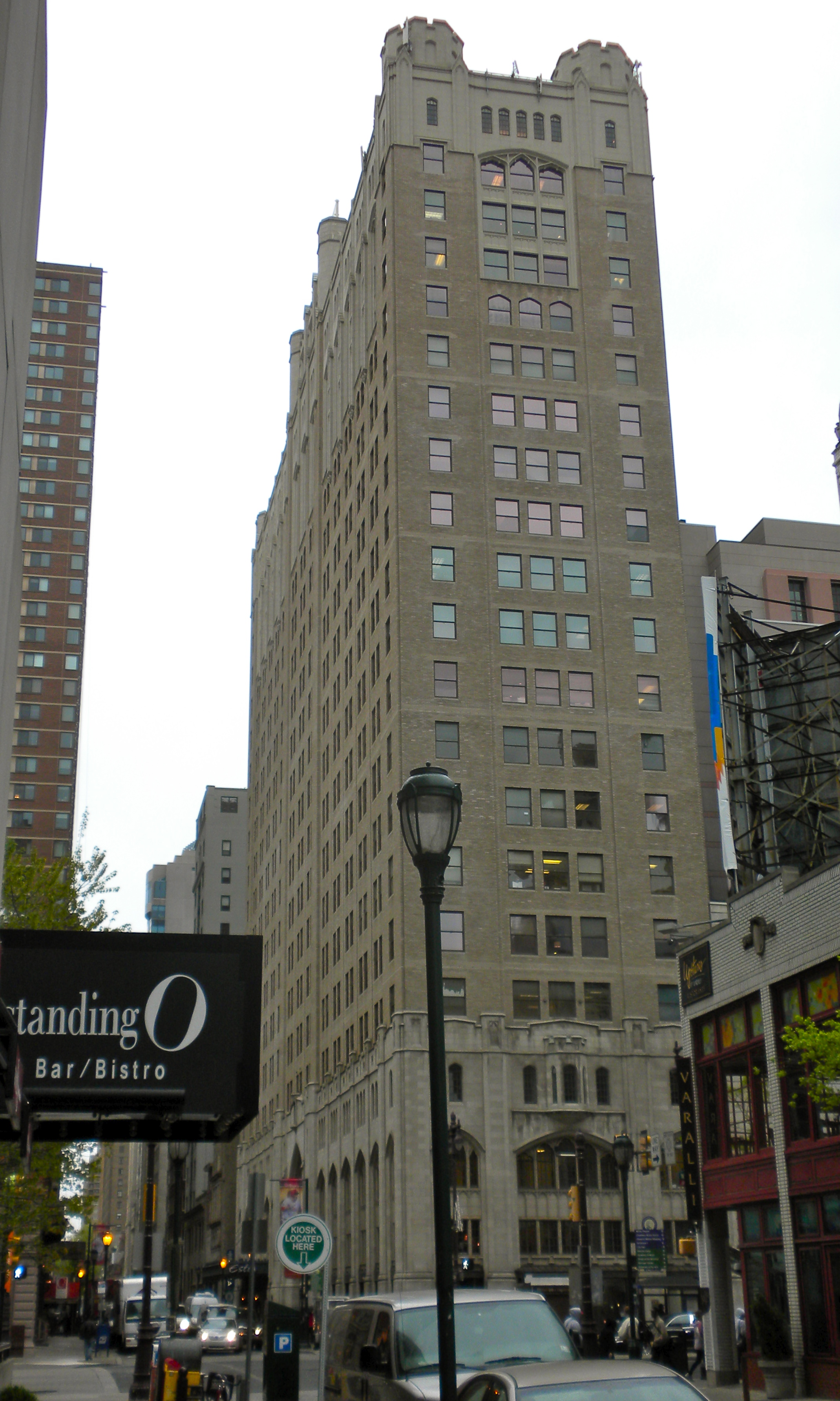
- The Equitable Trust Building in April 2010

- Location within Philadelphia Location within Pennsylvania Location within the United States
- Location: 1405 Locust St., Philadelphia, Pennsylvania
- Coordinates: 39°56′55″N 75°9′54″W
- Area: 0.6 acres (0.24 ha)
- Built: 1925
- Architect: Horace Trumbauer
- Architectural style: Late Gothic Revival
- NRHP reference No.: 86001405
- Added to NRHP: July 3, 1986

The Equitable Trust Building, also known as the Broad and Locust Building, is a historic commercial skyscraper located at 1405 Locust Street in Philadelphia.

The building was listed on the National Register of Historic Places on July 3, 1986.

== Description and history ==
Situated three blocks south of Philadelphia City Hall designed by Horace Trumbauer. Trumbauer designed the 21-story building in 1925 after completing a similarly styled residential building, the Chateau Crillon Apartment House on Rittenhouse Square for the owner of the Equitable Trust Company, Louis Cahan.

== See also ==
- National Register of Historic Places listings in Center City, Philadelphia
