= Carskadon =

Carskadon is a surname. Notable people with the surname include:

- Mary Carskadon, American sleep researcher
- Thomas Carskadon (1837–1905), American politician
