= Edward B. Seymour House =

Historic house in Pennsylvania, United States

- U.S. National Register of Historic Places
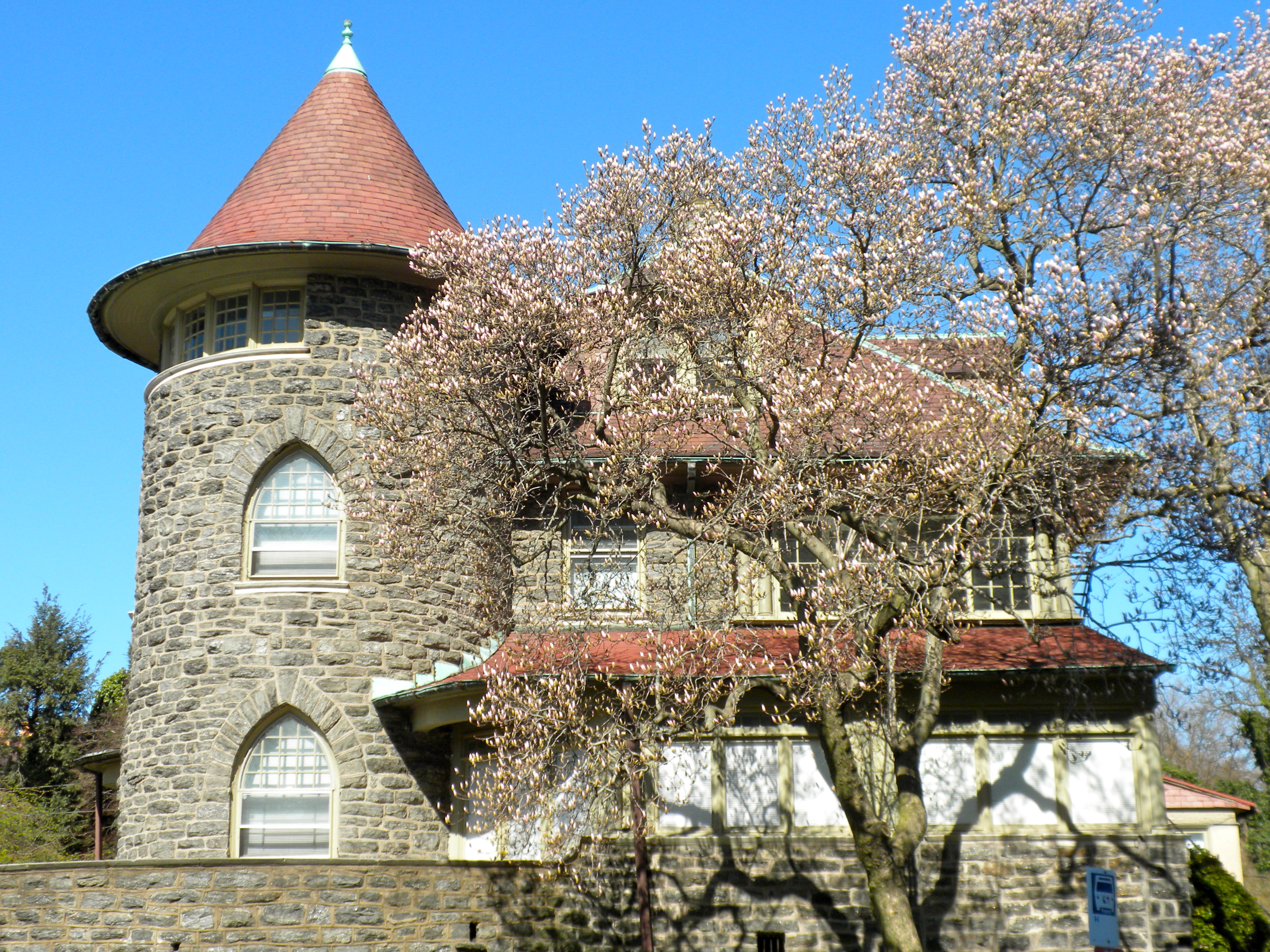
- Edward B. Seymour House, March 2010

- Location within Philadelphia Location within Pennsylvania Location within the United States
- Location: 260 W. Johnson St., Philadelphia, Pennsylvania
- Coordinates: 40°2′28″N 75°11′16″W
- Area: 0.5 acres (0.20 ha)
- Built: 1891, 1909
- Architect: Hazelhurst & Huckel; Fielding, Mantle
- Architectural style: Queen Anne
- NRHP reference No.: 87001945
- Added to NRHP: November 5, 1987

Edward B. Seymour House is a historic home located on the Germantown-Mount Airy neighborhood boundary of Philadelphia, Pennsylvania. It was built in 1891, and is a 2 1/2-story, Wissahickon schist and shingle dwelling in the Queen Anne style. It features a rounded corner tower topped by a conical roof and a stepped gable. The house was designed by gilded age architect, Horace Trumbauer. Also on the property is a contributing garage, built in 1909.

It was added to the National Register of Historic Places in 1987.

== See also ==
- National Register of Historic Places listings in Northwest Philadelphia
