= Jacques Gréber =

French architect

- Born: 10 September 1882; Paris, France
- Died: 5 June 1962 (aged 79); Paris, France
- Occupation: Architect
- Buildings: Rodin Museum in Philadelphia; Esso Tower, La Défense (demolished)
- Projects: Benjamin Franklin Parkway; Greber Plan (Ottawa)

Jacques-Henri-Auguste Gréber (10 September 1882 – 5 June 1962) was a French architect specializing in landscape architecture and urban design. He was a strong proponent of the Beaux-Arts style and a contributor to the City Beautiful movement, particularly in Philadelphia and Ottawa.

External image
- Portrait of Jacques Gréber.

== Early life and education ==
Gréber was born in Paris, the son of sculptor Henri-Léon Gréber, and attended the École des Beaux-Arts in that city. He was a fine student and won several prizes during his training at the École.

== Career ==
Following graduation in 1908, he left for the United States, where American architects who had trained at the École hired him to help design French gardens for the large houses they built in New England. He designed many private gardens in the U.S. These include Harbor Hill (1910) in Roslyn on Long Island, New York for Clarence Mackay with architects McKim, Mead & White); and at Lynnewood Hall (1913) in Elkins Park, Pennsylvania for Peter A. B. Widener (with architect Horace Trumbauer.

His greatest private commission was for investment banker Edward T. Stotesbury at Whitemarsh Hall (1916–1921) in Wyndmoor, Pennsylvania (also with Trumbauer). There he created the unsurpassed American example of a French classical garden in the grand manner of André Le Nôtre.

As his reputation as a landscape architect began to spread, Gréber won his first public commission for the Fairmount Parkway (now Benjamin Franklin Parkway) in Philadelphia. While completing the parkway, he was also commissioned by the French government to make a systematic study of American construction practice. This would form the basis for his influential book Architecture in the United States (French: L'Architecture aux États -Unis)

He returned to France in 1919, where he secured a reputation as one of France's leading urban designers. Gréber was appointed to the faculty of the Institute of Urbanism in Paris and was active in the reconstruction and expansion plans of a number of French cities in the interwar period.

=== World War II ===
During World War II, Gréber remained in Vichy France and became president of the French Society of Urbanists (French: Société française des urbanistes). As a designated spokesperson for the cause of urbanism in France, he contributed to a collection of essays in which he lauded the Vichy government for providing an orderly national planning program and centralized planning institutions. He was a prominent member of the urban planning hierarchy that oversaw the urban renewal projects of the Vichy government, and was appointed as Inspector General for Urbanism (French: inspecteur générale de l'urbanisme) in Northern France, a position requiring the consent of the Nazi Oberfeldkommandantur.

=== Postwar Activities ===
Following the war, Gréber was invited by Prime Minister of Canada William Lyon Mackenzie King to return to Ottawa and continue his work on a master plan for the city and surrounding region that he had started from 1937 to 1939. This would culminate in the General Report on the Plan for the National Capital (1946–1950) or Greber Plan that would reshape the city in the postwar era.

== Major works ==
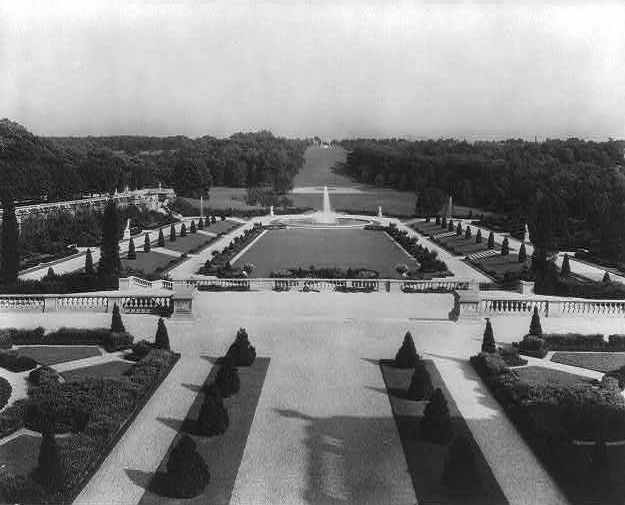
Gardens of Whitemarsh Hall (Edward T. Stotesbury mansion), Wyndmoor, PA (1916–21, demolished 1980). Gréber's mile-long allee, looking east from mansion.

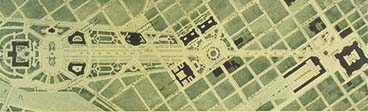
"Plan for the Fairmount Parkway" (1917). Now Benjamin Franklin Parkway, Philadelphia

Gréber is best known for the 1917 master plan for the Benjamin Franklin Parkway in Philadelphia; for his work as master architect for the 1937 Paris International Exposition; and for the Greber Plan for Ottawa and the surrounding National Capital Region. The latter, produced between 1937 and 1950 (with an interruption during the Second World War), included expansion of urban parks, a series of parkways, and a greenbelt surrounding the city. The plan incorporated the construction of a national cenotaph and surrounding plaza area.

In anticipation of the 1926 sesquicentennial of the Declaration of Independence, Gréber created a plan for a mall north of Independence Hall in Philadelphia. This included a "Great Marble Court" surrounded on 3 sides by arcades with each arch representing a U. S. state, and a pavilion at its center to house the Liberty Bell. It was not carried out; Independence Mall was created in the 1950s under a different plan. He also collaborated with fellow French-American architect Paul Cret on Philadelphia's Rodin Museum in 1926. He was not always popular with the press: a Philadelphia newspaper dubbed him "Jack Grabber".

In France, between the world wars, Gréber worked on urban plans in Lille, Belfort, Marseille (1930), Abbeville, and Rouen, Neuilly, Montrouge, among others. But he is not as well-known today in France as he is in North America.

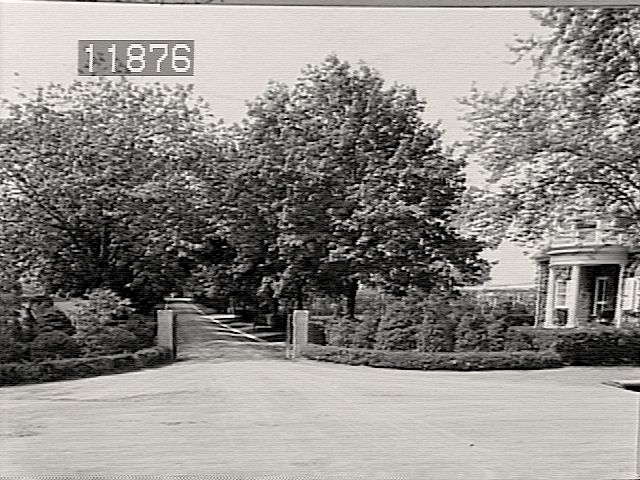
Gardens of Lynnewood Hall (Peter A. B. Widener mansion), Elkins Park, PA (Photo: 1916).

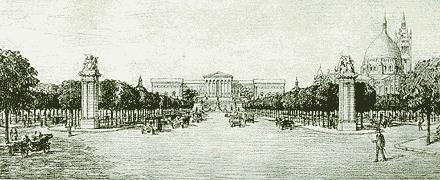
"View to the Museum" (1918). Benjamin Franklin Parkway, looking northwest from 20th Street.

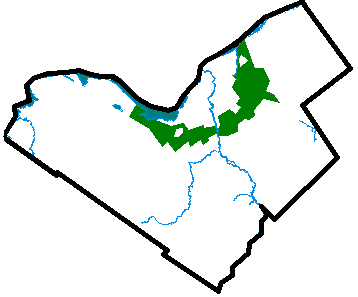
Greenbelt surrounding Ottawa, Ontario (1950).

== See also ==
Media related to Jacques Gréber at Wikimedia Commons

- Greber Plan (Ottawa)
- Gatineau Park
- Greenbelt (Ottawa)
