= Horace Trumbauer =

American architect (1868–1938)

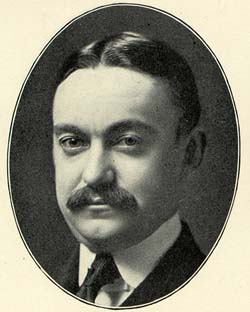
- Trumbauer, c. 1901
- Born: December 28, 1868; Philadelphia, Pennsylvania, U.S.
- Died: September 18, 1938 (aged 69); Philadelphia, Pennsylvania, U.S.
- Occupation: Architect

Horace Trumbauer (December 28, 1868 – September 18, 1938) was a prominent American architect of the Gilded Age, known for designing residential manors for the wealthy. Later in his career he also designed hotels, office buildings, and much of the campus of Duke University.

His work made him a wealthy man, but his buildings rarely received positive critical recognition. Today, however, he is hailed as one of America's premier architects, with his buildings drawing critical acclaim even to this day.

== Early life and education ==
Trumbauer was born in Philadelphia, the son of Josiah Blyler Trumbauer, a salesman, and Mary Malvina (Fable) Trumbauer. He lived in Jenkintown from 1881 until his marriage in 1903. He attended Jenkintown schools and completed a six-year apprenticeship with G. W. & W. D. Hewitt, and opened his own architectural office at age 21 in 1891. He did some work for developers Wendell and Smith, designing houses for middle-class planned communities, including the Overbrook Farms and Wayne Estate developments.

== Career ==
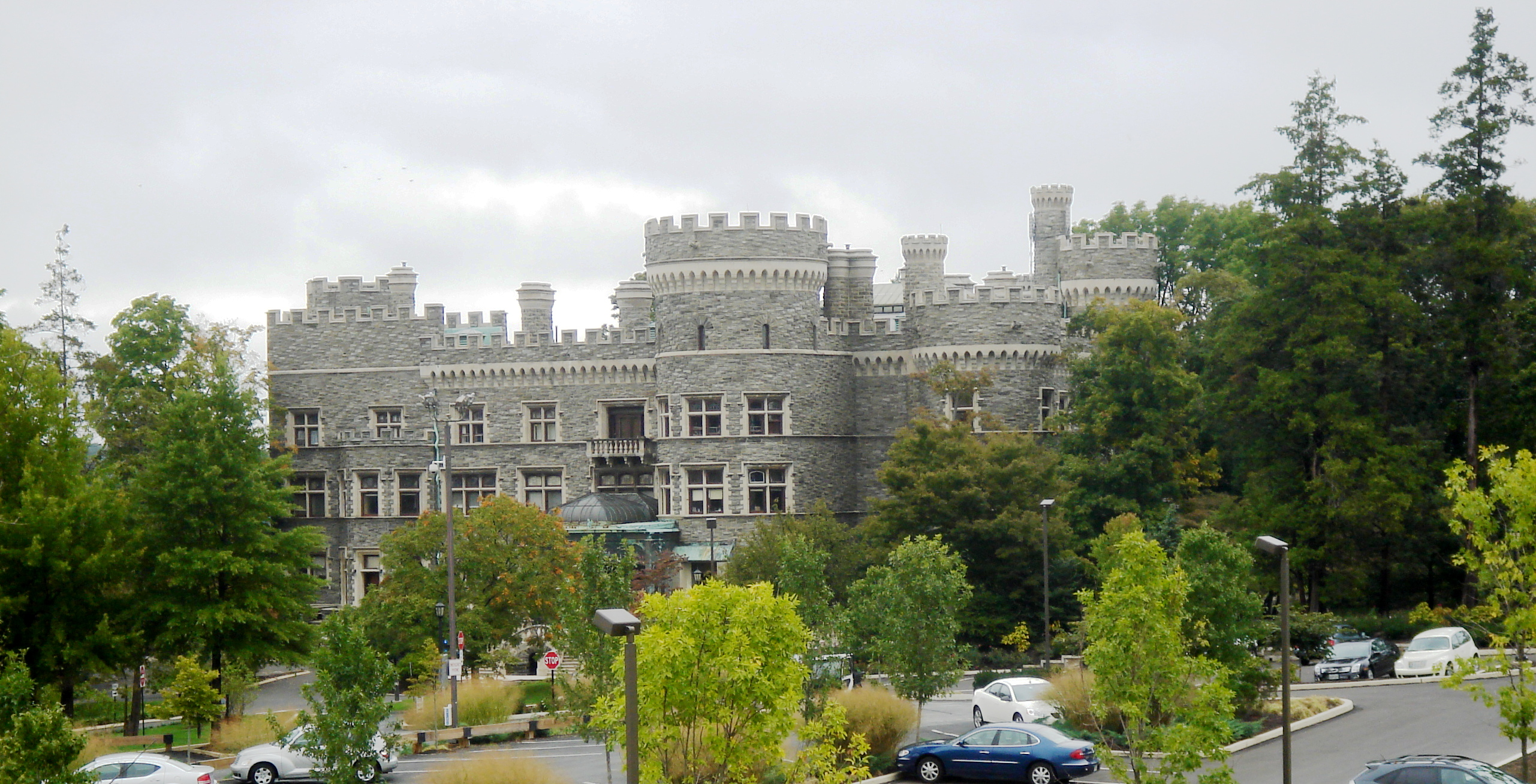
Grey Towers Castle (1893), Trumbauer's first major commission, is the centerpiece of Arcadia University in Glenside, Pennsylvania.

Trumbauer's first major commission was Grey Towers Castle, constructed in 1893, and designed for sugar magnate William Welsh Harrison; its exterior was based on Alnwick Castle in Northumberland, England, but its interiors were French, ranging in style from the Renaissance to Louis XV eras. Harrison introduced him to the streetcar tycoon and real-estate developer Peter A. B. Widener, whose 110-room Georgian-revival palace, Lynnewood Hall (1897–1900), launched Trumbauer's successful career.

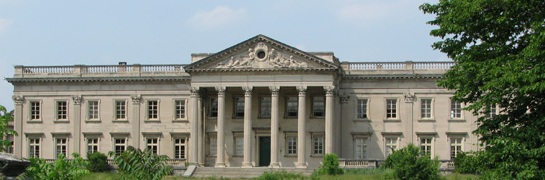
Lynnewood Hall (1897–1900), also known as the Peter A. B. Widener mansion, in Elkins Park, Pennsylvania

For the Wideners, the Elkins, and their circle he designed mansions in Philadelphia, New York City, and Newport, Rhode Island. Through these connections, and others, he designed office buildings, hospitals, and institutional buildings. Known for his academic facility designs, some of his most notable works include commissions for the University of Pennsylvania, Harvard University, Duke University, and others. Harvard University's principal library, the Harry Elkins Widener Memorial Library, was built with a gift from Eleanor Elkins Widener as a memorial to her son, Harry, Class of 1907, an enthusiastic young bibliophile who died in the sinking of the Titanic.

On April 25, 1903, Trumbauer married Sara Thomson Williams and became stepfather to her daughter, Agnes Helena Smith, from her previous marriage to iron dealer C. Comly Smith. Architectural Record published a survey of his work in 1904, less than a decade after his first major commission.

In 1906, Trumbauer hired Julian Abele, the first African-American graduate of the University of Pennsylvania Architecture Department, and promoted him to chief designer in 1909. Many of Trumbauer's later buildings have been attributed to Abele, but without evidence. With the exception of Duke University Chapel (1934), Abele never claimed credit for any of the firm's buildings designed during Trumbauer's lifetime. Abele contributed to the design of more than 400 Trumbauer buildings, including the Widener Memorial Library at Harvard University (1912–15), Philadelphia's Central Library (1917–27), and the Philadelphia Museum of Art (1914–28). He was also the primary designer of the west campus of Duke University (1924–54).

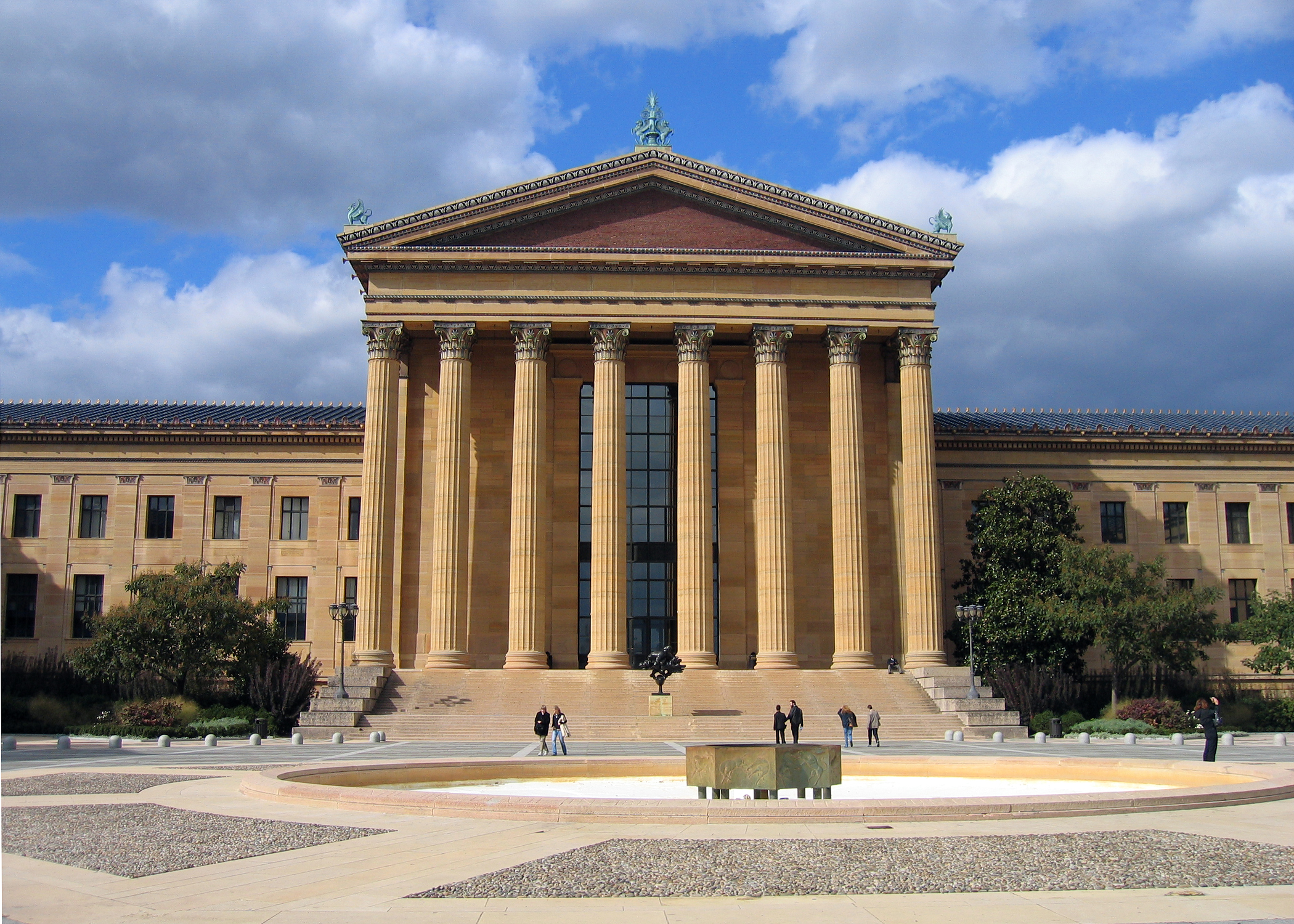
Philadelphia Museum of Art, built between 1916 and 1928, a collaboration between Trumbauer's firm and Zantzinger, Borie and Medary

The commission for the Philadelphia Museum of Art (1916–28) was shared between Trumbauer's firm and Zantzinger, Borie and Medary. Trumbauer architect Howell Lewis Shay is credited with the building's plan and massing, although the perspective drawings appear to be in Julian Abele's hand. When it opened in 1928, the building was criticized as being vastly overscaled and nicknamed "the great Greek garage". But, perched on Fairmount Hill and terminating the axis of the Benjamin Franklin Parkway, it is now considered to be the most magnificently situated museum in the United States.

In 1923, Trumbauer was hired by the Reading Company to design the Jenkintown Train Station. A fine example of Queen Anne revival architecture, it still stands today as the Jenkintown-Wyncote station and was added to the National Register of Historic Places in 2014. His work was also part of the architecture event in the art competition at the 1928 Summer Olympics.

In 1933, Trumbauer was commissioned to build an ornate Ancien-Regime French style mansion for Herbert Nathan Straus, the youngest son of Macy's founder Isidor Straus. Built in limestone with intricate carvings on the façade, the Herbert N. Straus House is now the largest private residence in Manhattan. The mansion exemplifies the classic but opulent style requested of industry barons of that time.

== Death ==
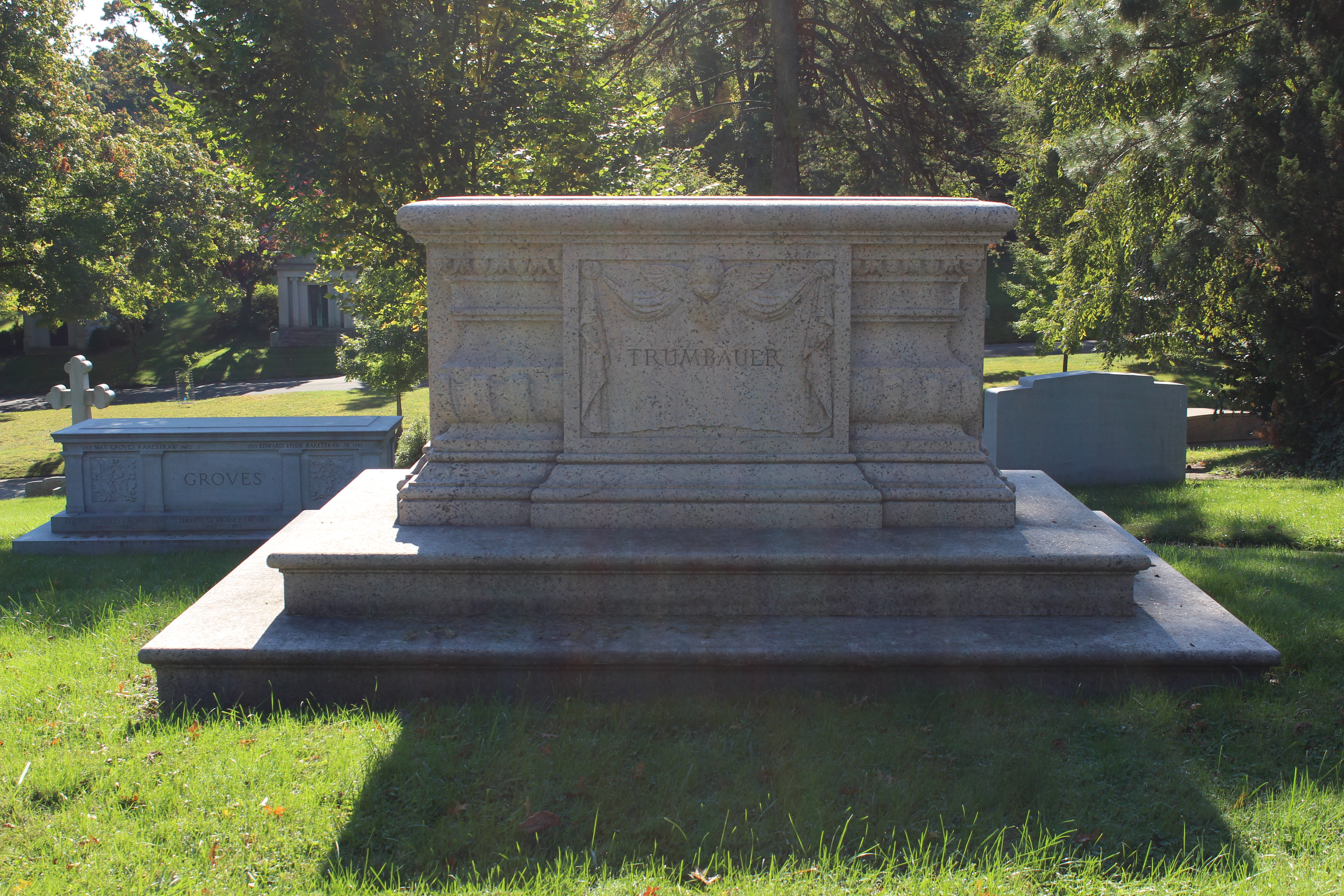
Trumbauer's grave in West Laurel Hill Cemetery in Bala Cynwyd, Pennsylvania

Despite tremendous success and his apparent ability to impress wealthy clients, Trumbauer suffered from overwhelming shyness and a sense of inferiority about his lack of formal education. He had a number of commissions until the Great Depression, but began to drink heavily, and died of cirrhosis of the liver in 1938. He is buried in West Laurel Hill Cemetery in Bala Cynwyd, Pennsylvania.

== Selected buildings ==
=== Philadelphia and its suburbs ===
==== Residences ====
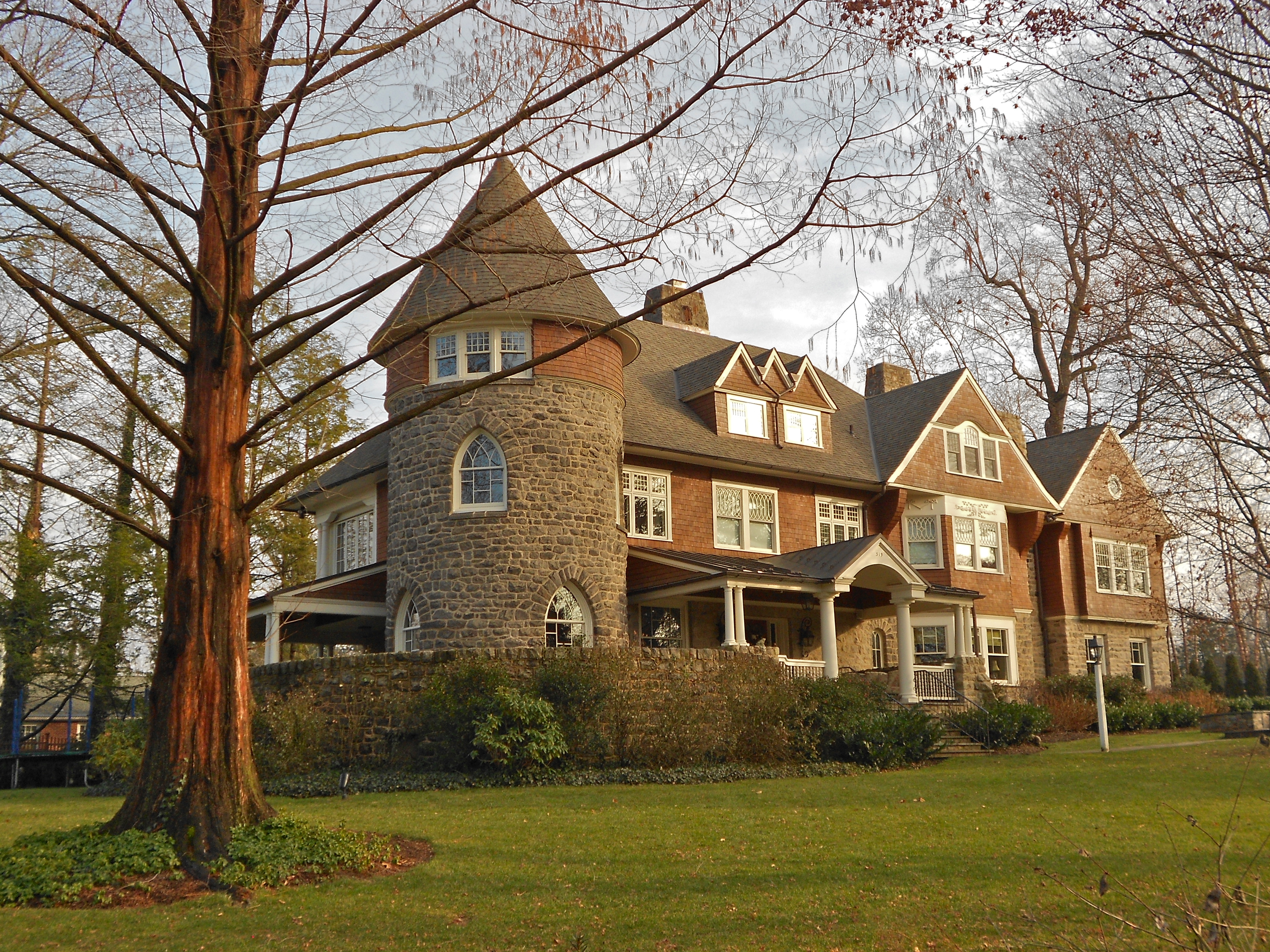
John H. Watt house in Wayne, Pennsylvania (1893)

- Edward B. Seymour House, Philadelphia (1891)
- John H. Watt house ("Tower House"), Wayne, Pennsylvania (1893). Part of Wendell & Smith's Wayne Estate development.
- Grey Towers Castle (William Welsh Harrison mansion), Glenside, Pennsylvania (1893–94)
- Chelten House (George W. Elkins mansion), Elkins Park, Pennsylvania (1896, rebuilt 1909)
- Lynnewood Hall (Peter A. B. Widener mansion), Elkins Park, Pennsylvania (1897–1900)
- J. Harper Smith Mansion, library, Somerville, New Jersey (1898)
- Elstowe Manor (William L. Elkins mansion), Elkins Park, Pennsylvania (1898)
- Edward C. Knight townhouse, 1629 Locust Street, Philadelphia (1902)
- Georgian Terrace (George F. Tyler mansion), Elkins Park, Pennsylvania (1905) (now Stella Elkins Tyler School of Art, Temple University)
- John C. Bell House, Rittenhouse Square, Philadelphia (1906)
- Isle Field (mansion), Villanova, Pennsylvania (1911) (now offices of Agnes Irwin School)
- Ardrossan, Radnor, Pennsylvania (1913)
- Bloomfield, Villanova, Pennsylvania
- Whitemarsh Hall (Edward T. Stotesbury mansion), Wyndmoor, Pennsylvania (1916–21, demolished 1980)
- Ronaele Manor (Fitz Eugene Dixon mansion), Elkins Park, Pennsylvania (1923–26, demolished 1974). Mrs. Dixon was Eleanor Widener; the mansion's name is hers spelled backward. La Salle College Christian Brothers owned the mansion from 1950 to 1974, renaming it Anselm Hall.
- Woodcrest Mansion, 610 King of Prussia Rd. Radnor Township, Pennsylvania (1901 - 1907)
- 141 Pelham Rd., W. Mt. Airy, Philadelphia (source: Germantown Historical Society)
- 209 Pelham Rd., W. Mt. Airy, Philadelphia (source: Germantown Historical Society)
- Katherine Craig Wright Muckl Mansion, 11 Coopertown Rd, Haverford, Pennsylvania (1926)
- Woodburne Mansion (Edgar Thomson Scott Sr. mansion), Darby, Pennsylvania (1906)

==== Commercial ====
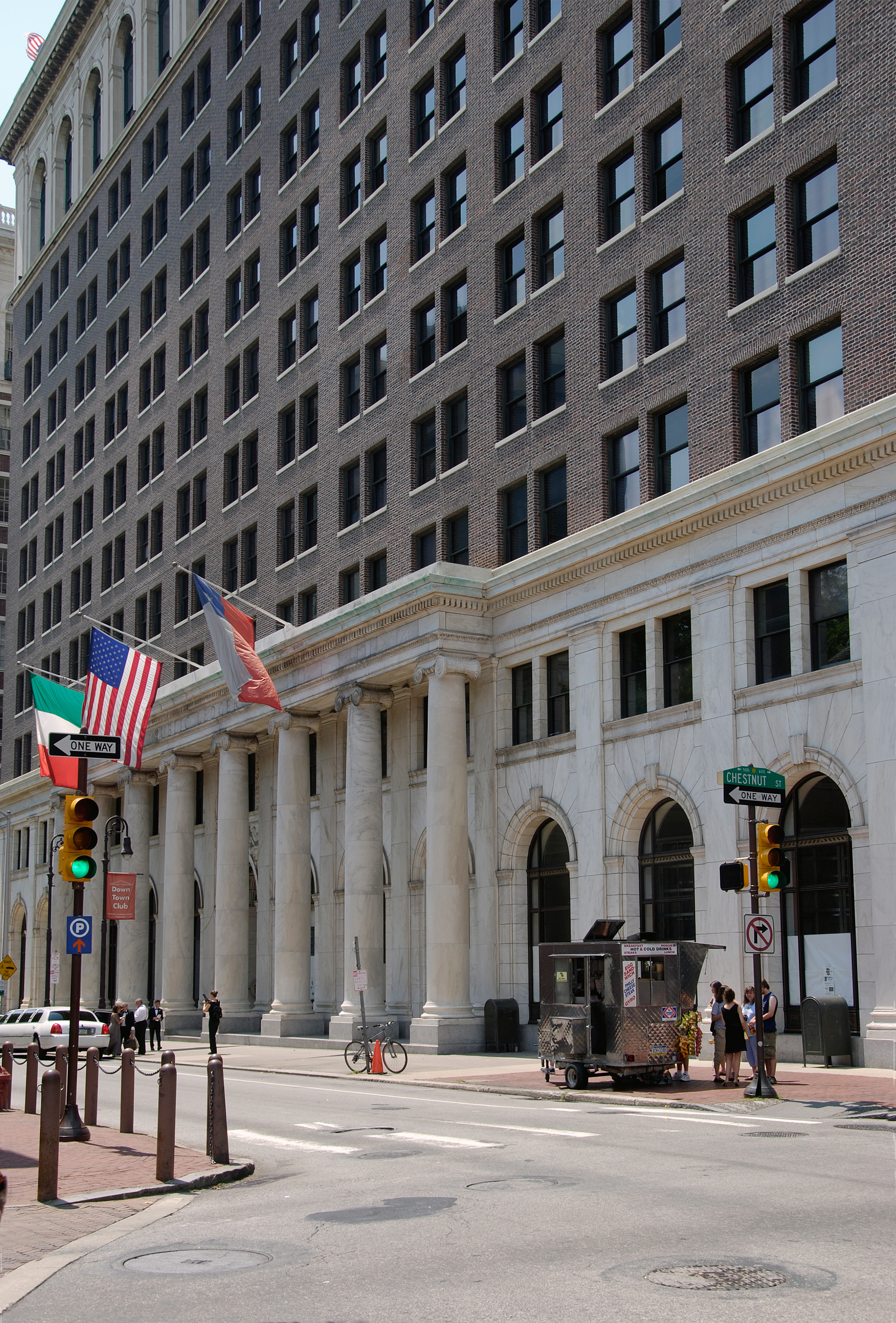
Public Ledger Building in Philadelphia (1921)

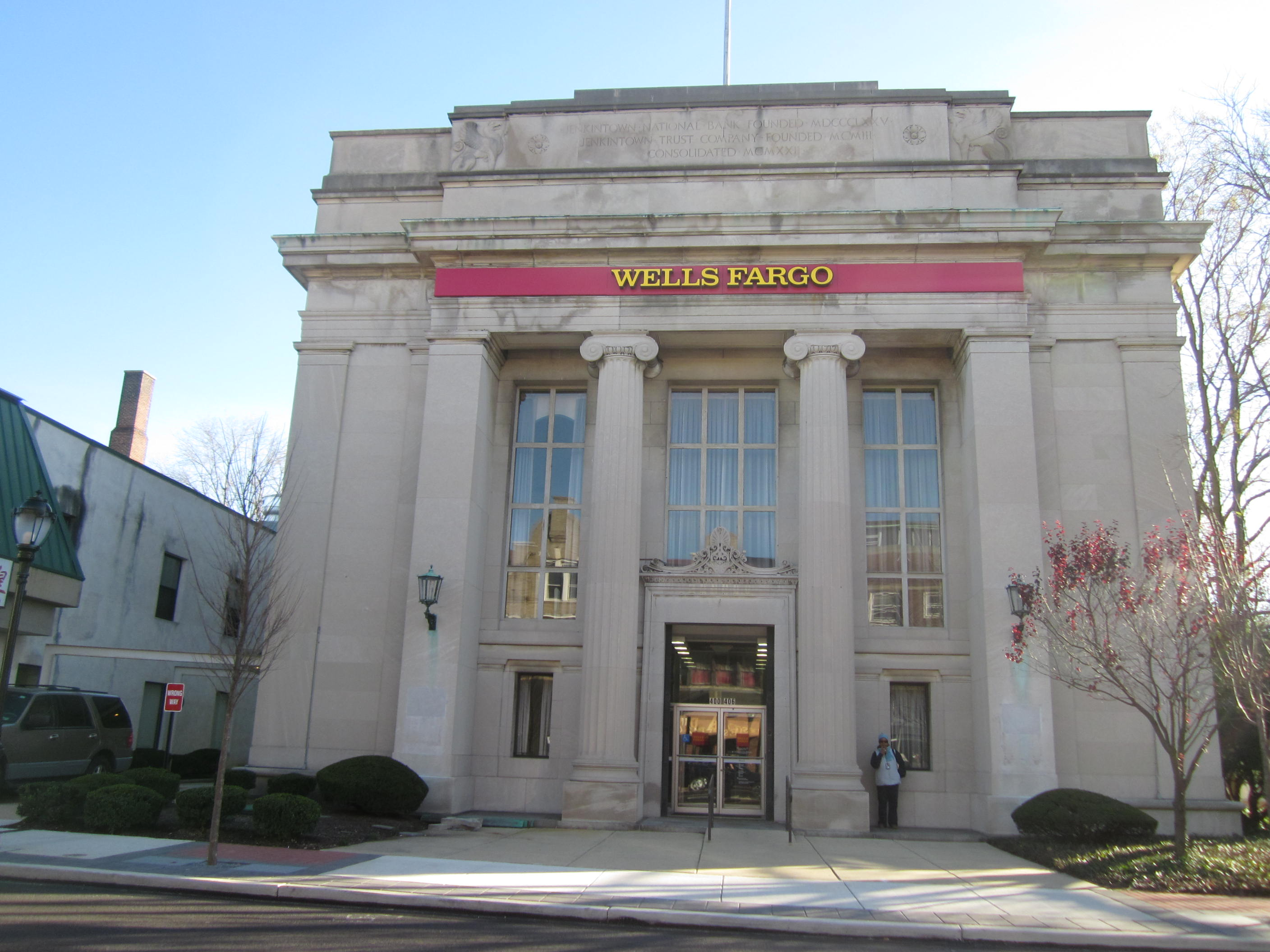
The former Jenkintown Bank & Trust building erected between 1924 and 1925 at the northeast corner of (Old) York Road and West Avenue

- St. James Apartment House, 13th & Walnut Sts., Philadelphia (1901)
- Land Title Building, 100 S. Broad St., Philadelphia (1902)
- Ritz-Carlton Hotel, Philadelphia, SE corner Broad & Walnut Sts., Philadelphia (1911, altered beyond recognition)
- Widener Building, South Penn Square, Philadelphia (1914)
- Adelphia Hotel, 1229 Chestnut St., Philadelphia (1914)
- Beneficial Savings Fund Society Building, SW corner 12th & Chestnut Sts., Philadelphia (1916)
- Bankers' Trust Office Building, 12th & Chestnut Sts., Philadelphia (1922)
- Public Ledger Building, 6th & Chestnut Sts., Philadelphia (1923)
- Jenkintown Bank & Trust, (Old) York Road & West Avenue (1924 & 1925)
- Benjamin Franklin Hotel, 834 Chestnut St., Philadelphia (1925)
- Chateau Crillon Apartment House, Locust St. & Rittenhouse Square West, Philadelphia (1928)
- Jenkintown Train Station, Jenkintown, Pennsylvania (1932)
- Racquet Club of Philadelphia, Philadelphia (1906)
- Equitable Trust Building, 1405 Locust St., Philadelphia (1925)
- North Broad Street Station, Philadelphia (1929)
- Philadelphia Stock Exchange, 1409 1411 Walnut St., Philadelphia (1913)

==== Cultural, medical and educational ====
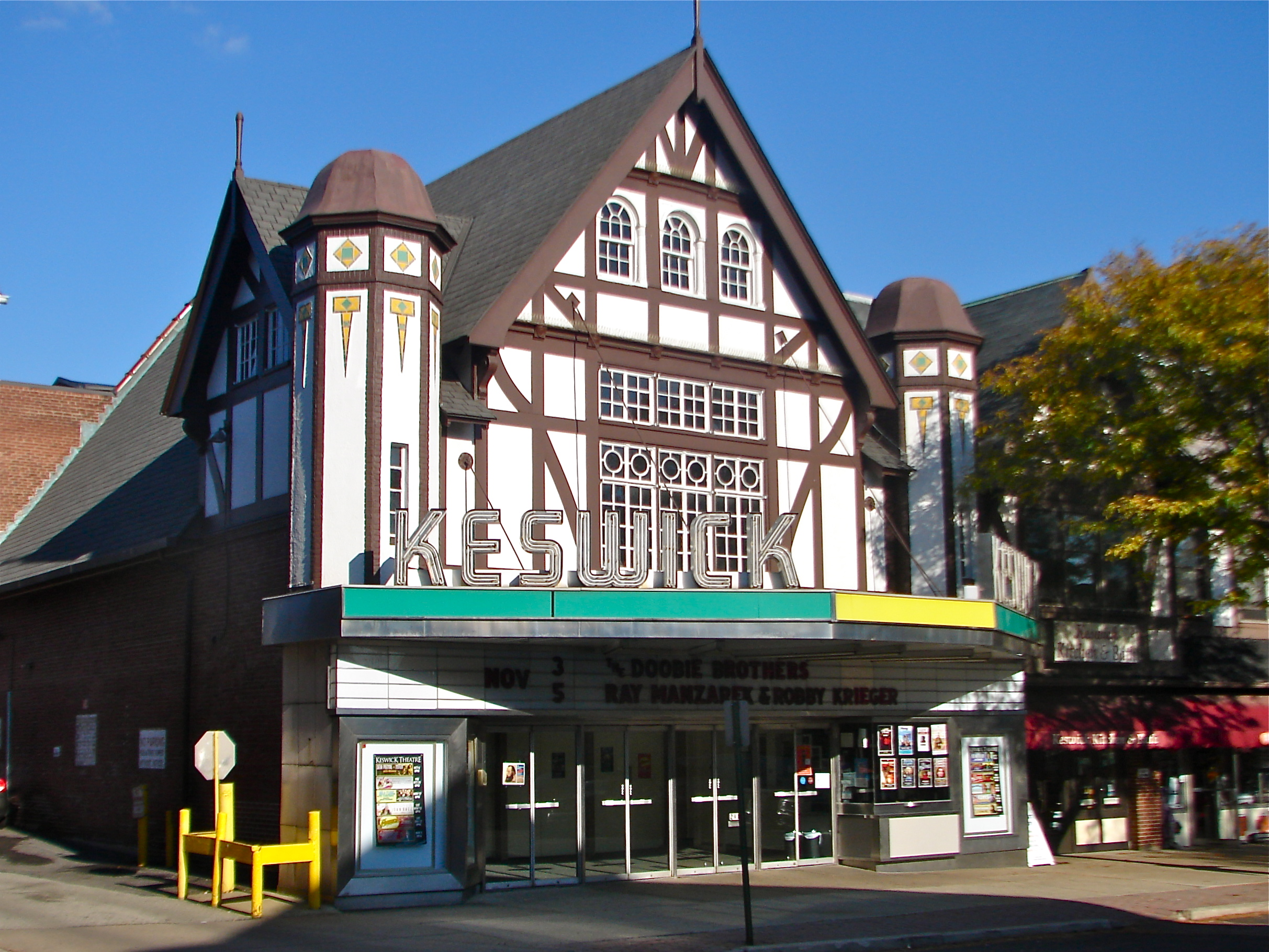
Keswick Theatre in Glenside, Pennsylvania

- Music Pavilion at Willow Grove Park, Willow Grove, Pennsylvania (1895, demolished)
- Bandshell in West Park, Allentown, Pennsylvania (1908–1909)
- Union League of Philadelphia Annex, 15th & Sansom Sts., Philadelphia (1909)
- Elkins Memorial YMCA, Arch St., Philadelphia (1911)
- Philadelphia Racquet Club, 213–25 S. 16th St., Philadelphia (1912)
- Widener Memorial Training School for Crippled Children, 1450 W. Olney Ave., Philadelphia (1912–14)
- Philadelphia Museum of Art (with Zantzinger, Borie and Medary), Philadelphia (1916–28)
- Social Service Building, Philadelphia (1923–24)
- The Free Library of Philadelphia's Parkway Central Library, Logan Square, Philadelphia (1925–27)
- Pedestal for the Statue of Edgar Fahs Smith, Philadelphia (1926)
- Irvine Auditorium, University of Pennsylvania, 34th & Spruce Sts., Philadelphia (1926–32)
- Keswick Theatre, Glenside, Pennsylvania (1928)
- Hahnemann University Hospital South Tower, Philadelphia (1928)
- Jefferson Medical College, Main Building, Philadelphia (1929)
- Jefferson Medical College, Curtis Clinic, 1001–15 Walnut St., Philadelphia (1931)
- St. Paul's Episcopal Church, Old York and Ashbourne Rds., Elkins Park, Pennsylvania (1897-1924)
- West Laurel Hill Cemetery, 227 Belmont Ave., Bala Cynwyd, Pennsylvania

=== Buildings elsewhere ===
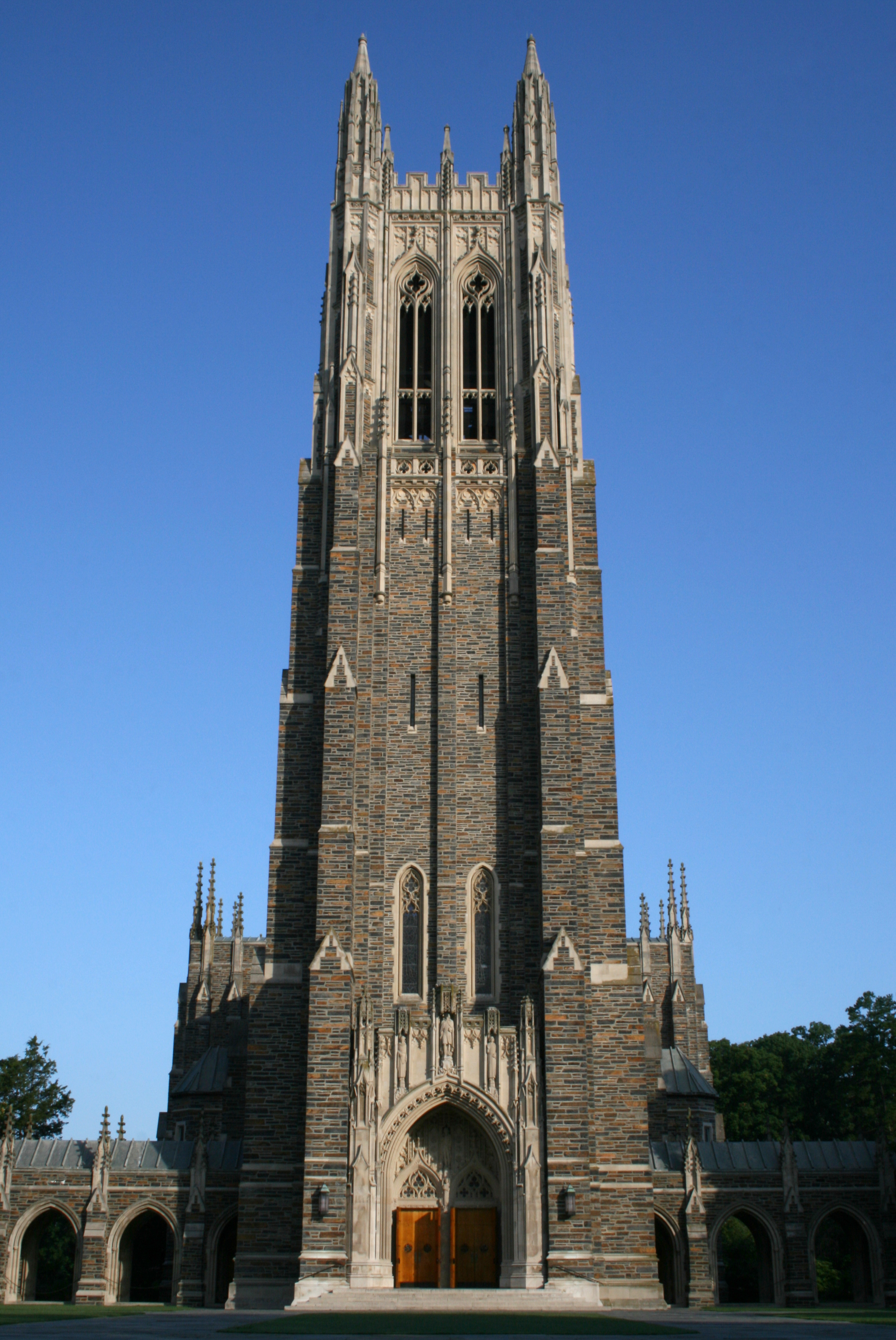
Duke Chapel at Duke University in Durham, North Carolina (1934); Julian Abele is credited with the design.

- St. John's Episcopal Church, Somerville, New Jersey (1895)
- The Elms (Edward Julius Berwind mansion), Newport, Rhode Island (1899–1901)
- St. Catherine Church, Spring Lake, New Jersey (1901)
- The John R. Drexel Mansion, 1 East 62nd Street, New York City (1903)
- Clarendon Court (Edward C. Knight mansion), Newport, Rhode Island (1904)
- Perry Belmont House, 1618 New Hampshire Ave NW, Washington, D.C. (1906–1909)
- El Pomar Estate, Colorado Springs, Colorado (1909–1910)
- Consolidation Coal Company Office Building, Fairmont, West Virginia (1911) (now WesBanco Building)
- Adelaide L. T. Douglas House, New York City (1909–1911)
- James B. Duke House (now Institute of Fine Arts, New York University), New York City (1909–1912)
- High Gate (James E. Watson mansion), Fairmont, West Virginia (1910–1913)
- Miramar (Eleanor Elkins Widener mansion), Newport, Rhode Island (1914)
- Daniel B. Zimmerman Mansion, Somerset Township, Pennsylvania (1915)
- Harry Elkins Widener Memorial Library, Harvard University, Cambridge, Massachusetts (1915)
- New York Evening Post Building, New York City (1926)
- Pere Marquette Hotel, 501 Main St., Peoria, Illinois (1926)
- Shadow Lawn (Hubert Templeton Parson mansion), West Long Branch, New Jersey (1927) (now Woodrow Wilson Hall, Monmouth University)
- Wildenstein Art Gallery, 19-21 East 64th Street, New York City (1932)
- Herbert N. Straus House, 9 East 71st Street, New York City (1932)
- Rose Terrace (Anna Dodge mansion), Grosse Pointe Farms, Michigan (1934, demolished 1976)
- Duke Chapel, Duke University, Durham, North Carolina (1934) (Julian Abele credited as the designer)
- El Mirasol, Palm Beach, Florida (1920)
- Stonybrook, Middletown, Rhode Island (1928)

=== Gallery ===
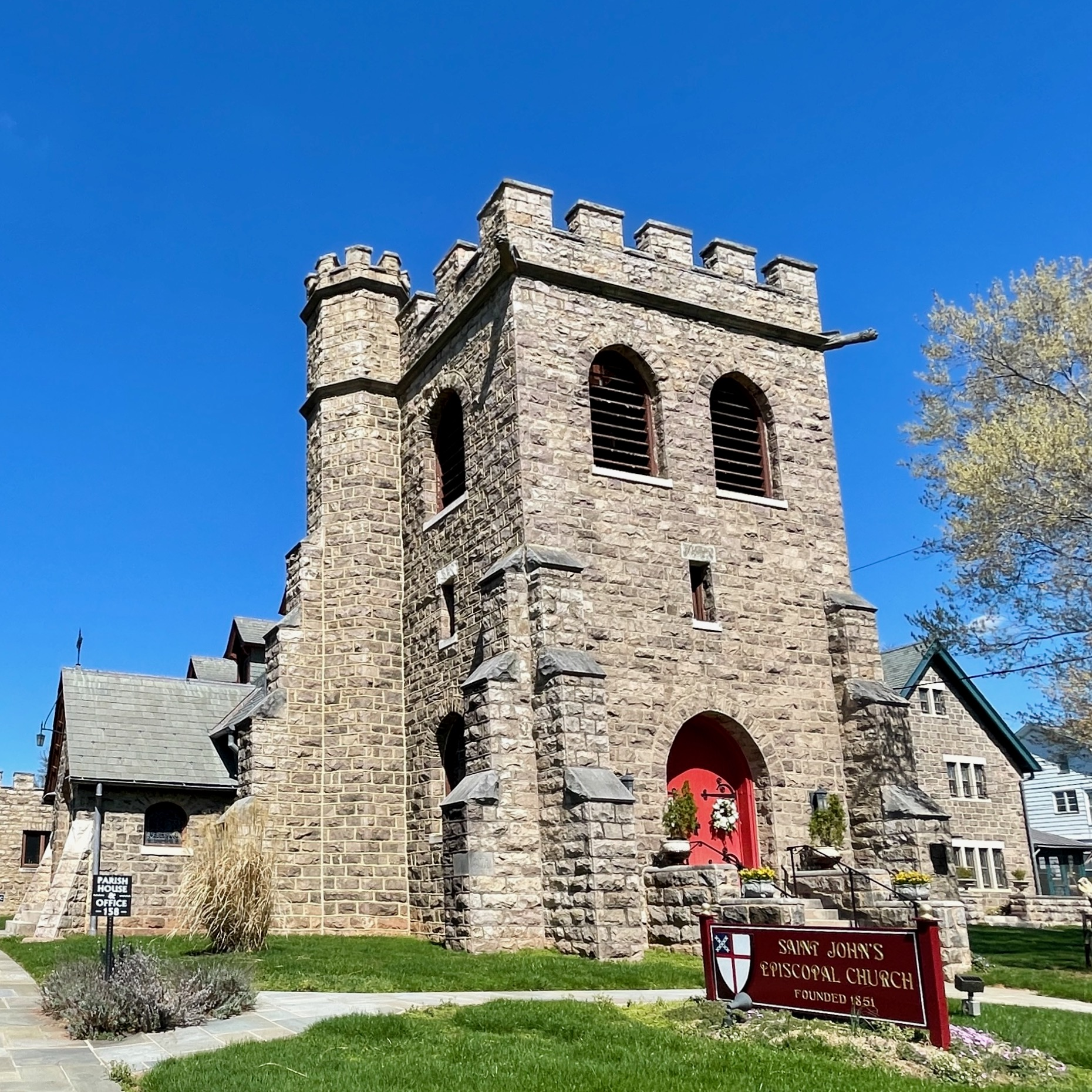
St. John's Episcopal Church, Somerville, New Jersey (1895)

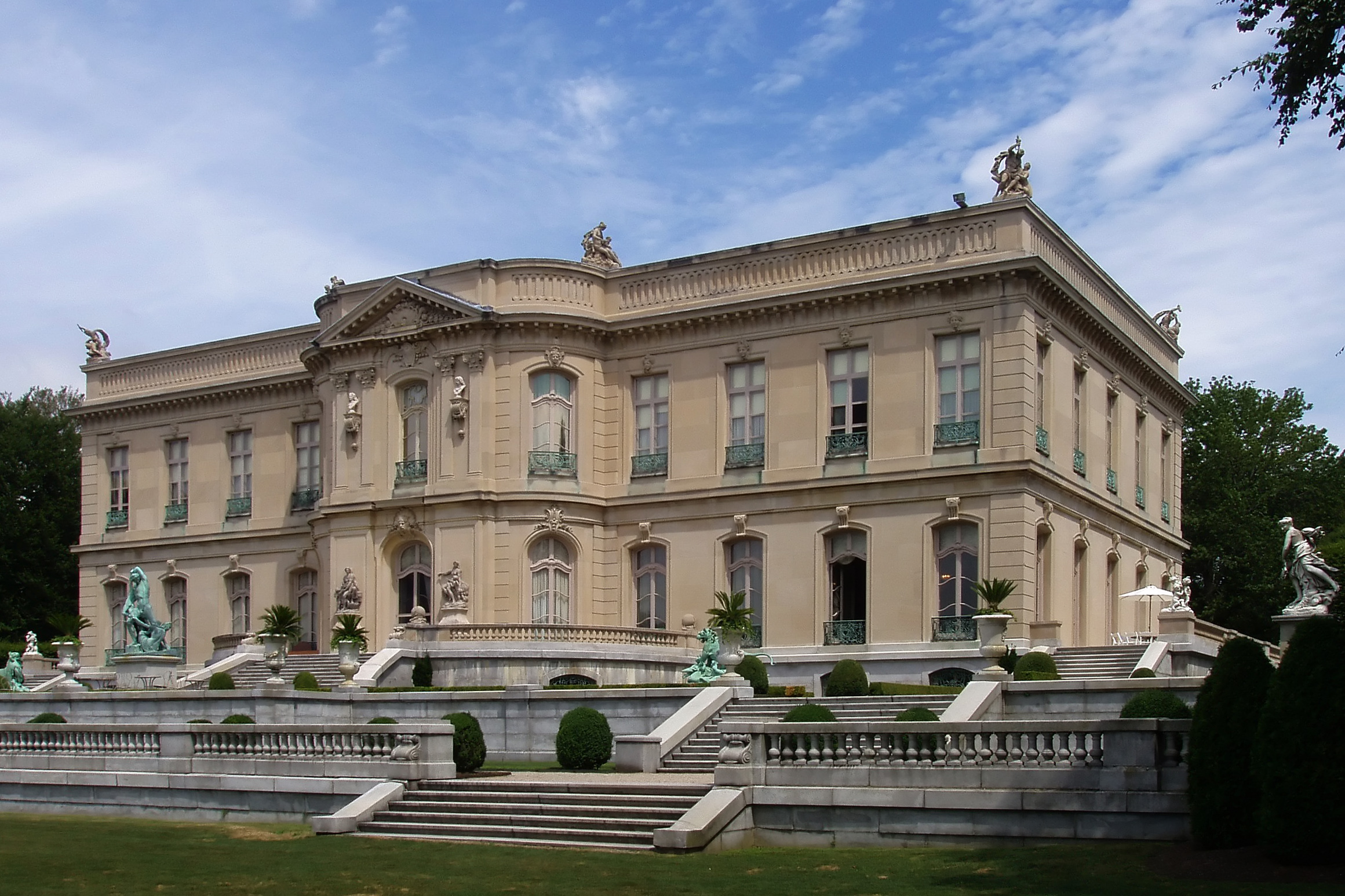
The Elms (Edward Julius Berwind mansion), Newport, Rhode Island (1899–1901)

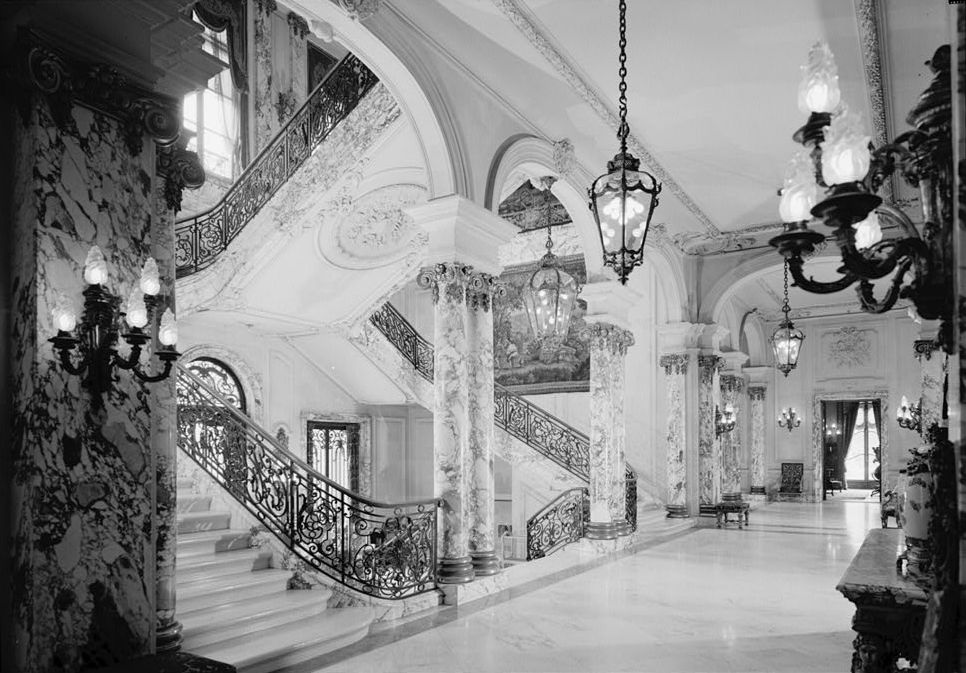
The Elms, Staircase and Entrance Hall

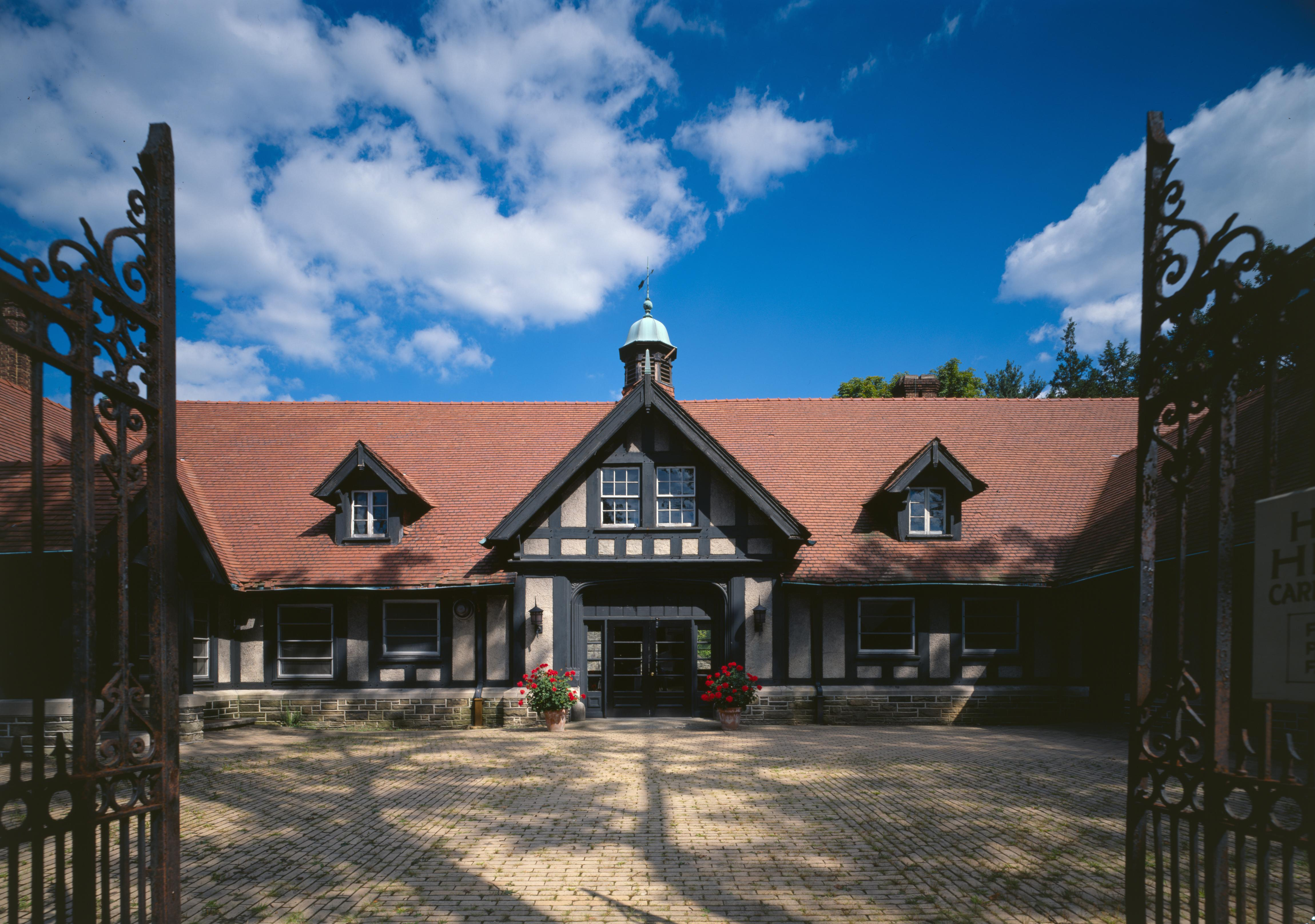
Carriage House from High Gate (James E. Watson mansion), Fairmont, West Virginia (1910–13); the adjacent manor house is now a funeral home.

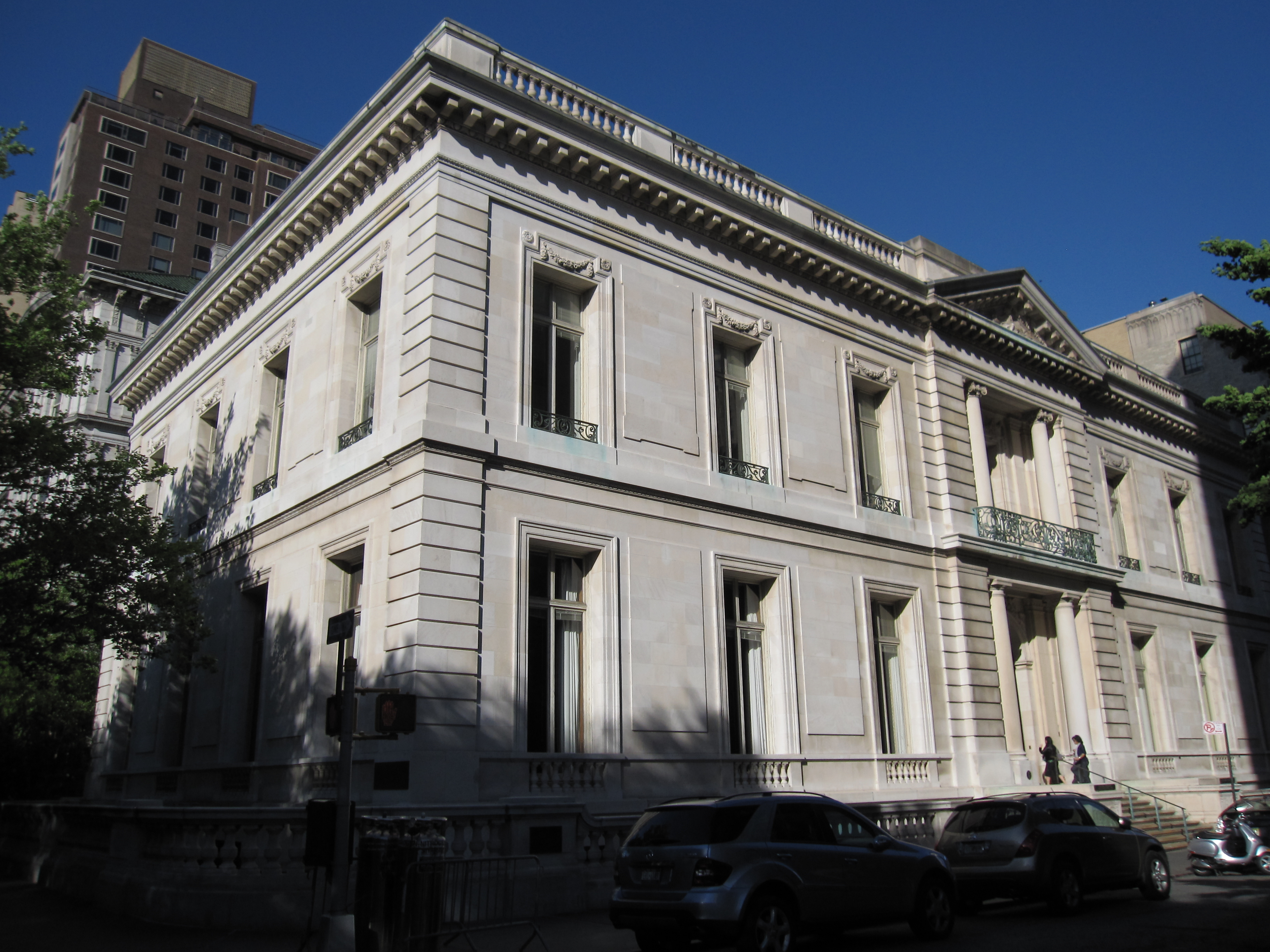
James B. Duke mansion, New York, New York (1912) (now Institute of Fine Arts at New York University)

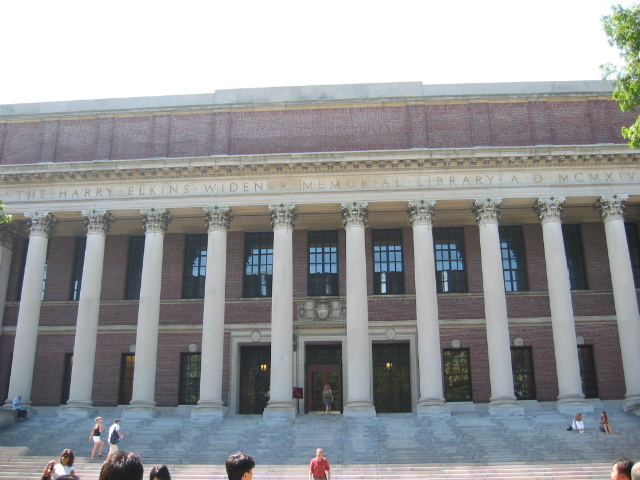
Harry Elkins Widener Memorial Library, Harvard University, Cambridge, Massachusetts (1915)

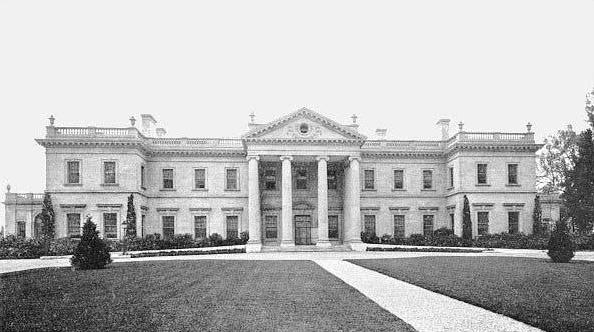
Whitemarsh Hall (Edward T. Stotesbury mansion), Wyndmoor, Pennsylvania (1916–21, demolished 1980)

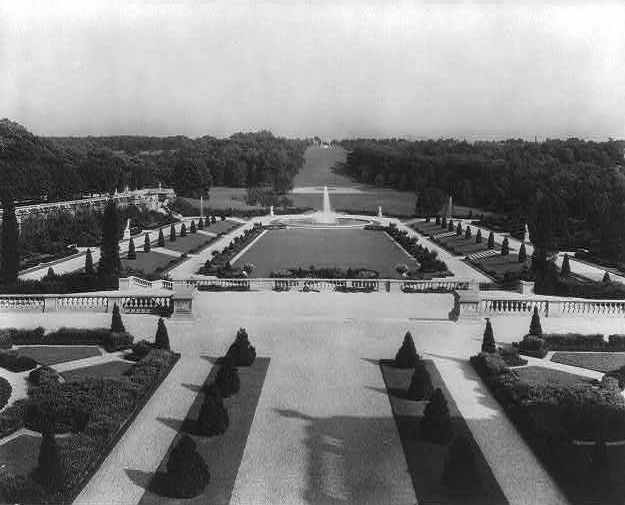
Gardens of Whitemarsh Hall, looking east from Mansion. Jacques Greber designed the gardens, including this mile-long allee. Photo: c. 1922.

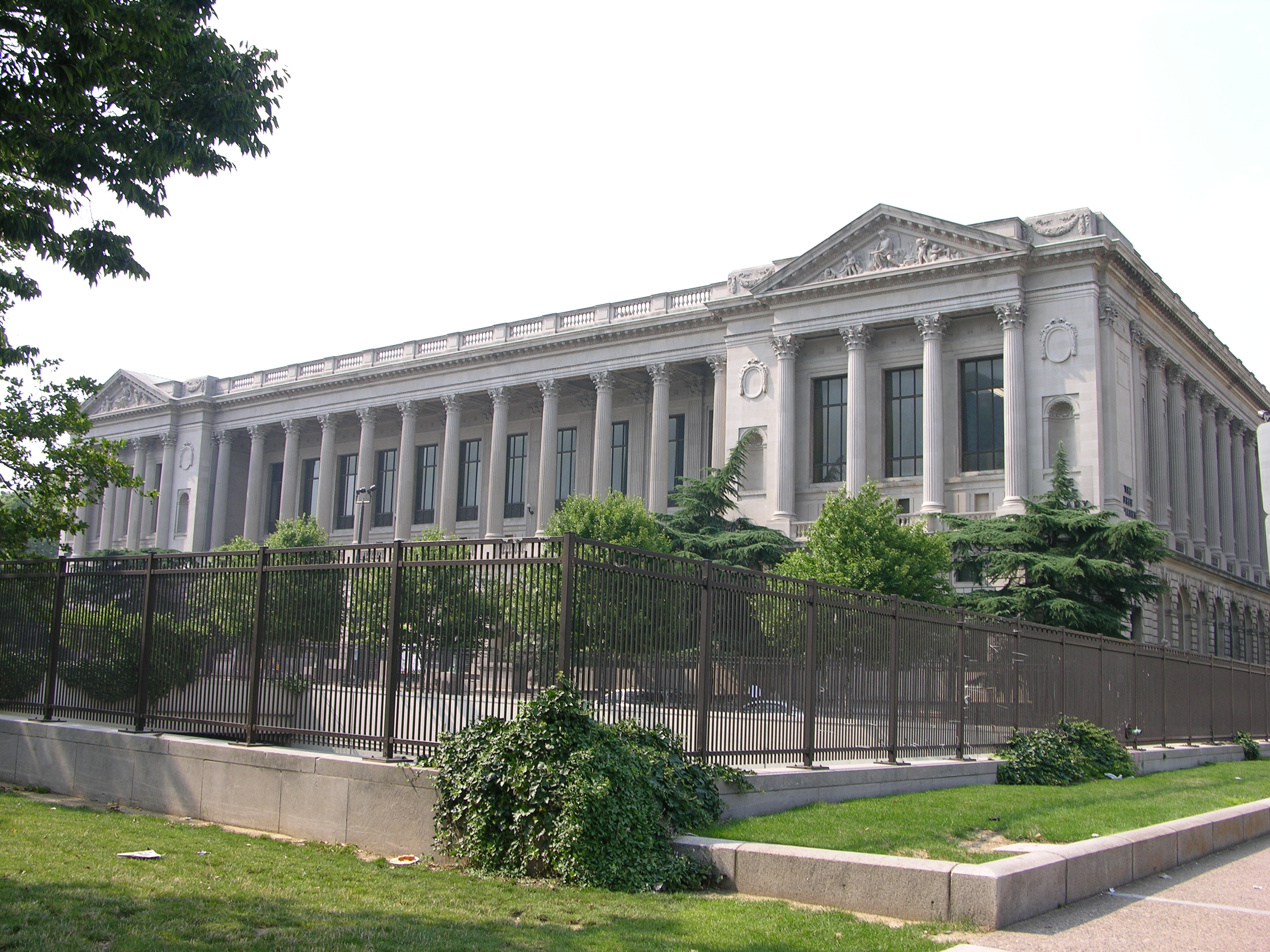
Free Library of Philadelphia, Logan Square, Philadelphia (1925–27)

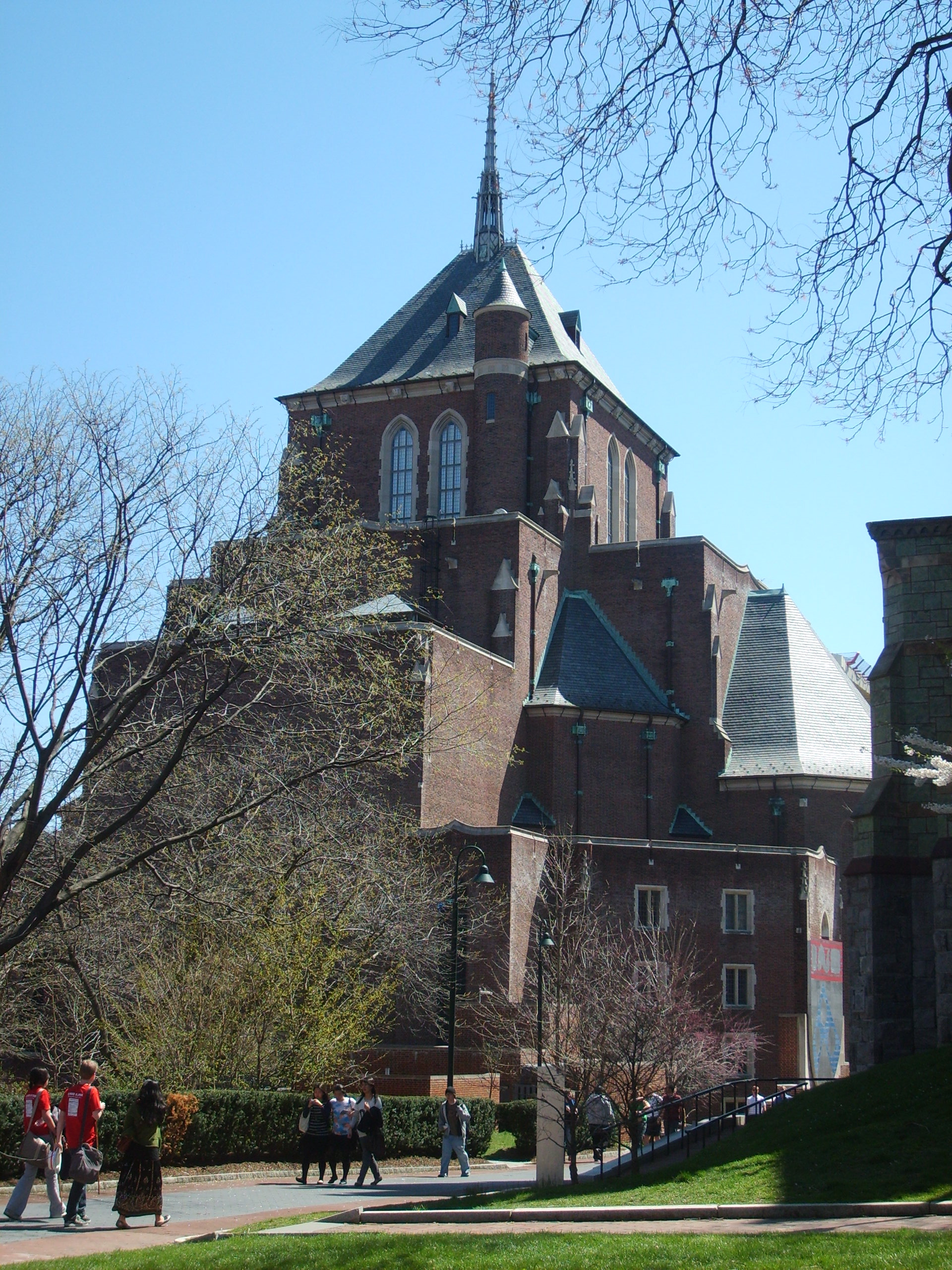
Irvine Auditorium, University of Pennsylvania, 34th & Spruce Sts., Philadelphia (1926–32)

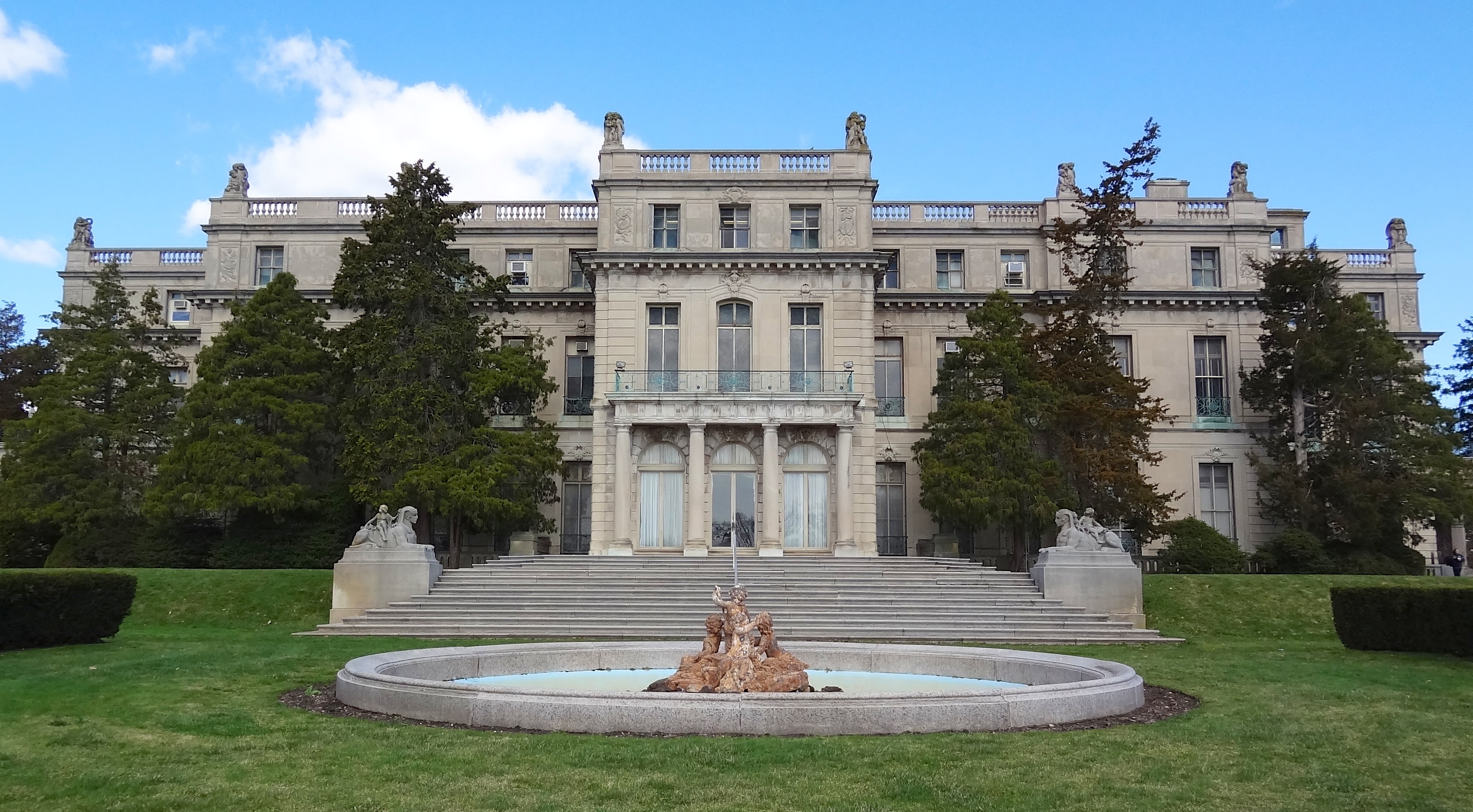
Shadow Lawn (Hubert Templeton Parson mansion), West Long Branch, New Jersey (1927). Now Woodrow Wilson Hall at Monmouth University.

== Bibliography ==
- Kathrens, Michael C. American Splendor: The Residential Architecture of Horace Trumbauer. New York: Acanthus Press, 2002. ISBN 978-0-926494-22-0
