= Social Service Building =

- U.S. National Register of Historic Places
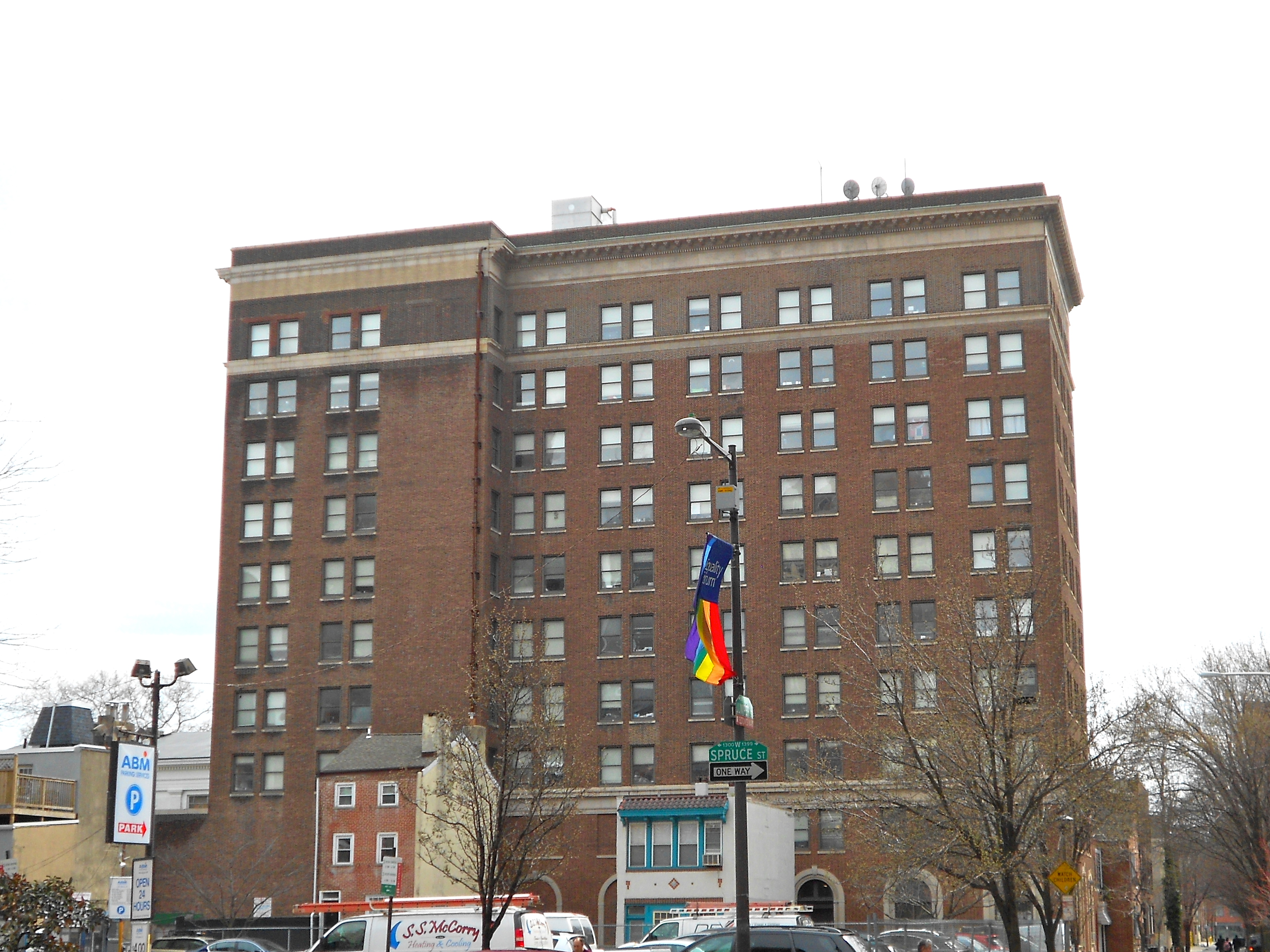
- Social Service Building, April 2014

- Location within Philadelphia Location within Pennsylvania Location within the United States
- Location: 311 S. Juniper Street, Philadelphia, Pennsylvania
- Coordinates: 39°56′45″N 75°9′48″W
- Area: less than an acre
- Built: 1923–1924
- Architect: Horace Trumbauer
- Architectural style: Federal Revival
- NRHP reference No.: 02000063
- Added to NRHP: February 20, 2002

Social Service Building is a historic office building located in the Washington Square West neighborhood of Philadelphia, Pennsylvania. It was designed by noted Philadelphia architect Horace Trumbauer (1868-1938) and built in 1923–1924. It is a 10-story, steel frame brick clad building with limestone and terra cotta ornament in a Federal Revival style. The main entrance features an oversized door with fanlight, framed by Ionic order columns.

It was added to the National Register of Historic Places in 2002.
