= Sonnencroft =

- Interactive map of the Sonnencroft area

General information
- Location: Morgantown Avenue, Fairmont, West Virginia, U.S.
- Coordinates: 39°28′47″N 80°7′52″W
- Year built: 1914
- Owner: Clyde E. Hutchinson

Design and construction
- Architects: Ernest C. S. Holmboe; Robert C. Lafferty

Sonnencroft (also known as the Clyde E. Hutchinson House) was a historic residence located along Morgantown Avenue (near the present site of East Fairmont Junior High School) in Fairmont in the U.S. state of West Virginia.

The fortunes of the coal industry reversed during the Great Depression and in the 1960s the abandoned residence was razed in order for the property to be donated to the Marion County Board of Education.

== Background ==
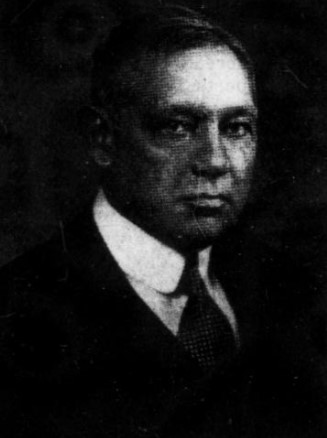
Clyde E. Hutchinson, the original owner of the house

Sonnencroft was owned by Clyde E. Hutchinson, a local coal baron who had made his wealth in the build-up to World War I. In the 1920s, he served as vice-president of the Hutchinson Coal Company. He was an investor in the Sacra Familia Gold Mining which operated a gold mine and Costa Rica's only coal mine at the time.

Clyde E. Hutchinson died on 28 September 1926. He was survived by his wife and sons. In 1941, it was reported that the house had been unoccupied since 1934.

== House ==
Sonnencroft was built in 1914 by the architects Ernest C. S. Holmboe and Robert C. Lafferty, who created its design based on photographs of Inverness Castle in Scotland. The house was given the name Sonnencroft, meaning "house of sons" in German.

The two-storey house was built from stone and steel with a stucco finish, and had three-storey battlementend towers rising from three corners of the building.

== See also ==
- High Gate
