= Thomas Carskadon =

American politician

Personal details
- Born: Thomas Rosabaum Carskadon; May 17, 1837 Keyser, West Virginia, U.S.
- Died: January 21, 1905 (aged 67) Keyser, West Virginia, U.S.
- Party: Prohibition

Military service
- Allegiance: United States of America
- Branch/service: Union Army
- Battles/wars: American Civil War

Thomas Rosabaum Carskadon (May 17, 1837 – January 21, 1905) from Keyser, West Virginia, U.S. had a national reputation as a Prohibition Party leader. He was the Prohibition candidate for Governor of West Virginia in 1884 and again in 1888. He was an influential Mineral County farmer and political leader.

Born on 17 May 1837, Carskadon was a prominent anti-slavery advocate and opponent of Virginia's secession from the Union. In 1861 he was a member of the West Virginia Constitutional Convention, voting in favor of forming West Virginia, where he is thought to have been the youngest member. During that constitutional convention, a Mr. Lamb of Ohio County and Carskadon claimed that in Hampshire County, out of 195 votes only 39 were cast by citizens of the state; the rest were cast illegally by Union soldiers. He briefly fled to Ohio during the war. Abraham Lincoln appointed Carskadon Assistant United States Assessor for West Virginia in 1864, during which he worked towards the establishment of Mineral County in 1866. He was briefly appointed Assessor for the Second District of West Virginia by Andrew Johnson before being removed in 1866. Carskadon campaigned for the selection of Keyser as the county seat. He soon became active in local and state Republican politics, being on the West Virginia Republican Party Central Committee from 1866 to 1879, serving as a presidential elector in the 1868 and 1876 elections, voting for Ulysses S. Grant and Rutherford B. Hayes. He was also a member of the Mineral County Court. Carskadon at one time had been a leading Republican in Hampshire County. He and his wife were strong supporters of the Methodist Church in Keyser; their contributions made it possible for the congregation to build New Creek Station Methodist Episcopal Church.

Between 1889 and 1896 he served on the Mineral County Board of Commissioners. Between 1890 and 1895 he served on the Keyser Town School Board.

Carskadon was a shareholder of the Keyser Land and Improvement Company that sold the plots that would become much of downtown Keyser. In 1888, Carskadon ran for Governor of West Virginia on the Prohibition Party ticket. A newspaper article described his pro-temperance views as unpopular yet voters liked to listen to his "characteristic, sound, humorous, eloquent, and happy speeches, which held his audience spellbound to the close." In 1898, he was nominated as the Prohibition Party candidate for the state senate in the twelfth senatorial district. In 1900, Carskadon put his name in the mix for Vice President on the Prohibition ticket but failed to win the nomination at the national convention. Later that year, he ran again for Governor of West Virginia. After his unsuccessful political bids, he retired to personal life, patenting several designs; among them a collapsible building, a hat, a roofing device, a vehicle standard and a dumping wagon. He also wrote widely on the design of silos and other agricultural reforms. Carskadon was instrumental in the creation of South Keyser, serving as its first mayor before his death in 1905.

The Thomas R. Carskadon House is listed on the National Register of Historic Places.
