= Henri-Léon Gréber =

French sculptor

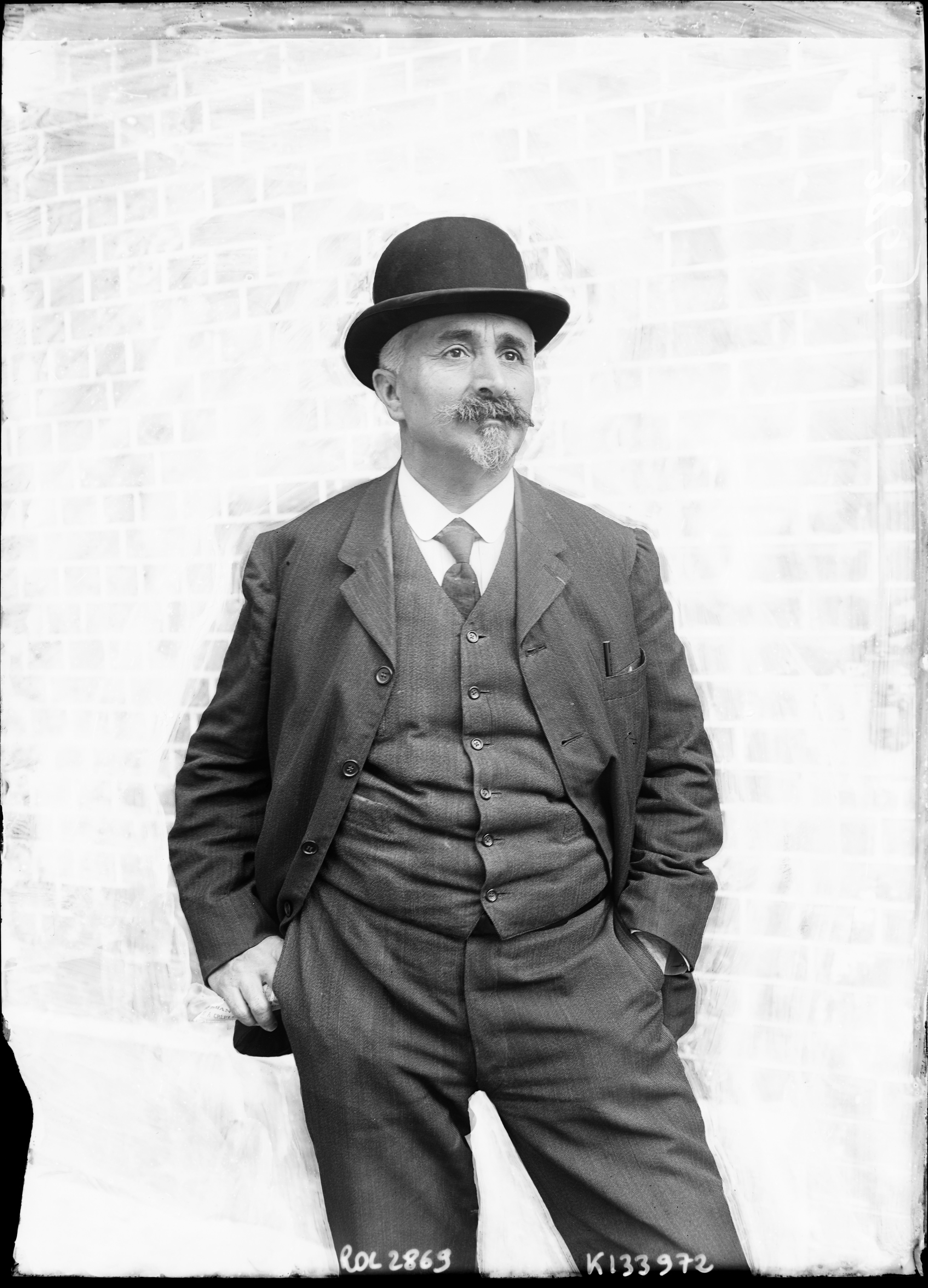
Gréber in 1908

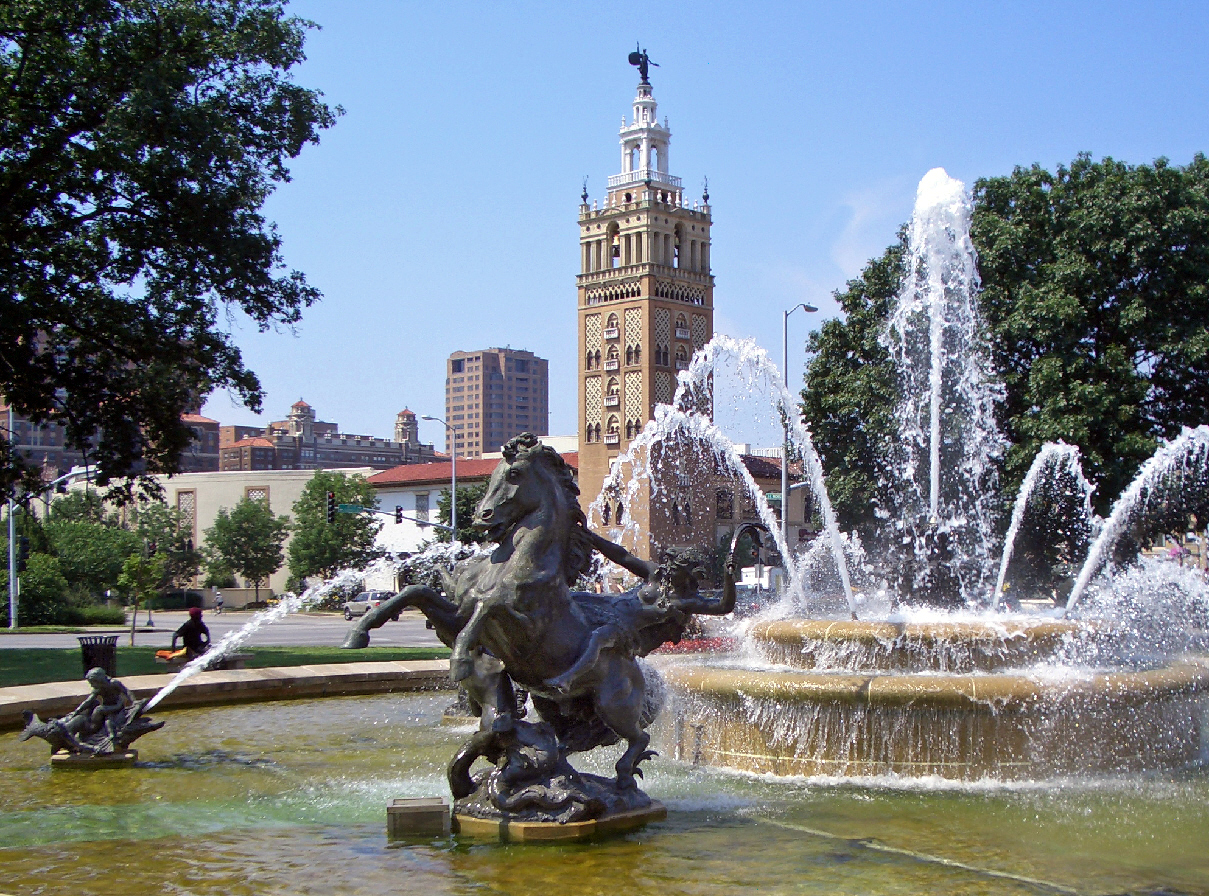
J.C. Nichols Memorial Fountain by Henri-Léon Gréber in Kansas City, Missouri

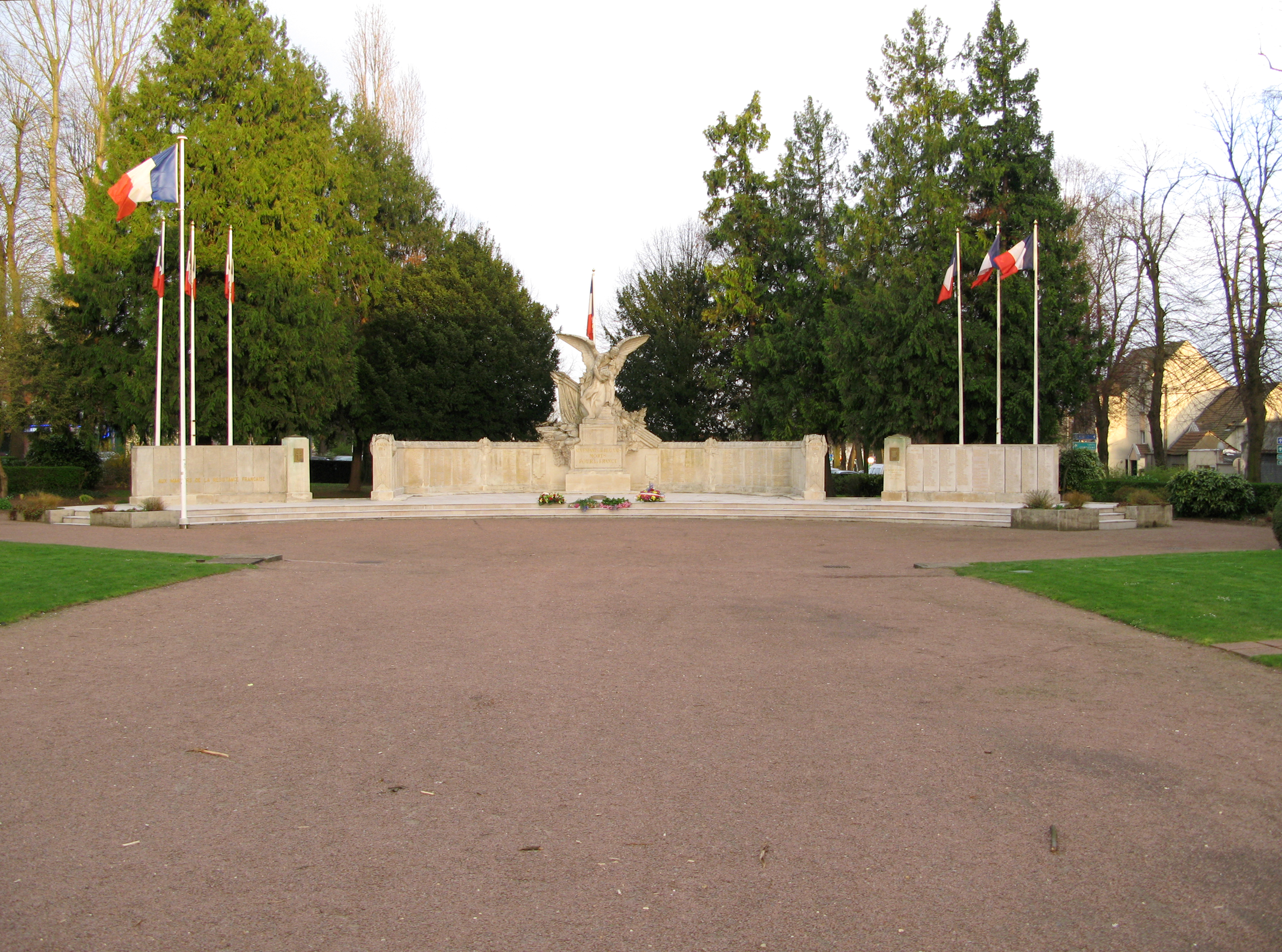
The WWI monument aux morts by Henri-Léon Gréber at Beauvais (Oise), France

Henri-Léon Greber (28 May 1854 – 4 June 1941) was a French sculptor, and medallist. His son was the architect Jacques Gréber. Active in the United States, he produced a fountain sculpture of four equestrian statues for Harbor Hill in 1910, (restored in 1957 and installed at Mill Creek Park, adjacent to the Country Club Plaza in Kansas City, Missouri) and the copy of The Kiss in the Philadelphia Rodin Museum.

== Famous works ==
- Monument aux morts (Oise)
- The Dancing Sprites is a bronze sculpture created in 1900. It is in the middle of a concrete base that forms the centre of a fountain. It can be found on California Street of Huntington Park at the top of Nob Hill in San Francisco. It was donated to the city by Mrs. James Flood in 1942 and is owned by the San Francisco Arts Commission. The sculpture features three nude children with a ribbon draped around them. They are holding hands and dancing in a circle.
- The Mill Creek Park Fountain (previously titled the J.C. Nichols Memorial Fountain) is located at Emanuel Cleaver II Blvd and Mill Creek Parkway, at the east entrance of the popular Country Club Plaza district in Kansas City, Missouri. The fountain is the most famous and most-photographed fountain in Kansas City. The four equestrian statues, four children and fish statues wheat statue (in the center) were sculpted in 1910 to adorn the Harbor Hill mansion of Clarence Mackay, an American financier, in Long Island, New York. The fountain was vandalized and parts of it went missing. In 1951, the Nichols family initiated the purchase and installation of the fountain, which was funded by not only the family, but also Kansas City as well as private contributions including a collection by Kansas City area school children. It was refurbished by Herman Frederick Simon and dedicated in 1960 as the J. C. Nichols Memorial Fountain. It has four heroic equestrians that have been rumoured to represent the four mighty rivers: the Mississippi River (fighting an alligator), the Seine, the Rhine, and the Volga River (with the bear). In 2014, the fountain underwent an extensive renovation funded by the Miller Nichols Charitable Foundation. In the summer of 2020, the Kansas City community called for a title change to no longer celebrate J.C. Nichols based on the fact that he had included redlining rules in the covenants for his housing developments. The massive 80 foot wide fountains title is the Mill Creek Park Fountain.
