= High Gate =

Historic house in West Virginia, United States

- U.S. National Register of Historic Places
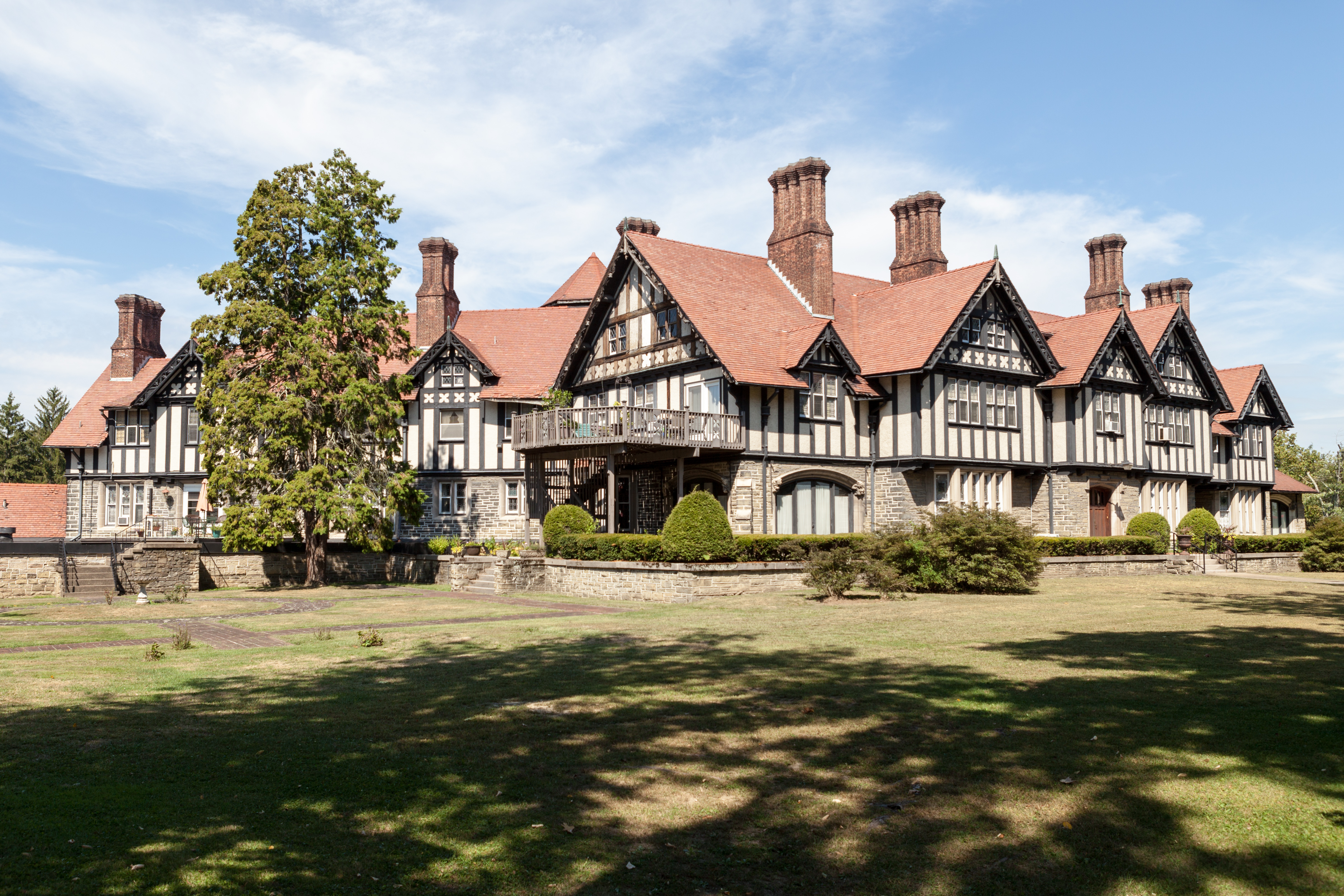
- The main house, looking Looking northwest from Fairmont Avenue

- Location within West Virginia Location within the United States
- Location: 801 Fairmont Ave., Fairmont, West Virginia United States
- Coordinates: 39°28′29″N 80°9′10″W
- Area: 4.5 acres (1.8 ha)
- Built: 1910-12
- Architect: Horace Trumbauer
- Architectural style: Tudor revival
- NRHP reference No.: 82004326
- Added to NRHP: 1982

High Gate (also known as the James Edwin Watson House or Ross Funeral Home) is an historic residence located at 800 Fairmont Avenue in Fairmont, West Virginia.

The High Gate house and carriage house were built ca. 1910-1913 by Fairmont industrialist and financier, James E. Watson, son of the "father of the West Virginia coal industry," James O. Watson. Designed by Philadelphia architect Horace Trumbauer, the stable and the adjacent mansion remain fine example of Tudor revival architecture with half-timbering, stucco wall cladding and clay-tiled-roofs—an academic style based upon late Medieval English prototypes that was common among suburban domestic architecture in the United States in the early-20th-Century.

Although still uncommon prior to World War I, Tudor Revival became an immensely popular style during the 1920s and 1930s. High Gate is clearly a product of the early infusion of the Tudor style, as well as the opulence of the wealthy of the early 20th-Century.

== Historic preservation and restoration ==
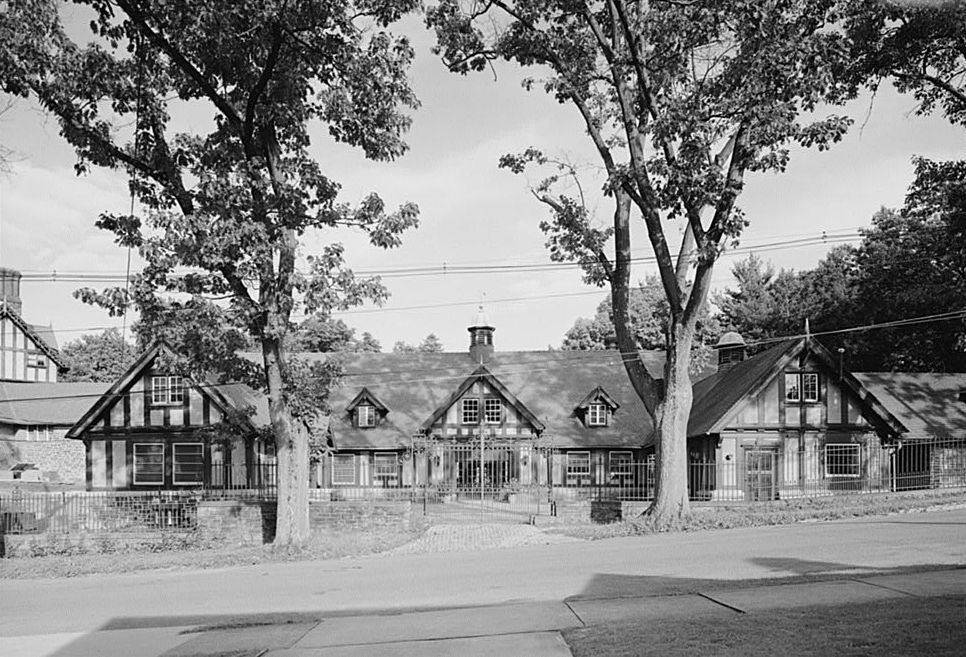
High Gate Carriage House (1910-13), Horace Trumbauer, architect.

In 2002, the Vandalia Heritage Foundation partnered with Friends of High Gate, to ensure continued preservation and restoration of the Carriage House and Gardens. Vandalia Heritage Foundation aims to enhance use of the Carriage House and Gardens and facilitate restoration of the second floor of the building, to be utilized for office space. Upon completion of the second-floor restoration, Vandalia should be able to "Keep the Gates Open," preserving a significant National Historic Landmark in West Virginia's history, and an important moment in the local history of Fairmont.

== See also ==
- List of Registered Historic Places in West Virginia
- Sonnencroft
