= Chateau Crillon Apartment House =

- U.S. National Register of Historic Places
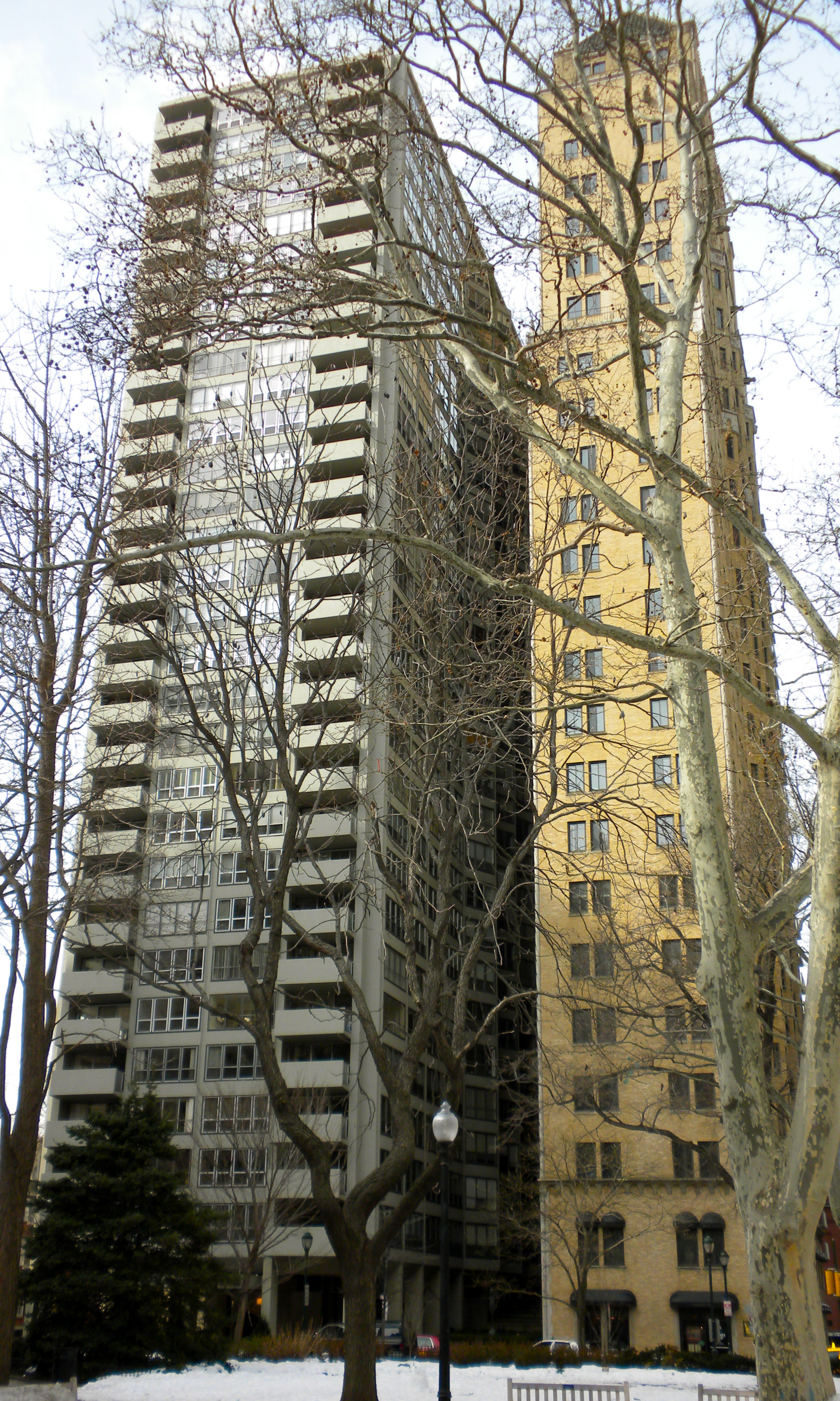
- The Chateau Crillon Apartment House is the building on the right.

- Location within Philadelphia Location within Pennsylvania Location within the United States
- Location: 222 S. 19th St., Philadelphia, Pennsylvania
- Coordinates: 39°56′54″N 75°10′21″W
- Area: 0.3 acres (0.12 ha)
- Built: 1928
- Architect: Horace Trumbauer
- Architectural style: Lombardic Romanesque
- NRHP reference No.: 78002443
- Added to NRHP: April 25, 1978

The Chateau Crillon Apartment House, also known as the Cohen Apartment House and the Rittenhouse 222 Apartments, is a historic high-rise building in the fashionable Rittenhouse Square section of Philadelphia, Pennsylvania, United States.

The 27-story building was designed by architect Horace Trumbauer in the Lombardic Romanesque style and completed in 1928. The style was perhaps suggested by the newly built Shelton Hotel in New York City, designed by A. L. Harmon. There are setbacks on the 17th and 24th floors. The developer was Louis H. Cahan, who also built the Locust Street Theater building at Broad & Locust Sts., The Mitten Building (now The Philadelphia Building) at Juniper and Walnut Sts., and The Mayfair House in the Germantown section of Philadelphia.

It was listed on the National Register of Historic Places in 1978, and on the Philadelphia Register of Historic Places on May 6, 1982, and on February 8, 1995.
