= Road Show (musical) =

Musical by Stephen Sondheim

- Cover art of 2008 Off-Broadway cast recording
- Music: Stephen Sondheim
- Lyrics: Stephen Sondheim
- Book: John Weidman
- Basis: Adventures of Addison Mizner and Wilson Mizner
- Productions: 2003 Chicago; 2003 Washington, D.C. 2008 Off-Broadway; 2011 West End; 2019 Off-Broadway; 2024 Off-West End

Bounce
- Cover art of 2003 original cast recording

Road Show (previously titled Bounce, Wise Guys, and Gold!) is a musical with music and lyrics by Stephen Sondheim and a book by John Weidman. It tells the story of Addison Mizner and his brother Wilson Mizner's adventures across America from the beginning of the twentieth century during the Klondike gold rush to the Florida real estate boom of the 1920s. The musical takes considerable liberties with the facts of the brothers' lives.

The history and evolution of the show are extraordinarily complex, with numerous different versions and recordings. After a 1999 workshop in New York City, the musical was produced in Chicago and Washington, D.C. in 2003 under the title Bounce. Although it did not achieve much success, it is notable due to its status as the last collaboration between writer-director duo Stephen Sondheim and Harold Prince. A revised version of the musical premiered Off-Broadway in New York in October 2008 where the show was redubbed Road Show to better reflect the show's story and themes.

== Synopsis ==
This is a synopsis of the current version of Road Show used since the 2008 Off-Broadway Production.

After the 1933 death of Addison Mizner, people who knew him, including his estranged lover Hollis Bessemer, comment on his life and the way he squandered his talents ("Waste"). Addison's younger brother Wilson appears and speaks to Addison, who angrily claims that Wilson was the cause of all his failures. The time shifts to Papa Mizner's death in California at the beginning of the twentieth century. On his deathbed, Papa charges his sons with the task of using their gifts to shape America ("It's In Your Hands Now"), telling them that there's a "road" to follow. Mama Mizner reveals the family's wealth has been eaten away by Papa's long illness and advises the boys to seek gold in Alaska; Addison is reluctant, but goes along with Wilson anyway ("Gold!").

In the Klondike, the brothers share a sleeping bag and reminisce about their childhood ("Brotherly Love"). Wilson leaves to get supplies while Addison works the claim. Wilson is lured into a game of poker. Addison is shocked to discover his brother gambling. Wilson explains his newfound love of taking risks regardless of what's at stake ("The Game"). Wilson stakes their gold claim in a poker game and wins the saloon in which the game is taking place (This episode is fictitious.). A shade of Papa Mizner appears and tells Addison that this was not what he had in mind for his sons.

Addison leaves in disgust with his share of Wilson's winnings and travels around the world searching for business opportunities and a sense of purpose ("Addison's Trip"). All of his ventures fail due to bad luck. He is left with nothing but souvenirs that inspire him to take up architecture (so he can design a house in which to show them off). Wilson's businesses in Alaska also have failed, so he comes south to seek his brother's help. Wilson seduces and marries Addison's first client, a rich widow, and fritters away her money on various flashy endeavors, including fixed boxing matches and horse races ("That Was A Year").

Although Wilson's various partners lose money, they remain fond of him because of the verve and energy with which he lives. Even Mama Mizner, who is being looked after by Addison and never receives any visits from Wilson, enjoys reading about Wilson's exploits, saying that she can live through him ("Isn't He Something!"). Only Addison remains uncharmed by Wilson, and when Wilson finally comes back, his resources exhausted, he finds that Mama has died in his absence. Addison angrily throws Wilson out of the house.

Learning of rising property interests in Florida ("Land Boom!"), Addison decides to travel to Palm Beach to take advantage of the many rich people settling there who need houses built. (In reality, Mizner went there for his health.) On the train he meets the fictitious Hollis Bessemer, with whom he is smitten instantly. Hollis is the son of a wealthy industrialist, cut off by his father for refusing to enter the family business. His real passion is art, and although he is not talented, he dreams of creating an artist colony in Palm Beach with the help of his aunt, who is staying there in a hotel ("Talent").

Addison shows Hollis's aunt a plan for a house he proposes to build for her. Impressed, she agrees and offers to sponsor Hollis's artist colony. However, Hollis and Addison, now lovers, are too busy designing resort homes for the rich ("You") and enjoying each other's company ("The Best Thing That Ever Has Happened") to follow up on Hollis's original plan. Wilson arrives at Hollis's and Addison's house, destitute and sick ("The Game [Reprise]"). Addison reluctantly takes him in, and when Wilson has recovered, he begins to work on Hollis, persuading him to be a patron to his newest scheme: to build a brand new city in Boca Raton with Wilson as promoter and Addison as chief architect ("Addison's City").

Wilson's con man instincts resurface. He promotes the Boca Raton real estate scheme with increasingly extravagant and eventually fraudulent claims, creating a price bubble ("Boca Raton"). Addison goes along, until it is Hollis who finally puts a stop to the real-estate scheme. He asks Addison to choose between Wilson and him. Addison, brought to a state of desperation, drives Hollis away by claiming he never loved him. Addison also orders Wilson out of his life ("Get Out"), but Wilson insists Addison loves him too much ("Go"). Addison agrees, but still wants him to go.

Wilson leaves for good, but not quite, for in the finale (as in the first scene) all the characters leave the stage except for Wilson and Addison. At this point, Wilson realizes that he, too, has died. The brothers bicker half-heartedly, their differences no longer mattering enough to keep them apart. Confronted by their father, they shrug off his criticisms and the brothers set out together on the road to eternity—or, as Wilson calls it, "the greatest opportunity of all". "Sooner or later", he says, "we're bound to get it right."

== Musical numbers ==
=== Wise Guys, 1997 New York Theater Workshop ===
As presented in the 1997 Wise Guys reading
Act I

- First Vaudeville - Wilson and Addison
- Benicia - Mama and Ensemble
- My Two Young Men - Mama
- Gold! - Prospector, Wilson, Addison, Mama, and Ensemble
- Second Vaudeville - Wilson and Addison
- Next to You - Wilson, Addison, and Mama
- Addison's Trip - Addison and Ensemble
- Dowagers - Addison
- The Good Life - Wilson
- The Game - Wilson
- Journalists - Wilson
- What's Next? - Wilson
- The Game (reprise) - Wilson
- What's Next? (reprise) - Wilson and Ensemble
- Third Vaudeville - Wilson and Addison
- What's Next? (reprise) - Addison
- I'm on My Way (reprise) - Addison

Act II

- Fourth Vaudeville - Wilson and Addison
- Palm Beach Sequence - Addison, Paris and Ensemble
- Fifth Vaudeville - Addison, Paris, and Wilson
- Boca Raton Sequence - Ensemble
- Get Out of My Life/Go - Wilson and Addison
- Final Vaudeville - Wilson and Addison

=== Wise Guys, 1999 New York Theater Workshop ===
Act I

- Wise Guys - Addison and Wilson
- It's in Your Hands - Papa Mizner
- My Two Young Men - Mama Mizner
- Gold - Prospector
- You and Me Together - Wilson
- The Game - Wilson
- Wise Guys (reprise) - Addison and Wilson
- Next to You - Addison and Wilson
- Addison's Trip (On My Way) - Addison and Ensemble
- Stay Right Where You Are - Wilson and Myra
- That Was a Year - Wilson and Ensemble
- A Little House for Mama - Addison
- Isn't He Something? - Mama Mizner
- Wise Guys (reprise) - Addison and Wilson

Act II

- Talent - Paris Singer
- You - Addison and Paris
- Make It Through the Night - Addison
- Wise Guys (reprise) - Addison, Wilson and Paris
- Boca Raton - Wilson, Addison, Ensemble
- It's in Your Hands Now - Wilson, Addison, Ensemble
- Call it Home - Wilson
- Get Out of My Life - Addison
- Wise Guys (reprise) - Addison and Wilson

=== Bounce, 2003 Chicago/Kennedy Center ===
Act I

- Bounce – Wilson, Addison
- Opportunity – Papa, Mama
- Gold! – Prospector, Wilson, Mama, Addison, Alaskans
- Gold! (Reprise) –
- What's Your Rush? – Nellie
- The Game – Wilson
- Next to You – Addison, Wilson, Mama
- Addison's Trip (Around the World) – Addison, Salesman, Guatemalans, Servants
- The Best Thing That Ever Happened – Wilson, Nellie
- I Love This Town - Wilson, Nellie, Addison, and Company
- Alaska – Mrs. Yerkes, Wilson §
- New York Sequence - Wilson, Nellie, Reporters, Photographer, Ketchel, Armstrong, Jockey, Gamblers, Policeman, Wilson's Women §
- Isn't He Something? – Mama
- Bounce (Reprise) – Addison, the cast.

Act II

- The Game – Addison, Nellie, Wilson, Promoter
- Talent – Hollis
- You – Addison, Hollis, Aristocrats
- Addison's City – Hollis, Wilson, Nellie, Addison
- Get Rich Quick - Company
- Boca Raton – Boca Girl, Sportsmen, Fashion Models, Yachtsmen, Caruso, Salvador Dalí, Wilson, Addison, Nellie, Hollis, Prospector, Varmints, Bobby Jones, Mae West, Princess Ghika, Chorus §
- Last Fight – Addison, Wilson
- Bounce (Reprise) – Wilson, Addison

§ In Chicago production, not in Kennedy Center

=== Road Show, 2008 Off-Broadway ===
Act I

- Waste – Full Company
- It's in Your Hands Now – Papa
- Gold! – Full Company
- Brotherly Love – Addison, Wilson
- The Game – Wilson
- Addison's Trip – Full Company
- That Was a Year – Full Company
- Isn't He Something! – Mama
- Land Boom! – Real Estate Agent
- Talent – Hollis
- You – Full Company
- The Best Thing That Ever Has Happened – Addison, Hollis
- The Game (Reprise) – Wilson
- Addison's City – Addison, Hollis, Wilson
- Boca Raton – Full Company
- Get Out – Addison
- Go – Wilson
- Finale – Addison, Wilson

== Background and Early Workshops ==
Addison and Wilson Mizner both died in 1933. Interest in their colorful lives as dramatic/musical subjects began with the 1952 publication of The Last Resorts, by Cleveland Amory. Irving Berlin was a friend of Addison, and referred to Wilson as "my pal." He began work on a musical called The Mizner Story. It was not completed; a partial manuscript is in the Library of Congress. After the 1953 publication of Alva Johnston's The Legendary Mizners he returned to the project and completed Wise Guy. It was never produced, though songs from it have been published and recorded.

At about the same time, Sondheim began work on a musical based on The Last Resorts, which he discussed with Oscar Hammerstein. In 1956 David Merrick, "for purposes of comparison, sent Sondheim a script by Sam Behrman of Irving Berlin's unproduced musical." Sondheim set his idea aside. Three songs from it ("Pour le Sport", "High Life", and "I Wouldn't Change a Thing") have been published in The almost unknown Stephen Sondheim.

In the workshop, then titled Wise Guys, the show was framed as a vaudeville act, with Wilson and Addison opening the show with the title song, in the style of vaudeville comics, a theme that recurred over the show. The tone was meant to be similar to the Road to ... films starring Bob Hope and Bing Crosby. There was an additional song for Mama Mizner called "Brothers", and a song for Wilson called "Stay Right Where You Are", in which he seduces his future wife. Addison had a song in Act II sung to a sick Wilson called, "Make it Through the Night." This version dealt with Addison's real-life business partner Paris Singer; however, the writers soon decided to deal more openly with Addison's sexuality, and the character of Hollis Bessemer was created. Eventually, the vaudeville concept was dropped, and the overall tone of the show became less comic.

In the later stage version, then titled Bounce, the character of Wilson's wife was developed into a secondary lead called Nellie. Wilson first meets her in a saloon in Alaska, where she seduces him with the song "What's Your Rush?". They re-encounter each other in New York, Nellie having become rich on the brothers' gold claim, and they marry after the song "The Best Thing That Ever Has Happened". She divorces him when his enterprises interfere with their love life. The brothers meet her again in Florida, where she joins in the Boca Raton scheme. After this fails, she leaves with Hollis to find her next opportunity. In Road Show, her character was again reduced to Wilson's marriage to her in Act I.

For Road Show, Sondheim rewrote the opening number "Bounce" as "Waste," to reflect a darker tone. He added an additional song, "Brotherly Love," for the Mizners, and rewrote "The Best Thing That Ever Has Happened" as a duet for Addison and Hollis.

== Lawsuit ==
After a failed workshop in 1999, the Broadway-hopeful production was canceled at the discretion of producer Scott Rudin. Sam Mendes left the production. Hal Prince, a longtime collaborator of Sondheim's, went on to direct the show, now called "Gold!", at the Goodman Theatre. Rudin sent a cease and desist to Sondheim, Prince, and Weidman, claiming he still owned the rights to producing the show, and would sue if they were to perform. Sondheim and Weidman sued Rudin for "Intentional, Malicious and wrongful interference", that canceled the Goodman theatre run and lead to the departure of Prince from the project Rudin countersued the pair, the lawsuit would be settled out of court, with Rudin being paid roughly $160,000

== Production history ==
The musical premiered at the New York Theatre Workshop from October through November 1999 under the title Wise Guys. It was directed by Sam Mendes and starred Nathan Lane (Addison Mizner), Victor Garber (Wilson Mizner), Candy Buckley (Mama Mizner), William Parry (Papa Mizner), and Michael C. Hall (Paris Singer); as well as Christopher Fitzgerald, Brooks Ashmanskas, and Kevin Chamberlin in the Ensemble

Rewritten and given the new title Bounce, the show opened on June 20, 2003 at the Goodman Theatre in Chicago. The production was directed by Harold Prince, with choreography by Michael Arnold, set design by Eugene Lee, costume design by Miguel Angel Huidor, lighting design by Howell Binkley, and hair design by David H. Lawrence. The cast starred Richard Kind (Addison Mizner), Howard McGillin (Wilson Mizner), Jane Powell (Mama Mizner), Herndon Lackey (Papa Mizner/Businessman/Englishman/Plantation Owner/Armstrong/Real Estate Owner), Gavin Creel (Hollis Bessemer), and Michele Pawk (Nellie). This production reunited Sondheim with longtime collaborator Prince for the first time since the disastrous original Broadway production of Merrily We Roll Along in 1981.

The musical then ran at the Kennedy Center in Washington, D.C. in October and November 2003 with the Chicago cast. It received mixed–to–negative reviews and was not produced in New York. A private reading of Bounce was held at the Public Theater on February 6, 2006. Playbill reported that Eric Schaeffer directed, with Richard Kind and Bernadette Peters among the cast.

A new production of the musical, now titled Road Show, rewritten without an intermission and without the leading female character of Nellie (who had been added for the 2003 production), opened Off-Broadway at The Public Theater's Newman Theater in previews on October 28, 2008, officially opening on November 18, and closing December 28, 2008. The director/designer was John Doyle, who had become known for critically-acclaimed Broadway revivals of Sweeney Todd (in 2005) and Company (2006); it starred Michael Cerveris and Alexander Gemignani playing brothers Wilson and Addison Mizner respectively, Alma Cuervo as Mama, Claybourne Elder as Hollis, and William Parry as Papa. This production won the 2009 Obie Award for Music and Lyrics, and the Drama Desk Award for Outstanding Lyrics.

The musical opened in previews at the Menier Chocolate Factory, London on June 24, 2011, officially on July 6 and closed on September 18. John Doyle was the director and designer, with a cast featuring Michael Jibson, David Bedella, and Jon Robyns.

The U.S. regional premiere opened at Stages Repertory Theatre in Houston, Texas on May 22, 2013, directed by Kenn McLaughlin. The cast featured Tom Frey and L. Jay Meyer, playing Wilson and Addison Mizner, respectively, along with Susan Shofner as Mama, Jimmy Phillips as Papa, and Michael McClure as Hollis. Rounding out the cast were Cameron Bautsch, Bridget Bierne, Hunter Frederick, Sarah Myers, Amanda Parker, Amanda Passanante, Tom Prior, and Brandon Whitley.

A production opened at the Chicago Shakespeare Theatre on March 13, 2014, starring Andrew Rothenberg as Wilson and Michael Aaron Lindner as Addison.

The New England premiere of Road Show ran from January 12 to February 11, 2018 at The Lyric Stage Company of Boston in Boston, Massachusetts.

In 2019, Road Show was presented as part of the Encores! Off-Center season at New York City Center from July 24–27. This production starred Brandon Uranowitz as Addison, Raúl Esparza as Wilson, Chuck Cooper as Papa Mizner, Mary Beth Peil as Mama Mizner, and Jin Ha as Hollis Bessemer and was directed and choreographed by Will Davis.

In 2024, the show was revived Off-West End at Upstairs At The Gatehouse, running from December 12, 2024 to January 12, 2025.

== Notable casts ==
Character	New York Theatre	Chicago	Kennedy Center	Off-Broadway	Off-West End	Encores! Off-Center	Off-West End Revival
Character	1999	2002	2003	2008	2011	2019	2024
Addison Mizner	Nathan Lane	Richard Kind	Richard Kind	Alexander Gemignani	Michael Jibson	Brandon Uranowitz	Oliver Sidney
Wilson Mizner	Victor Garber	Howard McGillin	Howard McGillin	Michael Cerveris	David Bedella	Raúl Esparza	Reece Richardson
Mama Mizner	Candy Buckley	Jane Powell	Jane Powell	Alma Cuervo	Gillian Bevan	Mary Beth Peil	Katherine Strohmaier
Papa Mizner	William Parry	Herndon Lackey	Herndon Lackey	William Parry	Glyn Kerslake	Chuck Cooper	Robert Finlayson
Hollis Bessemer	Michael C. Hall _{(as Paris Singer)}	Gavin Creel	Gavin Creel	Claybourne Elder	Jon Robyns	Jin Ha	Rhys Lambert

== Historical Liberties ==
Sometimes the musical is mistaken as a faithful portrayal of the lives of the two brothers; this is not quite the case. Sondheim's interest in the brothers' story came from The Legendary Mizners, written by Alva Johnston, which Sondheim admits was an "exaggerated biography" and Johnston a "fanciful reporter". The exaggerated tone was also kept because Sondheim and Weidman felt it suited the two brothers' attitudes in their own writings, such as Wilson's screenplays and Addison's autobiography.

While Addison was an architect and Wilson a con man, among other things, Hollis Bessemer is fictitious. In early workshops the character was based on Addison's real-life friend Paris Singer, but Singer was not a homosexual and was not Addison's lover. In the workshopped Wise Guys, Addison's sexuality was only hinted at, but Sondheim and Weidman decided they had to address it more openly, and so the character of Hollis was created to give him a love interest. As Sondheim put it, "We wanted to take liberties with our characters, but not misrepresent them. Or be sued by Singer's descendants."

Wilson's role in the Boca Raton fiasco is exaggerated, and while he did marry a rich widow, Mary Adelaide Yerkes, who quickly divorced him, she had not been a client of Addison. Addison never blamed Wilson for all his problems. Mama Mizner was not behind the gold mining adventure by her sons. While Addison did travel considerably, it was not around the world, and it was not the case that part of it was a string of businesses. Addison's alleged decision to become an architect so as to build a house for his souvenirs is colorful, but fictitious.

Wise Guys and Bounce stuck more closely to the facts of the brothers' lives, including references to their other siblings, their father's successful career, and Wilson's New York period, but Sondheim and Weidman decided these facts held back the story with what Sondheim called "interesting and irrelevant information," saying "In our attempt to cover every colorful incident in the Mizners' lives we were shortchanging the emotional content of the material: the convoluted love story between the brothers and with their parents."

== Critical response ==
Referring to the 2003 Bounce productions, TheaterMania noted the "brace of mixed-to-negative reviews has all but assured that this production of Bounce will not be coming to New York." In November 2003, The New York Times reported "the show, which received lukewarm reviews in two tryout runs, is not coming to Broadway anytime soon."

Ben Brantley, in his New York Times review of the 2003 Kennedy Center production, said "[It] never seems to leave its starting point...Mr. Kind and Mr. McGillin execute this self-introduction [title song] charmingly, translating wryness and ruefulness into a breezy soft-shoe sensibility. But in a sense, when they have finished the song they have already delivered the whole show ... Bounce, which features the vibrant Michele Pawk as a zestful gold digger (of both Klondike and jazz-age varieties) and Jane Powell as the Mizners' mother, only rarely kicks into a higher gear than the one that gently propels the opening duet ... their trajectory feels as straight and flat as a time line in a history book. The bounce in Bounce is never very high ... Much of the music, while whispering of earlier, more flashily complex Sondheim scores, has a conventional surface perkiness that suggests a more old-fashioned, crowd-pleasing kind of show than is this composer's wont. But his extraordinary gift for stealthily weaving dark motifs into a brighter musical fabric is definitely in evidence, mellifluously rendered in the peerless Jonathan Tunick's orchestrations."

Brantley, in his review of the 2008 production, praised Cerveris and Gemignani, but declared that, "The problem is that this musical's travelogue structure precludes its digging deep. It hints at dark and shimmering glories beneath the surface that it never fully mines. Like its leading characters, 'Road Show' doesn’t quite know what to do with the riches at its disposal."

== Recordings ==
An original cast recording of the 2003 version (then titled Bounce) was released on May 4, 2004 by Nonesuch Records.

An original cast recording of the 2008 Public Theater production was released June 30, 2009 by PS Classics and Nonesuch Records.
