= Rock Hall =

Rock Hall may refer to:

- Rock Hall, Barbados, a populated place
- Rock Hall, Maryland, a town in the United States
- Rock Hall, Northumberland, a country house in the United Kingdom
- Rock Hall (Lawrence, New York), house museum
- Rock Hall (Colebrook, Connecticut), hotel, historic building

== See also ==
- Rock and Roll Hall of Fame in Cleveland, Ohio
