= WFLA =

WFLA may refer to:

- WFLA (AM), a radio station (970 AM) licensed to Tampa, Florida, United States
- WFLA-FM, a radio station (100.7 FM) licensed to Midway, Florida, United States
- WFLA-TV, a television station (channel 9, virtual 8) licensed to Tampa, Florida, United States
- WFLA (Boca Raton, Florida), a 1927 station set up by town planner Addison Mizner
- WFLF (AM), a radio station (540 AM) licensed to Pine Hills, Florida, United States, which uses the branding am540 WFLA
- WFLF-FM, a radio station (94.5 FM) licensed to Parker, Florida, United States, which uses the branding Fox Newsradio 94.5 WFLA
- WFLZ-FM, a radio station (93.3 FM) licensed to Tampa, Florida, United States, which held the call sign WFLA-FM from 1948 to 1981, and from March 1984 to September 1985
- Western Fraternal Life Association, a Czech-American friendly society
