= Addison Mizner =

American architect (1872–1933)

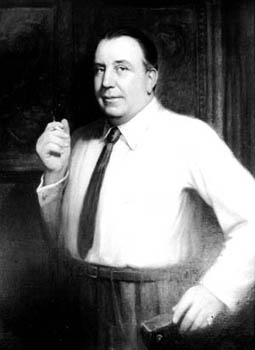
- Born: December 12, 1872; Benicia, California, U.S.
- Died: February 5, 1933 (aged 60); Palm Beach, Florida, U.S.
- Resting place: Cypress Lawn Memorial Park, Colma, California, U.S.
- Occupation: Architect
- Notable work: Everglades Club; El Mirasol (demolished); Riverside Baptist Church; Boca Raton Resort & Club; La Querida (U.S. President John F. Kennedy's "Winter White House")
- Relatives: Lansing Bond Mizner (father); Wilson Mizner (brother)

Addison Cairns Mizner (/ˈmaɪznər/ MIZE-ner) (December 12, 1872 – February 5, 1933) was an American architect whose Mediterranean Revival and Spanish Colonial Revival style interpretations changed the character of southern Florida, where the style is continued by architects and land developers. Palm Beach, Florida, which he "transformed", was his home, and most of his houses are there. He believed that architecture should also include interior and garden design, and initiated the company Mizner Industries to have a reliable source of components. He was "an architect with a philosophy and a dream". Boca Raton, Florida, an unincorporated small farming town that was established in 1896, became the site of Mizner's most famous development project.

The 6-foot-2-inch (1.88 m), 250-pound (110 kg) bon vivant epitomized the "society architect". Rejecting other modern architects for "producing a characterless copybook effect", he sought to "make a building look traditional and as though it had fought its way from a small, unimportant structure to a great, rambling house that took centuries of different needs and ups and downs of wealth to accomplish. I sometimes start a house with a Romanesque corner, pretend that it has fallen into disrepair and been added to in the Gothic spirit, when suddenly the great wealth of the New World has poured in and the owner had added a very rich Renaissance addition." Or as he described his own never-built castle, drawings of which were part of his promotional literature, it would be "a Spanish fortress of the twelfth century captured from its owner by a stronger enemy who, after taking it, adds on one wing and another, and then loses it in turn to another who builds to suit his taste". As these quotes suggest, many Mizner buildings contain styles from more than one period, but all foreign.

== Biography ==
Born in Benicia, at the time "the educational center of California", and (briefly) its state capital, he traveled as a child with his father, Lansing B. Mizner, a lawyer, former President of the California Senate and the U. S. Minister to Central America, based in Guatemala. Brigadier John Kemp Mizner was Addison Mizner's first cousin once removed. As a young man, he visited China in 1893, was briefly a gold miner in the Yukon (1898–99) (Canada, not Alaska). Of his seven siblings, six of them boys, he was closest to his younger brother Wilson, though his disreputable behavior caused Addison many problems. He had a macaw parrot. and kept as pets a series of monkeys, which often rode on his shoulder; his favorite had a headstone at his grave, identifying him as "Johnnie Brown, The Human Monkey, Died April 30, 1927".

In 1932 Mizner published The Many Mizners, an autobiography covering his youth, year mining, and time in New York until the death of his mother. A second volume telling of his life in Florida was begun but never completed; the Palm Beach Historical Society has the typed manuscript. Mizner died in 1933 of heart failure in Palm Beach and is buried in the family vault at Cypress Lawn Memorial Park.

According to Donald Curl, author of Mizner's Florida,

He was just completely outgoing and basically a really good guy. One of the things he was noted for was the kindness toward the people who worked for him and the courtesy he showed them. Some of the other architects of this era were almost the reverse; they saw the other architects as their employees, and they should have nothing to do with the design other than putting it on paper. Mizner was not that way. When the bust began in Florida, he actually helped some of the young architects get established elsewhere.

The vast majority of Mizner's employees developed an affection for and allegiance to him: "It was a pleasure working for Mizner", one remarked.

== Mizner's Hispanism ==
Addison accompanied his father when the latter travelled to Guatemala in August 1889 to begin his duties there. His first stop, aged 15, on the boat to Guatemala was Mazatlán, Mexico. This was Addison's first direct contact with the Hispanic world, which he described as "the greatest day of my life". His father Lansing Mizner spoke fluent Spanish, as did his paternal step-grandfather, James Semple, also a U.S. diplomat in Spanish America. Addison, who became fluent, after some tutoring enrolled at the Instituto Nacional in Guatemala City, "where we learned that boys fought with knives and not with fists". He remained there for a year, visiting Costa Rica, Nicaragua, and Honduras with his father, before returning to California in 1890 to study at the Bates School, a boarding school in San Rafael, California. His studies there ended in 1891 because of his brother Wilson's expulsion for misbehavior. He continued his studies briefly at Boone's College in Berkeley, California, with the hope of passing the entrance examination for the University of California (presently the University of California, Berkeley). Either he never presented himself for the examination, or he failed it. In any event, that was the end of his formal education.

In his own words:

I have based my design largely on the old architecture of Spain — with important modifications and to meet Florida conditions. I studied the architecture of Spain itself and drew somewhat on my knowledge of Spanish tropical America.

In one of his advertisements:

Spanish Art in Boca Raton homes adds a special charm to these dwellings, in a land of tropical beauty where the softness of the South makes life easy.

He also assembled an excellent library on Spanish and Spanish Colonial architecture, which has survived and is now administered by the Historical Society of Palm Beach County.

The first idea of Mizner about his first Florida building, now the Everglades Club, was that it should contain "a Moorish tower", a clear reference to the Alhambra, which Mizner visited and commented on. The Mediterranean Revival style Mizner introduced to South Florida was not Turkish or Italian, it was Spanish, specifically of the hottest, southern part of Spain, Andalucía; colonial Guatemala had similar architecture. He taught workmen to make Spanish red roof tiles, appropriate for the climate. A scholar states that Mizner's mature style was "founded upon the architecture of sixteenth and seventeenth-century Spain", although the Alhambra is older and Guatemala was primarily the workmanlike eighteenth- and nineteenth-century architecture of the south of Spain. Like a colonial Spanish architect would have, in many cases he worked without paper plans.

Many of Mizner's projects have Spanish names: El Mirasol, El Solano, La Ronda (discussed below), and others. In his never-realized plan for Boca Raton, between the present Palmetto Park Road and Hillsboro Boulevard, the main street, El Camino Real, has a Spanish name, though, in another of his fanciful stories, he claimed it was inspired by Rio de Janeiro's Botafogo neighborhood. (What Mizner's commissioned painting on the cover of his first (1925) brochure does resemble in Rio de Janeiro, is the pt:Canal do Mangue, which runs down the middle of a wide street, but is nowhere near Botafogo, which he may have mentioned because it seemed like a more elegant name ("Mouth of Fire") than Mangue "mangrove".) Streets east of the future Seaboard Coast Line Railroad line (where an "Addison Station" was to be constructed) had Spanish personal names: Ponce de Leon, Gonzalo, Juan, Isabel, Hernando, as well as Montazuma [sic], and Noche Triste. To the west they were to have the names of small Spanish cities: Tarragona, Cordoba, Toledo, Alcante ( [sic], for Alicante), Burgos, Palencia, Lucena, the palace/monastery Escorial, and even small towns: Monreal (name of several towns), Munera. In the planned Spanish Village neighborhood ("Mizner Plat 11"), projected streets had Spanish names: the main Alvarado Road, and crossing it, fanciful names, not all of which are visible in the photograph: Ébano, Feraz, Grúa, Haz, Ídolo, Jasmine, Kay, Labio, Malvis, Nao, Orear, Prado, Quevedo, Rocinante, and Salerno. The different types of pottery produced by Mizner Industries each had the name of a Spanish city.

== Mizner the humorist ==
In 1903 Mizner provided illustrations for The Limerick Up to Date Book of Ethel Watts Mumford (San Francisco: Paul Elder). It says something about Mizner that he would illustrate this poem:

There was a young person of Tottenhem,
Whose manners, Good Lord! she'd forgotten them.
When she went to the vicar's,
She took off her knickers
Because she said she was hot in them.

In 1902, with Oliver Herford and Ethel Watts Mumford, he published an annual illustrated The Complete Cynic. Being Bunches of Wisdom Culled from the Calendars of Oliver Herford, Ethel Watts Mumford, Addison Mizner.

- The Cynic's Calendar of Revised Wisdom for 1903
- The Cynic's Calendar of Revised Wisdom for 1904
- The Entirely New Cynic's Calendar of Revised Wisdom for 1905
- The Complete Cynic's Calendar of Revised Wisdom for 1906
- The Altogether New Cynic's Calendar of Revised Wisdom for 1907
- The Quite New Cynic's Calendar of Revised Wisdom for 1908
- The Perfectly Good Cynic's Calendar (1908)
- The Complete Cynic (1910)
- The Revived Cynic's Calendar (1917)

This produced such sayings as: "A woman's mind is cleaner than a man's. She changes it more often" and "Many are called but few get up".

== Mizner the storyteller ==
Mizner was a storyteller but not a reliable one. He invented stories, all set in foreign countries and thus in practice unverifiable. One the lack of veracity of which is documented is the tale of his visit with his father and other family members to the ruins of Copán, in Honduras. "No one knew exactly where it was", and they needed "a small army of carriers and machete wielders to cut our way in". John Lloyd Stephens was "the only other white man to set foot on the temple steps in three hundred and seventy years". However, at least six other white men visited and wrote about Copán in the 19th century, not counting the expeditions of the Peabody Museum of Harvard University. His well-informed father, the U.S. ambassador, surely knew about some of these visitors. Mizner also omitted embarrassing information: he said his father retired as ambassador because "father's health broke down", when in fact his father was dismissed by Secretary of State James G. Blaine after a diplomatic incident.

It was on this journey that he received his first monkey, named Deuteronomy, who drowned, on the return voyage from Nicaragua to Guatemala, after she was hit on the head with a trombone (n.b.) and fell overboard.

As he told it in a totally fictitious tale, he laid out the town of Dawson Creek, British Columbia, with no tape measure. He told a story about how, in 1892, Argelia Benton (es:Argelia Benton), the American wife of Guatemalan dictator Jose Maria Reina Barrios, invited him to build a new palace for her in Guatemala City. He was to receive a retainer of $25,000 in gold, but Barrios was assassinated before Mizner received any of the money. Mizner's dramatic story is not evidenced by the chronology: her residence/palace, Villa Argelia, already existed in 1892, and Barrios was assassinated in 1898.

Much later, Addison said several times that he enrolled "at some point during this time" in the University of Salamanca, in Spain, though the only known detail about his studies there, if they existed, is that he did not receive a degree. There is no confirmation that he ever studied there (and Salamanca's isolation makes it an unlikely choice for a foreign student). The only cities in Spain that it is documented that he visited are Seville, Granada, Toledo, and Burgos.

So much as available evidence indicates, he was never in the small city of Salamanca. However, because of its prestigious and mellifluous name, Salamanca was mentioned by Mizner repeatedly.

- According to Mizner, the Spanish king, Alfonso XIII, came to his hotel, insisted on seeing him, and gave him paneling from "the private apartments of [fifteenth-century] King Ferdinand and Queen Isabella of Spain in Salamanca." There were no such apartments in Salamanca.
- Mizner also said that the entry to the Cloister Inn was through "a large Romanesque arch reminiscent of the entrance gate of the University of Salamanca". There is no Romanesque architecture in Salamanca.
- The Cloister Inn had a "Salamanca Room".
- The huge doors of the Cloister Inn were said to be "three-hundred-year-old originals from the University of Salamanca". In reality, these doors were made of Dade County pine in the workshops of Mizner Industries."
- The ceiling of the house La Bienvenida was "inspired by a cloister ceiling at the library at the University of Salamanca".

Mizner told this kind of story to his clients: in Playa Riente, its "ceiling was from the Chapter House in Toledo, Spain, and the tracery of the doors and windows from the Casa Lonja at Valencia." There was also a yellow carpet "reputed to have been woven by nuns for a cathedral in Granada." (There were no carpets at all, much less ones made by nuns, in Spain during the 16th and 17th centuries.) He never showed photographs or prints in books of the buildings he was allegedly imitating.

A similar Hispanic tale told several times by Mizner is that his administration buildings (in 2017 the Addison Restaurant) was based on the house of the Spanish painter El Greco, in Toledo, Spain. As Mizner surely knew, El Greco's house was long vanished, little is known of it, and the house/museum of El Greco in Toledo, recently constructed and opened in Mizner's day (1911), made no pretense to even be in the same location as the original house. Mizner did not follow the somber architectural style of Castile, where Toledo was, and a similarity between the two buildings is difficult to see. Similarly, he invented the connection between the tower of the Cloister Inn, which is vaguely Spanish, with the Giralda tower of the Cathedral of Seville. The San Francisco Ferry Building (1892) — a project of his mentor Polk (see below) — does have a tower that clearly resembles the Seville tower. Two contemporaneous buildings in south Florida also contain towers based on the Giralda: the Freedom Tower (Miami) (1925) and the Miami Biltmore Hotel (1926), both products of the architectural company Schultze and Weaver, who in 1927 built the Boca Raton Club that Mizner could not.

(The feature of the Everglades Club that is linked to the Giralda is the Patio of Oranges: that is the garden of the Cathedral/former great mosque of Seville, where the Giralda is.)

Similarly, he said that he traveled with his father to San José, Costa Rica, by river, which is impossible: San José is at 3,800 feet (1,200 m), and is not even close to a navigable river. He embellished it further by adding that they had missed a steamer and had to travel by dugout canoe; there have never been dugout canoes in Costa Rica. He said that he based a dining hall, with multiple wash stations, on a "hospital" in Vic, Spain; there is no such building in Vic. He also invented a prize fight in Australia; he had a lifelong leg injury and could not possibly box. But he said he fought the boxing champion of Australia to a draw after twenty rounds ("he was slow and ... I was fast"), and in a rematch knocked out and probably killed his opponent. He had to escape out the back door with his share of the gate, head for the harbor, and board a ship whose gangplank was conveniently just being drawn up. One wonders what to make of his claim that he was "as good a bricklayer as any man I ever had. I can plaster as well as any plasterer I have seen. I am a fairly good carpenter, a better than ordinary electrician. I know how to wipe a joint in plumbing." Similarly, "I had to go into the nursery business and build a tree-moving machine. What fun it was teaching men how to stucco, teaching others how to cure pip in chickens, clearing jungles, killing land crabs, catching alligators. It was all like a game."

== Mizner's buying trips ==
He returned to Guatemala for a few months in 1904. His original plan, never implemented, was to buy coffee to sell in the U.S. (This turned later into a nonexistent coffee plantation that he bought.) Instead, realizing how many antiquities were available for modest amounts, especially in Guatemala's abandoned former capital Antigua, he began collecting Hispanic antiquities. He purchased an old monastery – the whole building. "The reason I wanted it was that eight of the side chapels of the church were intact and in each stood, thirty feet high, carved wood altars with heavy gilding." He also returned with a book of sketches of the architectural features of Antigua. This was a turning point in his decision to become an architect.

Relocating to New York in 1904, he filled his apartment with his Guatemala purchases: rich velvet and damask vestments, ornate carved church paneling, reliquaries, gilded candlesticks, and other rare ornaments. He made "good money" selling them to visitors.

In 1905, Mizner visited Spain for the first time; after that, he visited Europe every year. After relocating to Florida, these visits occurred during the "off" season. In 1924, Mizner went on a buying trip to Spain, scouring antique shops, buying "furiously" thousands of items: wrought iron, tapestries, furniture, grillwork, and whole staircases. He was accompanied by one of his clients, Eleanor Cosden, who is reported to have recalled "the guide in the church in Toledo who, Addison pointed out, got several things wrong," and that "he even straightened out our host, the Duke of Alba!" (The Duke of Alba, one of the richest men in Spain, visited Palm Beach in 1926.) In 1926 he went on a similar visit, abbreviated by the financial crisis.

== Mizner's homosexuality ==
Mizner has been described as "an early influential gay man in South Florida", "the gay father of South Florida architecture." He is portrayed as openly homosexual in the Stephen Sondheim — John Weidman musical Road Show. Mizner described himself as a "lifelong bachelor", after "a few unsuccessful relationships with women in California and New York". One modern researcher says that "Wilson loved women sexually; Addison cherished their friendship and companionship." He tells us, in The Many Mizners, that he "fell desperately in love with Bertha Dolbeer", but the love did not last long, as she "had fallen out of a window at the Waldorf-Astoria and had been instantly killed". At the same time, when he was living in San Francisco, he had "an emotional relationship with a young man, Jack Baird". He described a buying trip to Europe with Margaret "Peggy" Thayer, "a wicked little devil", as "the happiest two months of my life". (His story that he had had a "love affair with the president [of Guatemala]'s daughter" is fictitious.)

Although at that period he could not be open, his biographer Caroline Seebohm said "his mature sexual taste was for very young men", "pretty boys with pretensions," and he had "a series of young boys in tow" during his later years. One of these "young and handsome" men was Alex Waugh, who accompanied Mizner on buying trips and ended up manager of the antiques and reproduction furniture store for Mizner Industries. When Waugh sent recollections of Mizner to biographer Alva Johnston, they were "quite unprintable". Another was Horace Chase, his "wild, thoroughly-likeable" nephew, for two years the manager of the "virtually inoperable pottery factory, 'Las Manos' ['The Hands']", which he bought from Paris Singer. "Jack Roy was a memorable young man whom Addison made manager of his furniture factory despite his having no experience whatsoever in management or any familiarity with artisanship ... Addison met Jerry Girandolle in New York and, after giving him a new Cadillac, also made him manager of the furniture factory [Jack having departed]. Later, Addison was attracted to the young painter he used on the Cosden house, Achille Angeli, 'a strikingly handsome young fellow'."

== Early architectural career ==
Little is known about Addison Mizner's sketches and artwork prior to his architectural career; he did brag in 1893 of having sold six pictures for $150. His subsequent work shows him to be a fine draftsman and an artist who painted beautiful watercolors.

Although he lacked formal university training, Mizner served a 3-year apprenticeship (1894–1897) in the office of San Francisco architect Willis Jefferson Polk, eventually becoming a partner. Polk was only five years older than Addison and was not committed to any architectural style. "His [Mizner's] architectural training rivaled that of many in the profession of his day."

In 1904 he relocated to New York City, and then to nearby Port Washington, Long Island. During his first five years in New York, Mizner never built a house. The commissions he did receive were for interior design, which in two cases were the interior of yachts, and in designing gardens. Eventually he designed numerous country houses across Long Island and the region. In 1907, he and William Massarene designed White Pine Camp, a retreat in the Adirondack Mountains, later used by U. S. President Calvin Coolidge as his "Summer White House". He also designed Rock Hall in Connecticut and the main house of the Hitchcock Estate in Dutchess County, New York.

== Florida ==
In January 1918, aged 46, Mizner visited Palm Beach, Florida for his health, at the suggestion of Paris Singer, whose house guest he was. He was "prepared to die", but instead recovered. He decided to stay. The existing architecture in Palm Beach was wooden – Flagler's two hotels, the Royal Poinciana and The Breakers (burned 1925), were wooden — and in a style better suited for colder weather, Mizner tells us. Familiar from Guatemala with Hispanic warm climate architecture, he chose it as a style more appropriate for South Florida. His Mediterranean Revival designs won the attention and patronage of wealthy clients, who preferred to build their own individual ocean-front mansions. Constructed of stone, tile, and stucco, his buildings were better suited to Florida's semi-tropical climate (and threat of hurricanes) than the wooden shingle-style resort architecture imported from the Northeast. As a result of Mizner, "Palm Beach was transformed.". Mizner "designed with the wealthy in mind"; people "began building private residences on a grand scale." As a result in large part of Mizner, "by 1925 Palm Beach had established itself as the resort community of the United States."

Mizner's concept of architect was that he did not just design a building, but also its interior decoration and gardens.

His houses were generally one room deep to allow cross-ventilation, with kitchens located in wings to keep their heat away from living areas. Kitchens were also located downwind of the dining area. They were built with courtyards on various levels, replete with arcades and lofty galleries; rooms featured exposed rafters and vaulted ceilings; tiled pools and mosaics were said to resemble those of Pompeii (if that is not another of Mizner's exaggerations). Other characteristic features included loggias, colonnades, clusters of columns supporting arches, French doors, casement windows, barrel tile roofs, hearths, grand stairways and decorative ironwork.

=== The Everglades Club ===
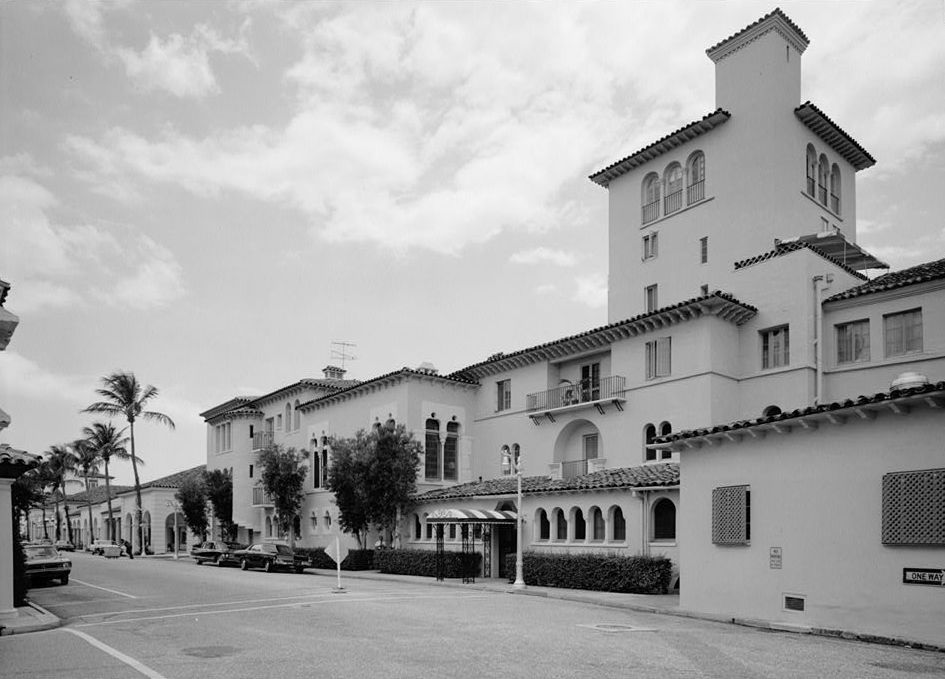
The Everglades Club, Palm Beach, Florida.

Mizner's first big commission, and the project that made him famous, was the Everglades Club, which opened in January 1919. It was a "revelation" and its architectural effect "cannot be exaggerated". Another scholar says that Mizner "revolutionized Palm Beach architecture". No one had seen anything like it: a "gorgeous pink stucco palace, with arcades, wrought-iron balconies, and terra-cotta-tile roofs." There were two four-hundred-year-old doors, and chairs of the same antiquity. Hispanic tiles were everywhere. "It took the place by storm", said Singer years later. An even larger project, the 147-room mansion El Mirasol (demolished), followed in 1919. Mizner received many subsequent commissions, in what was the most successful part of his career. From 1919 to 1924 he designed about thirty-eight houses in Palm Beach. His clients were wealthy and socially prominent: Gurnee Munn, John Shaffer Phipps, Barclay Harding Warburton II, Anthony Joseph Drexel Biddle Jr., Edward Shearson, Rodman Wanamaker, Paul Moore Sr., and Eva Stotesbury among them. For them, he created "a Mediterranean village".

=== Mizner Industries ===
To make materials for the Everglades Club, he and Paris Singer purchased a small facility and began the manufacture of roof and floor tiles, with a sideline production of ironwork and furniture. The factory also made pottery; Mizner viewed pottery as something that "could be effectively used to integrate an indoor and outdoor color scheme." The factory was called "Las Manos" ("The Hands"), referring to the way products were made there: "con las manos", with our hands, by hand.

After the Club was completed in 1919, Singer sold Mizner his interest in the factory, which prospered. In West Palm Beach, "just east of the railroad," by 1925 Mizner Industries Incorporated was making, according to its catalog, "pottery, roof and floor tile, period furniture, wicker, upholstering, repairing, antique millwork and hardware, bronze sash, wrought iron, stained and leaded glass windows, reconstructed and ornamental stone, and imitation marble." It was one of the largest manufacturing companies in Palm Beach County. Mizner lacked the talent for making conventional plans and specifications. Everything was done off-the-cuff. Plans for one house were drawn in the sand on the beach. He was a pioneer in developing artificial or cast stone, a combination of coquina shell, lime, and a cement mixture. He also used "woodite", a composite material with a wood component, which could be poured and molded. As a result, Mizner Industries sold "precast plastering", highly ornate plaster coffered ceilings and mouldings, and with woodite, besides antique-style doors, the paneling of a complete room, all at a relatively low cost. "One of the major difficulties in identifying Mizner buildings is the presence of Mizner Industries stonework on non-Mizner buildings"; a number of buildings he did not build are frequently misattributed to him.

Mizner Industries, copying imported antiques or photographs, manufactured beds, tables, taborets, chests, dressing tables, wardrobes, "all pieces of furniture imaginable." There were two qualities: "a superior, handcrafted line ... extremely difficult to distinguish from authentic Spanish antiques," and another "good, sturdy line with little or no hand attention."

=== Mizner's Florida style ===
Mizner was anything but a follower of styles. He would improvise a building's design as he went; he was someone who "would take a lot of liberties", who "let his imagination run riot". In the end, Mizner would create a pink-walled, red-tiled, wrought iron-gated world of unreal luxury. Developers loved the Mizner style because it gave their brand-new developments an air of established, Old World elegance. It was imitated in new developments in the Florida peninsula. "It is style," said Donald Curl. "As an architect, he introduced Mediterranean revival, or Spanish revival, or whatever you wanted to call it. He made it not only popular but fashionable. Mizner was someone who was willing to take a lot of liberties and design buildings that were good for the climate and the lifestyle of the people who were his clients." "I never begin to design a home without first imagining some sort of romance about it. Once I have my story, then the plans take place easily."

Mizner created a version of Spanish style that was appropriate to twentieth-century Florida.

The loggia room has survived as the Florida room. The changing room is now an essential. The focal point, now swimming pool with bridge or hanging basket chair, creates the necessary element of excitement. Native building materials are touted. Red tile remains a precious commodity. Pastel colors prevail. Meandering streets with boutiques are today's key to a successful commercial adventure. The advantages of mixed residential and commercial use have become obvious.

=== "Antiquing" buildings ===
To get the all-important appearance of antiquity Mizner inflicted vandalism. He deliberately smudged up new rooms with burning pots of tarpaper, took penknife to woodwork and statuary, chipped tiles, used acid to rust the iron, made wormholes with an icepick, cracked a mantle with a sledgehammer, all creating what he called "the kiss of the centuries." He hired inexperienced help to lay roof tiles awry, and once had men in hobnailed boots walk up and down a stairway before the cement set to get the effect of centuries of wear. One of his original contributions to architecture was the discovery that worm-eaten cypress gave the desired effect of age; thus "pecky" cypress, weak and worthless for structural elements, suddenly became the mahogany paneling of Palm Beach.

== Selected buildings ==
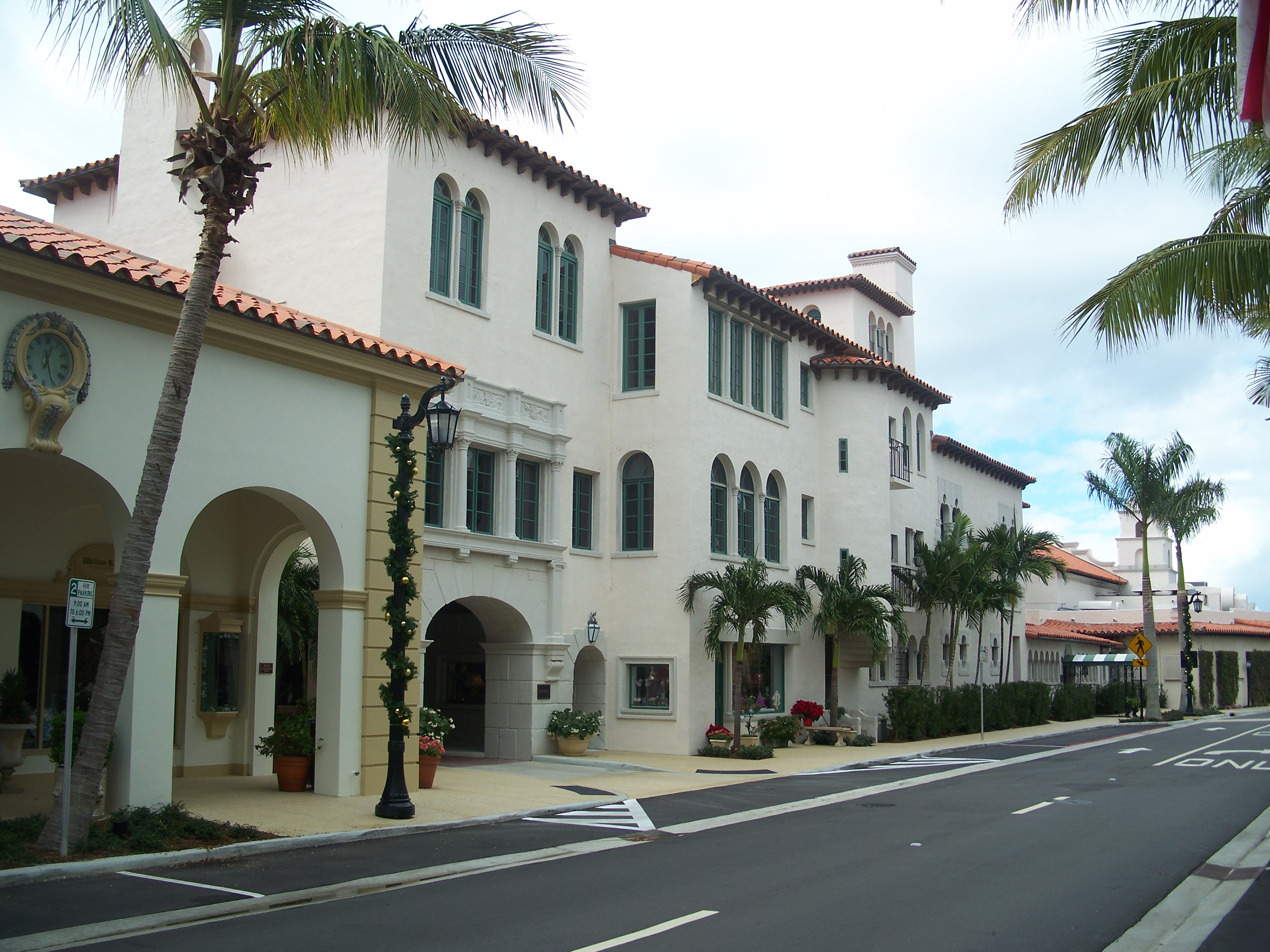
Everglades Club

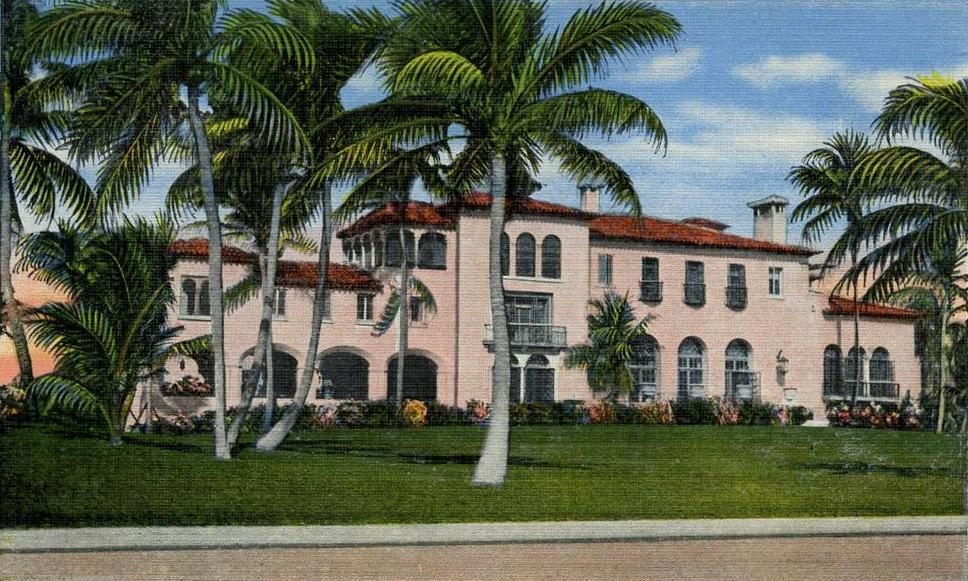
El Mirasol (the Edward T. Stotesbury mansion), Palm Beach, Florida (1919, demolished 1950s).

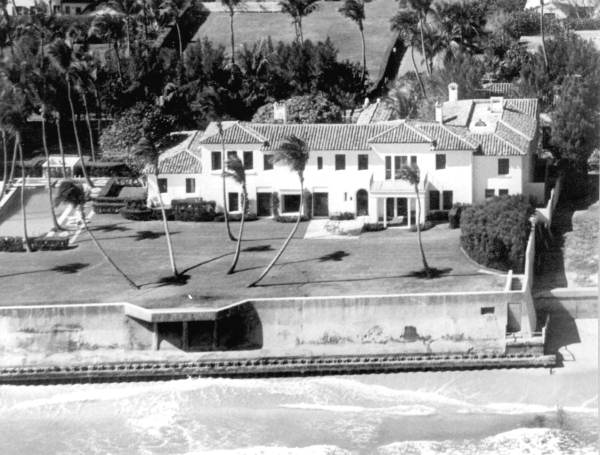
"La Querida," the Kennedy family winter retreat, located at 1095 North Ocean Boulevard in Palm Beach.

- An oceanfront Palm Beach estate was once owned by the late John Lennon and his wife Yoko Ono Named El Solano. Located on South Ocean Boulevard, popularly referred to as Billionaires' Row, the house is next door to a property owned by author James Patterson, records show.
- Mizner designed the Hitchcock Estate in Millbrook, New York, in 1912.
- Mizner's first major Florida commission was the Everglades Club, a Spanish-mission-style convalescent retreat built in 1918, that became (and remains) a private club. It stands at 4 Via Parigi (off Worth Avenue) in Palm Beach.
- Mizner designed the 37-room El Mirasol ("the sunflower"), completed in 1919, for investment banker Edward T. Stotesbury, head of the town's most notable family of the time. It included a 40-car garage, a tea house, an auditorium and a private zoo. The mansion stood at 348 N. Ocean Boulevard in Palm Beach, but was demolished in the 1950s.
- La Bellucia, at 1200 South Ocean Boulevard, was built in 1920 for Dr. Willey Lyon Kingsley. In 2009 it was Palm Beach's largest recorded sale at $24 million.
- Also in 1920, Mizner built a grand Palm Beach estate home called Costa Bella ("beautiful coast") at 111 Dunbar Road for Elizabeth Hope Gammell Slater. Her father was Prof. William Gammell, and her grandfather was Robert Ives of the firm Brown and Ives. In a story published in The New York Times in 1882, her mother was "reckoned the richest woman in America, her property placed at twenty millions or more." Addison Mizner used his primary builder and contractor at that time, Cooper C. Lightbown, who later became the Town of Palm Beach's Mayor from 1922 to 1927.

In his book Mizner's Florida, author and historian Donald W. Curl noted the home's "massive stone staircase" and that the home was more formal than Mizner's typical work. This formality is seen in such details as the pure Belgian black marble he used in the entrance foyer, and one of the first uses of terrazzo flooring for the 1920s showcased in the palatial dining hall. Furthermore, Curl notes the "stalactite" lighting fixture and gothic tracery for the dining room ceiling. It is believed that Mizner replicated the plasterwork in the dining room from photographs of the Alhambra that he had taken from his travels in Spain. Costa Bella's massive ballroom and dining hall feature grandiose palladian windows and french doors. Hence, historian Curl comments that, "the extensive fenestration created an open and light vacation house." Costa Bella is the quintessential example of Mizner's architectural majesty encompassing all the elements and building materials he is famous for: towering hand-stenciled wood beamed cypress ceilings, coral stone flooring, antique tiles, elaborate decorative columns and corbels, unique light fixtures, stone carvings and stone-carved fireplace mantels.

- In 1922, Mizner built the William Gray Warden Residence (Warden House) at 112 Seminole Ave, Palm Beach, which is listed on the U.S. National Register of Historic Places.
- Another fanciful Palm Beach mansion, Villa Flora, was built in 1923 for Edward Shearson. It stands at 110 Dunbar Road.
- La Querida ("the dear one"), apocryphally conflated with La Guerida ("bounty of war"), was built in Palm Beach in 1923 for Rodman Wanamaker of Philadelphia, heir to the Wanamaker's department store fortune. It was later purchased by Joseph P. Kennedy Sr. in 1933 during the depths of the Great Depression for $120,000, and eventually would become President John F. Kennedy's "Winter White House". It sold for $70,000,000 in June 2020. It stands at 1095 N. Ocean Boulevard.
- As early as 1925, Mizner was commissioned by Dr and Mrs (Lillian) Thomas Dempsey to build a beautiful, diminutive Mediterranean Revival summer home (possibly the smallest structure Mizner ever built). The house has 22' ceilings, enabling the architect to install a "mezzanine-loggia," encircled by the hand-wrought iron railings for which a classic Mizner building is known. The house, at 100 S. Osborne Avenue, Margate, New Jersey (formerly 8704 Atlantic Ave) is on a beach block corner where Atlantic Ave intersects Osborne. (A stone's throw away, another architectural landmark, known as Lucy the Elephant, holds court at the corner of Atlantic and Washington Avenues.) Jeff Rosen of Spielberg Productions, who purchased the home from the Dempsey estate, later sold it to Marsha & Michael Birnbaum of Bryn Mawr, Pennsylvania. It has since been purchased and is occupied by auteur-singer-poet Silkë Berlinn.
- Mizner's own Palm Beach home was built in 1925. It was called El Solano after the hot, oppressive wind which blows off the Mediterranean Sea in eastern Spain, but also for Solano County, California, his birthplace. Sold to Harold Vanderbilt, the estate was later purchased by John Lennon. It stands at 720 S. Ocean Boulevard.
- He designed and built the Riverside Baptist Church in Jacksonville, completed in 1926. Because he promised to build it in honor of his mother, Ella Watson Mizner, the architect refused payment for his services. The church stands at 2650 Park Street, and is Mizner's only work of religious architecture.
- The clubhouse for the Wee Burn Country Club in Darien, Connecticut was designed by Mizner in his Mediterranean style in 1926.
- A mansion of 14,550 square feet (1,352 m^{2}), with a 4,800 square feet (450 m^{2}) guest house, was built at 1820 S. Ocean Blvd. for Paul Moore Sr. (completed 1926). After a two-year renovation-and-restoration project, the property was listed for sale in 2018 for $58,000,000.
- In 1928, he designed the original Cloister Hotel at Sea Island, Georgia. It was demolished in 2003.
- Mizner also built a Mediterranean Revival mansion in Bryn Mawr, Pennsylvania, in 1929, La Ronda. It was demolished on October 1, 2009. Some architectural elements were salvaged.

== Mizner Mile ==
In Boynton Beach, Florida, between Palm Beach and the future Boca Raton, Mizner's first vision of a "comprehensive ocean city" was a mile-long resort. "Mizner Mile, situated on [what is today (2018)] Old Ocean Boulevard, was to include a club, polo fields, houses designed by Mizner, and a two-thousand-room hotel modeled on 'the lines of a Spanish monastery'." He planned to exchange the design of a new Boynton City Hall for city commissioners' permission to build his hotel and club. The project (1924–1925) went aground, and Mizner abandoned it, after locals strongly opposed the relocation of Old Ocean Boulevard – a new road was built and the original road was to be destroyed – to allow beachfront lots. He designed plans for a never-built Boynton Woman's Club without fee "in an effort to make amends to the city".

== Boca Raton development ==
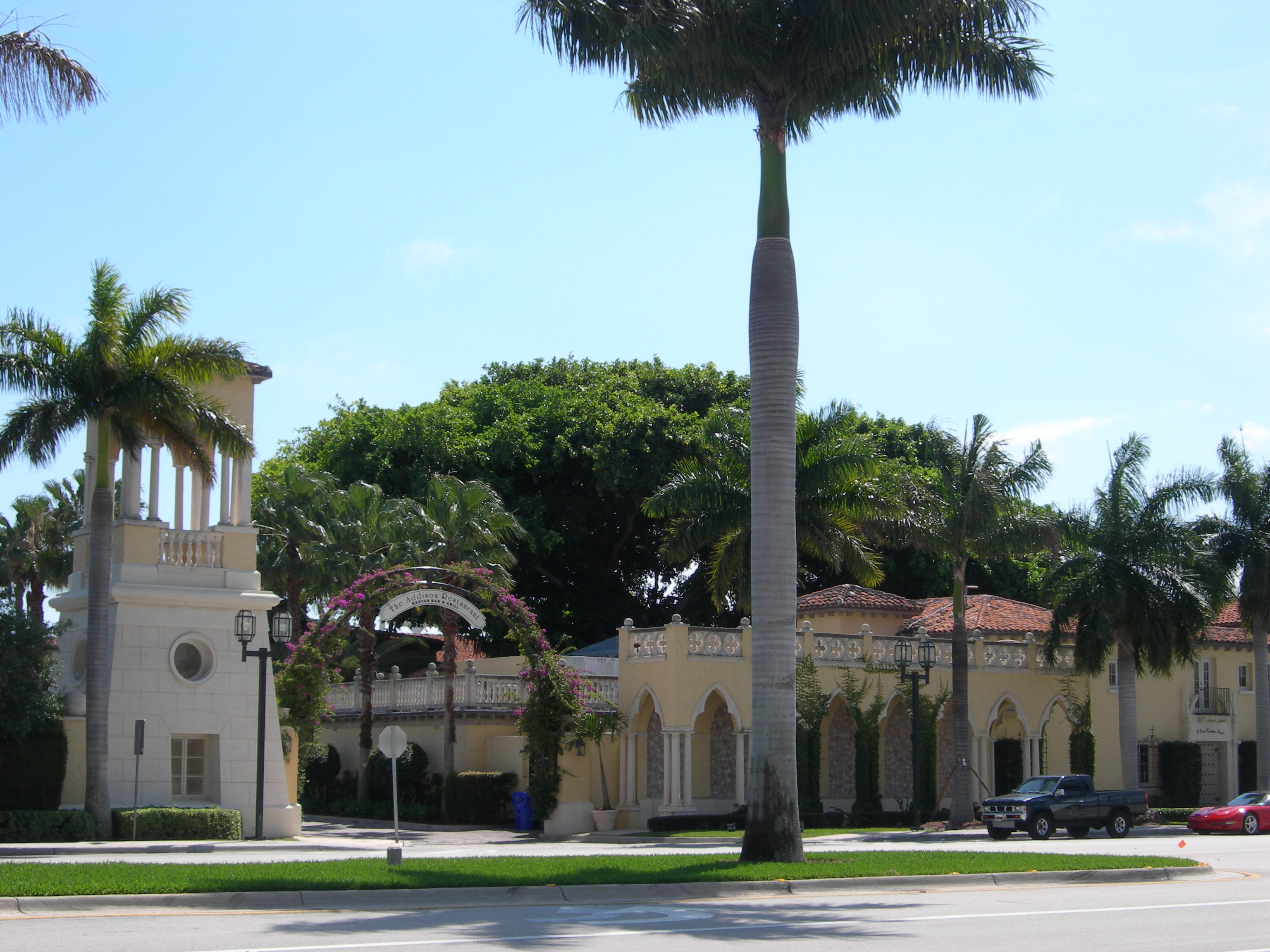
Administration Buildings, Mizner Development Corporation, Boca Raton, Florida (1925). In 2018 The Addison, a venue for wedding receptions and similar celebrations.

In 1925 Addison Mizner embarked on his most ambitious project, what he called his "culminating achievement": the creation of a fabulous resort at Boca Raton. He claimed that it would offer more than Palm Beach, and was "undoubtedly the most tremendous land development project ever launched in the state of Florida." The city was incorporated in 1924 and immediately appointed him city planner. Boca Raton's original City Hall, which currently houses the city's Welcome Center and the Boca Raton History Museum, began as his project, though because of the bankruptcy of Mizner Industries he did not complete it, and it is more modest than he planned.

He began by forming the Mizner Development Corporation, a syndicate of prominent investors including Rodman Wanamaker, Paris Singer, Irving Berlin, William Kissam Vanderbilt II, Elizabeth Arden, Jesse Livermore, Clarence H. Geist, and T. Coleman du Pont as chairman. In March the corporation quietly bought up two miles (3.2 km) of ocean-front property with an overall total of over 1,600 acres (650 ha). On April 15, 1925, the syndicate announced this large development, labeled the "Venice of the Atlantic", which would feature a thousand-room hotel, two golf courses, a polo field, parks, and miles of paved and landscaped streets which included a 160-foot-wide (49 m) grand boulevard called El Camino Real. In an address before 100 salespeople, the architect declared:

It is my plan to create a city that is direct and simple ... To leave out all that is ugly, to eliminate the unnecessary, and to give Florida and the nation a resort city as perfect as study and ideals can make it.

On the first day of selling lots, May 14, 1925, $2 million was sold, with a further $2 million within the first month. There was a traffic jam in front of his Miami office. Mizner ran buses to Boca from Worth Avenue in Palm Beach, and also used seaplanes to transport potential buyers to the site. According to a typically exaggerated sales brochure, he had offices in "several cities in Florida", as well as New York, Philadelphia, Boston, Baltimore, Washington, D.C., and Savannah, Georgia. (The only sales offices were in Palm Beach, Miami, and his Administration Buildings in the future Boca Raton.)

By the end of October more than $25 million in lots had been sold (though in most cases not paid for). Seeing that the large hotel would take a long time to build, Mizner immediately began work on a 100-room smaller hotel, the Ritz-Carlton Cloister Inn (now a wing of the Boca Raton Resort & Club). It was constructed during late 1925 and opened in early 1926, at a cost of $1,750,000.

== Mizner's role in the land boom collapse of 1926 ==
Where Mizner was not strong was in planning. He built houses "off the cuff", without plans. He also had no financial plan, and tried to handle finance off the cuff as well. But the facilities he had announced — three golf courses, a polo ground, a theater, a large church, and an airport, to start with – were going to require a lot of money to build. Mizner did not have it, and he did not have a plan for getting it, or as a writer put it, his "extravagant imagination outstripped his budget and the market." He lacked "financial sense and business shrewdness." What he had were a lot of high society contacts, fame, and a track record building houses for the wealthy in Palm Beach.

When Addison Mizner set up Mizner Development Corporation in 1925, he was able to assemble a fantastic board of famous people and investors, which was a prime reason why initial sales were spectacular. Marie Dressler, recruited as a salesperson, described selling Boca Raton lots as "a creative endeavor" and the activity there as theater ("uprooting large palm trees and planting them around houses ... to lend a touch of tropic romance to a scene").

A 1925 advertisement reassures purchasers ("doubters") that Florida property is "gold", and that they are getting a bargain, buying early. Another, that "an investment in Boca Raton soil [sic] is an anticipation of potential profit," and "every promise of the Mizner Development Corporation is meant to be kept." His advertisements said to attach the ad to the sales contract, as a part of it, and noted "the names" who were "guaranteeing" the project. Using the names to make sales was the idea of publicity agent Harry Reichenbach. But the cash flow was not even close to sufficient to build his promised facilities. Some of the directors, whose attorneys warned them of potential liability, since their names were being used in advertisements, resigned. DuPont unsuccessfully requested the resignations of Reichenbach and corporation treasurer Wilson Mizner, who taught salesmen to mention the famous names. He resigned as chairman of the board on October 24, 1925, "a nasty split." A statement from du Pont's resignation was reported in The New York Times. Three other directors and a member of the Finance Committee resigned within days, making a public statement that the Corporation should not be using their names since they had little control over the company, which did not have "reasonable and competent management." The Ritz-Carlton Cloister Inn opened on February 6, 1926, and Mizner had an elegant dinner for 500 guests, after rush ordering 906 dozen plates, cups, and other items. Over the winter season an additional $6 million trickled in, but sales came to a halt in the spring, and previous purchasers were not all making payments. By May 1926 unpaid contractors were beginning legal action against the company, forcing it into receivership. This led to Mizner's losing control of the corporation in July 1926 and to bankruptcy in September. This was the beginning of the end of Mizner's career as an architect.

A statement during the bankruptcy proceedings outlined what the Mizner Development Corporation had accomplished as of December 4, 1926, besides building the Administration Buildings and the Cloister Inn:

Three thousand acres (1,200 ha) were cleared; land was cleared for forty-two miles (68 km) of streets and thirty-two miles (51 km) were graded; one hundred eighty thousand square feet (17,000 m^{2}) of sidewalks built; seven bridges had been constructed; thirteen miles (21 km) of water mains installed; and fifteen wells for water supply drilled and connected. Forty-six houses had been completed and thirty-five more were under construction. Two golf courses, the Cloister course and the Ritz-Carlton course, were fully completed with functioning water systems and an equipped radio broadcasting station had been finished.

== Bankruptcy ==
The bankruptcy was resolved a year later in November 1927, when Clarence Geist bought the Company's assets. As well as the Cloister Inn, the corporation had built two Administration Buildings, a radio station, WFLA, and twenty-nine homes. Geist, a utilities executive, saw to it that Boca got a fine water plant; Mizner was unconcerned about such infrastructure.

Many people lost money through their investments in Boca Raton lots through Mizner; people who had purchased lots with the intention of quickly reselling them, very common during the land boom, found them worthless. After bankruptcy proceedings, creditors received 0.1% on the dollar; for example, the Andrews Asphalt and Paving Company received $93.36 of its $93,362 claim, and Riddle Engineering Company received $30.76 of its bill of $30,764. The Palm Beach Savings Bank, which had lent Mizner Development over 70% of its capital (the stockholders of Mizner were also officers of the bank), closed permanently in June 1926, because of the Mizner bankruptcy. After the bankruptcy, when credit typically improves, Mizner borrowed:

- $99,636 from the Farmers Bank and Trust Company
- $47,500 from the Commercial Bank and Trust Company
- $101,689 from the First American Bank and Trust
- $57,982 from the Palm Beach Bank and Trust Company
- $99,500 from the Chelsea Exchange Bank

Nothing was ever repaid of the last three loans. Mizner himself was hurt financially. He was not noted for his business acumen, and a recent biographer qualifies him as "naïve" and "in denial", but with no intention to defraud. No one has ever described Mizner as greedy or motivated by prospects of financial gain. Members of his board, it was learned after banking records were unsealed more than sixty years later, were engaged in criminal embezzlement through their partnership in the Palm Beach Savings Bank. Mizner apparently knew nothing of this and would likely have been horrified if he had learned of it.

Mizner Industries was declared bankrupt four months after Mizner's death in 1933. The company had stopped paying federal tax and county property tax after 1928. The company emerged from the bankruptcy reorganization and continued operations.

== Late career ==
In 1927 Mizner built a house for John R. Bradley called Casa Serena in Colorado Springs. Several of Mizner's friends got together in 1928 to publish a folio monograph of his work. It was entitled Florida Architecture of Addison Mizner and featured 185 photographs of homes by Frank Geisler. Paris Singer contributed an introduction and Ida M. Tarbell wrote the text. There was also an "Edición Imperial", limited to 100 copies, a leather-bound, gold-tooled version with slipcase cover. This brought Mizner several commissions but they came to a stop with the beginning of the world depression. "With neither prospects nor money, [he] was sadly forced to rely on financial support from friends [such as] Irving Berlin and Edward Moore."

The one exception was the extensive Dieterich estate, 'Casa Bienvenida' (Welcome House), on Park Lane in Montecito near Santa Barbara, California. He designed and directed its creation from 1929 to 1930. The significant new Mediterranean Revival estate's budget was unhindered by the Wall Street crash of 1929. The naturalistic landscape and formal gardens were designed by atmospheric painter and landscape designer Lockwood de Forest Jr. (1850–1932). His water channels are replicas of those at Villa Lante at Bagnaia, near Viterbo in the Italian Tuscany region. Mizner integrated the principal indoor and outdoor rooms by a cloistered arcade with slender columns on three sides of a large courtyard. He linked that to the inclined axis with a pavilion in the form of a Palladian arch on a terraced stone pedestal at the vista terminus. Casa Bienvenida is extant and well maintained to the present day.

The Spanish revival style here draws its forms and elements from medieval sources. Mizner used many high art details not generally found in this area ... while maintaining the Santa Barbara characteristic of pure design.

== Legacy ==
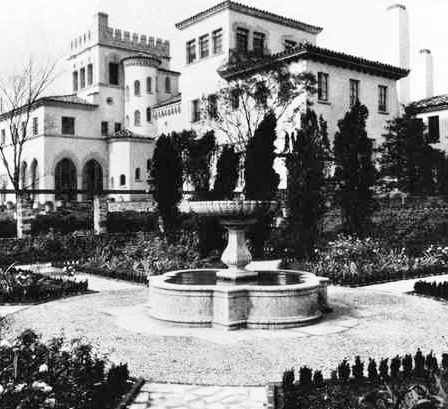
La Ronda (Percival E. Foerderer mansion), Bryn Mawr, Pennsylvania (1929, demolished Oct. 2009).

Mizner's buildings were typically dismissed by Modernist critics for their eclectic historicist aesthetic. Many were demolished and redeveloped, but a number of those that survive are now on the National Register.

Architects and contractors alike copied Mizner's iteration of Spanish colonial architecture.

In the Boca Raton area, his names, Addison and Mizner, are frequently found on streets, businesses, and developments. On the grounds of the Boca Raton Resort and Club is Mizner Lake Estates, an intimate 15-estate gated enclave of million dollar homes with 24-hour security. In Delray Beach can be found Addison Reserve Country Club, a golf and tennis community of 717 luxury single-family homes situated on 653 acres (2.64 km^{2}). It consists of nineteen villages with names such as "Mirasol" and "Playa Riente". Also in Boca Raton is Mizner Park, an upscale "lifestyle center" with shops, rental apartments, and offices. In March 2005, to commemorate his visionary contributions to both the city and Florida architecture, an 11-foot-tall (3.4 m) statue of the architect by Colombian sculptor Cristobal Gaviria was erected in Boca Raton at Mizner Boulevard and U.S. 1. In addition, Addison Mizner Elementary School in Boca Raton was named for him in 1968.

He was the brother and sometimes partner of businessman, raconteur, con man, professional gambler, and playwright Wilson Mizner, whom Addison termed "my chief weakness and dreaded menace". The brothers' series of picaresque misadventures were the inspiration for Stephen Sondheim's musical Road Show (2008) (also titled Bounce and Gold!), which was also produced in Chicago and London. Previously, in 1952, Addison's friend Irving Berlin wrote a musical called Wise Guy (also named Palm Beach, Sentimental Guy, and The Mizner Story), which never got produced. It featured Addison, Wilson, his friends, and his clients. According to the Introduction by Isaiah Sheffer, three songs from that work were included in the 1996 sheet music album The Unsung Irving Berlin.

In 1951 Theodore Pratt wrote a novel, The Big Bubble, which is a thinly veiled biography of Mizner. In 2014 Richard René Silvin published his book Villa Mizner: The House that Changed Palm Beach, chronicling the life of Addison Mizner though a story about Mizner's own home on Worth Avenue and Via Mizner, Palm Beach: Villa Mizner.

Mizner's Lounge was the name of the tavern at Walt Disney World's Grand Floridian Resort & Spa from the hotel's opening in 1988 until 2019. Mizner's Lounge closed on April 12, 2019, to be replaced by a Beauty and the Beast-themed bar and lounge.

== Award ==
The Addison Mizner Award was created in 2013 by the Florida Chapter of the Institute of Classical Architecture & Art for Excellence in Classical and Traditional Architecture. During the early period of Florida's urban development, the standards of excellence in composition and craftsmanship were defined by Mizner's civic and domestic works in classical and traditional design. The awards are presented yearly in the multiple categories.

== Gallery ==
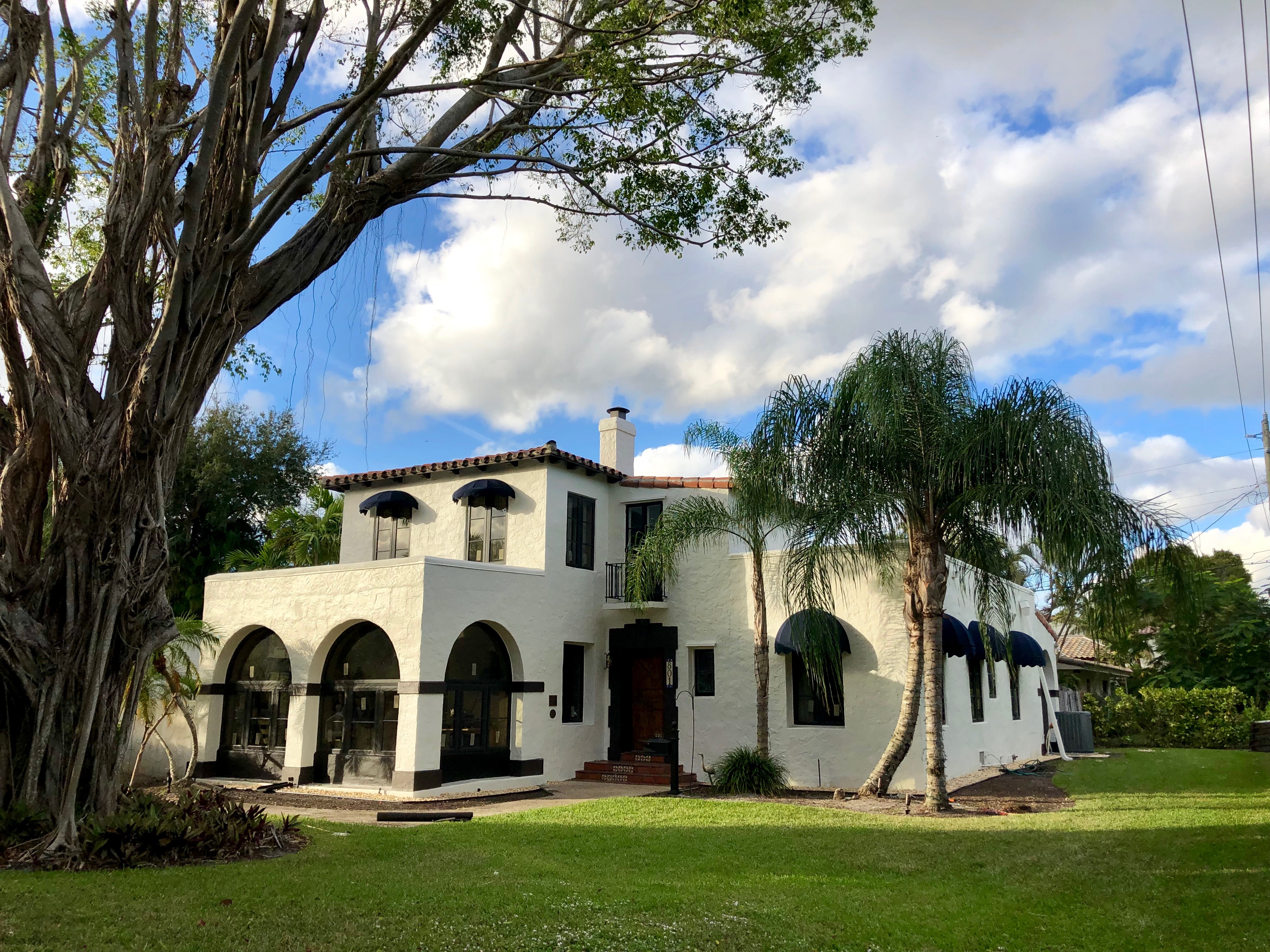
Fred C. Aiken House, Boc Paul Smiths, New York (1907). Designed with William Massarene.

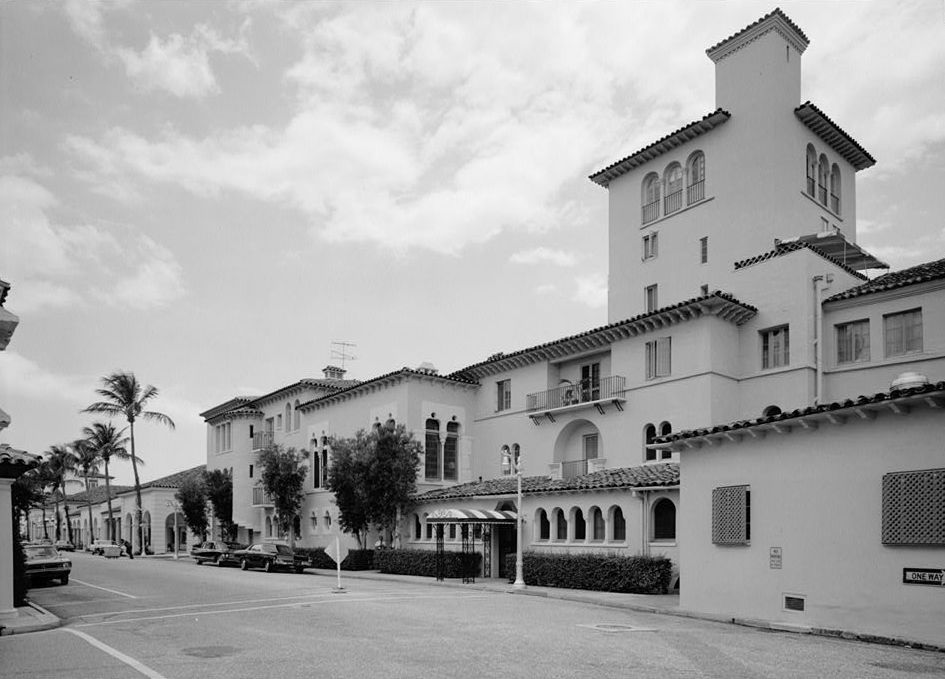
Everglades Club, Palm Beach, Florida (1918).

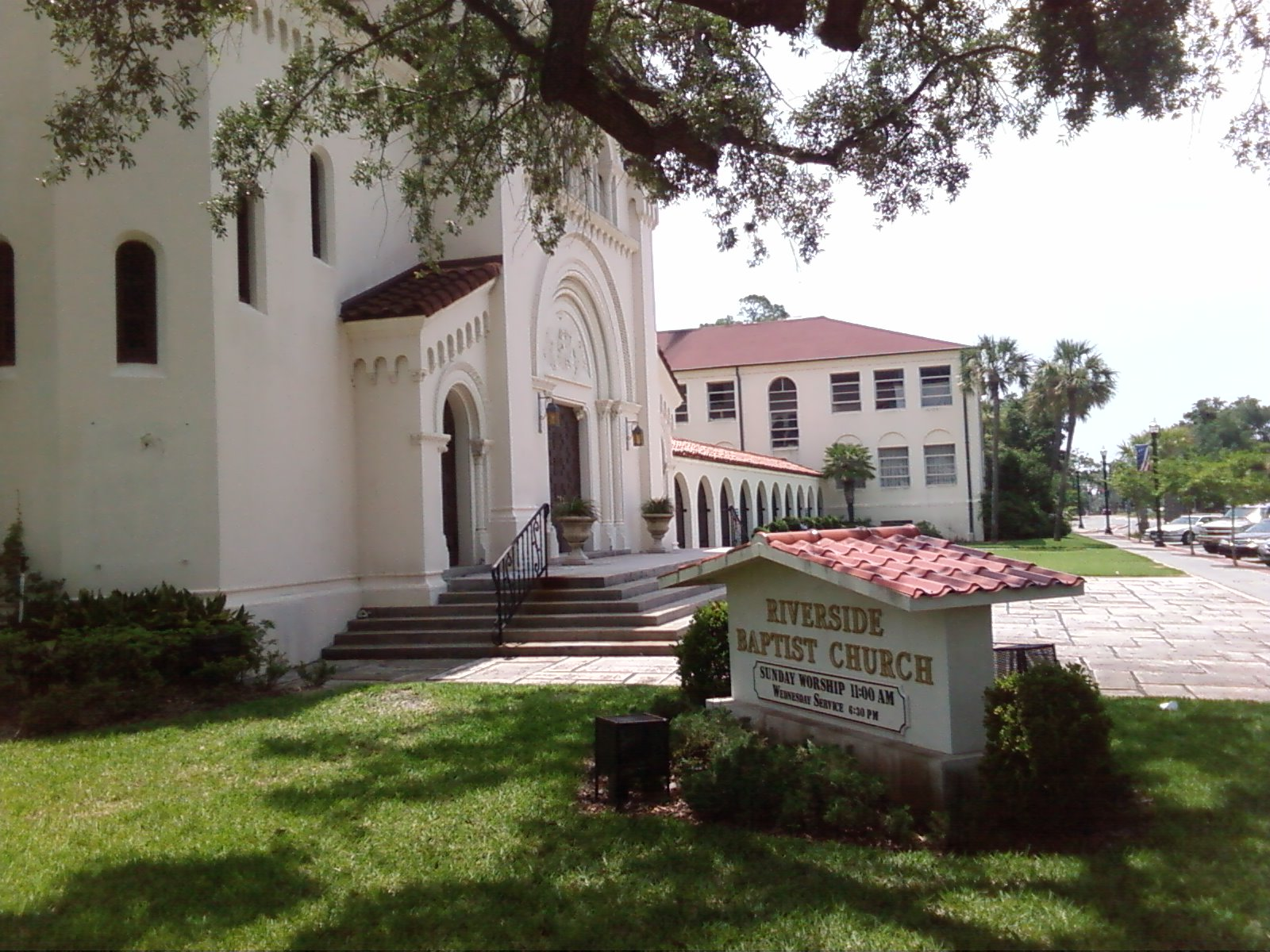
Riverside Baptist Church, Jacksonville, Florida (1926).

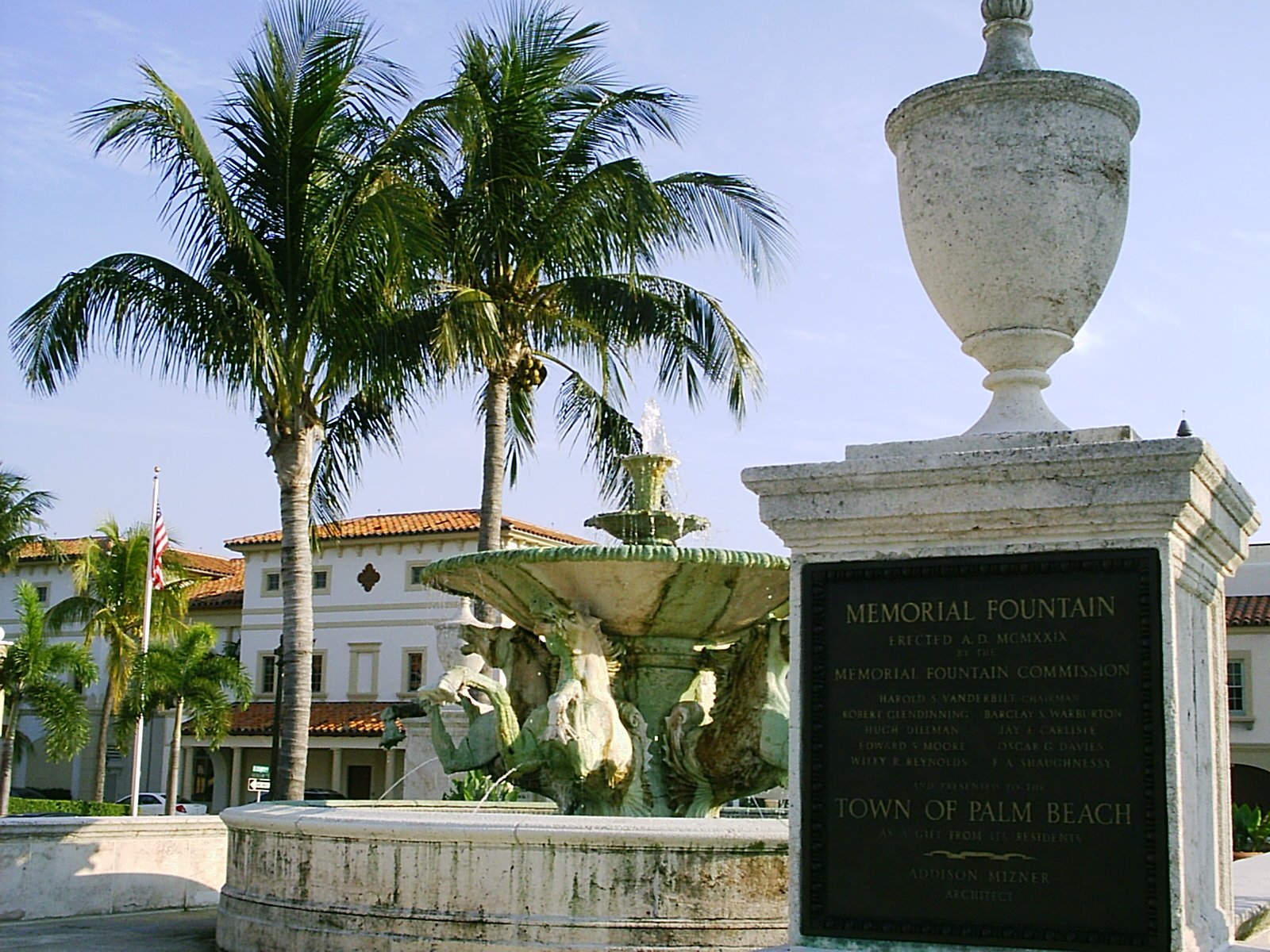
Memorial Fountain, Memorial Fountain Park, Palm Beach, Florida (1929).

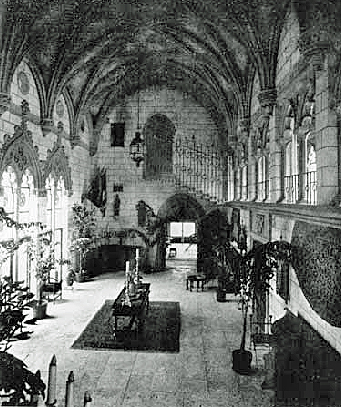
La Ronda, Great Hall.

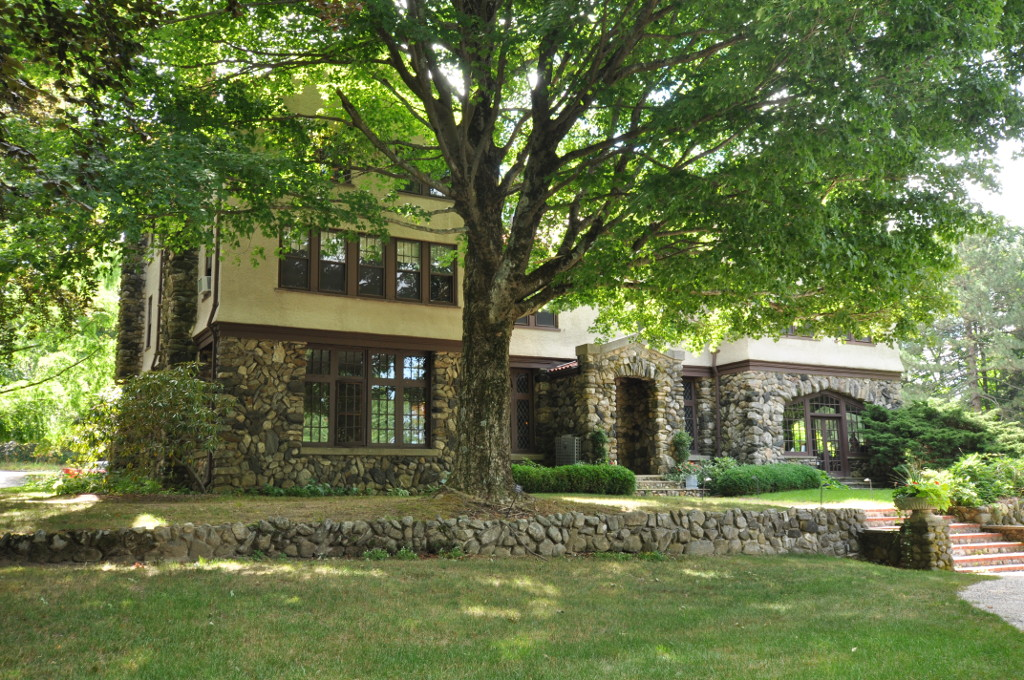
Rock Hall in Connecticut

== Archival material ==
The Mizner design scrapbooks and his complete library are available at the Society of the Four Arts Library in Palm Beach, Florida and available digitally from the Internet Archive. Material relating to Boca Raton may be found at the Boca Raton Historical Society; many are available on their Web site. A large number of architectural drawings are in the collections of the Historical Society of Palm Beach County. Sketchbooks, photo albums, and some letters are at the Oakland Museum of California, Oakland, California. A scrapbook from Guatemala is in the library of the University of Miami.

== See also ==
- Wilson Mizner (Addison's brother)
- Lansing Mizner (Addison's father)
- Boca Raton, Florida#Addison Mizner's resort town

== Bibliography ==
- Andree, Herb and McCall, Wayne, "Santa Barbara Architecture, From Spanish Colonial to Modern"; Santa Barbara, California: Capra Press, 1980
- Berlin, Irving and Robert Kimball and Linda Berlin Emmet. The Complete Lyrics of Irving Berlin. New York: Alfred A. Knopf, 2001.
- Craven, Jackie (January 2, 2018). "Spanish Style Homes in the New World. Mar-A-Lago and More Architecture Inspired by Spain". ThoughtCo. Archived from the original on January 14, 2018.
- Curl, Donald W. Mizner's Florida. Cambridge, MA: MIT Press, 1984.
- Curl, Donald W. and John P. Johnson. Boca Raton; A Pictorial History. Virginia Beach, VA: The Donning Company, 1990.
- Diedrich, Richard. The 19th Hole: Architecture of the Golf Clubhouse. Victoria, Australia: Images Publishing, 2008.
- Lynfield, Geoffry. "Theodore Pratt (1901–1969) a Reassessment". The Spanish River Papers XII (3), 1984. Archived January 17, 2014, at the Wayback Machine URL retrieved January 21, 2014
- Mizner, Addison. The Many Mizners. Chicago: Sears, 1932.
- Mizner, Addison with Ethel Mumford and Oliver Herford. The Cynic's Calendar of Revised Wisdom of 1903. San Francisco: P. Elder and M. Shepard, 1902.
- Mumford, Ethel Watts, Illustrated and Decorated by Ethel Watts Mumford and Addison Mizner. The Limerick Up to Date Book. San Francisco: Paul Elder, 1903
- Nolan, David. Fifty Feet in Paradise: The Booming of Florida. Harcourt Brace Jovanovich 1984
- Pratt, Theodore, The Story of Boca Raton; Great Outdoors, 1963
- Olendorf, William, Addison Mizner: A Sketchbook Raisonne of His Work; Farmington Hills, Michigan: Gale Group, 1985
- Orr, Christina, Addison Mizner; Architect of Dreams and Realities (1872–1933); Palm Beach: Norton Gallery and School of Art, 1977.
- Seebohm, Caroline, Boca Rococo: How Addison Mizner Invented Florida's Gold Coast; New York: Clarkson Potter, 2001
- Addison Mizner and Resort Architecture Archived May 13, 2008, at the Wayback Machine
- Vogt, Elizabeth E., "Montecito, California's Garden Paradise"; Santa Barbara, California: MIP Publishing, 1993
