= Monreal =

Monreal may refer to:

== Places ==
- Monreal, Navarre, a town in Navarre, Spain
- Monreal del Llano, a town in the province of Cuenca, Spain
- Monreal del Campo, a town in Aragón, Spain
- Monreal, Masbate, a municipality in the Philippines
- Monreal, Germany, a municipality in Rhineland-Palatinate, Germany

== Castle ==
- Monreal Castle, also called the Löwenburg, a castle above Monreal, Germany

== Other uses ==
- Monreal (surname)
