= Administration Buildings (Boca Raton, Florida) =

- U.S. National Register of Historic Places
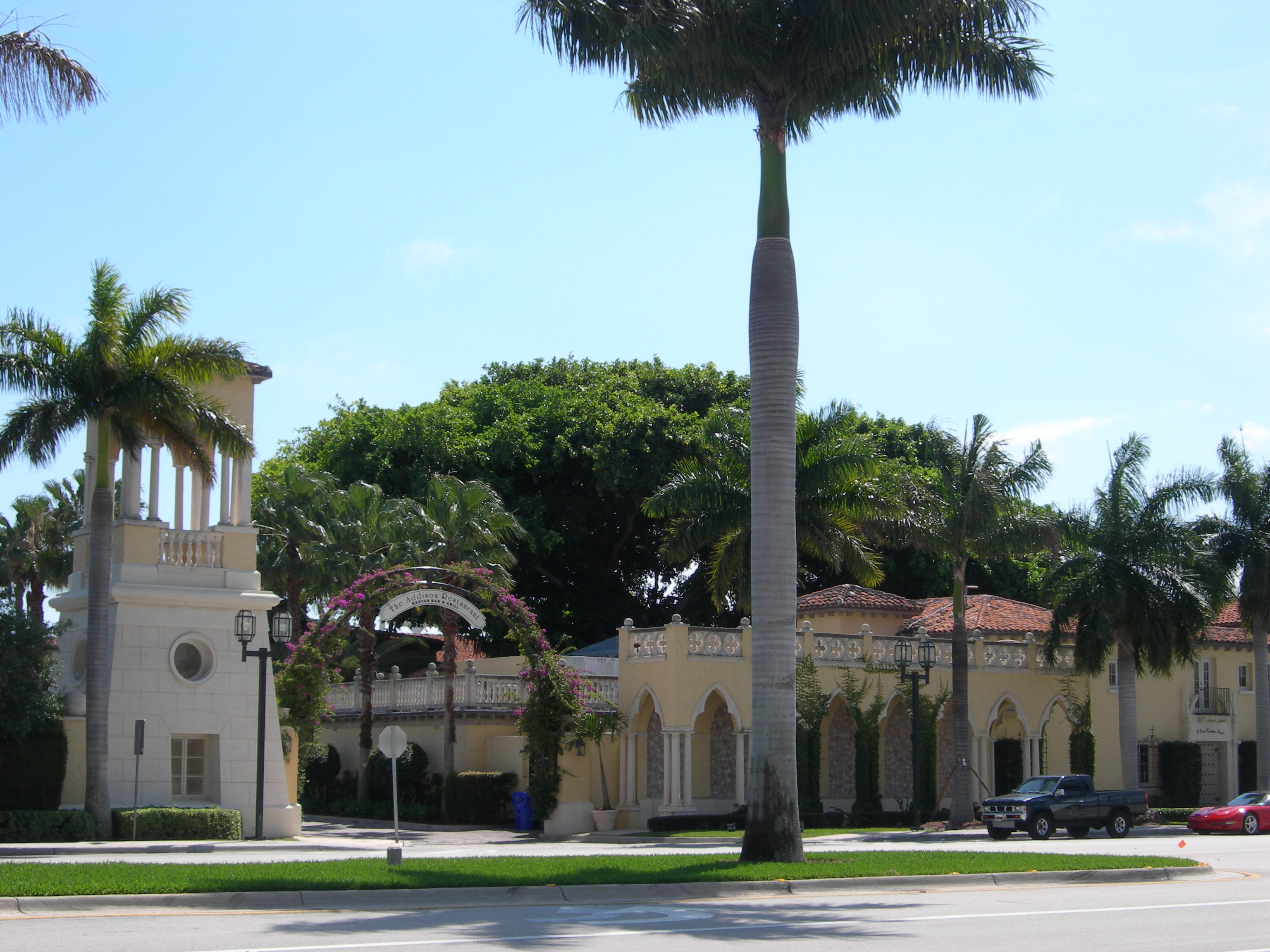
- Buildings as seen from Camino Real

- Location within Florida Location within the United States
- Location: Dixie Highway & Camino Real, Boca Raton, Palm Beach County, Florida
- Coordinates: 26°20′25.14″N 80°05′20.31″W
- Built: 1925
- Architect: Addison Mizner
- Architectural style: Mediterranean Revival
- NRHP reference No.: 85001372
- Added to NRHP: June 27, 1985

The Administration Buildings are a historic site in Boca Raton, Florida, United States. They are located at 2 East Camino Real. With both designed by well-known South Florida architect Addison Mizner in the mid-1920s, each of the Administration Buildings contain Mediterranean Revival-style features and are two stories in height. Mizner intended for these structures to house the offices for his Mizner Development Corporation and serve as prototypes for his plans for the then-new city of Boca Raton, but the end of the 1920s Florida land boom forced him to transfer the project to Clarence H. Heist in 1928. Nonetheless, the buildings remain important because transactions for thousands of acres of land occurred there under Mizner's ownership.

The Boca Raton Club used the structures for lodging its staff from 1928 to 1983. On June 27, 1985, the Administration Buildings were added to the National Register of Historic Places. Currently, the structures are known as The Addison, an event venue.

== History and description ==
Boca Raton was incorporated as a city on May 26, 1925. One month earlier, well-known South Florida architect Addison Mizner purchased just over 2 miles (3.2 km) of waterfront property and another 16,000 acres (6,500 ha) farther inland. Shortly after, Mizner and his Mizner Development Corporation began planning two buildings to serve as prototypes for his future designs in Boca Raton. In May 1925, the Thomas L. Holland Construction Company began erecting the north building, while the Harry Vought and Company started constructing the south building in mid-summer. However, neither business received permits for constructing their respective buildings, both valued at $50,000, until September.

By November 1925, the first administration building opened. Between December 1925 and May 1926, Marie Dressler, Charles Gilman Norris, Charles M. Schwab, and Stanford White's widow all visited the site following a publicity campaign by Harry Reichenbach. Located at 2 East Camino Real, both buildings have two stories and were designed in the Mediterranean Revival-style of architecture, while a courtyard sits between both structures. However, the 1920s Florida Land Boom ended by early 1927, which also halted additional projects by Mizner. Consequently, Alexander Green and Michael Zimny of the Florida Bureau of Historic Preservation noted that "when the Administration Buildings were photographed for the Florida Architecture of Addison Mizner later in the year, they stood deserted, a relic of a dream that had failed." Nevertheless, thousands of acres of land had been sold via transactions occurring within those structures.

Clarence H. Heist acquired the project from Mizner in 1928. The Administration Buildings then served as lodging for Boca Raton Club staff until 1983. On June 27, 1985, they were added to the U.S. National Register of Historic Places. One year earlier, Historic Tampa Hillsborough County Preservation Board director Stephanie Ferrell stated that the Administration Buildings "has not fared well. The current owner, the Arvida Corporation, says it wants to adaptively use the vacant structure, but it has left it untended and open to weather and vandals." Currently, the Administration Buildings are now known as The Addison, an event venue.

== See also ==
- National Register of Historic Places listings in Palm Beach County, Florida
- Fred C. Aiken House
