= El Mirasol (mansion) =

Building in Palm Beach, Florida, US

Coordinates: 26.72576°N 80.03507°W

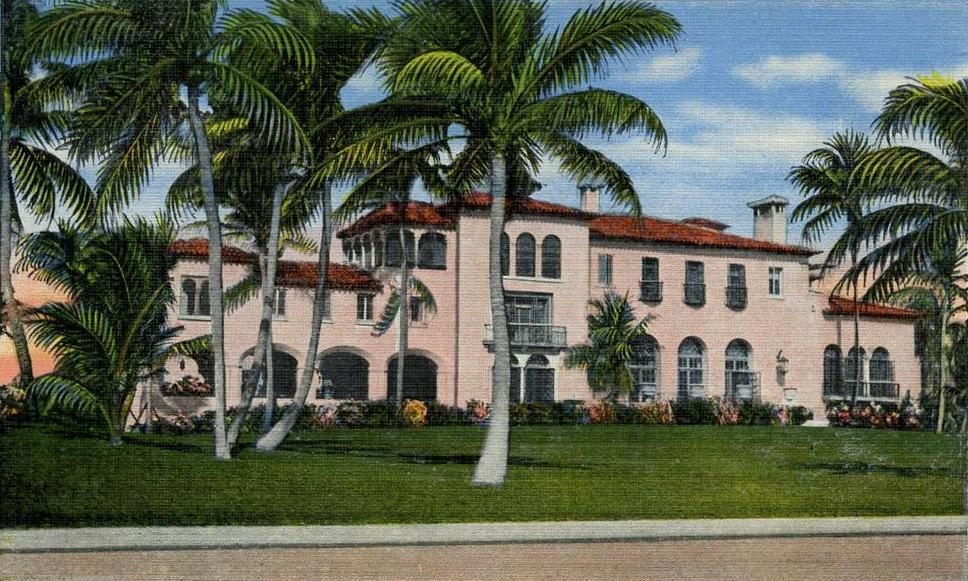
El Mirasol, Palm Beach, Florida (1919, demolished 1959) Photo: c.1920.

El Mirasol was a 37-room Spanish Colonial Revival mansion at 348 North Ocean Boulevard in Palm Beach, Florida.

Designed by architect Addison Mizner for financier Edward T. Stotesbury, it was completed in 1920.

Stotesbury's second wife Lucretia (Eva) Stotesbury was the one who convinced her husband to hire Mizner. She added on to the mansion several times. It extended from the Intracoastal to the ocean, two blocks. At the end, it included a 40-car garage, a tea house, an auditorium, and a private zoo.

The picnic sequence in the W. C. Fields silent film It's the Old Army Game (1926), which is extant, was shot on the lawn of the mansion.

El Mirasol (The Sunflower) was demolished in 1959.
