= Wise Guy (musical) =

Unproduced musical by Irving Berlin

Wise Guy, which had at different points the working titles (in approximate order) The Last Resorts, Palm Beach, The Mizner Story, and Sentimental Guy, is a musical whose music and lyrics were written by Irving Berlin between 1952 and 1956. It has never been produced.

The subject of the musical is Berlin's deceased friend, the famous Florida architect Addison Mizner, to a lesser extent Addison's younger brother and sometimes partner Wilson, and their friends and clients. Berlin had been an investor in Mizner's visionary but ultimately ruinous Boca Raton project, and there had been talk (but no serious plans) of Berlin setting up a nightclub in Boca Raton.

== The Last Resorts (1952) ==
Berlin's first, 1952 attempt to write a musical about the Mizners was called The Last Resorts, with an alternate title Palm Beach. It was "apparently based on Cleveland Amory's 1952 book, Last Resorts", and was written "with Amory". The Irving Berlin archives at the Library of Congress contains a synopsis of Act I, and lyrics for the following songs:

- Sittin' in the sun (counting my money) - also intended for White Christmas (1954), but not used
- The snobs on the wrong side of the track
- The top 400 people.

This project was set aside.

== Wise Guy (1956) ==
The project was reactivated after the 1953 publication of Alva Johnston's The Legendary Mizners (in England, The Incredible Mizners). Berlin worked with playwright S. N. Behrman on the project, also called Sentimental Guy and The Mizner Story; it was to have starred José Ferrer.

== Recorded songs from the musical ==
These songs are all featured on the album Unsung Irving Berlin and were unearthed from Berlin's files by the producer of the album, Bruce Kimmel. "Sentimental Guy" was sung by Laurie Beechman and "You're a Sucker for a Dame" was sung by Guy Haines.

"You're a Sentimental Guy" was written in December 1956. "Since Wise Guy's original title had been Sentimental Guy, this may be an example of the title song that gets cut when the name of a musical is changed." It was published in sheet music form in 1996. The lyrics compare life on Broadway with Westchester County ("Yonkers").

"Go Home and Tell It to your Wife" is a 1957 comedy duet which was originally meant to be sung by Perry Como and Mary Martin "in a television spectacular modeled after the Irving Berlin Music Box Reviews." That project fell through. It was also intended at one point for Wise Guy.
