= Boca Raton Old City Hall =

- U.S. National Register of Historic Places
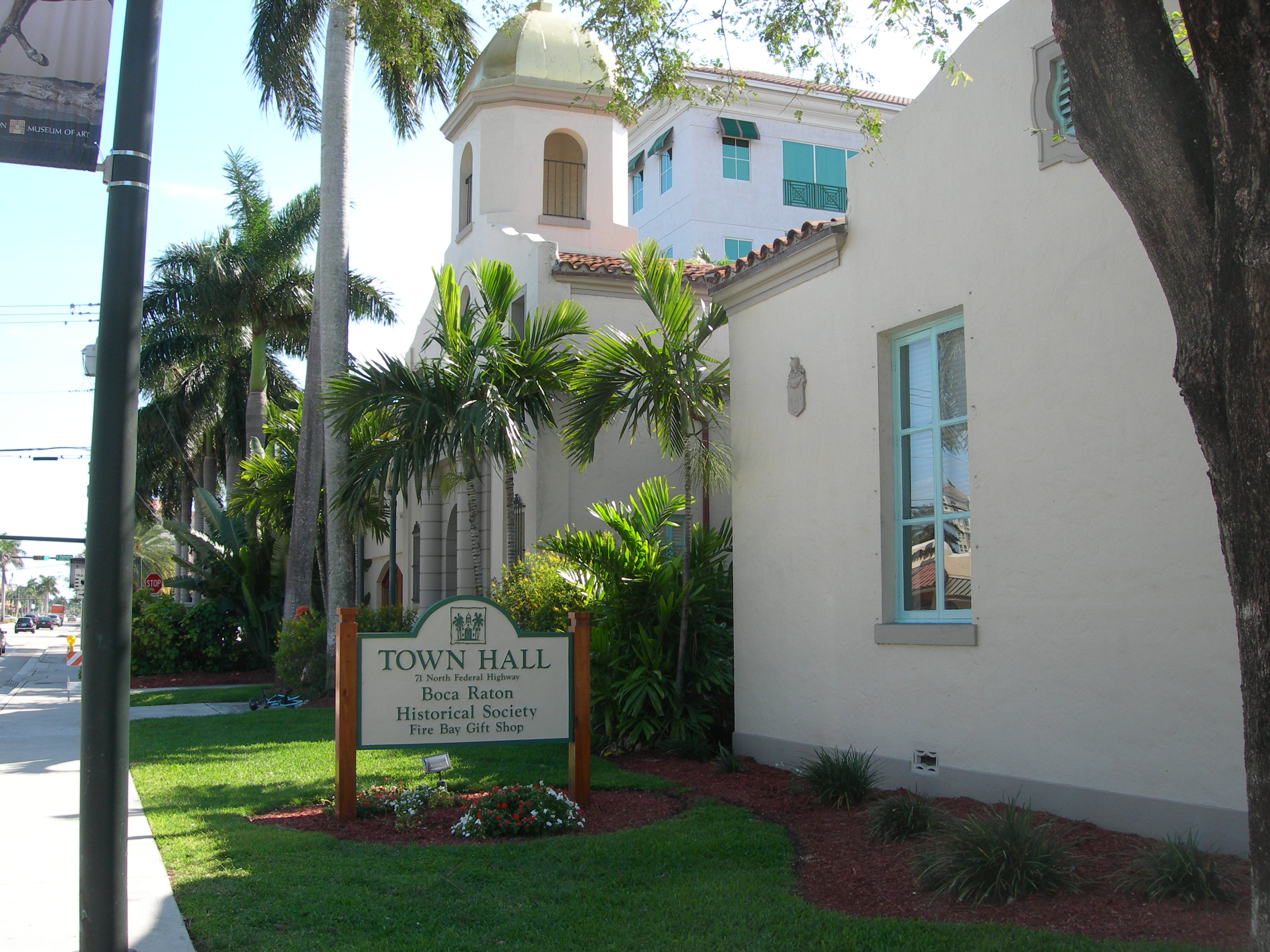
- Old City Hall, Boca Raton

- Location within Florida Location within the United States
- Location: 71 N. Federal Hwy., Boca Raton, Florida
- Coordinates: 26°21′3″N 80°5′13″W
- Area: 1 acre (0.40 ha)
- Built: 1926
- Built by: F. H. Link/J F. Cramer
- Architect: Addison Mizner/William E. Alsmeyer
- Architectural style: Late 19th And 20th Century Revivals, Mediterranean Revival
- NRHP reference No.: 80000958
- Added to NRHP: 16 October 1980

The Boca Raton Old City Hall (labeled as "Town Hall" on signs) is a historic site in Boca Raton, Florida, United States. It is located at 71 North Federal Highway. The original architect was Addison Mizner, who designed a two-story Mediterranean Revival-style structure. In addition to formerly being the Boca Raton City Hall, the building housed Boca Raton's police station, fire department, and library.

The former city hall now houses the Boca Raton Welcome Center and the Boca Raton History Museum. On October 16, 1980, it was added to the U.S. National Register of Historic Places. On April 18, 2012, the AIA's Florida Chapter placed it on its list of Florida Architecture: 100 Years. 100 Places as the Boca Raton Town Hall.

== History and description ==
On May 26, 1925, Boca Raton incorporated as a city. In the early days of the city, Mizner Development Corporation field offices served as the place for city council meetings. Well-known South Florida architect Addison Mizner bought about 16,000 acres (6,500 ha) of land and another 2 miles (3.2 km) along the waterfront to develop Boca Raton. Overall, over 3,500 workers contributed to constructing Mizner's projects in the city alone. Among the Mizner Development Corporation projects was the building of a permanent city hall. F. H. Link received the contract to erect the building in February 1926 for $106,300. Although Mizner desired a two-story structure, the city council tried to convince him to design the building with one-story.

However, later in 1926, the Florida land boom began dissipating, leading to construction being suspended from September to January 1927. At that time, J.F. Cramer of C and C Construction Company agreed to continue building the structure for $57,700 ($35,000 had already been spent by late 1926). Additionally, William E. Alsmeyer became the new architect. While it is difficult to determine to what extent Alsmeyer revised Mizner's plans, Rolla L. Queen of the Florida Division of Archives History and Records Management noted that "more than likely, major changes were made only to the interior design. The exterior changes probably resulted in a scaling down of the main facade plus the addition of columns at the main entrance. The south wing was altered to accommodate a fire engine."

In 1927, the Boca Raton City Hall opened and ultimately cost $102,981 to erect. The building is a two-story, three-bay structure of the Mediterranean Revival-style. A 45 feet (14 m)-tall, 50 feet (15 m)-long wooden camel was placed at the backside of the building, which led to national news coverage in April 1928. The purpose of constructing the wooden camel was to attract the attention of attendees to a Shriners convention in Miami. In total, the Boca Raton Old City Hall sits on roughly 1 acre (0.40 ha) of land.

In addition to being Boca Raton's city hall, the structure also served as the headquarters of fire and police departments, the fire chief's home, and a library for the woman's club. By the 1960s, the building became too crowded and ill-equipped to handle the growing city government. Consequently, another structure was erected and opened in 1964. Thereafter, the 1920s building at 71 North Federal Highway continued to be used by the Boca Raton Historical Society and some city government offices. On October 16, 1980, the Boca Raton Old City Hall was listed on the National Register of Historic Places. The AIA's Florida Chapter placed it on its list of Florida Architecture: 100 Years. 100 Places on April 18, 2012, as the Boca Raton Town Hall.

== Boca Raton History Museum ==
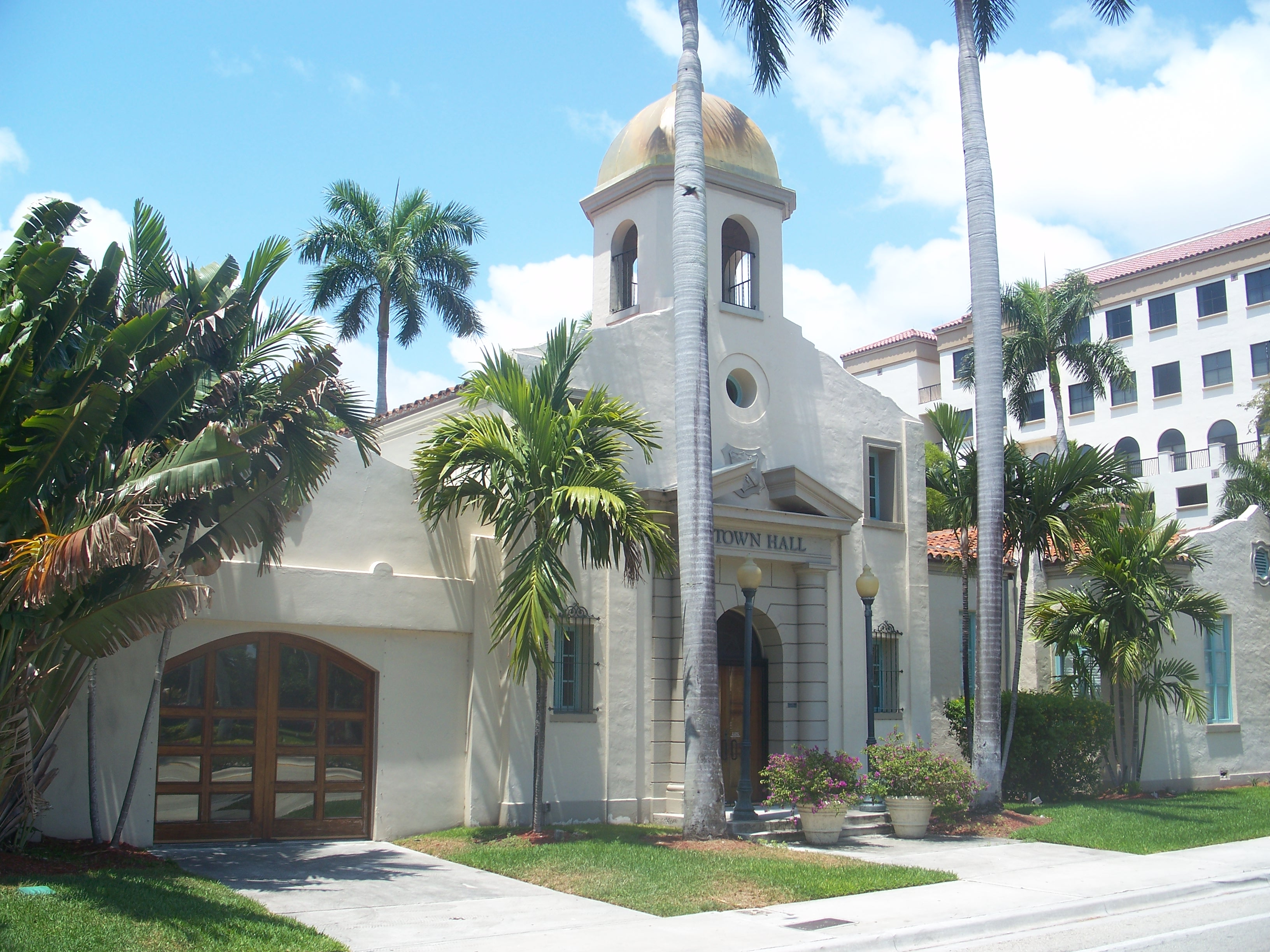
Boca Raton History Museum, formerly the city's town hall

The Boca Raton History Museum is located in downtown Boca Raton, Florida, at the old city hall. Sponsored by the Boca Raton Historical Society, whose offices and library are located there, it is also the welcome center for Boca Raton. Some of Addison Mizner's elegant architectural details have been preserved, together with antiques, some of them Spanish, from his collection. (Because of Mizner's bankruptcy in late 1926, the building was completed by architect William E. Alsmeyer.) It also housed Boca's first fire bay (fire station), which now serves as the museum's gift shop, Boca Raton's police station, and its first library. A small second floor, not currently open to the public, provided housing for the fire chief. The Boca Express Train Museum, a few blocks away, is also operated by the Historical Society.
