= La Ronda (estate) =

Mansion and estate

Coordinates: 40.050048°N 75.304107°W

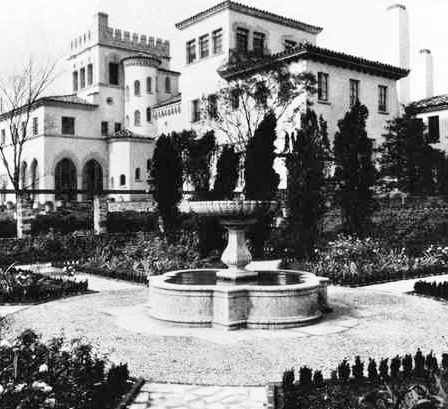
La Ronda. Lower Merion Historical Society, William Morrison Collection

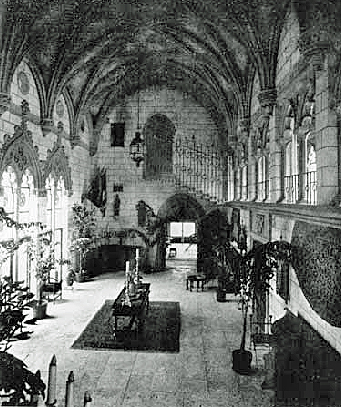
The Great Hall in La Ronda. Lower Merion Historical Society, William Morrison Collection

La Ronda was a mansion and estate in Bryn Mawr, Pennsylvania from 1929 to 2009. It was originally the home of Percival E. Foerderer, who ran a leather-manufacturing business, and his wife Ethel Brown. The 17,500-square-foot (1,630 m^{2}) Philadelphia Main Line mansion was the last commission by the early 20th century architect Addison Mizner based in Palm Beach, Florida. The residence was built by J.S. Cornell & Son.

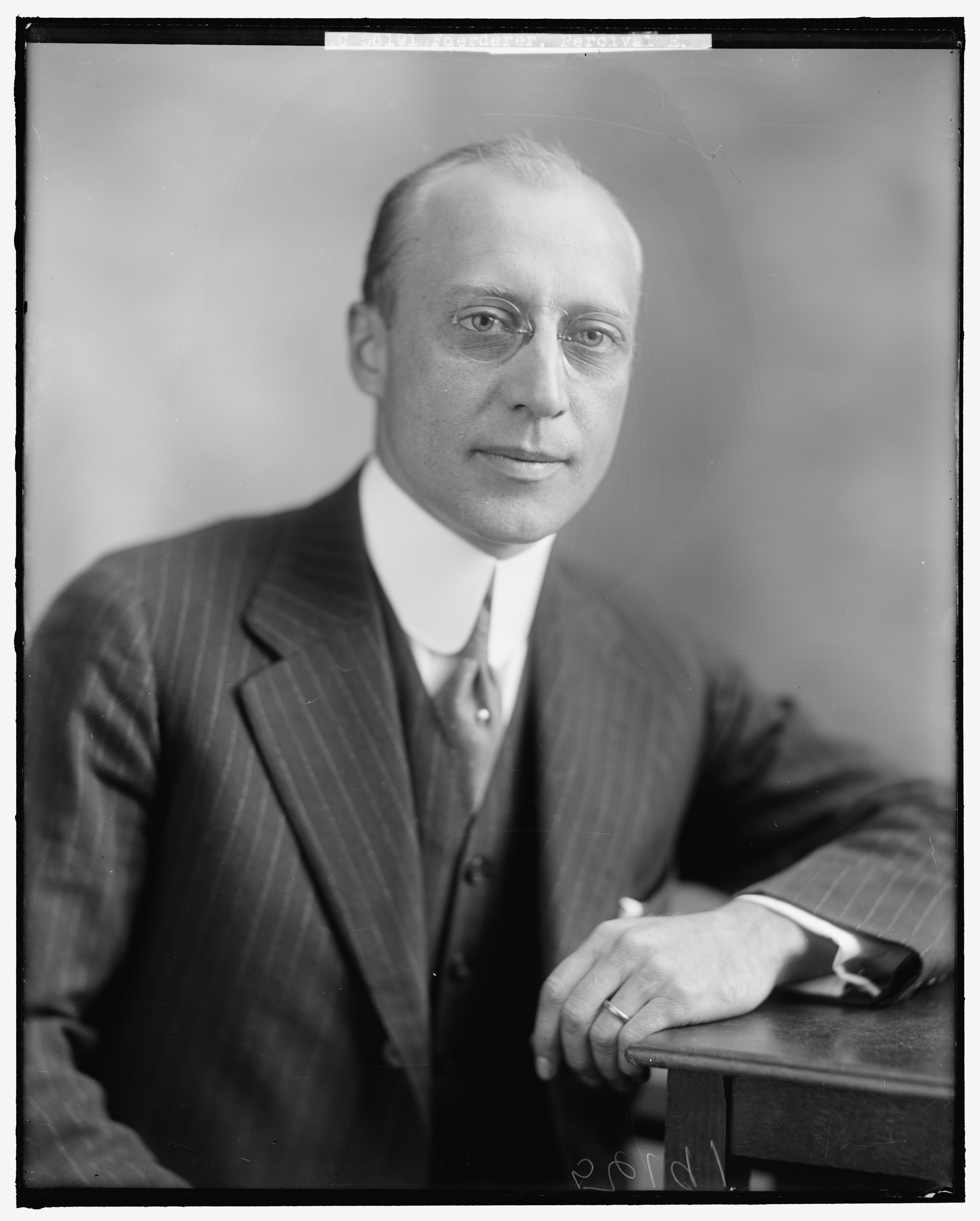
Foerdere

== Description ==
Completed in 1929, the La Ronda estate originally consisted of 233 acres (94 ha) of grounds and gardens. The Mediterranean Revival and Spanish Gothic Revival architecture styled residence had fifty-one rooms, including twenty-one bedrooms. Mizner's artisan production company created much of the hardware, fittings, furnishings, and decorative elements in the same styles for an integrated aesthetic.

== Later history ==
Following Percival Foerderer's death in 1969, the Foerderer family sold the estate to Villanova University. Since that time, a series of subsequent owners sold the grounds of most of the original estate, and new single homes and townhouses were built. By 2009, the property attached to the La Ronda mansion had shrunk to 3.2 acres (1.3 ha).

Philip E. Franks, a Philadelphia architect who inspected La Ronda in July 2009, wrote "This is a great building extremely worthy of protection and of embracing as a cultural treasure; the building is in remarkably good condition for its 80 years. It has survived with little excessive wear and tear to reflect its age and usage. Its previous occupants loved and respected the building. It has not been seriously vandalized, abused or neglected… To have this building demolished and replaced rather than adapted and reused would be to suffer a tragic loss due to unfortunate ignorance and misguided hubris."

== Demolition ==
In March 2009, La Ronda was sold for $6 million. The new owner, whose identity was hidden behind a corporate front, applied for a demolition permit and announced plans to tear down the La Ronda mansion and build a new 10,000-square-foot (930 m^{2}) house.

Joseph Kuhls, a lawyer retained by the anonymous owner, justified this decision by stating that the existing mansion was not air conditioned, that the current owner had the right to do what he wanted with the property, and that when Foerderer built La Ronda in the 1920s, an 1880s farmhouse was destroyed.

The owner of the estate was reported to be Joseph Kestenbaum, president and chief executive of ELB Capital Management.

=== Preservation efforts ===
Lower Merion Township's historical commission recommended that the board of commissioners reject the request for a demolition permit. The Preservation Alliance for Greater Philadelphia made an appeal to the owner, whose name had, at that point, not been made public. Other groups fighting to prevent the demolition included the National Trust for Historic Preservation and the Philadelphia chapter of the American Institute of Architects.

On June 3, 2009, the Lower Merion commissioners approved demolition but issued a 90-day delay. The Lower Merion Historical Society attempted to raise $7 million to buy La Ronda and establish a foundation to preserve the building.

The Lower Merion Historical Society's efforts to raise funds and purchase the mansion were not successful. In August 2009, Benjamin Wohl, a Florida real estate developer, offered to buy La Ronda and move it to an adjoining lot to be his second home. This would save the current owner an estimated $300,000 in demolition costs. Wohl lives in Palm Beach, Florida, in a Mizner home that he moved to prevent its demolition. Wohl stated that he had a purchase agreement for land adjoining the La Ronda property, and that he had contracted with an engineering firm to assess the feasibility of moving the house. Engineers stated that though it would be complex, moving the house was possible.

In August 2009, it was revealed that Joseph and Sharon Kestenbaum of Penn Valley, Pennsylvania were the new owners. Wohl was not successful in negotiations with the Kestenbaums. After the Kestenbaums and the previous owner completed extensive interior salvaging, demolition of La Ronda commenced on October 1, 2009.
