= Riverside Baptist Church =

Historic church in Florida, United States

- Riverside Church at Park and King
- U.S. National Register of Historic Places
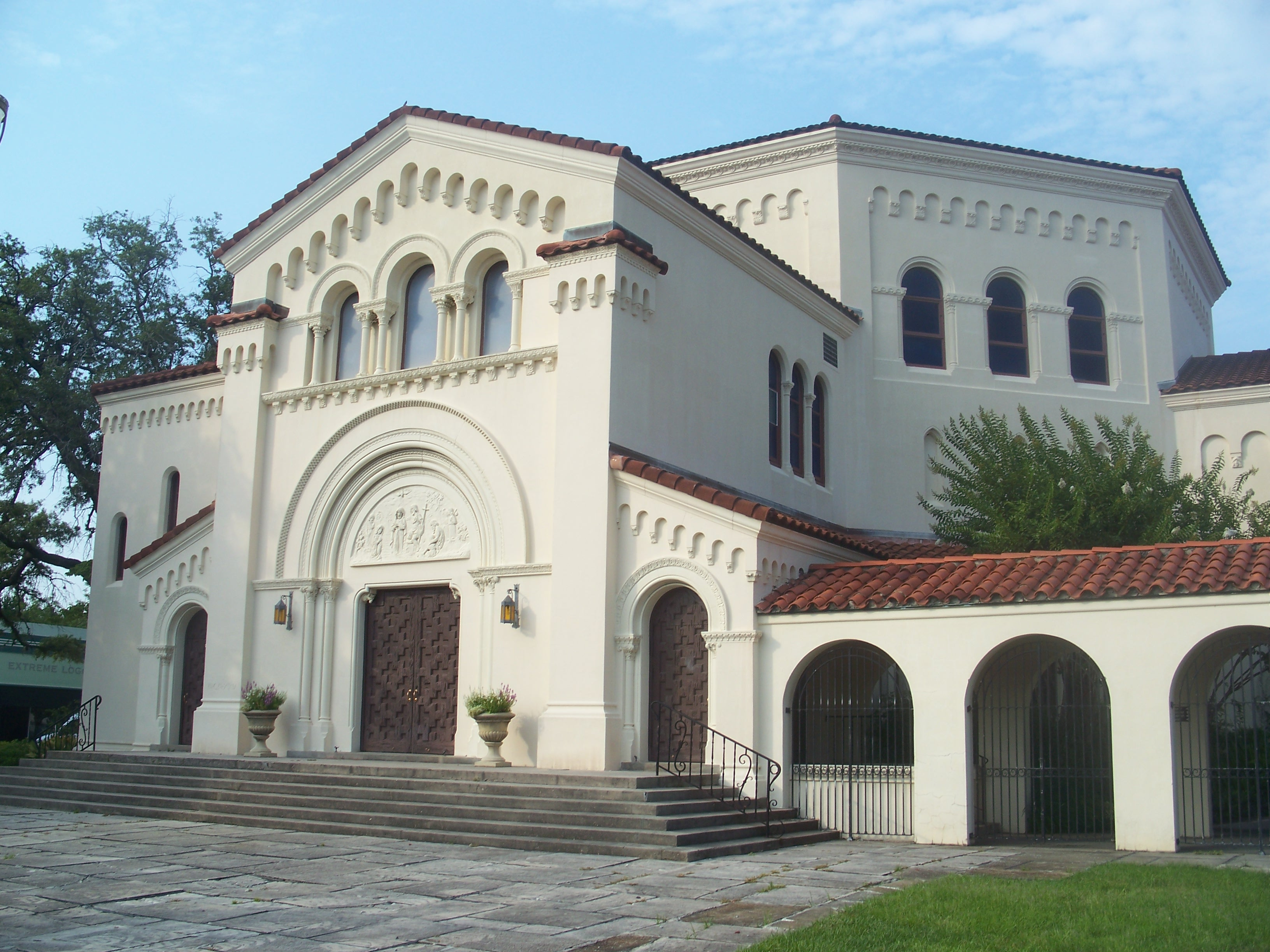

- Location within Florida Location within the United States
- Location: Jacksonville, Florida, USA
- Coordinates: 30°18′37″N 81°41′35″W
- Built: 1926
- Architect: Addison Mizner
- Architectural style: Late 19th And 20th Century Revivals
- NRHP reference No.: 72000312
- Added to NRHP: September 22, 1972

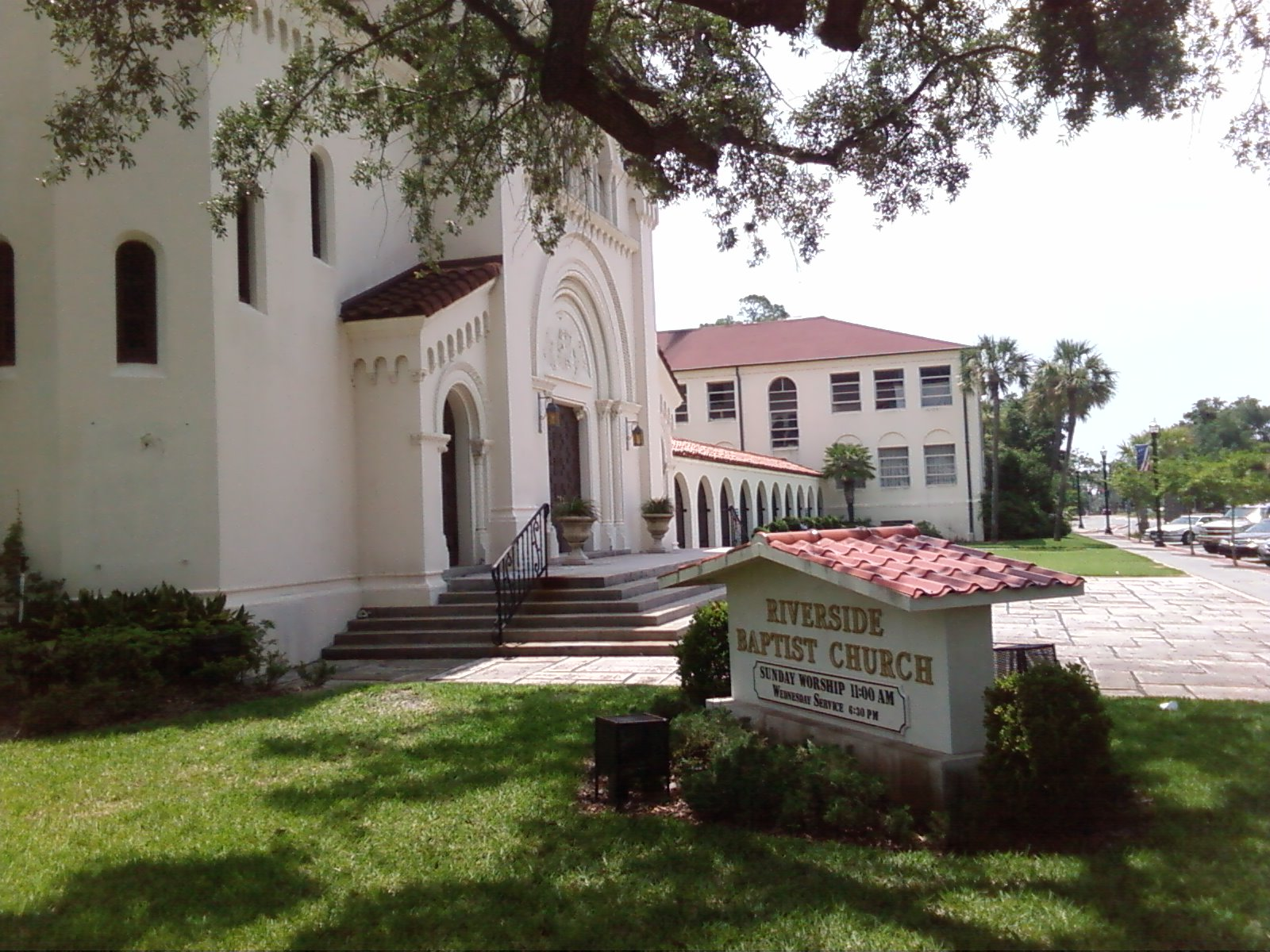

Riverside Church at Park and King, formerly known as Riverside Baptist Church, is a progressive Baptist church located in Jacksonville, Florida, at 2650 Park Street in the Riverside neighborhood. It is affiliated with the Association of Welcoming and Affirming Baptists, Alliance of Baptists and the Cooperative Baptist Fellowship.

== History ==
Designed by architect Addison Mizner and completed in 1926, it was added to the U.S. National Register of Historic Places on September 22, 1972. On April 18, 2012, the American Institute of Architects's Florida Chapter placed the building on its list of Florida Architecture: 100 Years. 100 Places.

== Theology ==
Riverside Church at Park and King is a progressive ecumenical Church in the Baptist tradition, serving a small but diverse congregation. According to the church website, the congregation is "an inclusive, open and affirming community of believers without regard for race, sexual orientation, ethnicity, age, gender, or disability, all with a diversity of gifts and experiences united under the Lordship of Jesus Christ." It is associated with the Association of Welcoming and Affirming Baptists. As a progressive Baptist church, Riverside welcomes women and LGBTQIA+ people to serve as pastors and deacons, appointing its first openly transgender deacon in November of 2022. The church is fully welcoming to LGBTQIA+ members. Riverside Baptist Church is a partner church with the Alliance of Baptists and the Cooperative Baptist Fellowship.

== Conflict with the Florida Baptist Convention ==
In 2009, Dr. John Sullivan, executive director of the Florida Baptist Convention, requested a meeting with Riverside's pastor at that time, Rev. David Holladay. The purpose of this meeting was to discuss Riverside's acceptance of LGBTQ people. Riverside accepts homosexuality as a legitimate God-given identity, while the Florida Baptist Convention defines it as sinful. The meeting ended with the two parties agreeing to disagree. Riverside Baptist Church no longer identifies itself as a Southern Baptist-affiliated church.

== The Building ==
The sanctuary combines Romanesque, Byzantine, and Spanish elements, and is a splendid example of what is colloquially called the "Florida Spanish" style. It is one and a half stories, limestone with gabled and hipped tile roof sections, a double-door entrance beneath compound round arch, and sculptured tympanum. The design is believed to be Mizner's only religious structure. The radical nature of the design caused the loss of some members after its completion.
