= WFLA (Boca Raton, Florida) =

Radio station in Boca Raton, Florida (1927)

- Boca Raton, Florida; United States
- Broadcast area: Palm Beach County, Florida
- Branding: The Voice of Tropical America

Programming
- Format: Music, news, real estate advertising

Ownership
- Owner: Boca Raton Radio Corporation

History
- First air date: February 5, 1927
- Last air date: August 1927
- Former frequencies: 680 kHz (1927); 1410 kHz (1927)

Technical information
- Power: 1,000 watts

WFLA was an AM radio station in Boca Raton, Florida, owned in 1927 by the Boca Raton Radio Corporation and funded by the Mizner Development Corporation. It was created to promote a land development project headed by Addison Mizner, and was intended be heard in "most of the eastern United States".

== History ==
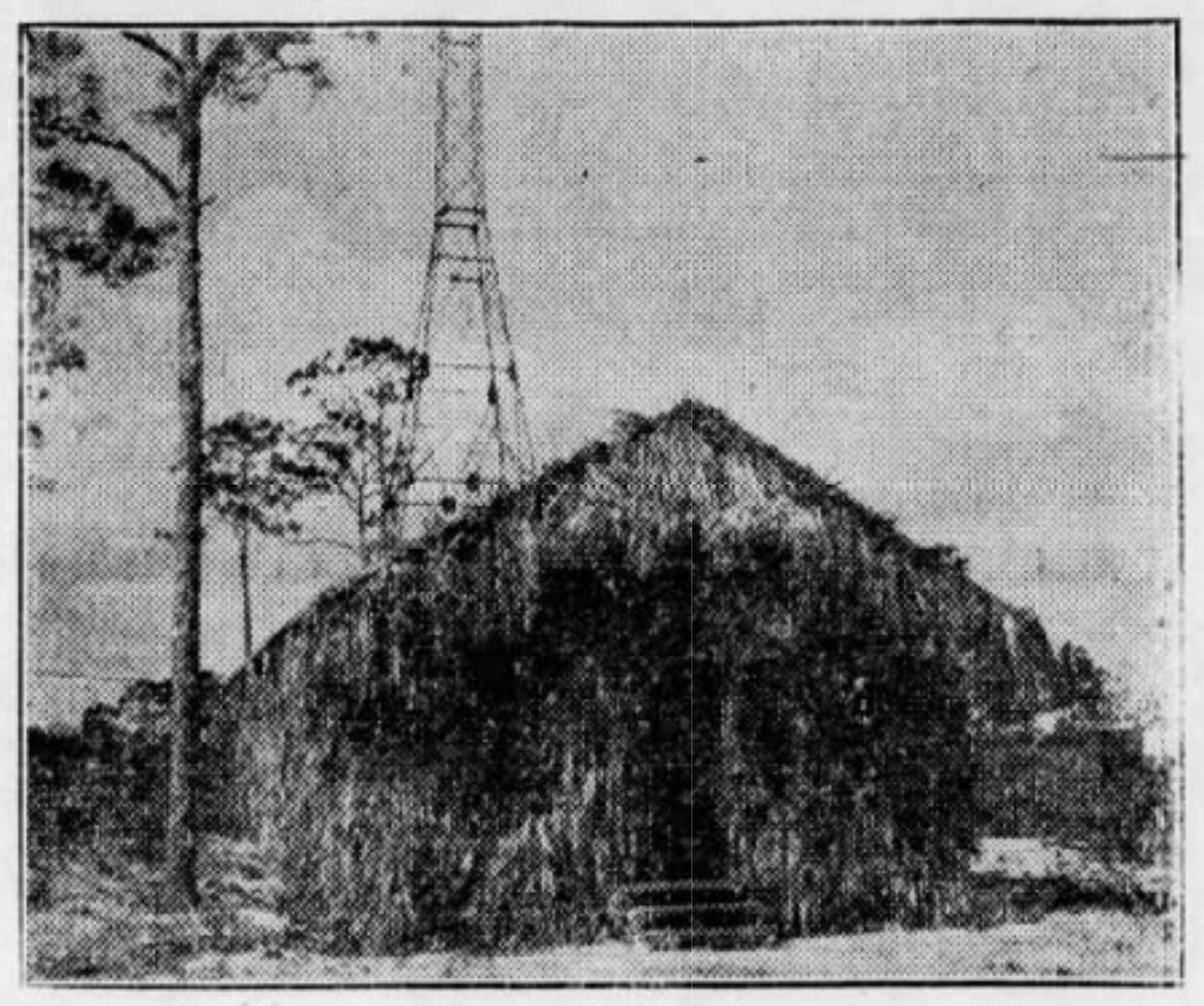
WFLA's studio, with the roof and walls covered by palmetto fronds.

The creation of a Boca Raton station with the call sign of "WFLA" was announced more than a year before it was actually authorized. In October 1921 it was written that WFLA would begin broadcasts on November 1. In November 1925, it was again prematurely declared by the Minzer Development Corporation that WFLA would debut the following January 1 as "one of the largest in the world" in order to "broadcast Florida features throughout the United States". At this time, it was stated that the programming would be "local news and regular weather and stock market reports" and "concerts by the famous Yerkes Flotilla orchestra", in addition to "noted vocal soloists and lectures on Florida", "a modern adaptation of the folk songs of the Seminole Indians", "sporting and athletic events of importance" and "regular church services and sacred music" on Sundays. (Irving Berlin was an investor in the Mizner Development Corporation, and Mizner referred at one point to a planned Irving Berlin nightclub in Boca Raton, so in the opinion of one reviewer it might have been Berlin's "modern adaptations" that were contemplated). It was later announced that the Palm Beach Post and the New York Times would share a news summary program.

The planned station faced a possible obstacle in getting licensed. At this time radio stations were regulated by the Department of Commerce, and Secretary Herbert Hoover had recently announced that, due to overcrowding, no additional stations would be authorized. However, the radio engineer supervising the installation, George Sheffield, expressed confidence that Hoover would allow the station to be established on a planned frequency of 1190 kHz.

Moreover, the situation radically changed on April 16, 1926, when Judge James H. Wilkerson ruled that the 1912 Radio Act, under which the Commerce Department had been regulating radio, did not provide for limiting the number of broadcasting licenses issued, or permit the designation of transmitting frequencies. The U.S. government reviewed whether to appeal this decision, but Acting Attorney General William J. Donovan sided with the original decision.

Taking advantage of the temporary lapse in government authority, in January 1927 WFLA was established as a new station, operated by Boca Raton Radio Corporation with a self-assigned wavelength of 440 meters (corresponding to choice frequency of 680 kHz) and a transmitter power of 1,000 watts. Two 206-foot (63 m) steel towers were constructed 3 miles (4.8 km) west of the Cloister Inn, in order to support WFLA's transmission antenna. The sides and roof of a co-located studio were covered with a thatch of palmetto fronds, evidence, according to one reviewer, that "no money remained to build conventional studios". The station was located at the corner of Palmetto Park Road and what today is NW 4th Avenue, in Boca Raton.

Following a series of test transmissions, the station made its formal debut broadcast as "The Voice of Tropical America" on the evening of February 5, 1927. At the time it was announced that "for the rest of the season" the station would broadcast nightly concerts, with the exception of Sunday, from 8 o'clock until midnight.

In March 1927, government oversight of radio assignments was restored with the establishment of the Federal Radio Commission (FRC). The FRC issued temporary assignments effective May 3, 1927, with WFLA moved to an undesirable "high band" frequency of 1410 kHz, although still with 1,000 watts.

The Minzer Corporation went into bankruptcy in 1926, and WFLA in Boca Raton was deleted on August 5, 1927. This allowed a Clearwater station to adopt the abandoned call letters, as it changed its call sign from WFHH to WFLA. In November 1927 it was announced that the remaining Minzer Development assets had been purchased by Clarence H. Geist.
