= Rock Hall (Colebrook, Connecticut) =

- U.S. National Register of Historic Places
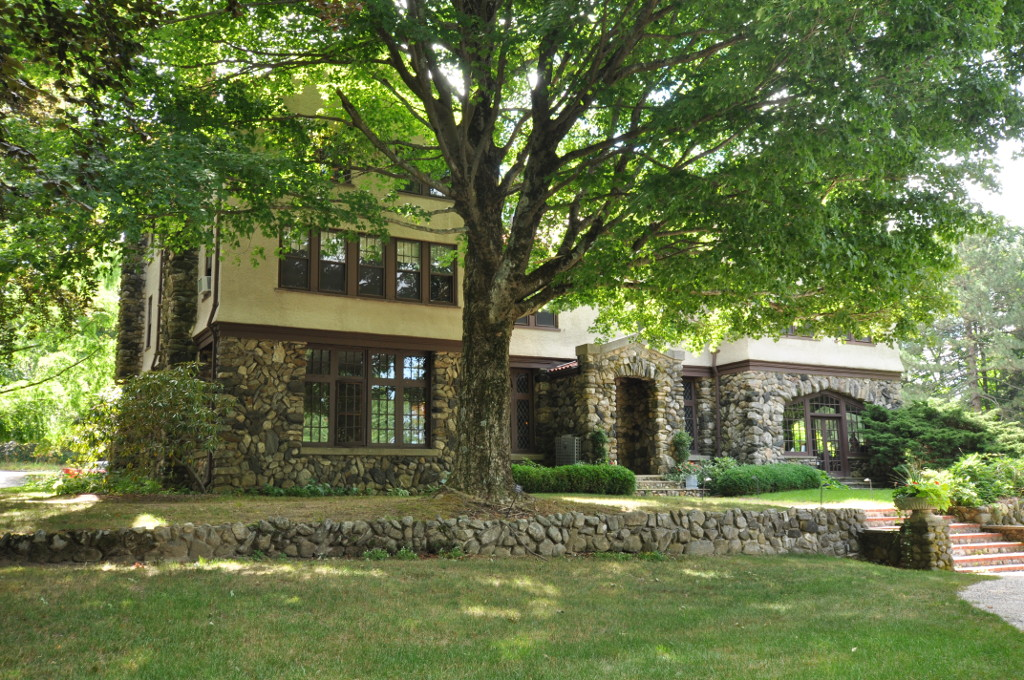

- Location within Connecticut Location within the United States
- Location: 19 Rock Hall Road, Colebrook, Connecticut
- Coordinates: 41.9840°N 73.1368°W
- Area: 22.7 acres (9.2 ha)
- Built: 1911
- Architect: Mizner, Addison
- Architectural style: Tudor Revival
- NRHP reference No.: 10000495
- Added to NRHP: June 7, 2010

Rock Hall is a circa 1912 Tudor Revival house at 19 Rock Hall Road in Colebrook, Connecticut. The 10,000-square-foot (930 m^{2}) building was designed by the architect Addison Mizner of Palm Beach, Florida, originally as a home for Jerome Alexandre and his wife Violet Adelaide Oakley. It is reportedly Mizner's only surviving work in the northern United States, and was listed on the National Register of Historic Places in 2010. It is now a hotel.

== Description and history ==
Rock Hall stands on a rural lane in southwestern Colebrook, on 22.5 acres (9.1 ha) that are a remnant of the original 175-acre (71 ha) country estate. The property includes grounds whose landscaping retains some of its original character, as well as the main house and several period outbuildings. The house is a large H-shaped three-story structure, with an exterior of rubble stone and Tudor style stucco. The sections of the H are covered by gabled roofs, with flat-roof sections at the ends. The downstairs public spaces are finished in a variety of different styles, while the upstairs bedrooms and servant quarters are generally in the Georgian Revival style.

Jerome Alexandre's mother-in-law, Mary Oakley, purchased a 175-acre farm in Colebrook in 1909, and deeded it to Alexandre two years later. Construction of Rock Hall began soon afterward, supervised by Addison Mizner, then early in his illustrious career. The design of the interior was intended to suggest that the house had grown organically, rather than by deliberate design. The house was used by the Alexandres only until 1919, and was sold out of the family in 1922. The estate was broken up in 1966. THe house underwent restoration beginning in 2005, and was opened as a hotel in 2007.

== See also ==
- National Register of Historic Places listings in Litchfield County, Connecticut
