= Monreal (surname) =

Monreal is a Navarrese surname, originally given to people from Monreal in Sangüesa. Notable people with the surname include:

- Antonny Monreal (born 1994), Mexican footballer
- Diego Monreal (born 2002), Chilean footballer
- Iñigo Monreal (born 1974), Spanish track and field athlete
- Josepablo Monreal (born 1996), Chilean footballer
- Nacho Monreal (born 1986), Spanish footballer
- Ricardo Monreal (born 1960), Mexican politician
