= Alva Johnston (journalist) =

American journalist (1888–1950)

Alva Johnston (August 1, 1888 – November 23, 1950) was an American journalist and biographer who won a Pulitzer Prize for journalism in 1923. As a contributor at The New Yorker he was credited with helping to establish the profile as a journalistic form.

== Biography ==
Johnston was born in Sacramento, California.

He started out at the Sacramento Bee in 1906. From 1912 to 1928 he wrote for The New York Times, from 1928 to 1932 for the New York Herald Tribune, and then he wrote articles for The Saturday Evening Post and The New Yorker magazines. He won the 1923 Pulitzer Prize for Reporting for "his reports of the proceedings of the convention of the American Association for the Advancement of Science held in Cambridge, Massachusetts, in December, 1922."

He died on November 23, 1950, in Bronxville, New York.

== Works ==
- The Great Goldwyn (Random House, 1937) — about Samuel Goldwyn.
- The Case of Erle Stanley Gardner (William Morrow, 1947) — originally published in The Saturday Evening Post.
- The Legendary Mizners (Farrar, Straus and Young, 1953), illustrated by Reginald Marsh — about Addison and Wilson Mizner, and based on Johnston's writings in The New Yorker.. The work has been superseded by later biographies.
