= Flattop Peak =

Mountain in British Columbia, Canada

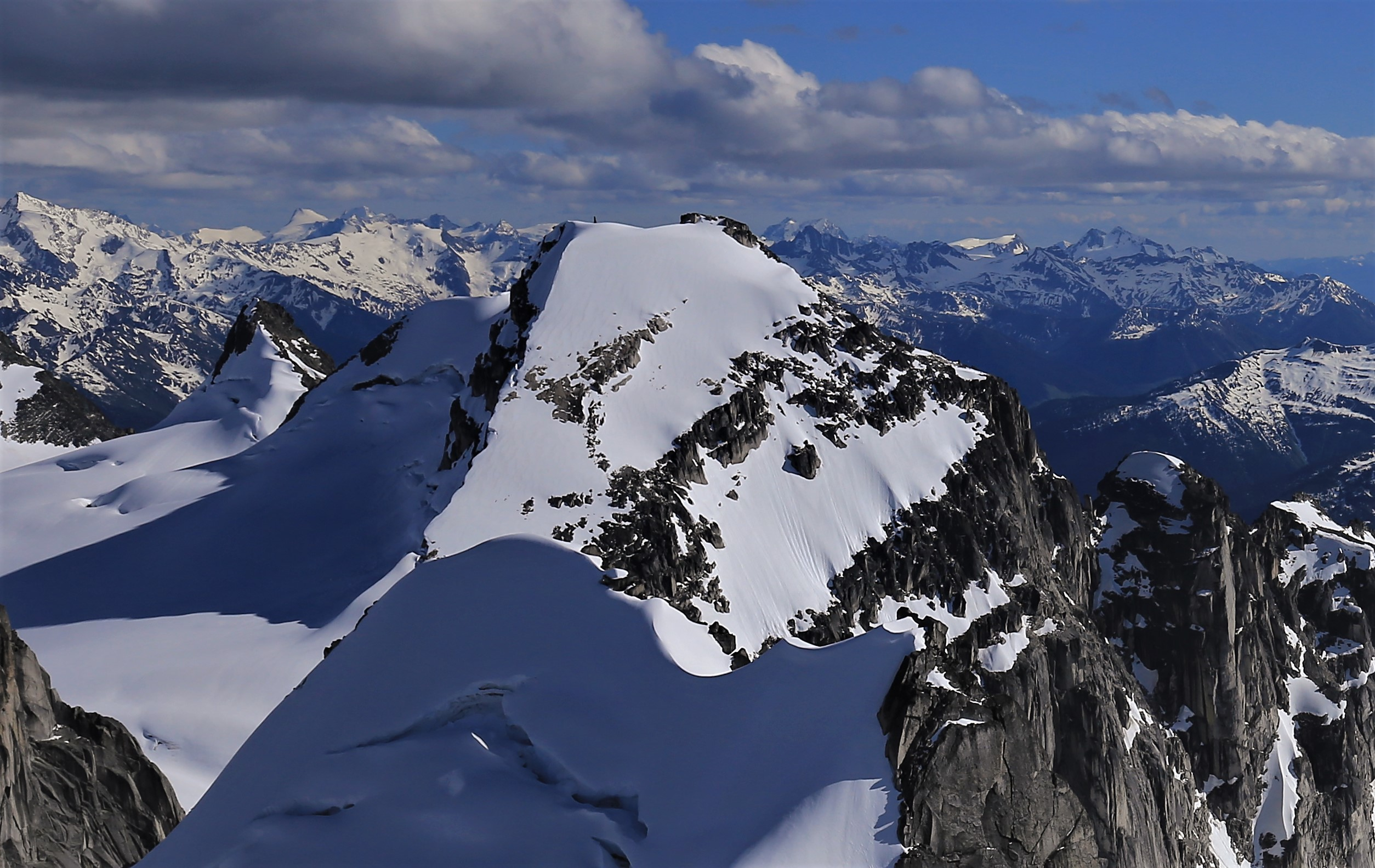
- North aspect

Highest point
- Elevation: 3,063 m (10,049 ft)
- Prominence: 182 m (597 ft)
- Parent peak: Howser Peak (3,094 m)
- Isolation: 1.17 km (0.73 mi)
- Listing: Mountains of British Columbia
- Coordinates: 50°42′46″N 116°47′42″W

Geography
- Location within British Columbia Location within Canada
- Interactive map of Flattop Peak
- Country: Canada
- Province: British Columbia
- District: Kootenay Land District
- Protected area: Bugaboo Provincial Park
- Parent range: Purcell Mountains; The Bugaboos
- Topo map: NTS 82K10 Howser Creek

Geology
- Rock age: 135 Million years ago
- Rock type: Granodiorite

Climbing
- First ascent: 1930

Flattop Peak is a 3,063-metre (10,049-foot) summit in British Columbia, Canada.

== Description ==
Flattop is located in The Bugaboos, west of the Bugaboo Glacier along the southern boundary of Bugaboo Provincial Park. Precipitation runoff from Flattop Peak drains east into Bugaboo Creek which is a tributary of the Columbia River; as well as west to Duncan River via East Creek. Flattop Peak is more notable for its steep rise above local terrain than for its absolute elevation as topographic relief is significant with the summit rising 1,660 meters (5,446 ft) above East Creek in 3 km (1.9 mi). The nearest higher neighbor is line parent Howser Peak, 1.21 km (0.75 mi) to the southeast.

== History ==
The peak's descriptive name was applied by Eaton Cromwell, who made the first ascent of the summit with Peter Kaufmann on August 10, 1930. The mountain's toponym was officially adopted on June 9, 1960, by the Geographical Names Board of Canada.

== Climate ==
Based on the Köppen climate classification, Flattop Peak is located in a subarctic climate zone with cold, snowy winters, and mild summers. Winter temperatures can drop below −20 °C with wind chill factors below −30 °C. This climate supports the Bugaboo Glacier on the peak's east slope and an unnamed glacier on the south slope.

== Gallery ==
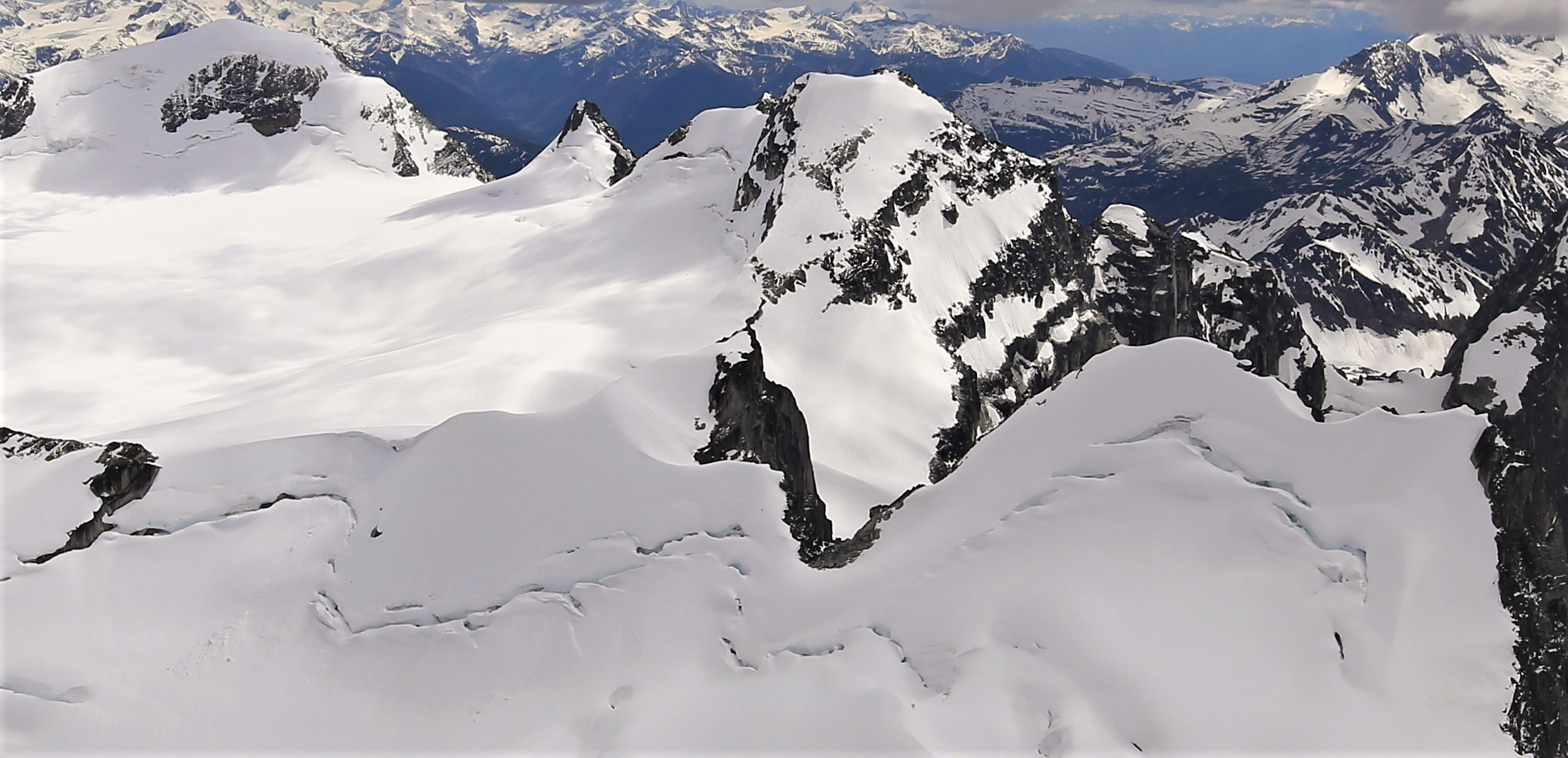
Flattop Peak (center), Howser Peak (upper left), with little Thimble Peak between the two

== See also ==
- The Bugaboos
- Geography of British Columbia
