= Magaziner =

Magaziner is a surname which may refer to:

== Surname ==
- Alfred Magaziner (1902–1993), Austrian journalist
- Ira Magaziner (born 1947), American advisor
- Louis Magaziner (1878–1956), American architect
- Seth Magaziner (born 1983), American politician
