= The Four Squatters =

Mountain in British Columbia, Canada

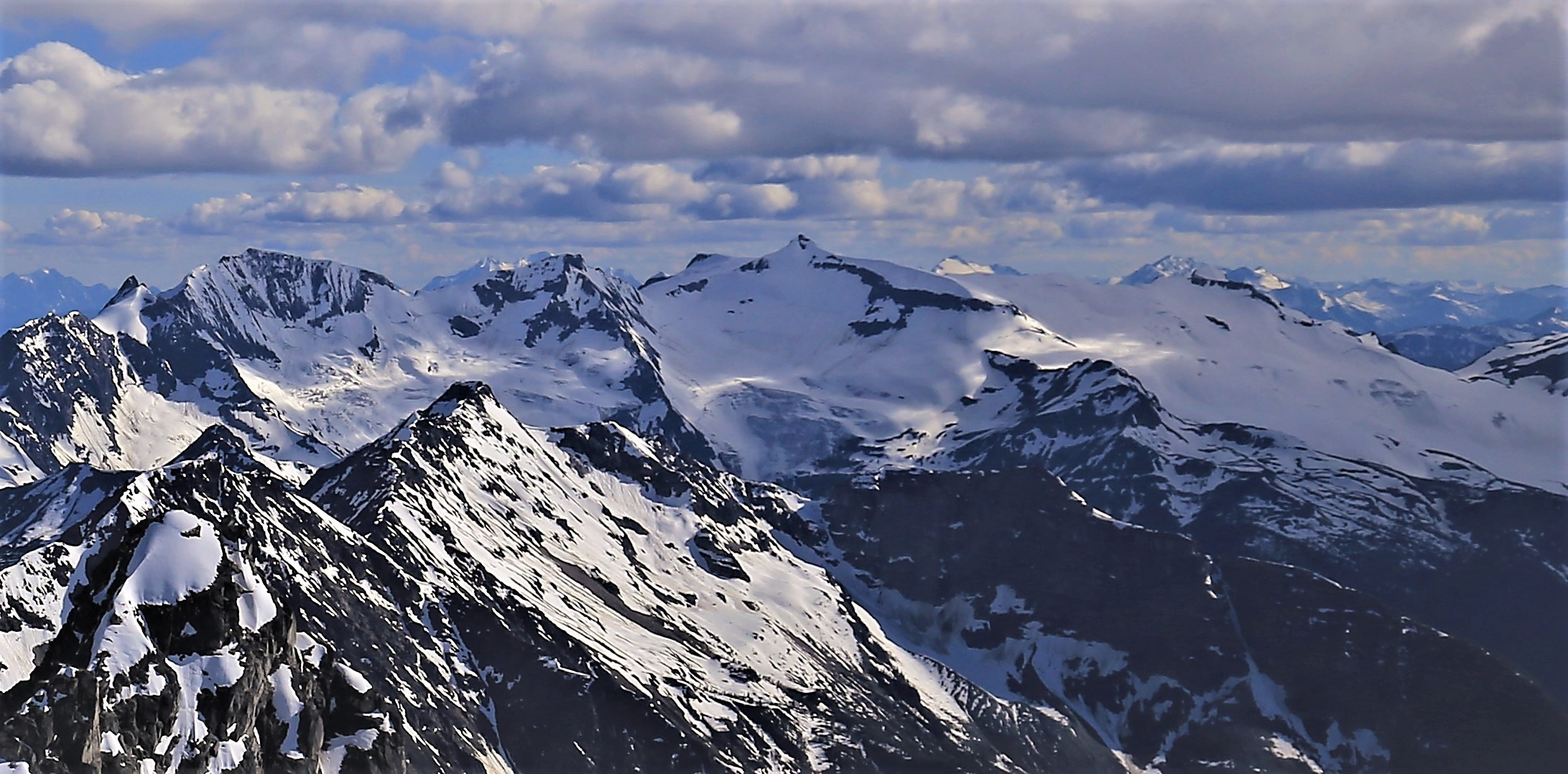
- North aspect, viewed from The Bugaboos

Highest point
- Elevation: 3,072 m (10,079 ft)
- Prominence: 673 m (2,208 ft)
- Parent peak: Howser Peak (3,094 m)
- Isolation: 13.94 km (8.66 mi)
- Listing: Mountains of British Columbia
- Coordinates: 50°36′19″N 116°54′12″W

Geography
- Location within British Columbia Location within Canada
- Interactive map of The Four Squatters
- Country: Canada
- Province: British Columbia
- District: Kootenay Land District
- Parent range: Purcell Mountains; Columbia Mountains
- Topo map: NTS 82K10 Howser Creek

The Four Squatters is a 3,072-metre (10,079-foot) mountain in British Columbia, Canada.

== Description ==
The Four Squatters is located in the Purcell Mountains, southwest of Bugaboo Provincial Park, and southeast of the confluence of East Creek and Duncan River. Precipitation runoff from The Four Squatters drains into East and Howser creeks, which are both tributaries of the Duncan River. The Four Squatters is more notable for its steep rise above local terrain than for its absolute elevation as topographic relief is significant with the summit rising nearly 2,500 metres (8,200 ft) above Duncan Lake in 8 km (5.0 mi). The nearest higher neighbor is line parent Howser Peak, 13 km (8.1 mi) to the northeast.

== History ==
The landform's name was applied in 1910 by Canadian surveyor Arthur Oliver Wheeler, and the mountain's toponym was officially adopted on June 9, 1960, by the Geographical Names Board of Canada. In the 1970s, guidebook author Robert Kruszyna applied unofficial names to the four separate highpoints: Aloof (3,069 m), Humble (3,002 m), Reposing (3,002 m), and Crouching (2,972 m).

== Climate ==
Based on the Köppen climate classification, Four Squatters is located in a subarctic climate zone with cold, snowy winters, and mild summers. Winter temperatures can drop below −20 °C with wind chill factors below −30 °C. This climate supports an unnamed icefield surrounding the slopes of this remote massif.

== See also ==
- The Bugaboos
- Geography of British Columbia
