= Georgia Engelhard =

Georgia E. Engelhard Cromwell (November 19, 1906 – September 14, 1986) was an American mountaineer in the Canadian Rockies and the Selkirk and Purcell ranges. She was the first female climber to ascend many of the peaks in the Rockies and was the leading female amateur climber of her day. She was also an accomplished painter and photographer.

== Early life ==
Engelhard was born in Manhattan on November 19, 1906, the first child of George Engelhard, a lawyer, and Agnes Stieglitz. She was a niece of Alfred Stieglitz, an American photographer and modern art promoter, and his wife, Georgia O'Keeffe, an American artist considered by many to be the "Mother of American modernism". To avoid confusion of names between the two "Georgias", Engelhard was usually referred to as "The Kid" or "Georgia Minor". She occasionally posed for photographs by Stieglitz, including nudes. Stieglitz was a close confidant and mentor to Engelhard, and the two corresponded vigorously from the time she was twelve into her early twenties.

Engelhard took up art at an early age and showed considerable talent. Stieglitz sponsored a month-long exhibition of her water colors and drawings at his famous gallery, 291, in 1916, when she was just 10 years old.

Engelhard studied art at Vassar College, graduating with an A.B. in 1927. Later in life, she abandoned painting and turned to photography.

In her early 20s, she won prizes for her equestrian skills at the National Horse Show in New York.

== Mountain climbing ==
Engelhard had visited the European Alps in her teens. In 1926, she climbed in the Mount Rainier area with her father. That same year, her family visited the Canadian Rockies, where she climbed Pinnacle Mountain with Edward Feuz, Jr. assisting as her guide. She returned to the Rockies for 15 summers during the next 25 years.

In 1929, Engelhard climbed nine peaks in the Canadian Rockies: Mount Lefroy, the traverse of the two Pope's Peaks, the traverse of Haddo Peak and Mount Aberdeen, Mount Hungabee, Mount Huber, Mount Victoria, and Mount Biddle.

In 1931, she climbed a total of 38 peaks in the Canadian Rockies, Selkirks, and Purcells. She reached the summit of Mount Victoria eight times that summer, with seven of the trips made as a part of the filming of the movie She Climbs to Conquer (1932), which was directed by William J. Oliver, the famed Calgary-based film maker. The film was sponsored by Parks Canada, the parks branch of the Canadian national government, and was instrumental in drawing increased tourism to the Canadian Rockies. Engelhard appears in the film as an unnamed female climbing along with her guide Edward Feuz.

Engelhard completed 32 first ascents in the Rockies and Selkirks.

She climbed several of the US Rocky Mountains in Colorado and most of the Cascade Volcanoes.

In 1935 she climbed the European Alps for the first time, joining Oliver Eaton (Tony) Cromwell, Jr., who became a member of the 1939 failed German-American expedition up the Pakistani peak of K2. Cromwell was a veteran mountaineer and he and Engelhard married in 1947 after the two had climbed together for several years, mostly in the Canadian Rockies. The marriage was Cromwell's third and Engelhard's first. The couple later moved to Switzerland. Engelhard never returned to the Canadian Rockies after 1946.

Engelhard considered the best compliment of her climbing skill to be that offered by her guide Feuz after she and Cromwell had climbed Victoria, Collier, and Pope's Peak Traverse. Feuz said in his heavy Swiss accent: "Dat Chorcha, she vants to do too much." He added that Engelhard "climbed so fast she often had us guides puffing to keep up."

Engelhard was one of the first women to wear pants as opposed to the customary ankle-length skirt when climbing, as was dictated by Victorian female fashion conventions of the early 20th century.

== Painting and photography ==
Her aunt Georgia O'Keeffe mentored Engelhard as a painter. The two artists frequently painted together at O'Keeffe and Stieglitz's summer house on Lake George and occasionally took excursions together, sometimes walking without clothes for miles through the dense forests.

Engelhard's paintings reflected O'Keeffe's influence. Their two styles, in fact, became so similar that late in life O'Keeffe received a letter from an art collector, enclosing a photo of a painting, asking if the particular painting had, in fact, been painted by O'Keeffe. O'Keeffe was not sure and wrote to Engelhard in Switzerland enclosing the photograph of the painting. Engelhard replied that it was she, in fact, who had done the painting.

In 1938, when Engelhard began living with Cromwell, she stopped painting and together the couple pursued photography. Their photographs were mainly ordinary scenes of the Swiss Alps and alpine villages. Many of the photographs were sold to postcard companies or used in promotional tourism advertising.

== Later life ==
Engelhard died on September 14, 1986, two months before she turned 80, in Interlaken, Switzerland, where she and her husband had lived for 30 years. She was buried in Green-Wood Cemetery in Brooklyn.

== Peaks named after Engelhard ==
- Mount Engelhard
- Engelhard Tower

Mount Cromwell and Cromwell Tower are named after Engelhard's husband, Tony Cromwell.

== Additional sources ==
- Smith, Cyndi. Off the Beaten Track: Women Adventurers and Mountaineers in Western Canada. Coyote Books, 1989. ISBN 9780969245728.
