= Uptown Theater (Philadelphia) =

- Uptown Theater and Office Building
- U.S. National Register of Historic Places
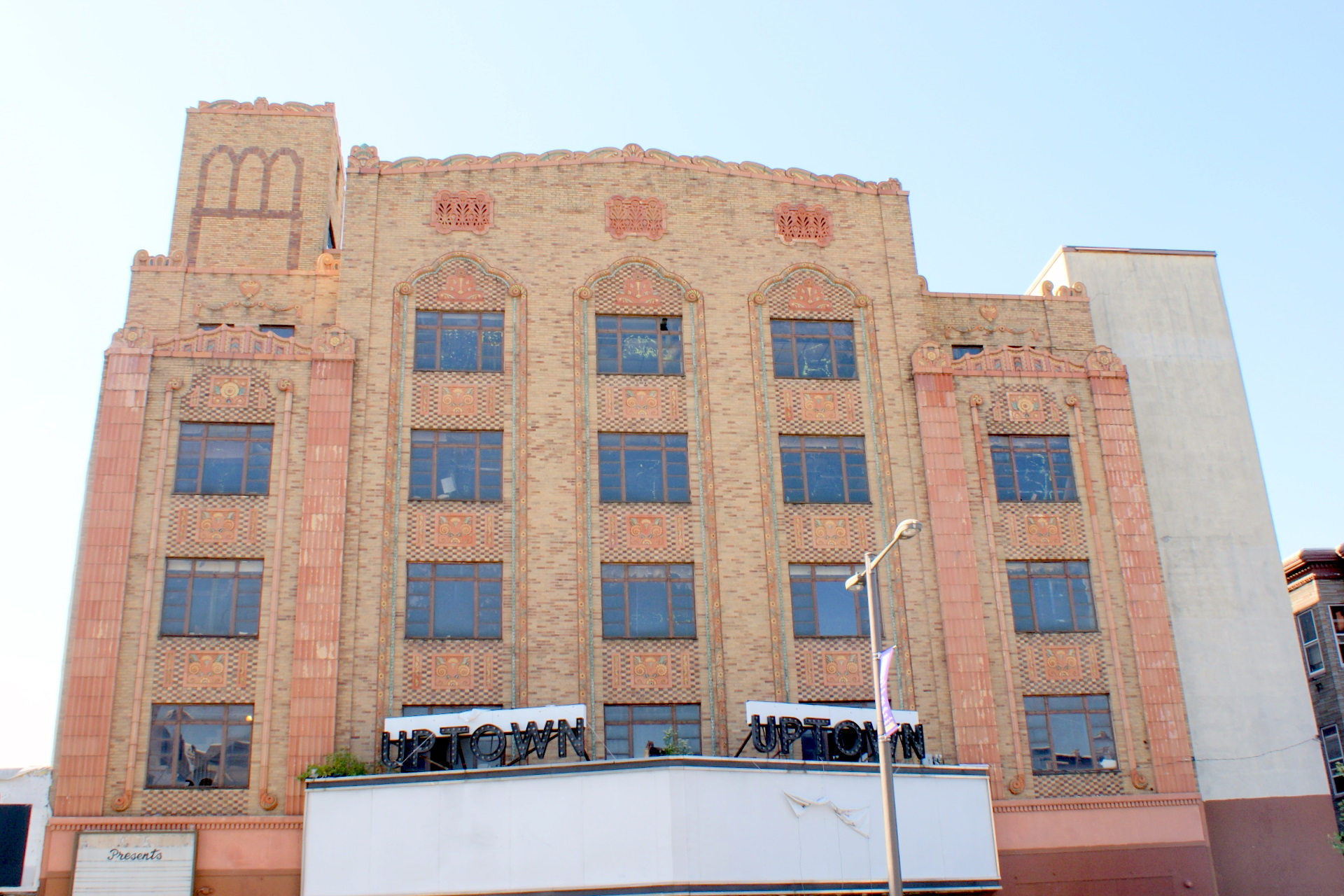

- Location within Philadelphia Location within Pennsylvania Location within the United States
- Location: 2240–2248 N. Broad Street, Philadelphia, Pennsylvania
- Coordinates: 39°59′14″N 75°9′23″W
- Built: 1927
- Architect: Magaziner, Eberhard & Harris
- Architectural style: Art Deco
- NRHP reference No.: 82003817
- Added to NRHP: July 22, 1982

The Uptown Theater is an Art Deco building situated in Philadelphia, Pennsylvania. It was constructed in 1927 and was designed by the Philadelphia-based architectural firm Magaziner, Eberhard & Harris. The theatre is located on 2240 N. Broad Street. It became a major venue on the Chitlin' Circuit from 1951 to 1978. In 1982, it was listed on the National Register of Historic Places.

In the 1980s, the theater was repurposed as a church, but was later abandoned in 1991 following extensive weather damage. In 2006, the Uptown Entertainment and Development Corporation bought the building with plans for renovation.

== History ==
The Uptown Theater, located in Philadelphia, began operation on February 16, 1929. Designed to accommodate the emerging "talkies" produced by Warner Brothers, the venue featured 2,040 seats and spanned 50,000 square feet. Architect Louis Magaziner crafted the building with a richly decorated interior and included four floors of office space above the auditorium. The design incorporated stained glass, high ceilings, and terracotta detailing. During this period, as the industrial age reached its height in the United States, a wave of European immigrants settled in North Philadelphia, moving into newly constructed row houses in the area.

In addition to the new immigrants, North Philadelphia also became the home to many fashionable mansions of the upper and upper-middle class. Executives from nearby factories lived in Victorian brownstones, some with turrets and mansard roofs, which lined the streets of North Philadelphia. Along Broad Street were the grand mansions of many industrialists. Lower North Philadelphia in particular housed a number of the nouveau riche; ambitious first or second generation immigrants or that had made their fortunes starting manufacturing firms.

The theater was originally built to appeal to the upper middle class residents of the surrounding area, but the Great Depression and subsequent economic downturn took a harsh toll on the people of North Philadelphia. While the city had originally had a predominantly white population, discriminatory practices such as redlining and racially biased lending from loan companies led to a large increase in the urban black population, as well as a subsequent outflow of white residents. Black doctors, lawyers, politicians, and preachers took over the grand mansions along Diamond Street, while middle and lower class black residents moved into the rowhouses that were once predominately white.

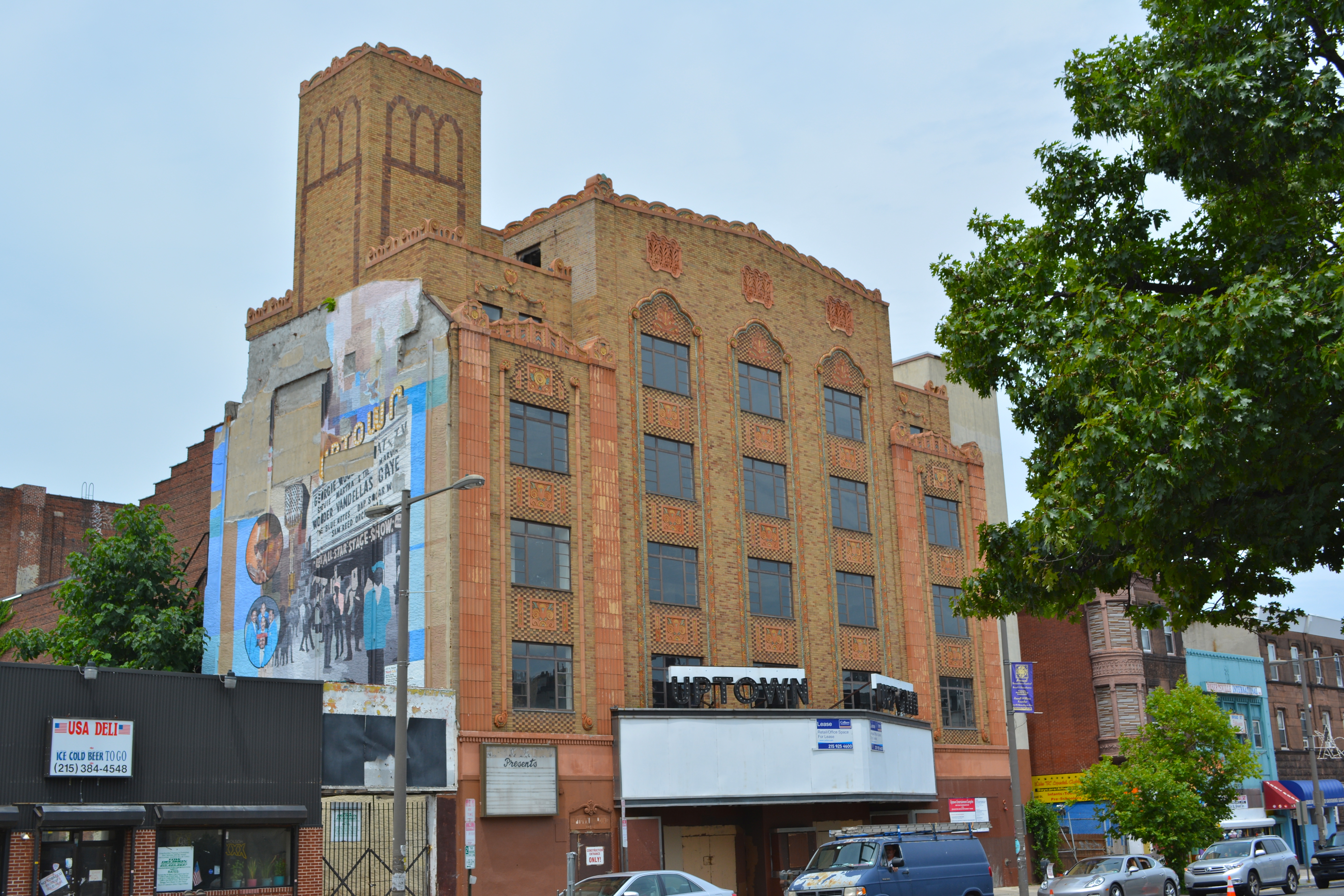
The theater in 2014

In 1951, the Uptown Theatre was bought by Sam Stiefel, who also owned Washington's Howard Theatre and Baltimore's Royal Theatre. The theatre became part of the "chitlin circuit," hosting live music shows that were primarily rhythm and blues, soul, and gospel directed towards an African American audience. The performances at the Uptown Theater came to rival those at Harlem's Apollo Theater. In 1957, Georgie Woods of WDAS (AM) fame started to produce shows at the Uptown Theater. In 1960, Sid Booker became the manager of the theater and remained so until 1979. In 1961, the venue was sold by Bert Stiefel to a large chain corporation, after managing it for only two months following the death of the Stiefel brothers.

=== Performances ===
Many different types of shows went on at the venue during its prime. Each show consisted of multiple artists, usually ten to twelve acts, and they performed in order of popularity. There were several performances a day, and the show usually lasted for about ten days. The first show of the day started at 2pm. The midnight performances of the show cost $2.50, while the earlier shows cost $1.50, and the kiddie matinees cost 50 cents a person. In its early years, patrons could arrive on the Broad Street Subway and enter through the theatre's own subway platform.

On Thursday nights, the theater used to have "Temple University Night", in which many white students at Temple University would come in and watch performances. Many patrons of the theater would hide in places such as the bathroom to see additional shows in one day. The shows themselves were very competitive in nature, with each act trying to get the biggest rise out of the crowd. Performers and audience members alike dressed up when attending shows at the theater. Artists were often paid little. Georgie Woods was able to book the Supremes for $400 for a full 10-day run.

Comedians such as Redd Foxx and Flip Wilson used to open for the acts, and the venue had its own house band. Bill Masse was leader of the band until he died in 1961. In 1963, Sam Reed became leader of the house band, which was well known amongst artists in the chitlin circuit. According to The Philadelphia Inquirer, by 1971 the shows were grossing $250,000 a year. During the rest of the month when performers were not in town, movies usually played. There were also jazz shows where local and famous jazz performers took the stage. The shows were not characterized by the rowdy crowds that accompanied the shows promoted by Georgie Woods.

The Uptown Theater was also famous for its amateur nights in which local artists would compete for various prizes. Many artists got their start in the music industry due to these amateur nights. One such person that started their career at the Uptown Theater was Daryl Hall of Hall & Oates. Hall, who attended the nearby Temple University, won a talent show playing with his then group, The Temptones. The group, backed by the James Brown Band, won the contest, thus getting Hall his first record deal.

=== Civil rights ===
The theater was a hotbed for civil rights activism, especially in the form of music. Georgie Woods produced shows at the theater, called freedom shows, in which artists played to promote civil rights. The money generated at these shows went to charities of Georgie Woods' choice, regardless of creed, color or religion. In 1967, Georgie Woods staged a special show for wounded veterans from the Vietnam War that were from the Philadelphia area. The theater also became an important landmark for civil rights in Philadelphia. Cecil Moore was a Philadelphia lawyer that was extremely involved in civil rights, was a close friend of Georgie Woods, and was also involved in the freedom shows.

In 1963, Georgie Woods, Jackie Wilson, and Del Shields won awards at the Uptown Theater from the Philadelphia branch of the NAACP for being entertainers that were actively involved in civil rights. The 1964 Philadelphia race riot happened blocks from the theater, and Commissioner Howard R. Leary had Georgie Woods come talk to and calm down the crowd, which eventually dispersed as per his request.

=== Later years and decline ===
Eventually, the riots and the manufacturing exodus of the 1960s occurred, as well as the gang wars of the 1970s. By 1978, the Uptown was too small for the major acts, in an area with high crime. In 1971, Sam Reed, who was leader of the house band in the 1960s, stepped down. In December 1971, there were frequent concert gang fights that broke out. In 1972, Georgie Woods stopped producing shows at the Uptown Theater, mainly because of the drugs and violence in the surrounding neighborhood. In May 1972, shows stopped playing at all at the venue, and in 1978 the Uptown Theater ultimately closed.

Other reasons led to the decline of theaters similar to the venue. The music industry had changed significantly from when the theater was in its prime. Black artists were now able to cross over and play in venues such as ones in Atlantic City and Las Vegas. Musicians that played there were able to perform at larger venues and make more profit. Georgie Woods also stated in an interview that the existence of booking agencies made it harder to book acts because they would ask for more money.

There was a point in time when black artists could only be heard if they went to Georgie Woods, but it became less necessary once music became integrated. The decline of independent record stores also disabled local artists from being able to promote their music. With music becoming more integrated, many radio stations only played a sampling of rhythm and blues when they used to solely play rhythm and blues. Many artists started to cross over into pop, so they were less inclined to play at theaters such as the Uptown.

The neighborhood also changed dramatically. Many of the businesses started to decline because they catered to the Uptown clientele and lost them once the theater closed.

The Uptown briefly reopened in the 1980s as a church. A church group held services there until a 1991 storm damaged the roof, allowing water to pucker the painted walls and corrode the gilded auditorium. After the congregation left, the only people who entered were "thieves, crackheads and taggers." Later, members of the community gathered at the Uptown to mourn the death of Michael Jackson.

The Uptown Entertainment and Development Corporation (UEDC), a Community Development Corporation that was incorporated as a nonprofit in 1995, acquired the theater building in 2006. Fund raising and renovation work were ongoing in 2018 and a 2020 re-opening was anticipated. However, the work stalled due to COVID-19 shutdowns and an attrition of board leadership. In February 2022 the UEDC had new leadership and was restarting the renovation work. The group declined to anticipate a new opening date after having missed that goal in the past.
