= Stotesbury =

Stotesbury may refer to:

== Places ==
- Stotesbury, Missouri, U.S.
- Stotesbury, West Virginia, U.S.

== People ==
- Edward T. Stotesbury (1849–1938), American investment banker
- Louis W. Stotesbury (1870–1948), American attorney and military officer
