= Wyndmoor, Pennsylvania =

Unincorporated community in Pennsylvania, US

Wyndmoor
- Census-designated place
- Location of Wyndmoor in Pennsylvania Wyndmoor (the United States)
- Coordinates: 40°04′58″N 75°11′31″W
- Country: United States
- State: Pennsylvania
- County: Montgomery
- Township: Springfield

Area
  - Total: 1.64 sq mi (4.26 km^{2})
  - Land: 1.64 sq mi (4.26 km^{2})
  - Water: 0 sq mi (0.00 km^{2})
- Elevation: 420 ft (130 m)

Population (2020)
  - Total: 5,853
  - Density: 3,557.2/sq mi (1,373.45/km^{2})
- Time zone: UTC-5 (EST)
  - Summer (DST): UTC-4 (EDT)
- Area codes: 215, 267, and 445
- FIPS code: 42-86776

Wyndmoor is a census-designated place (CDP) in Springfield Township, Montgomery County, Pennsylvania, United States. The population was 5,853 at the 2020 census. Wyndmoor has the same ZIP code, 19038, as the towns of Glenside, North Hills, and Erdenheim.

== Geography ==
Wyndmoor is located at 40°4′58″N 75°11′31″W (40.082810, −75.191829), which is just outside the northern boundary of Philadelphia.

According to the United States Census Bureau, the CDP has a total area of 1.6 square miles (4.1 km^{2}), all land.

== Demographics ==
Historical population
Census	Pop.	Note	%±
1990	5,682		—
2000	5,601		−1.4%
2010	5,498		−1.8%
2020	5,853		6.5%
U.S. Decennial Census

As of the 2020 Census, there were 5,853 people, 2,255 households, and 2,065 families residing in the CDP. The CDP was 74.7% Non-Hispanic White, 16.8% Black or African American, 0.2% Native American and Alaskan Native, 3.1% Asian, 1.6% Hispanic or Latino, and 4.7% two or more races. The median income for a household in the CDP was $142,583.

== Transportation ==
Wyndmoor is served by two SEPTA stations. The first is the Wyndmoor station which is on the Chestnut Hill East line. The station is located in the nearby Chestnut Hill neighborhood of Philadelphia. Residents can also use the Oreland station on the Lansdale/Doylestown line which is located in the Oreland section of Springfield Township. Bus routes serving Wyndmoor include the 51 and 77 routes.

== History ==
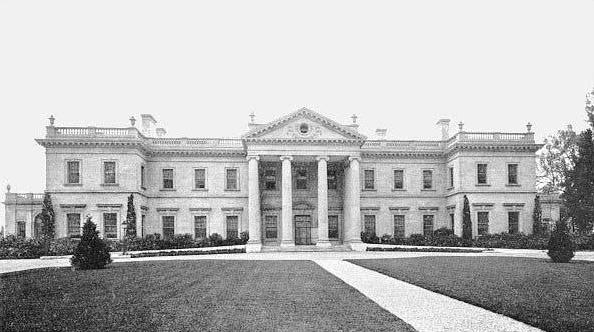
Whitemarsh Hall (Edward T. Stotesbury mansion), (built 1916–21, demolished 1980)

William Penn, the founder of Pennsylvania, reserved Springfield Township as one of his family's original manors in the 1680s.

The origin of the name "Wyndmoor" is somewhat obscure. The community was earlier called "Bungtown," "Spring (or Springfield) Village," and "Tedyuscung," after the Native American leader, Teedyuscung, whose statue stands overlooking the Wissahickon Creek in Valley Green. "Wyndmoor" is variously said to be an appellation offered by the Heebner family who donated land for the Reading Railroad station, or originally the name of the estate of Randal Morgan, who made a fortune in oil and purchased property adjacent to the Reading Railroad station about 1900. The name eventually replaced the name "Springfield Village" for the small collection of shops and houses just east of Stenton Avenue, and finally encompassed the entire residential area east of Stenton Avenue.

Wyndmoor was the site of Whitemarsh Hall, the 300-acre (1.2 km^{2}) estate of banking executive Edward T. Stotesbury. The estate became a housing development in the late 1940s, and the 147-room mansion was demolished in 1980, but the columns of its portico and pieces of statuary survive in the neighborhoods of Wyndmoor.

The Stotesbury Club House and John Welsh House are listed on the National Register of Historic Places.

== Wyndmoor Hose Company ==
=== 20th century ===
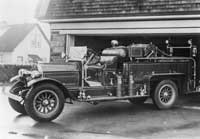
Wyndmoor Hose Company No 1

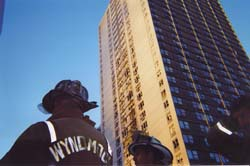
Wyndmoor volunteers assist at ground zero following the September 11 attacks

Wyndmoor Hose Company No. 1 was formed in 1906 and chartered in 1907. The seeds of the local fire company grew out of an industrial base at Mermaid Lane and Queen Street. There, the Nelson Valve Company began an in-house fire brigade to meet the needs of the dangerous industrial mechanisms used to make hydraulic valves. Eventually, the local community was solicited for its help in keeping this fire unit viable and expanding its services to the larger community. Residents volunteered, recognizing the communal benefit, and with help from the valve company a two-wheeled hand cart was purchased and 500 feet of hose. By 1909, the shed used at the valve Company was expanded, as were the hose carts to four wheels and two horses. Horse power proved a problem. A monetary reward was granted to the first horse team to arrive at the sound of the alarm and haul the apparatus to the scene. This actually produced a rivalry among horse teams!

At the dawn of the Roaring Twenties the fire company got a new home, on Queen Street closer to Willow Grove Ave. It still stands and served as a firehouse for nearly 50 years. In 1927, Wyndmoor purchased two Hale Pumpers and in 1940 a city service ladder truck. As the nations infant automotive industry diversified and began to specialize, communities began purchasing recognizable fire apparatus. A huge property along Willow Grove Ave. was purchased by the fire company, and large fairs were held for a dozen years. The proceeds from these carnivals offset astronomical costs and allowed the continued modernization of the fire service in Wyndmoor.

Wyndmoor Hose Company is a 100% volunteer department. The fifty-plus members who make up the working force are notified by digital paging systems, day and night, 24 hours a day, 7 days a week, 365-days-a-year.

In the late 1990s, it was decided that the fire company would add emergency medical services to its already expanded list of rescue operations. The company purchased the QRS (Quick Response Service) unit that houses enough basic life support and first-aid equipment to complement the Springfield Ambulance Association's arrival.

=== 21st century ===
Shortly after WHCo sent a crew to Ground Zero following September 11, 2001's terrorist activities, the Hazardous Materials operation also expanded. Wyndmoor teamed with HazMat 919 as Eastern Montgomery County's primary decontamination service. A larger environmental response trailer was purchased to accommodate the increased quantity of equipment needed. A much more in-depth training program was enforced and all WHCo members were required to complete advanced levels of hazardous materials training.

Wyndmoor Hose Company, No. 1 responds with a 2007 Pierce Rescue, a Ford F550, has a boat used for rescue, and trailers. A '19 Rosenbauer with a 55' aerial boom was received in May 2019 - Snorkel 82.

== Education ==
The school district is Springfield Township School District.

Other institutions:

- La Salle College High School
- The Institutes for the Achievement of Human Potential (IAHP)

== Notable people ==
Notable current and former residents of Wyndmoor include:

- Samuel L. M. Barlow (1892–1982), was a Harvard-educated composer, pianist and art critic.
- Ray Benson (March 16, 1951 - ), country music star, cofounder of Asleep at the Wheel.
- Frank Cassidy (June 28, 1989 - ), former U.S. Federal Housing Commissioner and Assistant Secretary for Housing.
- Jim Cramer (February 10, 1955-), CNBC host of Mad Money
- Steven Kampmann (born 1947), actor, writer, and director.
- Robert L. McNeil, Jr. (1915–2010), developer of Tylenol and chairman of McNeil Laboratories
- David Montgomery (1946-2019), was the part-owner, general partner, president, and chief executive officer of the Philadelphia Phillies.
- Otto Frederick Nolde (1899–1972), was a human rights pioneer
- Lucky Oceans (April 21, 1951 - ), pedal steel guitarist and cofounder of Asleep at the Wheel, later a broadcaster with the Australian Broadcasting Corporation.
- Edward T. Stotesbury (February 26, 1849 – May 16, 1938), was an investment banker, a partner in Drexel & Co. and its New York affiliate J. P. Morgan & Co. for over 55 years.
