= John Welsh House =

Historic house in Pennsylvania, United States

- U.S. National Register of Historic Places
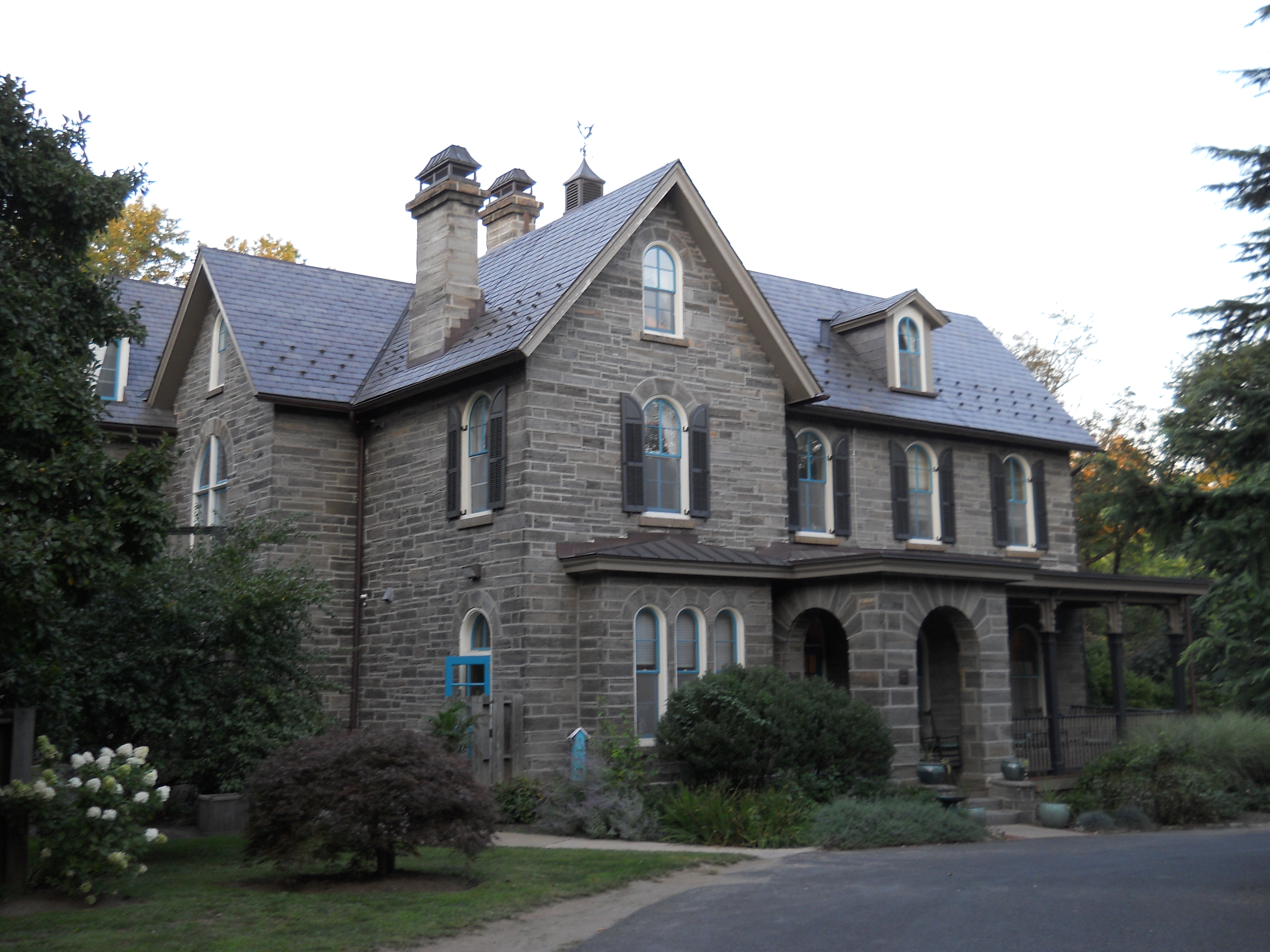

- Location within Pennsylvania Location within the United States
- Location: 8765 Stenton Ave., Wyndmoor, Pennsylvania
- Coordinates: 40°5′2″N 75°12′19″W
- Area: 2 acres (0.81 ha)
- Built: 1867, 1892
- Architect: Hickman, Louis C.
- Architectural style: Gothic, Italianate
- NRHP reference No.: 90001415
- Added to NRHP: September 5, 1990

The John Welsh House, also known as "Rauhala," is an historic home in Wyndmoor in Springfield Township, Montgomery County, Pennsylvania, United States.

It was added to the National Register of Historic Places in 1990.

== History and architectural features ==
Built in 1867, this historic structure was expanded in 1892. It consists of an asymmetrical Gothic Revival cottage in front of a cubic Italianate-style cottage.

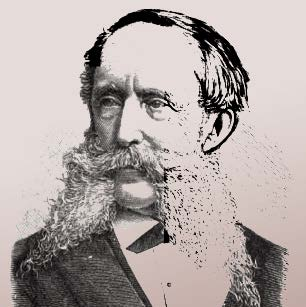

The house is made from cut and squared Wissahickon schist, and is located on Stenton Avenue, which borders Wyndmoor and the Chestnut Hill area of Philadelphia.

The original property was owned by Hannah Callowhill Penn. She was the second wife of William Penn, the first colonial proprietor of the Province of Pennsylvania. After her husband suffered a series of strokes in 1712, she became acting Proprietor of Pennsylvania. While in this role, the Crown put great pressure on her to surrender the colony for a cash settlement that would relieve the Penn family of debt. Hannah Penn, through careful planning and difficult decisions, was able to prevent the surrender of the colony to the Crown. Due to her financial management, the proprietary colony remained in the hands of Hannah's branch of the Penn family until the Revolution. Penn later became the first woman awarded the status of Honorary Citizen of United States. This honor, which was conferred to her by President Ronald Reagan through a Presidential Proclamation in 1984, cited her “devotion to the pursuit of peace and justice."

Major General Washburn purchased the home and property as a wedding gift for his daughter Jeannette Garr Washburn and her husband Albert Warren Kelsey. Though Major General Washburn never resided on the property, his leadership and service to his country left a lasting impact on his daughter and descendants.

During the Civil War, Washburn organized the Wisconsin Volunteer Cavalry for the Union Army and earned his rank as major general. Washburn came from a family of political and business leaders. He served as the governor of Wisconsin for one term, U.S. Congressmen for ten years, and was one of the seven famous Washburn brothers; three of whom served their country in roles of governor, congressional representative and U.S. Secretary of State. After moving into the John Welsh House in 1886, newlyweds Albert & Jeanette Kelsey renamed the home “Rauhala” (Finnish for “peaceful place”).

== Later years ==
This house was added to the National Register of Historic Places in 1990.

On September 27, 1997, Keystone House opened its doors as the first freestanding residential hospice in southeastern Pennsylvania at the John Welsh House. Today, Keystone House is owned and operated by KeystoneCare, a nonprofit home health and hospice care provider.
