= 1940 United States Senate election in New Jersey =

- November 5, 1940
- Turnout: 86% (▲12pp)
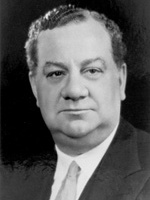

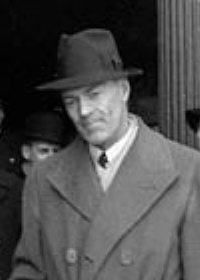
Nominee	William Warren Barbour	James H. R. Cromwell
Party	Republican	Democratic
Popular vote	1,029,331	823,893
Percentage	55.11%	44.11%
- County results Barbour: 50–60% 60–70% Cromwell: 50–60%
Senator before election
W. Warren Barbour
Republican
Elected Senator
W. Warren Barbour
Republican

The United States Senate election of 1940 in New Jersey was held on November 5, 1940.

Incumbent Republican Senator William Warren Barbour was re-elected over Democrat James H. R. Cromwell, who had recently been appointed United States Ambassador to Canada.

== Republican primary ==
=== Candidates ===
- William Warren Barbour, incumbent Senator since 1938 (Note: Barbour also previously served a full term in the Senate from 1931 to 1937.)
- C. Dan Coskey, candidate for Senate in 1936 and 1938
- George O. Pullen, candidate for Senate in 1938

=== Results ===
1940 Republican Senate special primary
Party	Candidate	Votes	%
Republican	William Warren Barbour (incumbent)	390,155	86.17%
Republican	George O. Pullen	32,633	7.21%
Republican	C. Dan Coskey	29,991	6.62%
Total votes		452,779	100.00%

== Democratic primary ==
=== Candidates ===
- James H. R. Cromwell, United States Ambassador to Canada

=== Results ===
1940 Democratic U.S. Senate special primary
Party	Candidate	Votes	%
Democratic	James H. R. Cromwell	243,608	100.0%
Total votes		243,608	100.0%

== General election ==
=== Candidates ===
- William Warren Barbour (Republican), incumbent Senator
- George Breitman (Socialist Workers), activist and editor of The Militant
- McAlister Coleman (Socialist), journalist and author
- James H. R. Cromwell (Democrat), United States Ambassador to Canada
- Mary E. Dooner (Communist)
- Edson R. Leach (Prohibition)
- Harry Santhouse (Socialist Labor)
- James A. Tumulty (Constitutional)

=== Results ===
1940 United States Senate election in New Jersey
Party	Candidate	Votes	%
Republican	W. Warren Barbour (incumbent)	1,029,331	55.11%
Democratic	James H. R. Cromwell	823,893	44.11%
Socialist	McAlister Coleman	8,836	0.47%
Independent	James A. Tumulty Jr.	2,784	0.15%
Communist	Mary Ellen Dooner	1,519	0.08%
Prohibition	Edson R. Leach	645	0.03%
Socialist Labor	Harry Santhouse	464	0.02%
Socialist Workers	George Breitman	303	0.02%
Majority		225,438	11.00%
Turnout		1,867,775	
Republican hold			

== See also ==
- 1940 United States Senate elections
