= Wingwood House =

Former neo-colonial house in Maine, US

Coordinates: 44.39857927°N 68.2266947°W

The house, circa 1940

Wingwood House was a neo-colonial house in Bar Harbor, Maine.

An existing house was expanded in 1927 for Edward T. Stotesbury as a summer "cottage", and was designed by architects Magaziner, Eberhard & Harris. The resulting 80-room mansion had a 30-room servants’ wing and was heated by 56 electric wall heaters, five hot air furnaces, and 26 hand-carved marble fireplaces imported from Europe. The house had 28 bathrooms and 52 telephones with 23 extensions. Stotesbury's wife, Eva Roberts Cromwell Stotesbury, was an active member of society in Bar Harbor. The home was demolished in 1953 to make way for the Canadian National Bluenose ferry terminal. It is now the location of the Marine Atlantic Terminal.
