= Louise Cromwell Brooks =

American socialite (1890–1965)

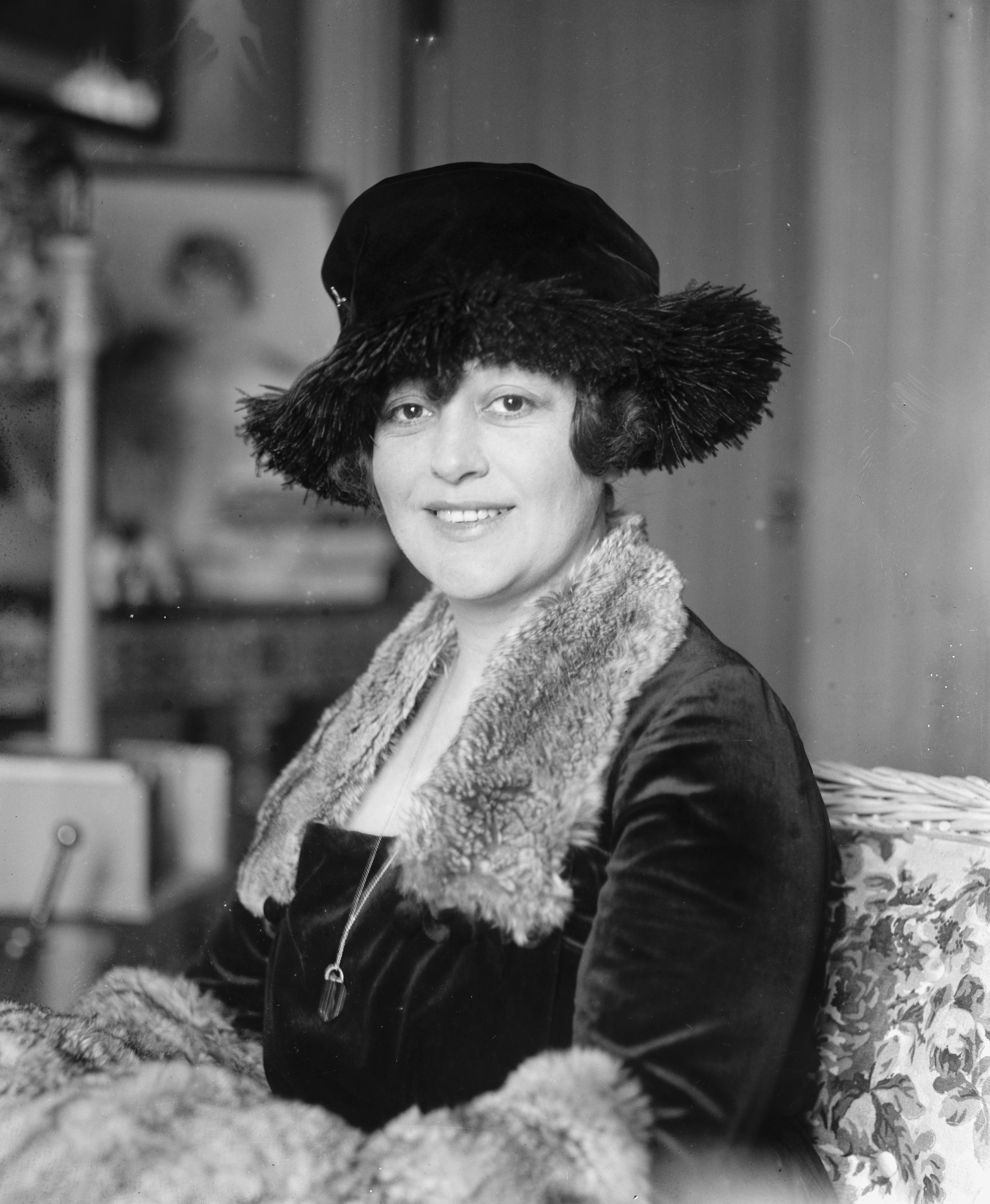
- Brooks in 1921
- Born: Henrietta Louise Cromwell; September 24, 1890; Rye, New York, US
- Died: May 30, 1965 (aged 74); Washington, DC, US
- Spouses: Walter Brooks Jr. (m. 1911; div. 1919) Douglas MacArthur (m. 1922; div. 1929) Lionel Atwill (m. 1930; div. 1943) Alf Heiberg (m. 1944, divorced)
- Children: 3
- Relatives: Oliver Eaton Cromwell Jr. (brother); James H. R. Cromwell (brother)

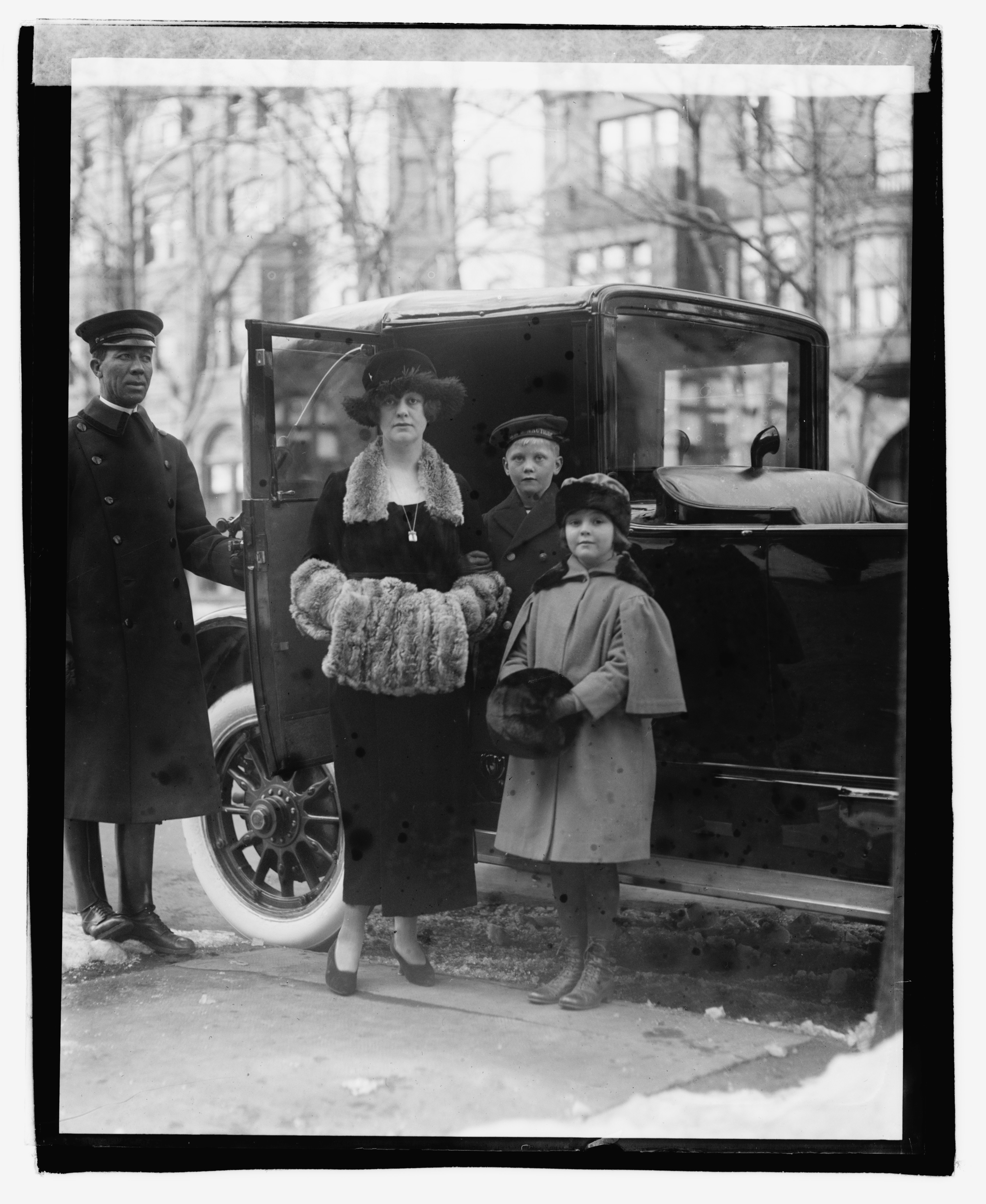
Mrs W.B. Brooks Jr. and her children February 25, 1921

Louise Cromwell (born Henrietta Louise Cromwell; September 24, 1890 – May 30, 1965) was an American socialite whose four marriages included seven years as the first wife of General of the Army Douglas MacArthur. She was "considered one of Washington's most beautiful and attractive young women".

== Biography ==
She was born as Henrietta Louise Cromwell on September 24, 1890, in Rye, New York to Lucretia Bishop "Eva" Roberts and Oliver Eaton Cromwell (1846-1909). Her brothers were the American mountain climber Oliver Eaton Cromwell Jr., and James H. R. Cromwell, the American diplomat and first husband of Doris Duke. After her father's death her mother married prominent investment banker Edward T. Stotesbury in 1912.

She made her debut in Washington, DC in 1910. Cromwell married four times.

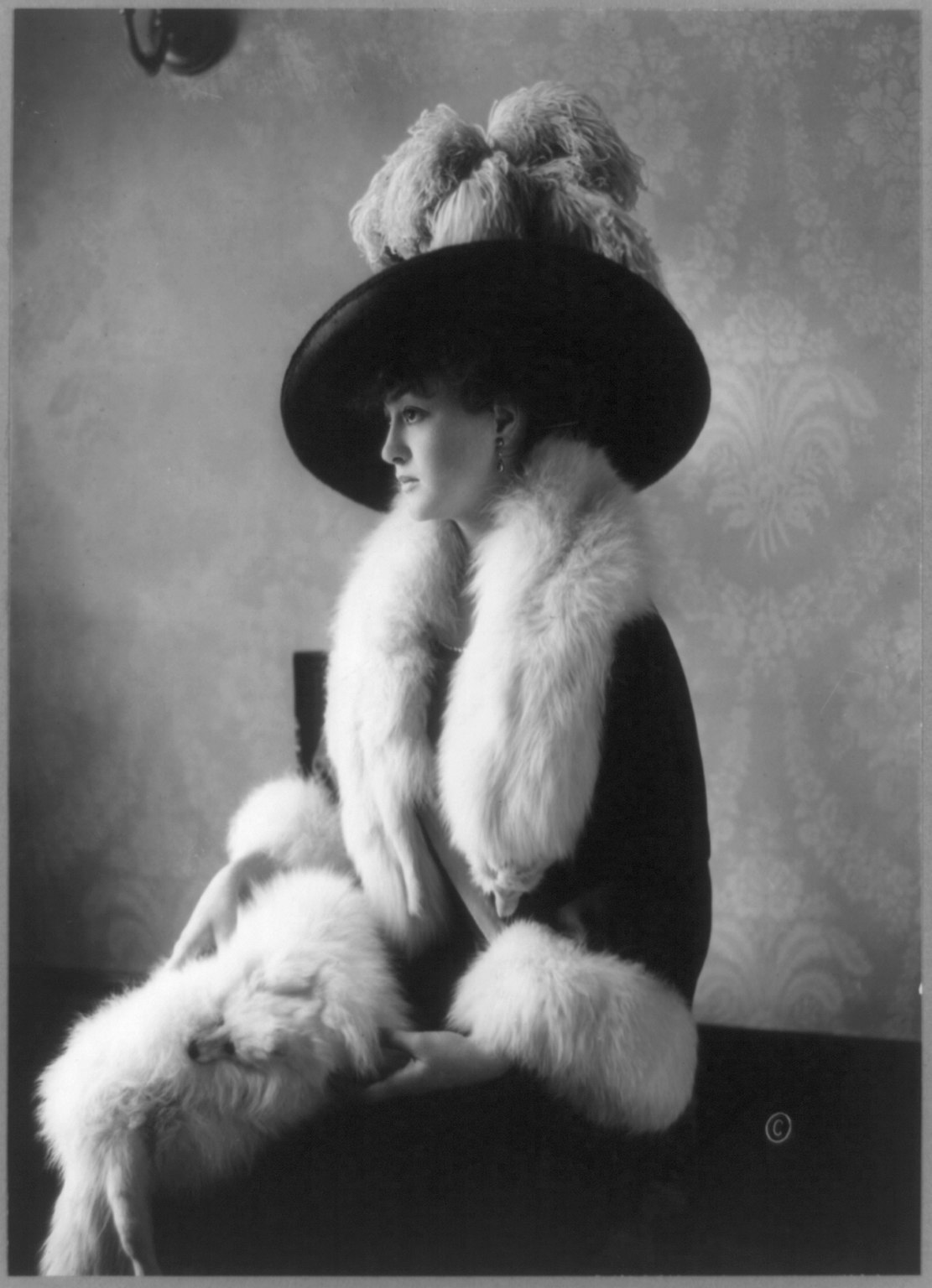
1911

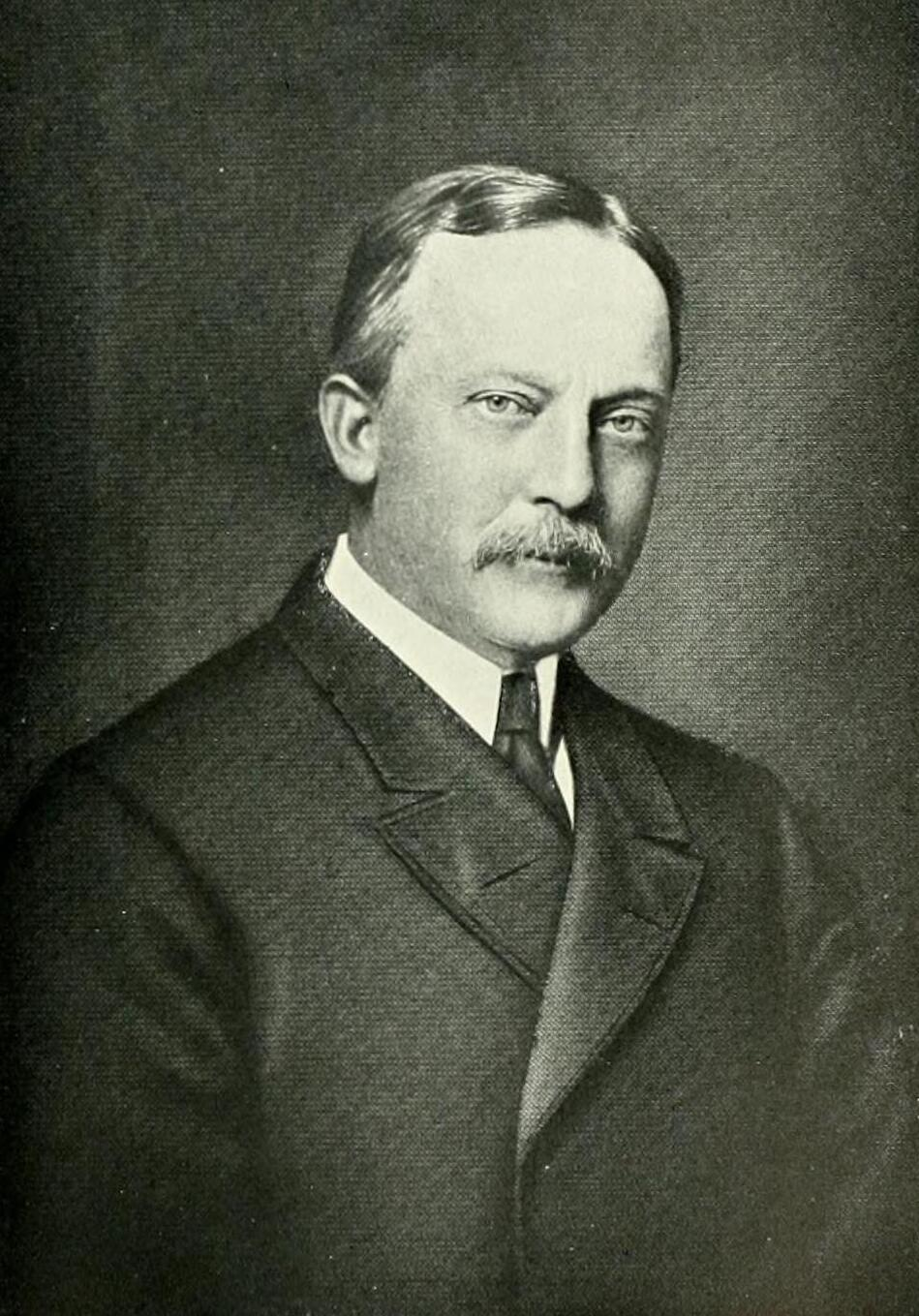
Portrait of Walter B. Brooks Jr.

In 1911, at St. Thomas Episcopal Church, Washington, DC, she married Baltimore businessman Walter Booth Brooks Jr., in a ceremony called "one of the most brilliant social affairs in the Capital that season." They had three children:

- Evalyn Louise Brooks (1912–1965); married William Ross Howard III (1907–1978)
- Walter Booth Brooks III (1914–1981)
- Angela Brooks (1918–1918)

Brooks and Cromwell divorced in 1919.

In late 1921, Brooks met Brigadier General Douglas MacArthur. Walter Borneman describes Brooks at this time as “recently divorced, the mother of two young children, fabulously wealthy, and by all accounts the epitome of a liberated Roaring Twenties woman racing a breakneck speed to embrace far more rights than those granted by the recently ratified Nineteenth Amendment.” The pair announced their engagement in mid-January 1922 and were married on Valentine’s Day, at Louise’s stepfather’s Palm Beach villa.

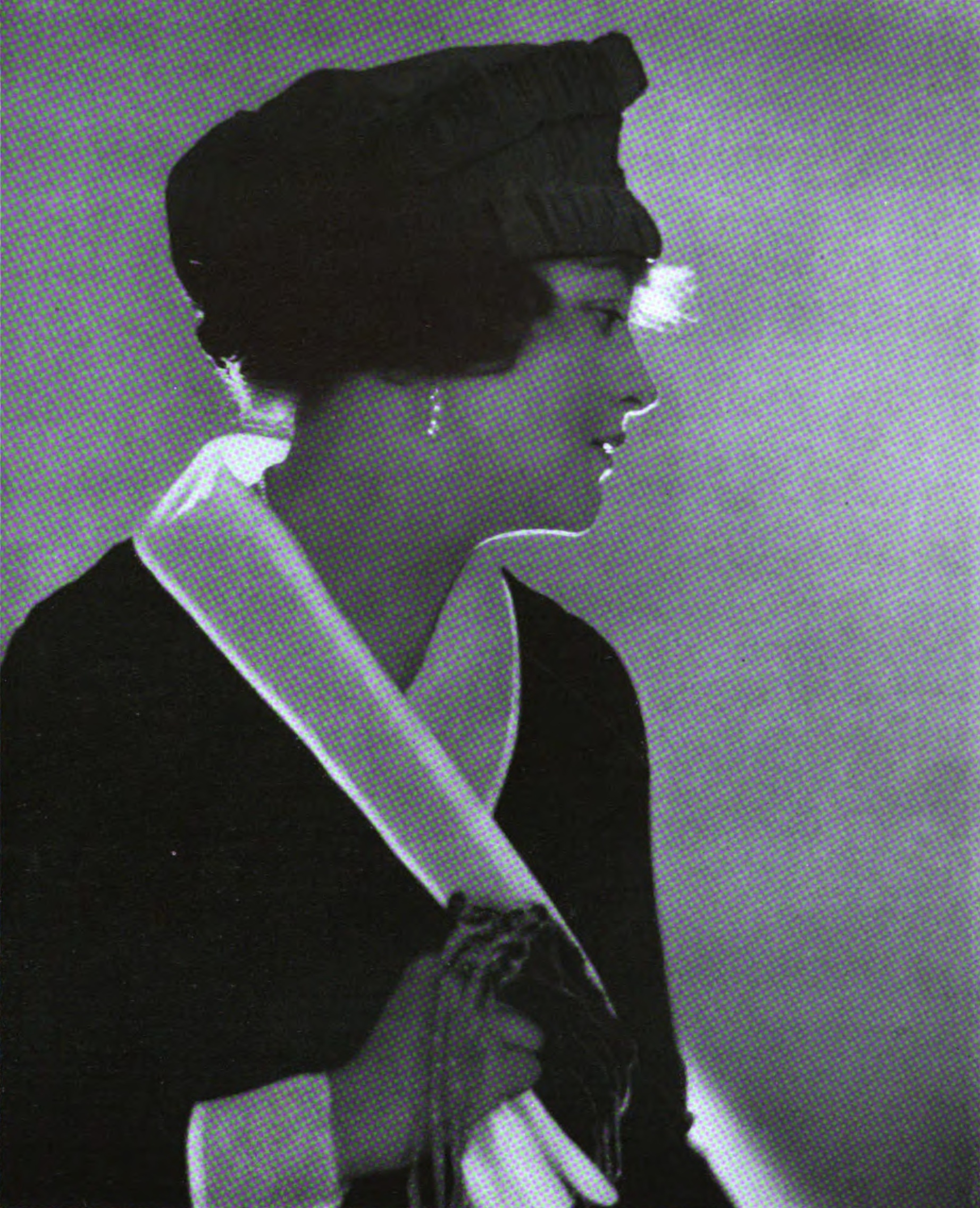
Mrs. Douglas Macarthur (Louise Cromwell Brooks) Vogue 1922

In September 1922, the couple set out for the Philippines, where MacArthur had been transferred for overseas service. William Manchester, in his biography of MacArthur, stated that General John J. Pershing, then the Army Chief of Staff, summarily transferred MacArthur from his post as Superintendent of West Point to the Philippines because Pershing was himself interested in Mrs. Brooks. She claimed that Pershing wanted to marry her and had threatened to send MacArthur to the Philippines if they married. Pershing said the allegation was "all damn poppycock". More recently, Richard B. Frank has written that Pershing and Brooks had already "severed" their relationship by the time of MacArthur's transfer; Brooks was, however, "informal[ly]" engaged to a close aide of Pershing's (she broke off the relationship in order to accept MacArthur's proposal). Pershing's letter concerning MacArthur's transfer predated—by a few days—Brooks's and MacArthur's engagement announcement, though this did not dispel the newspaper gossip.

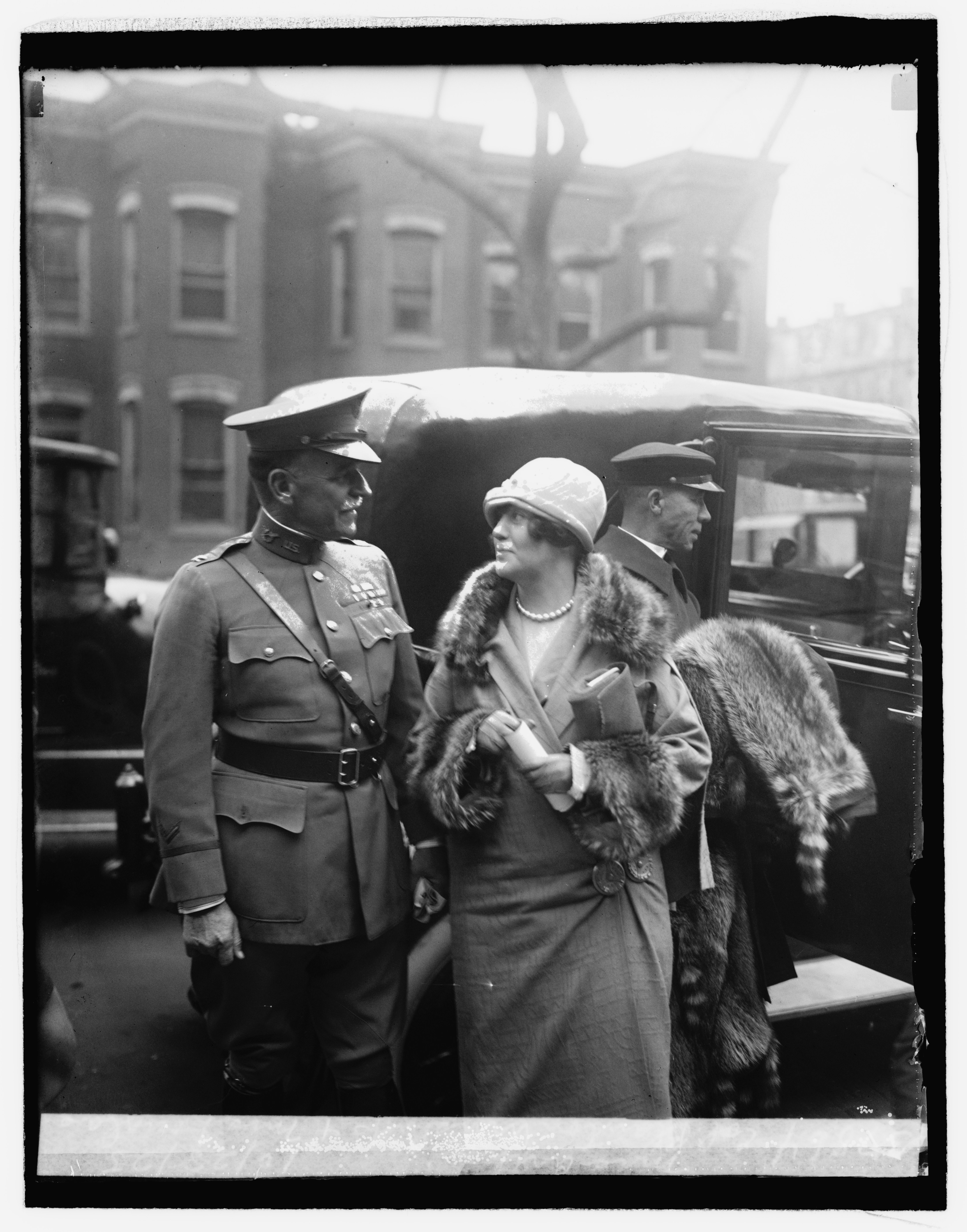
Col. Blanton Winship & Mrs. Douglas MacArthur, 10-28-25

In January 1925, MacArthur was promoted, becoming the youngest major general in the U.S. Army; he and his wife returned to America, choosing to live at Louise’s estate, near Baltimore (and Washington, D.C.). In 1928, MacArthur set out again for the Philippines, this time as commander of the Philippine Department. This time, with his marriage deteriorating, the general travelled alone; Louise had moved out of the estate with her children, adopting as her residence the entire twenty-sixth floor of the Beverly Hotel in Manhattan. Brooks's marriage to MacArthur ended in divorce in 1929, on the nominal charge of "failure to support", though both later acknowledged the real reason to be "incompatibility". MacArthur gave the marriage only one sentence in his memoirs; "In February 1922 I entered into matrimony, but it was not successful, and ended in divorce years later for mutual incompatibility."

She next married the actor Lionel Atwill, whom she divorced in 1943. In 1944 she married bandleader Alf Heiberg, then a Lieutenant Colonel in the US Army Air Force and the first leader of the US Air Force Band. That marriage also ended in divorce.

Brooks died of a heart attack in Washington, DC at the age of 74.
