= Stotesbury Club House =

Historic place in Pennsylvania, United States

- U.S. National Register of Historic Places
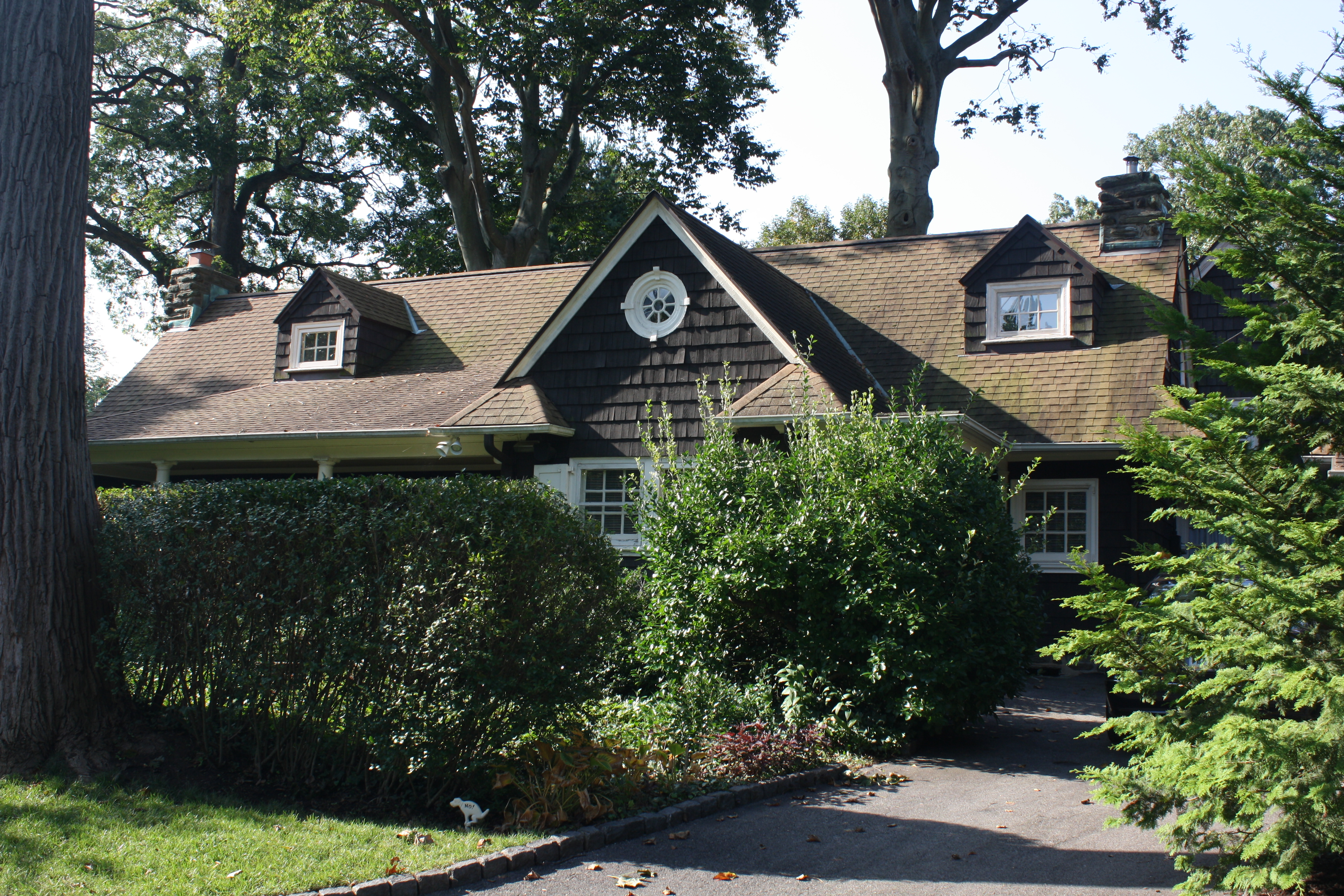
- Stotesbury Club House. September 2012.

- Location within Pennsylvania Location within the United States
- Location: 7830 Eastern Ave., Wyndmoor, Pennsylvania
- Coordinates: 40°4′58″N 75°11′44″W
- Area: 0.2 acres (0.081 ha)
- Built: 1904–1908, 1927
- Architect: Edwin A. Yeo
- Architectural style: Arts & Crafts
- NRHP reference No.: 85000468
- Added to NRHP: March 7, 1985

The Stotesbury Club House is a historic American clubhouse in Wyndmoor in Springfield Township, Montgomery County, Pennsylvania.

It was added to the National Register of Historic Places in 1985.

== History and architectural features ==
Built between 1904 and 1908 for Edward T. Stotesbury (1849-1938) as an equestrian center building, this historic structure is a 1 1/2-story, L-shaped, frame building that was designed in the Arts and Crafts style. It has a gable roof and a shingled-gable dormer. The front facade features an open porch that is supported by three Doric order columns; the rear has a raised flat-stone patio. Stotesbury sold the house in 1924. An addition was then completed in 1927.
