= James H. R. Cromwell =

American diplomat (1896–1990)

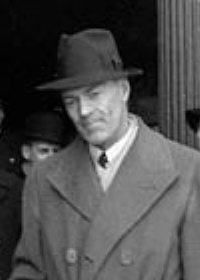

6th United States Ambassador to Canada
- In office January 25, 1940 – May 25, 1940
- President: Franklin Delano Roosevelt
- Preceded by: Daniel Calhoun Roper
- Succeeded by: Jay Pierrepont Moffat

Personal details
- Born: James Henry Roberts Cromwell; June 4, 1896 Manhattan, New York, U.S.
- Died: March 19, 1990 (aged 93) Mill Valley, California, U.S.
- Party: Democratic
- Spouse(s): Delphine Ione Dodge (m. 1920; div. 1928) Doris Duke (m. 1935; div. 1943) Maxine MacFetridge (m. 1948; died 1968) Germaine Benjamin (m. 1971; died 1986)
- Children: 3
- Relatives: Louise Cromwell Brooks (sister); Oliver Eaton Cromwell, Jr. (brother)

James Henry Roberts Cromwell (June 4, 1896 – March 19, 1990) was an American diplomat, candidate for the United States Senate, author, and one-time husband of Doris Duke, "the richest girl in the world". He was the United States Ambassador to Canada.

== Life and career ==
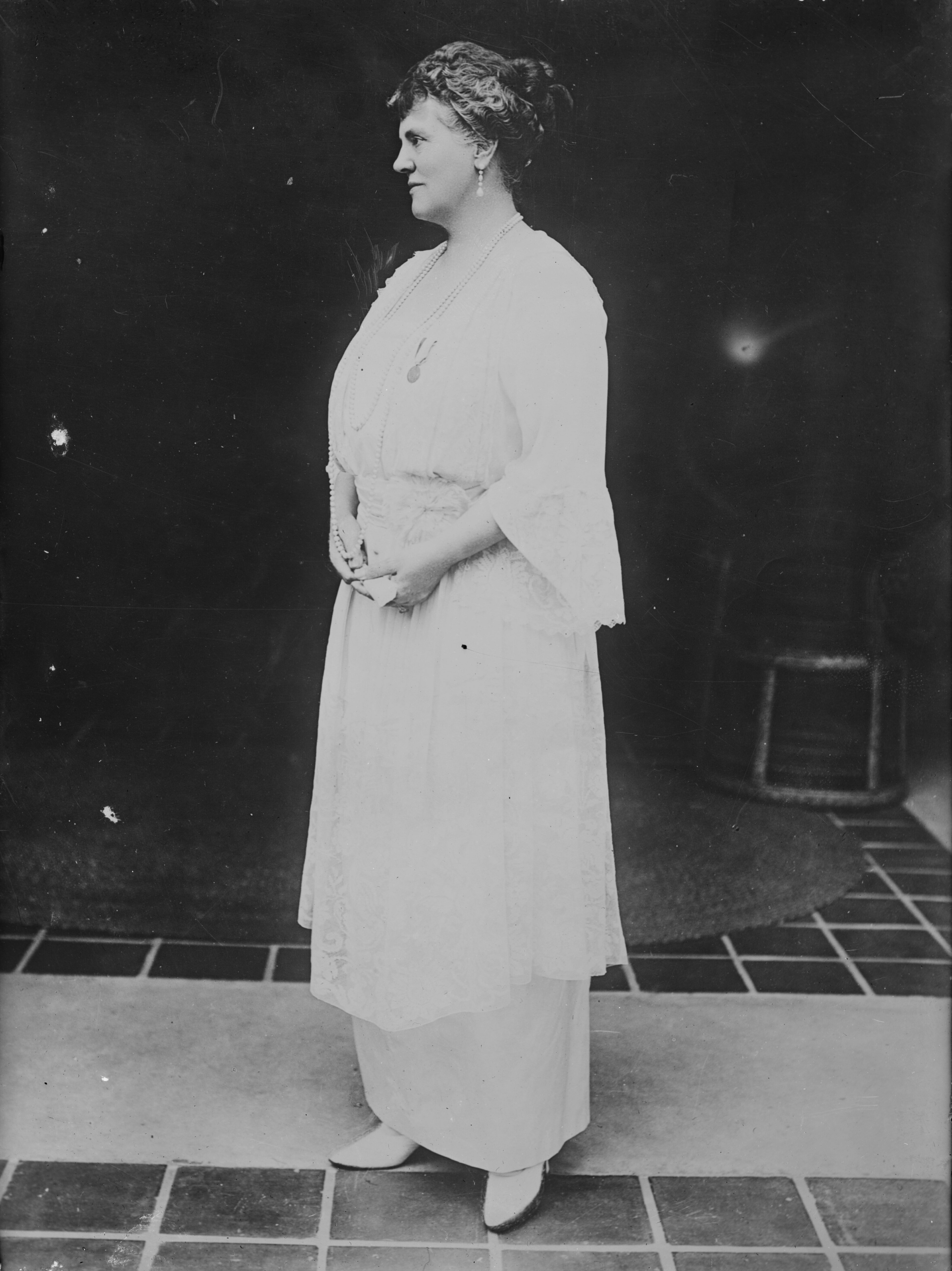
Lucretia Bishop "Eva" Roberts

He was born on June 4, 1896, in Manhattan, the son of Lucretia Bishop "Eva" Roberts and Oliver Eaton Cromwell. His sister Louise Cromwell Brooks was the first wife of General of the Army Douglas MacArthur and the third wife of the famous stage and film actor Lionel Atwill. He grew up in Philadelphia after his widowed mother married Edward T. Stotesbury in 1912 and moved there.

Cromwell's first wife was automotive company heiress Delphine Ione Dodge, the only daughter of Horace Dodge of Grosse Pointe, Michigan, one of the two co-founders of the Dodge Motor Company. They were married from June 17, 1920, until their divorce on September 28, 1928, and had one daughter, Christine Cromwell, in 1922.

On February 13, 1935, Cromwell married Doris Duke. Both supported Franklin Roosevelt and his New Deal. He published books to present his economic ideas and advocated tighter control of the Federal Reserve. In 1940, for 142 days, he was the United States Ambassador to Canada. He resigned to enter the election for U.S. Senator from New Jersey, a race he lost to incumbent Senator William Warren Barbour. After bitter and protracted legal proceedings Cromwell and Duke divorced on December 21, 1943. They had a daughter Arden Cromwell born July 11, 1940 who died a day later.

Cromwell was married to his third wife, Maxine MacFetridge, from April 24, 1948, until her death on July 7, 1968. Their daughter, Maxine Hope Cromwell (later Hopkins), was born in New York on November 17, 1948. Germaine Benjamin was Cromwell's fourth and last wife, from September 27, 1971, until her death in December 1986.

Cromwell died in the Marin Terrace retirement home in Mill Valley, California, at the age of 93.

== Books by Cromwell ==
- The Voice of Young America, C. Scribner's sons, 1933
- In Defense of Capitalism, C. Scribner's sons, 1937

Party political offices
Preceded by William H. J. Ely	Democratic Nominee for the U.S. Senate (Class 1) from New Jersey; 1940	Succeeded by Elmer H. Wene
