= Mount Engelhard =

Mountain in Jasper National Park, Alberta, Canada

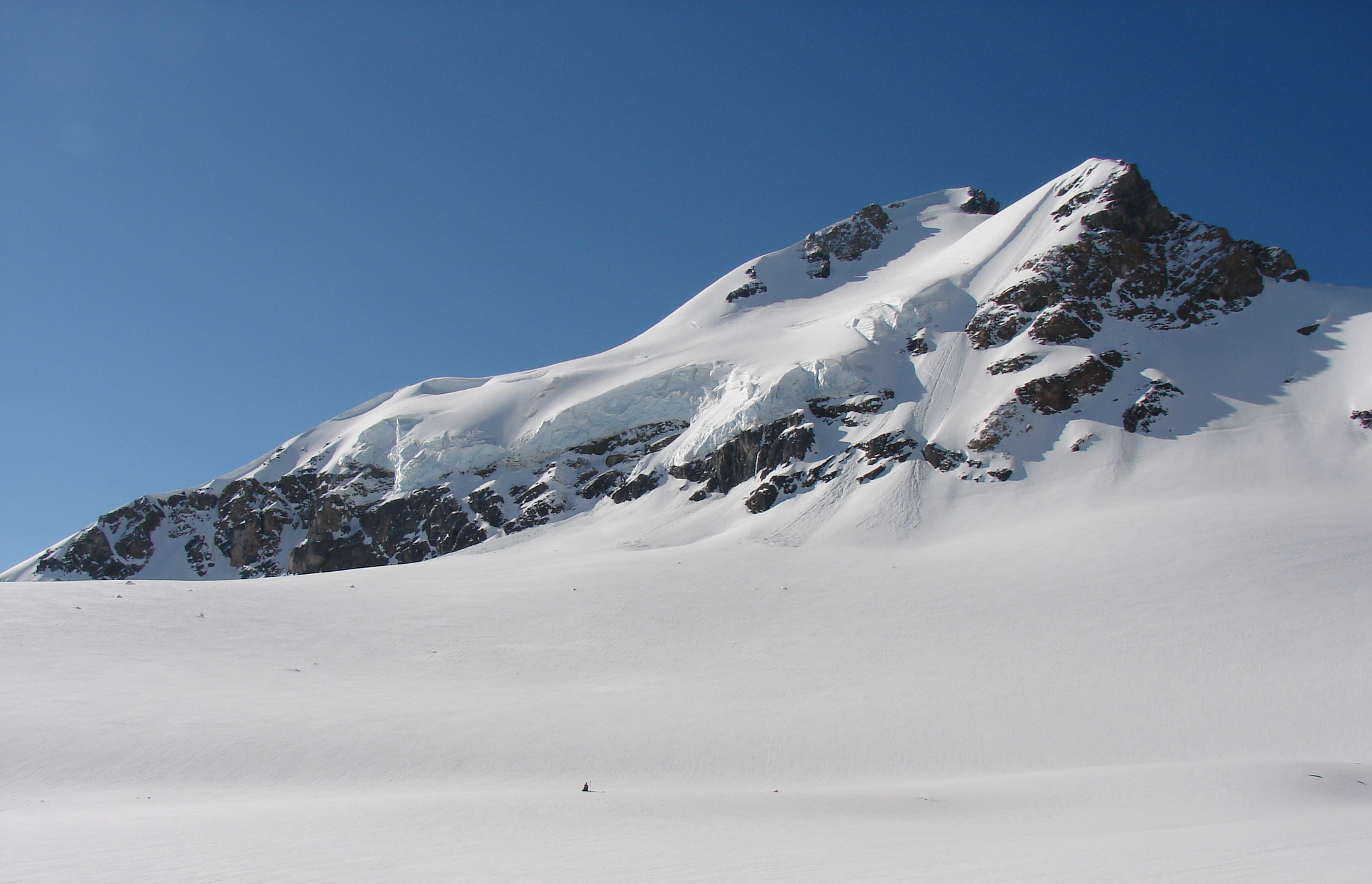
- NE face of Mt. Engelhard

Highest point
- Elevation: 3,270 m (10,730 ft)
- Prominence: 210 m (690 ft)
- Parent peak: Mount Cromwell (3330 m)
- Listing: Mountains of Alberta
- Coordinates: 52°16′31″N 117°24′25″W

Geography
- Location within Alberta Location within Canada
- Country: Canada
- Province: Alberta
- Protected area: Jasper National Park
- Parent range: Winston Churchill Range
- Topo map: NTS 83C6 Sunwapta Peak

Climbing
- First ascent: 1930
- Easiest route: rock/snow climb

Mount Engelhard is a 3,270-metre (10,730-foot) mountain summit located between the Athabasca River valley and Sunwapta River valley of Jasper National Park, in the Canadian Rockies of Alberta, Canada. Engelhard lies one kilometre northwest of Mount Cromwell, and three km NNE of the east summit of Stutfield Peak. The mountain was named in 1966 after Georgia Engelhard, an American who climbed for 15 years in the Canadian Rockies.

The first ascent was made in 1930 by W. Hainsworth, J.F. Lehmann, M.M. Strumia, and N.D. Waffl.

== Climate ==
Based on the Köppen climate classification, Mount Engelhard is located in a subarctic climate with cold, snowy winters, and mild summers. Temperatures can drop below −20 °C (−4 °F) with wind chill factors below −30 °C (−22 °F). Precipitation runoff from the mountain drains into tributaries of the Athabasca River.

== Gallery ==
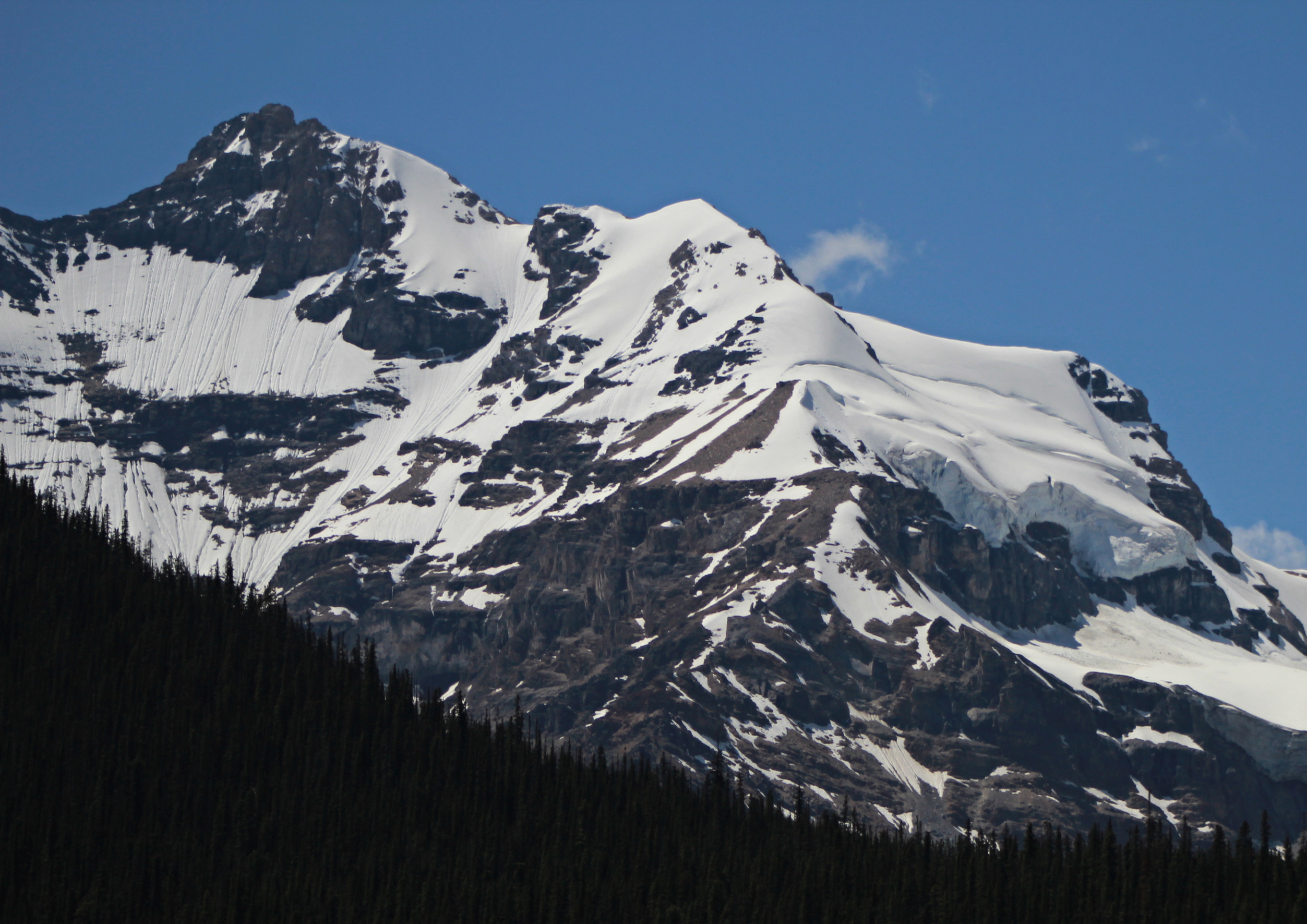
Mount Engelhard seen from the Icefields Parkway

== See also ==
- List of mountains in the Canadian Rockies
- Geography of Alberta
