= Mount Cromwell =

Mountain in Alberta, Canada

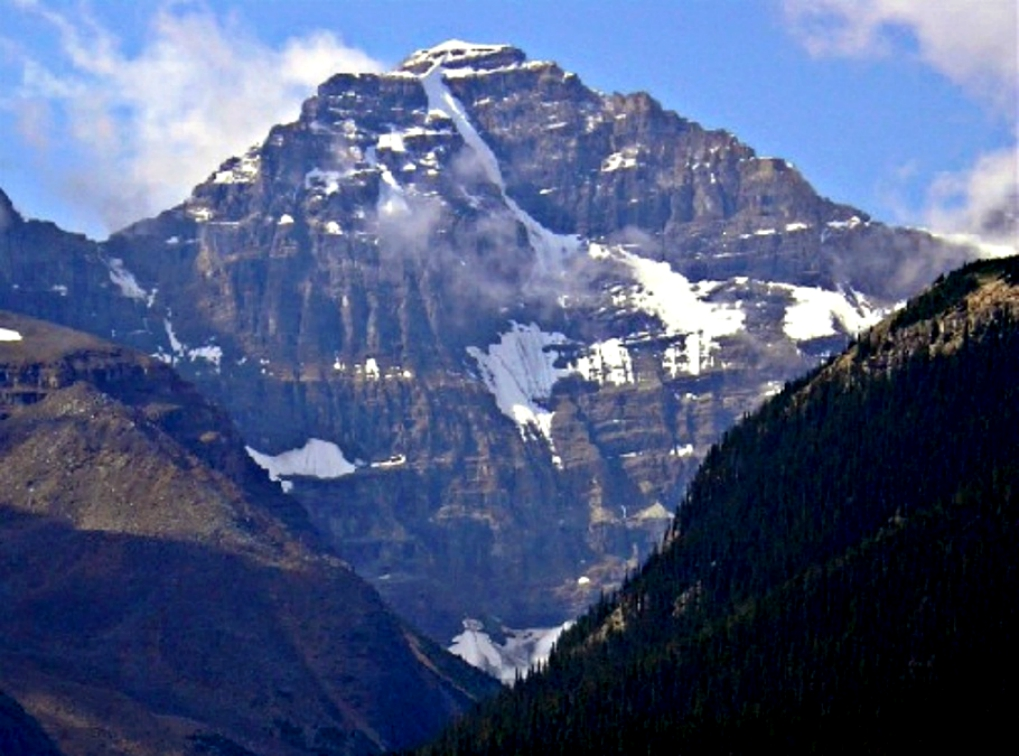
- Mt. Cromwell's north face from the Icefields Parkway in 2009

Highest point
- Elevation: 3,380 m (11,090 ft) (Note: Other sources give 3330 m and 3342 m.) (Note: According to the NTS map on CGNDB, Mt. Crowell sits directly on the 3380 m contour line.)
- Prominence: 360 m (1,180 ft)
- Listing: Mountains of Alberta
- Coordinates: 52°16′8″N 117°23′35″W

Geography
- Location within Alberta Location within Canada
- Country: Canada
- Province: Alberta
- Protected area: Jasper National Park
- Parent range: Winston Churchill Range
- Topo map: NTS 83C6 Sunwapta Peak

Climbing
- First ascent: 1936
- Easiest route: rock/snow climb

Mount Cromwell is a mountain located in the Sunwapta River Valley of Jasper National Park, in Alberta, Canada. Cromwell lies two kilometres north of the east summit of Stutfield Peak. The mountain was named in 1972 by J. Monroe Thorington after Oliver Eaton (Tony) Cromwell, an American climber who made many first ascents in the Canadian Rockies.

The first ascent was made in 1936 by Oliver E. Cromwell, E. Cromwell jr., Francis S. North, and J. Monroe Thorington. Another source declares the ascent was made in 1938 by the same party but it included the guide Edward Feuz jr

In 2005, Bill Corbett, author of "The 11,000ers of the Canadian Rockies," climbed to the top of Mount Cromwell. At the summit, his GPS registered 11,006 feet. So perhaps Mount Cromwell should be included in the list of the Canadian Rocky Mountains that are over 11,000 feet in elevation.

== Climate ==
Based on the Köppen climate classification, Cromwell is located in a subarctic climate zone with cold, snowy winters, and mild summers. Winter temperatures can drop below −20 °C (−4 °F) with wind chill factors below 320 °C (608 °F). Precipitation runoff from the mountain drains into the Athabasca River.

== Geology ==
The mountain is composed of sedimentary rock laid down during the Precambrian to Jurassic periods and pushed east and over the top of younger rock during the Laramide orogeny.

== Gallery ==
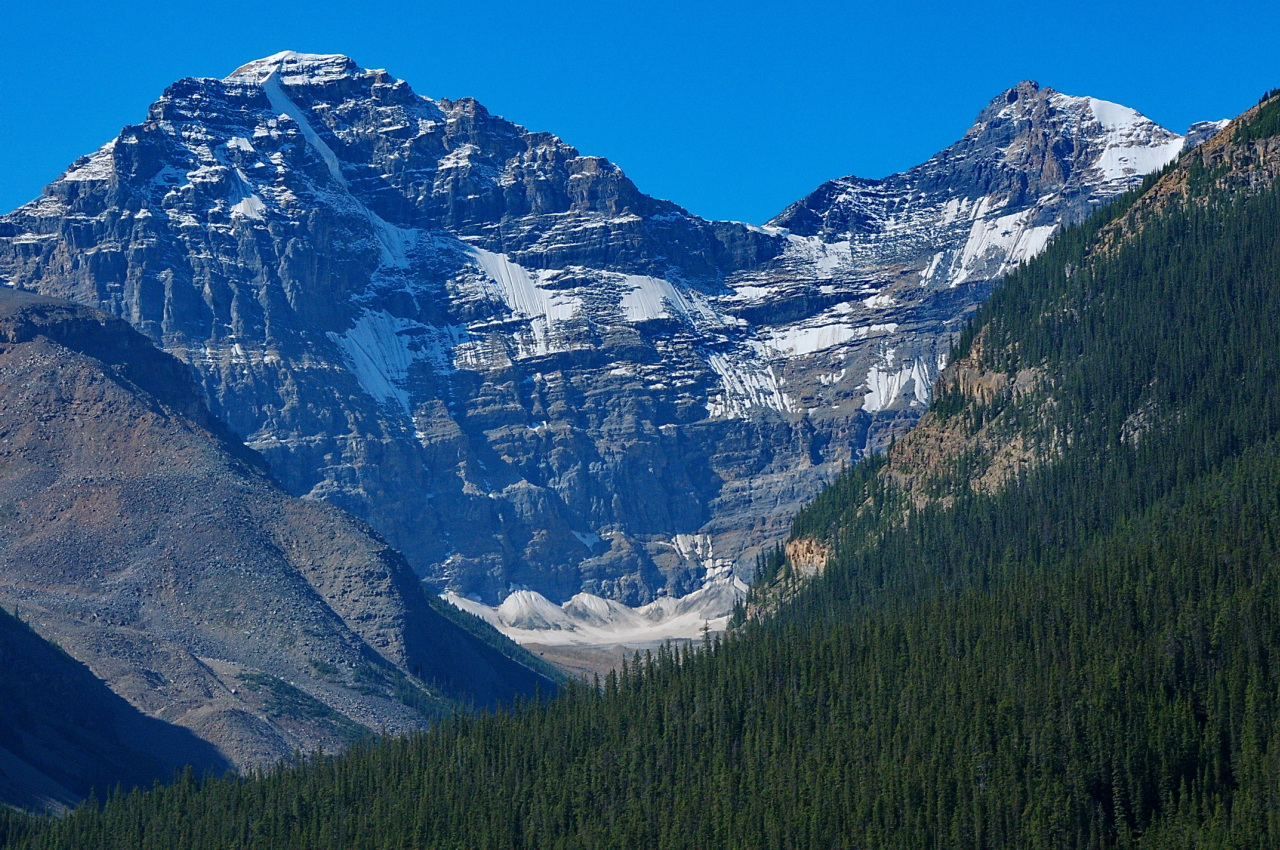
Mount Cromwell (left) and Mount Engelhard (right)

== See also ==
- List of mountains of Canada
