= Georgie Woods =

American radio personality

Georgie Woods (1927 – June 18, 2005) was an American radio personality who was best known for his broadcasting career in the Philadelphia, Pennsylvania area.

Woods came to Philadelphia from New York in 1953 and began broadcasting from AM stations such as WDAS and WHAT. He was a consultant to Dick Clark, advising him which records were popular in the African-American community. He went on to play the talents of emerging artists like The Temptations, Stevie Wonder and Michael Jackson over the radio.

In the 1960s, Woods used the airwaves to talk about the American civil rights movement. He was often known to stop playing music to talk about the efforts of African-Americans and others who were campaigning for equality, and about the work of the movement's leaders such as Dr. Martin Luther King Jr. He was also the first to use the term "blue-eyed soul", to describe soul music that was sung by White artists, rather than Black artists.

In 1963, Woods and WDAS radio station General manager Bob Klein chartered buses to take people down to the August 28, 1963 March on Washington, D.C. (subsequently famous for its "I Have a Dream" speech by Dr. Martin Luther King Jr.) and had asked a young Ed Bradley, who later went on to be a well-known CBS correspondent, to be a bus captain.

According to news reports, he was due to return to Philadelphia in the fall of 2005 to be inducted into the Philadelphia Broadcast Pioneers Hall of Fame.
