= Edward T. Stotesbury =

American banker (1849–1938)

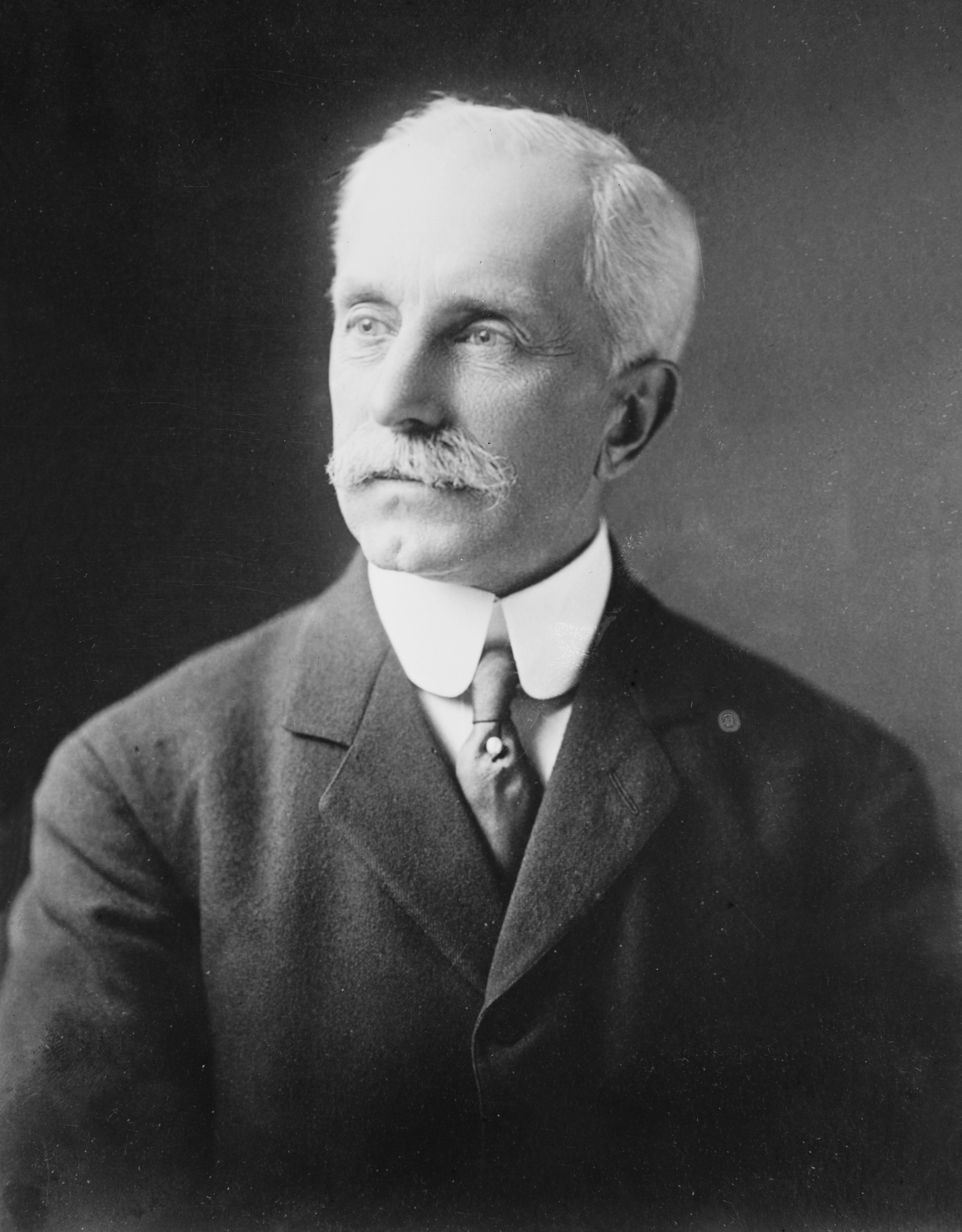
Stotesbury, c. 1909

Edward Townsend "Ned" Stotesbury (February 26, 1849 – May 16, 1938) was a prominent investment banker, a partner in Philadelphia's Drexel & Co. and its New York affiliate J. P. Morgan & Co. for over fifty-five years. He was involved in the financing of many railroads. Stotesbury, West Virginia, a coal mining town in Raleigh County, is named for him, as well as his equestrian estate, the Stotesbury Club House. Several of the palatial estates he built with his second wife have been demolished in the years since his death.

== Early life and first marriage ==
Stotesbury was born in Philadelphia, Pennsylvania of Quaker parentage, and attended Union Business College (now Peirce College). His first wife was Frances Berman Butcher. Their first daughter, Helen Lewis Stotesbury (August 21, 1874 – September 9, 1874), died an infant. They had another daughter in 1877 and Frances died giving birth to a third on November 7, 1881, at the age of 31.

== Career ==
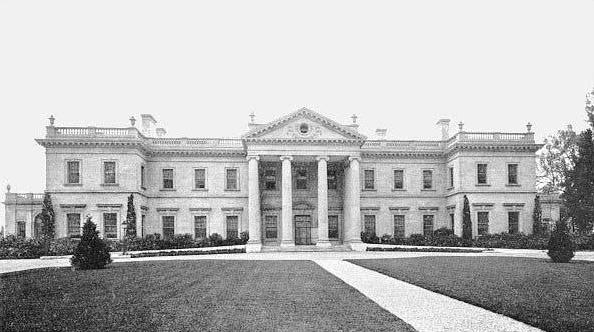
Whitemarsh Hall, Wyndmoor, Pennsylvania (1916–21, demolished 1980), Horace Trumbauer, architect. Photo: c.1922.

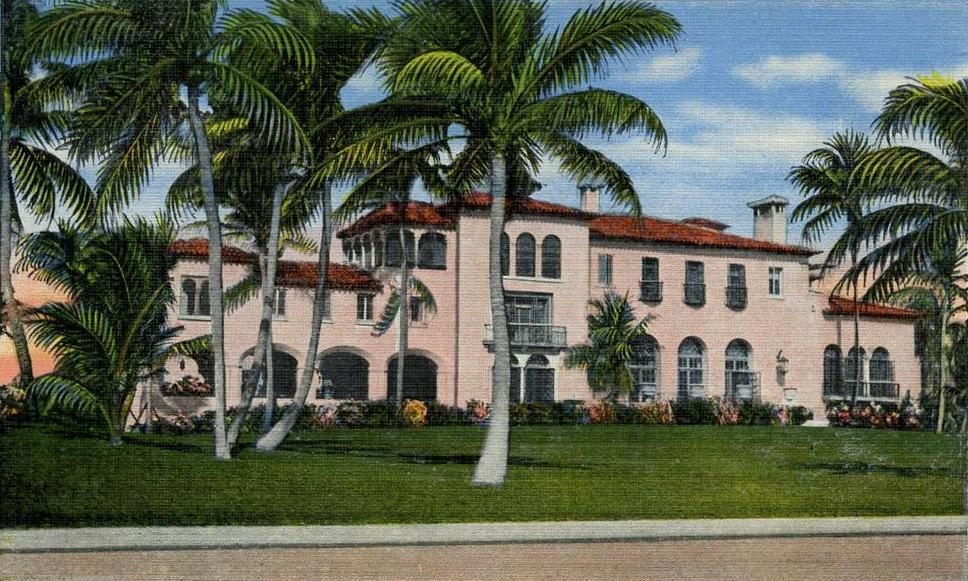
El Mirasol, Palm Beach, Florida (1919, demolished 1950s), Addison Mizner, architect. Photo: c.1920.

Stotesbury got his start working for Drexel & Co., the well-known Philadelphia banking house founded by Francis Martin Drexel and later directed by his son Anthony Joseph Drexel. He was always punctual, never absent. He kept meticulous records of every penny he spent. When Drexel went into partnership with J.P. Morgan, Stotesbury received a lucrative post. In 1882, he was made a partner. Years later he often told the simple story of his success: "Keep your mouth shut and your ears open."

One of the significant services which he performed in the course of his business career was assisting in the floating of the International Chinese Loan of 1909. He was a director of the Reading Railroad, the Lehigh Valley Railroad, the Philadelphia Fidelity Bank, the Girard Trust Company, the Cambria Iron Company, Pennsylvania Steel Company, Latrobe Steel Company, Penn Mutual Life Insurance Company, Keystone Watch Company, and the Jessup and Moore Paper Company. He also served as the President of Philadelphia's Art Jury and Fairmount Park Art Association (now the Association for Public Art). He was a member of the Five O'Clock Club of Philadelphia.

== Second marriage and later career ==
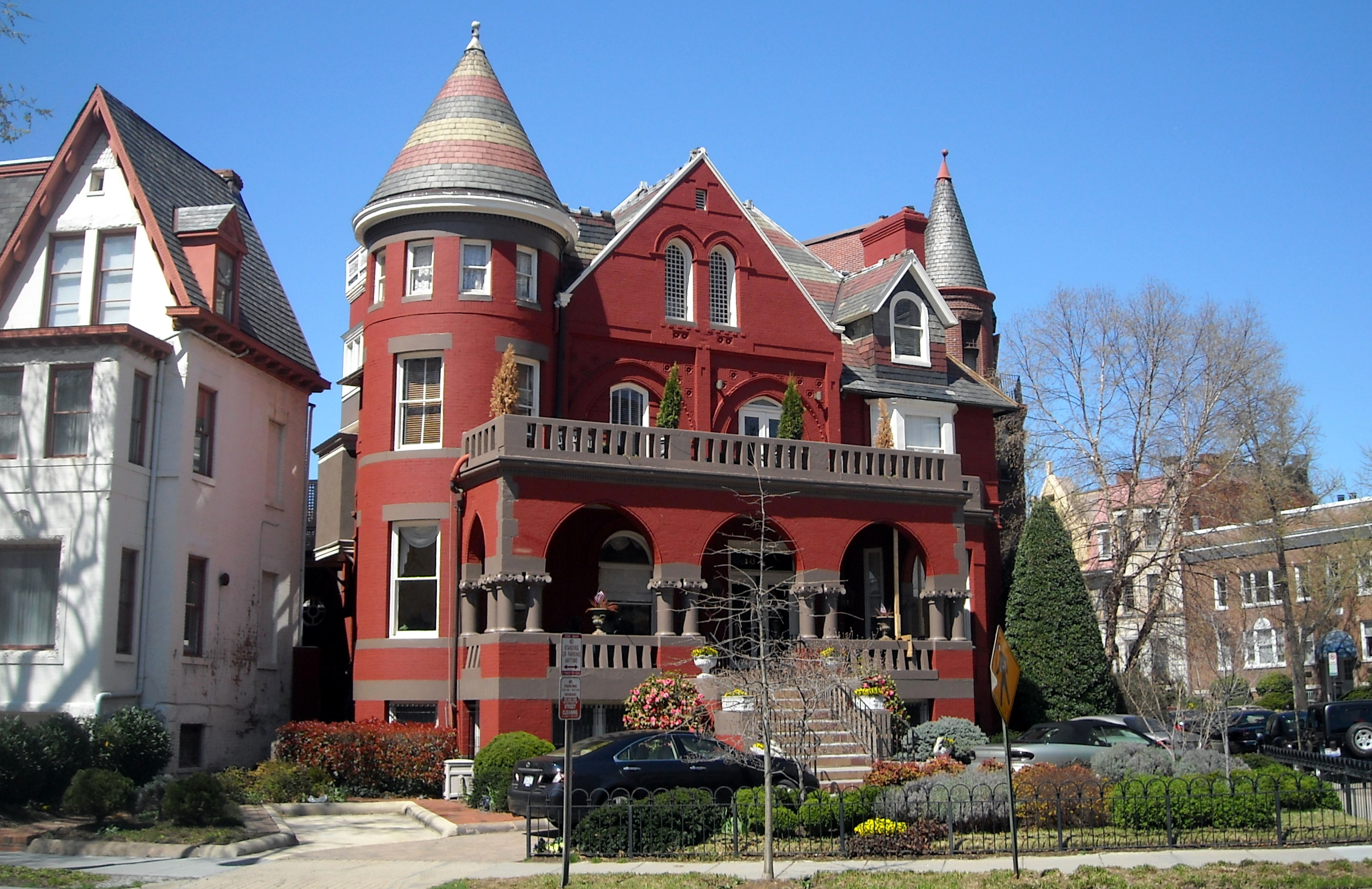
The Swann House, venue of Stotesbury's wedding to Eva Roberts Cromwell

On January 18, 1912, after having been a widower for thirty-some years, Stotesbury married widow Lucretia Bishop "Eva" Roberts, becoming the stepfather of Oliver Eaton Cromwell Jr., James H. R. Cromwell, and Louise Cromwell. James worked at Drexel and Company after his World War I service.

The couple's first project together was redecorating his Philadelphia townhouses at 1923–25 Walnut Street. They went on to build three palatial estates:

- Whitemarsh Hall outside Philadelphia by architect Horace Trumbauer (1916–21, demolished 1980)
- El Mirasol in Palm Beach, Florida by architect Addison Mizner (1919, demolished 1950s)
- Wingwood House in Bar Harbor, Maine by architectural firm Magaziner, Eberhard & Harris (1927, demolished 1953)

In 1927, Stotesbury's fortune was estimated at $100 million ($1.9 billion today). While he withdrew $55 million from his J.P. Morgan account during the Great Depression, the stock market crash and the depression further drained the value of his fortune, leaving him with an estimated $4 million ($100 million today) at the time of his death in 1938.

Stotesbury died at eighty-nine on May 21, 1938, in Wyndmoor, Pennsylvania and was buried in The Woodlands Cemetery in Philadelphia.

== Legacy ==
Every year since 1927, the Stotesbury Cup Regatta has been held on the Schuylkill River in Philadelphia. It is one of the oldest and largest high school rowing regattas in the United States. Stotesbury was a member and one-time president of the Bachelors Barge Club, one of the rowing clubs in Philadelphia.

Stotesbury, West Virginia, a coal mining town in Raleigh County, was named for Stotesbury. The town was the former home of eight-term U.S. Senator Robert C. Byrd.

The Stotesbury Club House, a building on Stotesbury's equestrian farm in Wyndmoor, Pennsylvania, was listed on the National Register of Historic Places in 1985.

Edward and Eva Stotesbury are characters in the Stephen Sondheim musical Road Show (2008).

The land on which Whitemarsh Hall was built was developed into a town house complex named after Stotesbury.

== Family ==
Stotesbury's second daughter, Edith Lewis Stotesbury (April 3, 1877 – 1935), married Sydney Emlen Hutchinson on December 25, 1903. His third daughter, Frances Butcher Stotesbury (November 7, 1881 – October 14, 1950), married John Kearsley Mitchell on January 5, 1909.

On February 14, 1922, his stepdaughter, Henrietta Louise Cromwell, a divorcee with two children, married General of the Army Douglas MacArthur. They divorced in 1929.

His stepson, James H.R. Cromwell became a devoted New Dealer. One day in 1936, when Cromwell was then married to Doris Duke, Stotesbury told him, "It's a good thing you married the richest girl in the world because you will get very little from me. I made my fortune and I am going to squander it myself; not your friend Roosevelt."
