= Louis Magaziner =

American architect

Louis Magaziner (March 7, 1878 – May 19, 1956) was the senior partner of a series of architectural firms based in Philadelphia, Pennsylvania. Born in Hungary, he came to the U.S. with his parents and graduated from the University of Pennsylvania as an architect in 1900.

His firms included Magaziner, Eberhard & Harris, credited with the design of eight theaters including the Broadway Theatre at 43 S. Broadway in Pitman, New Jersey; Felton Theatre (1925 remodel of 1919 building) at 4800 Rising Sun Avenue in Philadelphia (since converted into a supper club); Lansdale Theater at 545 W. Main Street in Lansdale, PA (since demolished); Media Theatre for the Performing Arts at 104 E. State Street in Media, PA; Midway Theatre at 1835 E. Allegheny Avenue in Philadelphia, PA; Ogontz Theatre at 6033 Ogontz Avenue in Philadelphia, PA; Rockland Theater at 4910 N. Broad Street in Philadelphia; Uptown Theatre (Philadelphia) at 2240-2248 N. Broad Street in Philadelphia. The Broadway and Media theaters remain open.

The firm also designed the Wingwood House in Bar Harbor, Maine (1927) for Edward T. Stotesbury and his second wife. It was demolished in 1953.

The later works of his career were austere and modernist. These included the Sidney Hillman Medical Center (demolished in 2011), and a Conservative Synagogue (1949) at 53rd and Euclid Streets in Philadelphia.

The Magaziner Collection of architectural drawings is held at the Athenaeum of Philadelphia. Magaziner, Eberhard & Harris was a going concern from 1922 until 1930. His son Louis Magaziner's son Henry Magaziner was a well-respected architectural preservationist and author in Philadelphia.

== Early life ==
Louis Magaziner was a native of Hungary who came to the United States with his parents, Henry and Cecelia (Rosenbluth) Magaziner in 1887. He graduated from Central High School in 1896 and received his B.S. in Architecture from the University of Pennsylvania in 1900. He was a classmate and friend of Julian Abele (class of 1902).

== Career ==
Magaziner worked at firms including Frederick Mann, Cope & Stewardson, Albert Kelsey, and Newman & Harris (as head draftsman) before establishing his own firm, Magaziner & Potter, with William Woodburn Potter in 1907. The firm lasted until 1917 and was followed up by other partnerships including Magaziner & Eberhard; Magaziner, Eberhard & Harris, and Louis & Henry Magaziner. His firms produced theaters, mansions, colleges, hospitals, clubs, and banks. Magaziner became a member of the American Institute of Architects in 1942; practiced in Pennsylvania, New Jersey, and Ohio; and was a founder of the Homewood School (formerly known as the Hebrew Sheltering Home).

== Legacy ==
His son Henry Jonas Magaziner was a prominent preservationist, author and architect. Father and son practiced architecture when not interrupted by the Great Depression and World War II, before Henry set off on his own as an architect and then preservationist and author. He wrote the books The Golden Age of Iron Work and Our Liberty Bell. The Henry Magaziner Award is given by the Philadelphia branch of the American Institutes for Architecture.

== Works ==
- Sidney Hillman Medical Center (1950), was a modernist structure designed by Louis Magaziner and Herman Polss. It was demolished in 2011.
- Uptown Theater (Philadelphia) (1927), listed on the National Register of Historic Places
- Mount Sinai Hospital, Philadelphia, built from 1921 through 1939
- Gertrude Kistler Memorial Library (1926) at Rosemont College (Magaziner, Eberhard & Harris)
- Tasker Street Homes (1937), Philadelphia, PA. Demolished in 2004
- Corn Exchange National Bank, 125-135 Chestnut
- Silverman & Son, store, 6th & South Sts., Philadelphia, PA
- Washington Collegiate Institute, Washington, N.C.
- Calvary Church, Germantown, Philadelphia, PA
- John Snead Seminary, Boaz, AL
- Synagogue (1912)
- Fels residence (1907) 39th and Walnut
