= Alfred Magaziner =

Austrian journalist

Alfred Magaziner (January 8, 1902 to May 19, 1956) was an Austrian journalist.

== Life ==
Magaziner was the son of railroad employee Arthur Magaziner and seamstress Melanie Stein.

Magaziner completed an apprenticeship in bookselling and became an official in the Socialist Workers' Youth association and a member of the Social Democratic Workers Party. In 1926, he received official training at the Workers' College. Magaziner began to make a name for himself as a contributor to social democratic and liberal newspapers and though 1933 to 1934 he was an editor of the Social Democratic Correspondences. From 1936 and onwards, Magaziner lived in Zagreb and reported from there as a foreign correspondent for the New York Times and the Daily Telegraph. In 1938, Magaziner emigrated to England and after the outbreak of war in 1939 was initially interned in Australia as an enemy alien. In 1947, Magaziner, who had remained politically active even in exile, returned to Austria. He worked as editor of the Kleines Blatt and editor-in-chief of the Weltpresse. For 22 years he was the managing editor of the magazine Die Zukunft, which he ran as an open discussion organ.

== Publications ==
Maganziner published several books of a historical-biographical nature on the history of the workers movement.

- The Pioneers. Vienna 1975 (From the History of the Labor Movement, Volume 1)
- The Pioneers. Vienna 1979 (From the History of the Workers' Movement, Volume 2)
- The Pioneers. Vienna 1985 (From the History of the Workers' movement, Volume 3)
