= Oliver Eaton Cromwell =

American mountain climber (1892–1987)

Oliver Eaton Cromwell Jr. (1892–1987), widely known as Tony Cromwell, was an American mountain climber who made many first ascents in the Canadian Rockies and was a member of the 1939 American Karakoram expedition to K2.

Mount Cromwell, a mountain in the Sunwapta River Valley of Jasper National Park, in Alberta, Canada, was named after him. The mountain was named in 1972 by J. Monroe Thorington, to commemorate Cromwell's many first ascents in the Canadian Rockies, including his 1938 first ascent of his namesake mountain.

The year after his first ascent of Mount Cromwell, Cromwell was a member, and base camp commander, of the tragic 1939 American Karakoram expedition to K2. In 1939, Cromwell and two fellow expedition leaders were implicated in a combination of miscommunication and poor decisions which contributed to the deaths of four expedition climbers.

After the K2 expedition, Cromwell moved to Switzerland and lived in Zermatt until the 1970s, he then relocated to Interlaken, Switzerland. After the death of his wife Georgia Engelhard, and having lived in Switzerland for over 30 years, he returned to the USA where he died on 14 Feb 1987 in Montgomery County, Pennsylvania aged 94.

== Family and facts ==
Cromwell married Georgia Engelhard in 1947, the marriage was Cromwell's third and Engelhard's first. The couple later moved to Switzerland.

- Stepson of Edward T. Stotesbury
- Brother of Louise Cromwell Brooks, and James H. R. Cromwell
- Former brother-in-law of Douglas MacArthur, Doris Duke, Delphine Dodge, and Lionel Atwill
