= Howser Peak =

Mountain in British Columbia, Canada

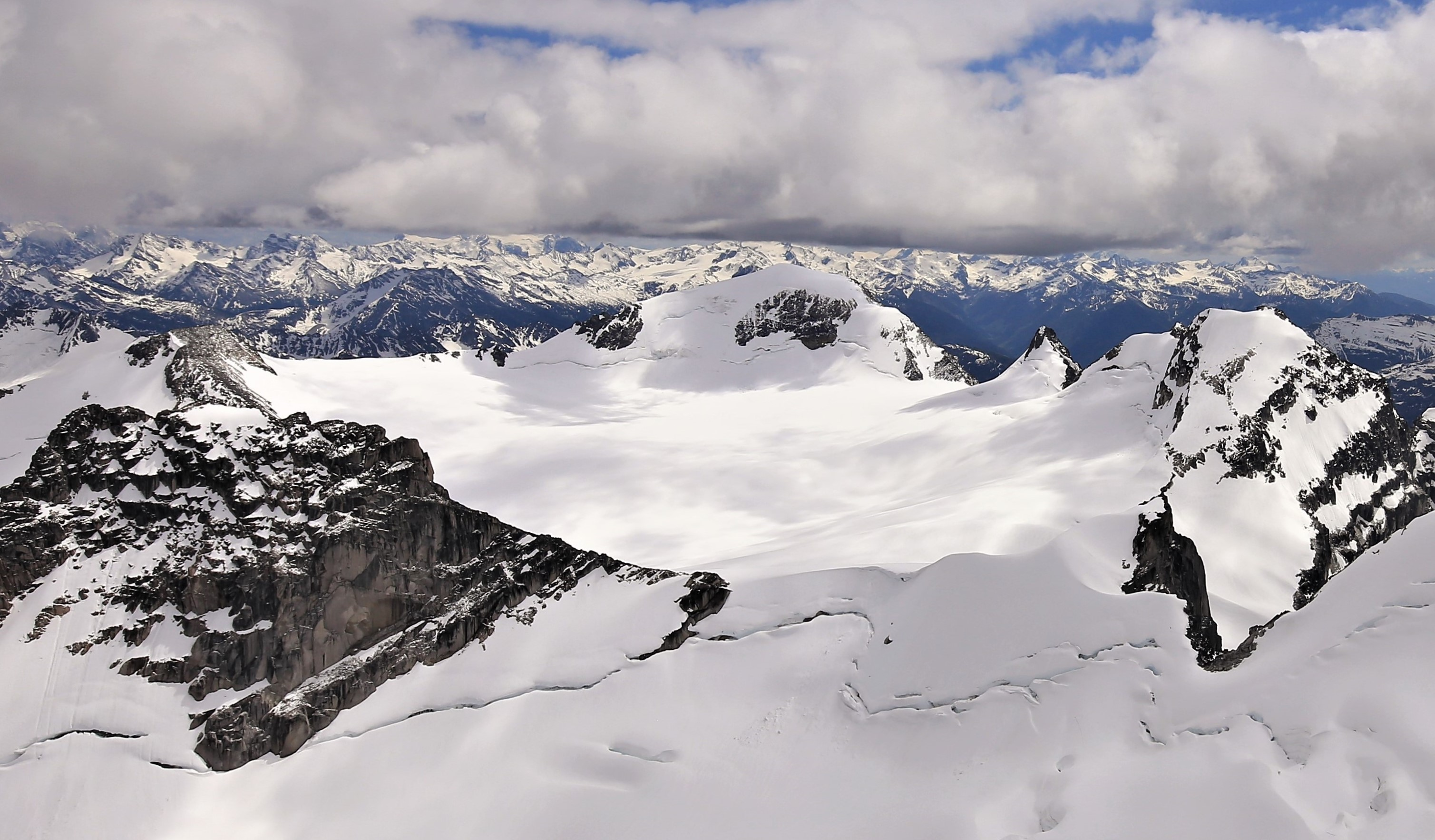
- North aspect, centered (Marmolata left and Flattop right)

Highest point
- Elevation: 3,094 m (10,151 ft)
- Prominence: 262 m (860 ft)
- Parent peak: Howser Spire (3,412 m)
- Isolation: 2.96 km (1.84 mi)
- Listing: Mountains of British Columbia
- Coordinates: 50°42′17″N 116°47′01″W

Geography
- Location within British Columbia Location within Canada
- Country: Canada
- Province: British Columbia
- District: Kootenay Land District
- Protected area: Bugaboo Provincial Park
- Parent range: Purcell Mountains; The Bugaboos
- Topo map: NTS 82K10 Howser Creek

Geology
- Rock age: 135 Million years ago
- Rock type: Granodiorite

Climbing
- First ascent: 1916 by Conrad Kain

Howser Peak is a 3,094-metre (10,151-foot) summit in The Bugaboos of British Columbia, Canada. It is located south of the Bugaboo Glacier and is the southernmost point of Bugaboo Provincial Park. Precipitation runoff from Howser Peak drains north into Bugaboo Creek which is a tributary of the Columbia River; as well as south to Duncan River via Howser Creek. Howser Peak is more notable for its steep rise above local terrain than for its absolute elevation as topographic relief is significant with the south aspect rising 1,380 meters (4,527 ft) in 2.5 km (1.6 mi).

== History ==
The mountain's toponym was published in "A Climber's Guide to the Interior Ranges of British Columbia" by J.M. Thorington in 1947, and it was officially adopted on October 29, 1962, by the Geographical Names Board of Canada. The peak is named in association with Howser Creek which in turn is named after prospector Fred Hauser who found placer gold there in the late 1800s.

The first ascent of the peak was made on August 28, 1916, by Conrad Kain and Captain Albert H. MacCarthy.

== Climate ==
Based on the Köppen climate classification, Howser Peak is located in a subarctic climate zone with cold, snowy winters, and mild summers. Winter temperatures can drop below −20 °C with wind chill factors below −30 °C. This climate supports the Bugaboo Glacier on the peak's north slope and smaller unnamed glaciers on the east and west slopes.

== See also ==
- The Bugaboos
- Geography of British Columbia
