= Peter Arrell Browne Widener II =

American racehorse owner (1895–1948)

- Born: June 25, 1895; Long Branch, New Jersey
- Died: April 20, 1948 (aged 52); Bryn Mawr, Pennsylvania
- Resting place: West Laurel Hill Cemetery, Philadelphia
- Education: Harvard University; University of Pennsylvania
- Occupations: Businessman, horseman, art collector, philanthropist
- Spouse(s): Gertrude Peabody (née Douglas), m. November 1924
- Children: Peter A. B. Widener III; Ella Anne Widener-Wetherill
- Parent(s): Joseph Early Widener; Eleanor Holmes Pancoast

Peter Arrell Browne Widener II (June 25, 1895 – April 20, 1948) was a prominent American racehorse owner and breeder. He inherited a fortune from his father, Joseph E. Widener, a founding benefactor of the National Gallery of Art in Washington, D.C. (and younger son of the extremely wealthy business magnate Peter Arrell Browne Widener). His father was also a major figure in Thoroughbred horse racing, being President of Belmont Park racetrack from 1925 to 1939, and builder of the 1932 Hialeah Park racetrack in Miami, Florida.

== Early life ==
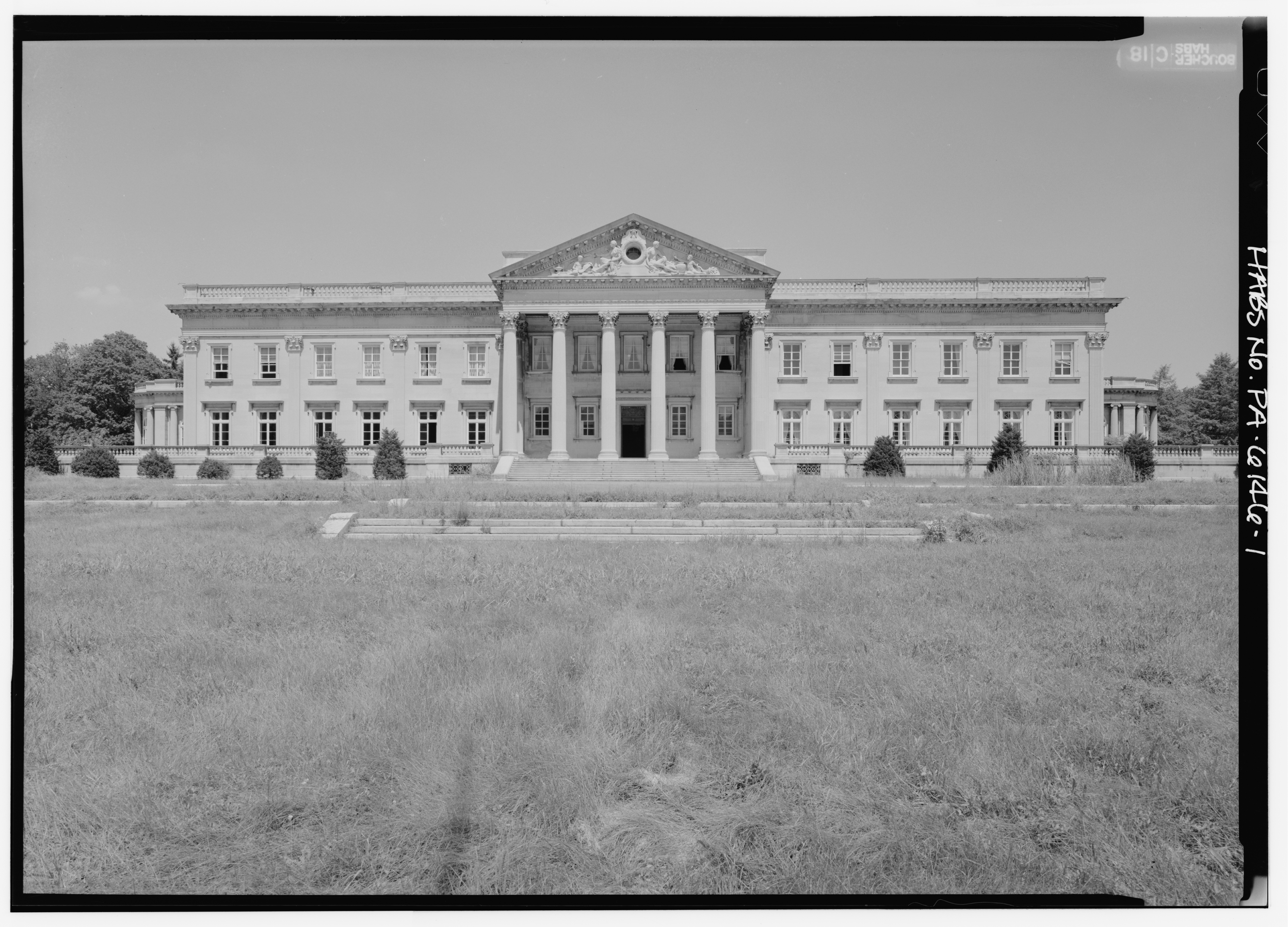
Lynnewood Hall, Elkins Park, Pennsylvania

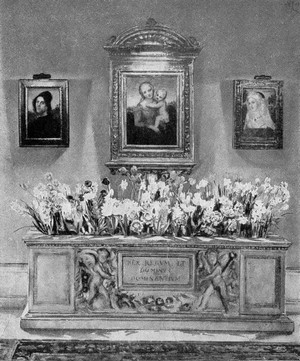
Raphael Room, Lynnewood Hall

He was born in Long Branch, New Jersey, the elder child and only son of Joseph Early Widener (1871–1943) and his wife, Eleanor "Ella" Holmes Pancoast (1874–1929). He grew up in Palm Beach, spending winters at Il Palmetto, the Treanor & Fatio-designed South End landmark built for his parents, and on the Widener family's Lynnewood Hall estate in Elkins Park, Pennsylvania. Designed by Horace Trumbauer (house) and Jacques Greber (gardens), the 110-room Georgian-style mansion, along with its extensive and important art collection, was built by his grandfather, Peter Arrell Browne Widener.

After graduating from private school in Massachusetts in 1915, Widener went to Harvard for a year. While at Newport in July 1916, he made the papers for rescuing a daughter of prominent locals who had gone under in rough surf at Baileys Beach, and he held her in the water for 10 minutes until lifeguards arrived.

In 1917, he went to Washington, D.C., with his father, who persuaded the Surgeon General to admit him to the Army as a Private despite having flat feet and a suspect heart condition, caused by a childhood bout of pneumonia. Widener then served in World War I with the U.S. Expeditionary Forces in France with a medical unit, tending to the wounded and also serving as an interpreter because of his fluency in French. He rose through the ranks to Sergeant and then returned to Elkins Park as 1st Lieutenant in March 1919.

Widener spent the next few years on the Widener family's estate at Lynnewood Hall and began to breed champion German Shepherd dogs. He purchased one dog in Germany for $8,000 and in 1920, he built extensive kennels on the grounds of Lynnewood Hall. Old newspaper clippings contain photographs of the youthful-looking, well-dressed Widener with his dogs. Throughout the 1920s and into the 1930s, his German Shepherds won titles, sometimes several years in a row, at various dog shows all over the East Coast, including the Westminster Kennel Club show in New York. He later branched out to include other breeds, including Dachshunds.

== Thoroughbred horse racing ==
Widener used his great wealth to continue his family's interest in Thoroughbred horse racing on a large scale. Not only did he become an owner of a large stable of racehorses in both the United States and in France, he took over Elmendorf Farm in Lexington, Kentucky, where his father stood Fair Play, his son Chance Shot and the imported stallion Sickle.

The best horse raced by Widener before his death in 1948 was his Elmendorf home-bred Polynesian (b. 1942), a multiple stakes winner (including the 1945 Preakness Stakes), voted 1947 American Champion Sprint Horse, and sire of a U.S. Racing Hall of Fame inductee, Native Dancer (founder of the Raise A Native sire line that includes Mr Prospector, Alydar and Kingmambo). The Wideners' daughter Ella, and her husband Cortright Weatherill, bred Raise a Native.

Widener inherited his father's interests in the Belmont Park racetrack in Elmont, New York, and in Hialeah Park racetrack in Miami, Florida. In 1939, Widener became President of Hialeah Park, famous for its palm trees and the infield flamingos that were imported by Joseph E. Widener from Cuba. After his death, the Widener family's interest in Belmont passed in 1954 to the Greater New York Racing Association. Also in 1954, the interest in Hialeah Park was sold to New Jersey property developer Eugene Mori, who had built the Garden State racetrack in Cherry Hill.

== Marriage and children ==
In November 1924, he married Gertrude Peabody (née Douglas), who had recently divorced from Frederick Peabody. They had two children:

- Peter Arrell Browne Widener III (August 12, 1925 – September 3, 1999)
- Ella Anne Widener-Wetherill (June 14, 1928 – May 6, 1986)

Widener was also the stepfather of a girl who had been adopted by Gertrude during her first marriage to Frederick Peabody:

- Joan Peabody Loudon (c. 1919–1995), the natural daughter of Edward C. Johnson and Alice Brandt

Gertrude Widener (July 8, 1897 – February 3, 1970) was an American socialite who was born in Albany, New York. She was the daughter of a lumber businessman and New York State Senator, Curtis Noble Douglas (1856–1919). Her mother was Nancy Sherman Thomson (1867–1927), whose sister Gertrude Alden Thomson was the wife of the 38th New York Governor, John Alden Dix (1860–1928), who was a partner in another Albany lumber business with the sisters' father, Lemon Thomson. The wedding of Gertrude and Peter Widener took place in the Rembrandt Room at Lynnewood Hall, which housed 14 paintings by Rembrandt, in front of 20 family members and friends. The newlyweds set sail on the Berengaria to spend their honeymoon in Europe.

Known to her friends as "Gertie," Gertrude had married Frederick Peabody, a successful men's clothing manufacturer with whom she adopted a daughter, Joan, the natural daughter of Edward C. Johnson and Alice Brandt. The couple divorced in 1924, and in November of that year, Gertrude married Peter A.B. Widener II. In 1925, Joseph E. Widener had the stables at the Lynnewood Hall estate converted into a home for his son Peter and new daughter-in-law Gertrude. When several members of European royalty visited Lynnewood Hall in person to view the Widener art collection, Peter A.B. II and his wife Gertrude acted as hosts. Beatriz, Infanta of Spain, and Alonzo, brother of the King of Spain, visited in 1928. Other guests included the exiled Grand Duchess Marie of Russia and the Crown Prince and Princess of Sweden. In 1934 the Wideners hosted a reception for the Earl and Countess of Athlone at Il Palmetto in Palm Beach. The Earl of Athlone was the brother of Queen Mary, wife of King George V and mother of future kings Edward VIII and his brother George VI.

== Final years and legacy ==
In 1940, Widener published an autobiography with the title Without Drums. In the book, he described his gilded upbringing, referring to Lynnewood Hall as "a mausoleum". All royalties from the book went to the Ella Pancoast Widener Memorial Fund, which provided medical school scholarships.

On April 20, 1948, Widener died at the age 52 at Lankenau Hospital in Bryn Mawr, Philadelphia, from a rheumatic heart condition. In his will, he left his estate to his family, having created trust funds for his wife and daughter, and leaving his racing farm to his son.

Their son Peter A. B. Widener III attended the University of Kentucky, but he had to stop his studies to take over management of the family's affairs upon the death of his father in 1948. Their daughter Ella Widener and her husband, Cortright Weatherill (1923–1988), owned Happy Hill Farm in Newtown Township, Delaware County, Pennsylvania. They bred the very important sire, Raise a Native.

After her husband's death, Gertrude Widener continued to own, breed and race Thoroughbreds with considerable success both in the United States and in France, often racing under the name Mme P.A.B. Widener. Among the horses trained for her by Etienne Pollet were the classic-winning fillies Hula Dancer and Right Away and Grey Dawn II. By the mid-1950s, Gertrude Widener was living almost full-time in Paris, and she remained there until 1968. At that point, her failing health led to her dispersing her racing stable and returning home to her apartment at the Lowell Hotel on East 63rd Street in New York City, where she died from cancer on February 3, 1970, aged 71. Her remains were returned to Philadelphia for burial in West Laurel Hill Cemetery, next to her second husband.
