= Gertrude T. Widener =

American socialite and racehorse owner (1897–1970)

Gertrude Thompson Douglas Widener
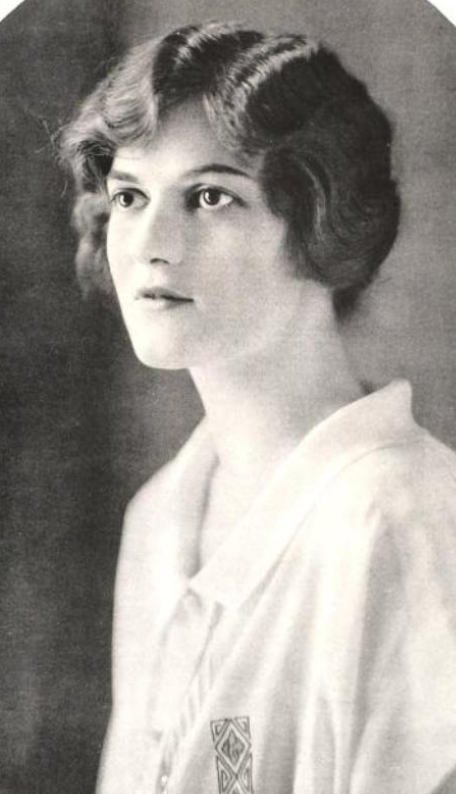
- Gertrude Thompson Douglas Widener, from a 1925 publication
- Born: July 8, 1897; Albany, New York
- Died: February 3, 1970 (aged 72); New York City, New York
- Resting place: West Laurel Hill Cemetery, Philadelphia
- Occupation: Racehorse owner/breeder
- Spouse(s): Frederick G. Peabody (div. 1924); Peter A. B. Widener II (m. 1924)
- Children: With Frederick G. Peabody: Joan Peabody (adopted); With Peter A. B. Widener II: Peter A. B. Widener III; Ella Anne Widener-Weatherill
- Parent(s): Curtis Noble Douglas; Nancy Sherman Thomson
- Relatives: John Alden Dix (uncle)

Gertrude Thompson Widener (née Douglas; July 8, 1897 – February 3, 1970) was an American socialite and a successful Thoroughbred racehorse owner and breeder. Born in Albany, New York, she was the daughter of Curtis N. Douglas, a businessman and New York State senator.

== Life ==
Known to her friends as "Gertie", she was married firstly to Frederick G. Peabody, a successful men's clothing manufacturer. Together, they adopted a girl named Joan (later known as Joan Peabody Loudon), who was the natural daughter of Edward C. Johnson and Alice Brandt.

The couple divorced in 1924, and in November of that year, she remarried to Peter Arrell Browne Widener II, a prominent Philadelphian. He was the elder child and only son of Joseph E. Widener, from a family heavily involved in the sport of Thoroughbred horse racing. In 1925, Joseph Widener had the stables at his Lynnewood Hall estate converted into a home for his son and daughter-in-law.

She and her husband both owned Thoroughbred racehorses, and after his death in 1948, she continued to own, breed and race Thoroughbreds with considerable success both in the United States and in France, where Joseph Widener had maintained a second home and operated a racing stable.

By the mid-1950s, she was living almost full-time in Paris. She remained there until 1968, when her failing health led to her returning home to New York City in 1968, where she died from cancer on February 3, 1970. Her remains were returned to Philadelphia for burial next to her second husband at West Laurel Hill Cemetery.

== Thoroughbred racing ==
Gertrude Widener owned Ampola, who became the foundation mare for her French breeding operation. The principal trainer of her racing stable based in France was Etienne Pollet, who remained with her until she dispersed her stable in 1968. Her filly Hula Dancer won the British Classic 1,000 Guineas Stakes in 1963, and her filly Right Away won the French equivalent (and most important race for three-year-old fillies in France), the Poule d'Essai des Pouliches in 1966.

Her horses twice won the Prix Maurice de Gheest (1963, 1964), Critérium International (1962, 1964), Prix Robert Papin (1957, 1959) and Prix Daphnis (1936, 1967). She also won the Prix Morny three times (1957, 1961, 1964). As of 2009, she still holds the record for most wins in the Prix de Fontainebleau with four (1961, 1962, 1965, 1968), plus the record for most wins in the Prix du Bois with five (1957, 1958, 1961, 1962, 1963).

During her thirty-plus years in racing, she bred or raced four champions:

- Polynesian (b. 1942) - multiple stakes winner, including the 1945 Preakness Stakes. Voted 1947 American Champion Sprint Horse. Sire of U.S. Racing Hall of Fame inductee, Native Dancer.
- Prudent (b. 1959) - wins included the 1961 Prix de la Salamandre, Prix Yacowlef, and Prix Morny. French Champion Two-Year-Old Colt.
- Hula Dancer (b. 1960) - won multiple top races in Europe, including a British Classic in 1963, the 1,000 Guineas Stakes. Sold in 1968 for a European auction record price of 1.02 million French francs.
- Grey Dawn (b. 1962) - wins in France included the most important race for juveniles, the Grand Critérium (1964). Voted French Champion Two-Year-Old Colt, he won in the United States before being retired to stud duty, where he was the leading broodmare sire in North America in 1990.

She notably bred and raced Dan Cupid, sire of Sea Bird, whose 145 Timeform rating is the highest in flat racing history. Her daughter Ella (and husband Cortright Wetherill) owned Happy Hill Farm in Newtown Township, Delaware County, Pennsylvania, and bred Thoroughbreds, including the very important sire, Raise a Native.
