= Never Too Late (horse) =

American-bred Thoroughbred racehorse

- Sire: Never Say Die
- Grandsire: Nasrullah
- Dam: Gloria Nicky
- Damsire: Alycidon
- Sex: Mare
- Foaled: 10 March 1957
- Country: United States
- Colour: Chestnut
- Breeder: Mrs Howell E. Jackson
- Owner: Mrs Howell E. Jackson
- Trainer: Etienne Pollet
- Record: 9: 4-2-0
- Earnings: £40,165

Major wins
- Prix de la Salamandre (1959); Prix Imprudence (1960); 1000 Guineas (1960); Epsom Oaks (1960)

Honours
- Timeform top-rated European two-year-old filly (1959); Timeform rating: 130

Never Too Late (foaled 10 March 1957) was an American-bred, French-trained Thoroughbred racehorse. In a racing career lasting from August 1959 until October 1960, the filly ran nine times and won four races. As a two-year-old she proved herself capable of competing against the leading French colts by winning the Prix de la Salamandre at Longchamp and being narrowly beaten in the Grand Critérium. In the following year she was sent to Britain where she won the 1000 Guineas at Newmarket and Oaks at Epsom. She was then retired to stud at the end of her three-year-old season, and had some success as a broodmare.

== Background ==
Never Too Late was a small chestnut filly bred by her owner Mrs Howell E. (Dorothy) Jackson's Bull Run Stud. Never Too Late's dam, Gloria Nicky was the top-rated British two-year-old filly of 1954, when her wins included the Cheveley Park Stakes. She was a half sister to Libra, a mare who produced the St Leger Stakes winners Ribocco and Ribero. Gloria Nicky was pregnant with her first foal (Never Too Late) when she was sold to Mrs Jackson for £30,000 in 1956. Never Too Late was from the second crop of foals sired by The Derby winner Never Say Die. The filly was sent to be trained in France by Etienne Pollet. When racing in Britain, the filly was known as Never Too Late II.

== Racing career ==
Never Too Late began her racing career in August 1959 when she finished fifth in a maiden race at Deauville-La Touques Racecourse before winning a similar event at Longchamp. In September she was stepped up markedly in class to contest the Prix de la Salamandre. The race at Longchamp was open to both colts and fillies and attracted a field which included the Prix Morny winner Pharamond. Never Too Late won the 1400m event, beating Pharamond into second. A month later, Never Too Late was again matched against colts in the Grand Critérium over 1600m. On this occasion she finished second, beaten a short neck to Angers, a colt who started favourite for the 1961 Epsom Derby.

Never Too Late began her three-year-old season in the Prix Imprudence at Maisons-Laffitte Racecourse, which she won impressively by four lengths from Paola. The filly was then sent to England to contest the 1000 Guineas over Newmarket's Rowley Mile. Ridden by Roger Poincelet she started 8/11 favourite against thirteen opponents. She took the lead a furlong from the finish and won easily by two lengths from Lady In Trouble and Running Blue. Never Too Late returned to Britain a month later and started 6/5 favourite. The finish of the race was rough and controversial. Poincelet held the favourite up towards the back of the field, and struggled to obtain a clear run before making his challenge on the outside in the straight. As she moved up to the French-trained leader Paimpont, Never Too Late hung to the left and blocked the run of a third French filly, Imberline. Never Too Late caught Paimpont in the closing strides and won by a head, with Imberline an apparently unlucky third. After the race, Poincelet alleged that some of the British jockeys had deliberately hampered his progress on three separate occasions, while Etienne Pollet claimed that the filly would have won by six lengths with a clear run.

In September, Never Too Late ran in the Prix Vermeille at Longchamp. Racing on soft ground, she did not reproduce her earlier form and finished unplaced behind Leghinka. On her final appearance, Never Too Late was sent to England for a third time to contest the Champion Stakes at Newmarket. She finished second to the Italian filly Marguerite Vernaut.

== Retirement ==
Never Too Late returned to America to become a broodmare. The best of her offspring was Without Fear, a colt sired by Baldric, who won the Prix Herod and became a leading sire in Australia. Her female-line descendants include Pinker Pinker and the VRC Oaks winner Lovelorn.

== Assessment and honours ==
Never Too Late was given a Timeform rating of 130 in 1959, when she was the highest rated two-year-old filly in Europe. She was rated 128 in 1960.

In their book, A Century of Champions, based on the Timeform rating system, John Randall and Tony Morris rated Never Too Late a "superior" winner of the 1000 Guineas and Oaks.

== Pedigree ==
Pedigree of Never Too Late (USA), chestnut mare, 1957
| Sire Never Say Die (USA) 1951 | Nasrullah; 1940 | Nearco | Pharos |
| Sire Never Say Die (USA) 1951 | Nasrullah; 1940 | Nearco | Nogara |
| Sire Never Say Die (USA) 1951 | Nasrullah; 1940 | Mumtaz Begum | Blenheim |
| Sire Never Say Die (USA) 1951 | Nasrullah; 1940 | Mumtaz Begum | Mumtaz Mahal |
| Sire Never Say Die (USA) 1951 | Singing Grass; 1944 | War Admiral | Man o' War |
| Sire Never Say Die (USA) 1951 | Singing Grass; 1944 | War Admiral | Brushup |
| Sire Never Say Die (USA) 1951 | Singing Grass; 1944 | Boreale | Vatout |
| Sire Never Say Die (USA) 1951 | Singing Grass; 1944 | Boreale | Galaday |
| Dam Gloria Nicky (GB) 1952 | Alycidon; 1945 | Donatello | Blenheim |
| Dam Gloria Nicky (GB) 1952 | Alycidon; 1945 | Donatello | Delleana |
| Dam Gloria Nicky (GB) 1952 | Alycidon; 1945 | Aurora | Hyperion |
| Dam Gloria Nicky (GB) 1952 | Alycidon; 1945 | Aurora | Rose Red |
| Dam Gloria Nicky (GB) 1952 | Weighbridge; 1945 | Portlaw | Beresford |
| Dam Gloria Nicky (GB) 1952 | Weighbridge; 1945 | Portlaw | Portree |
| Dam Gloria Nicky (GB) 1952 | Weighbridge; 1945 | Golden Way | Gold Bridge |
| Dam Gloria Nicky (GB) 1952 | Weighbridge; 1945 | Golden Way | Adria (Family: 4-c) |

Never Too Late was inbred 4x4 to Blenheim, meaning that this stallion appears twice in the fourth generation of her pedigree.
