= Roger Poincelet =

French jockey (1921–1977)

Personal information
- Born: 3 March 1921 Paris, France
- Died: 1 November 1977 (aged 56) Paris, France
- Occupation: Jockey

Horse racing career
- Sport: Horse racing

Major racing wins
- Major French races Prix de l'Arc de Triomphe (1949, 1952, 1964); Prix du Jockey Club (1961) British Classic Races; 1,000 Guineas (1960, 1963); 2,000 Guineas (1952); Epsom Derby (1961); Epsom Oaks (1960) Other major races Ascot Gold Cup (1951); Champion Stakes (1955); King George VI and Queen Elizabeth Stakes (1955, 1961)

Significant horses
- Coronation, Hafiz, Hula Dancer, Never Too Late, Pan, Prince Royal, Psidium, Right Royal, Thunderhead, Vimy

Roger Poincelet (3 March 1921 – 1 November 1977) was a French jockey who rode a total of over 3,000 winners in a long career on both the flat and, initially, jumps. He is regarded as one of the finest French jockeys ever.

His first win came on Prince Aly Khan's Manchuria on 17 May 1937. In his home country, he won three Prix de l'Arc de Triomphes – on Coronation in 1949, Nuccio in 1952 and, lastly, on Prince Royal in 1964. He also went on to win five British classics – the 2,000 Guineas on Thunderhead in 1952, the 1,000 Guineas and Oaks on Never Too Late in 1960, the 1,000 Guineas again on Hula Dancer in 1963 and, most notably, the Derby on the rank outsider, Psidium in 1961.

Psidium had been the less-favoured of two horses from the same stable. Poincelet kept Psidium at the back of the field until reaching Tattenham Corner. He then brought the horse on a path along the outside of the field to win the race. In doing so, Psidium became the longest priced Derby winner for 48 years. Sovrango, the stable's number one horse, finished fourth.

After he retired from race riding, Poincelet began training horses in 1971.

He died in a Paris hospital on Tuesday, 1 November 1977, aged 57, after a long illness.

== Major wins ==
(United Kingdom) Great Britain

- 1,000 Guineas Stakes – (2) – Never Too Late (1960), Hula Dancer (1963)
- 2,000 Guineas Stakes – Thunderhead (1952)
- Ascot Gold Cup – Pan (1951)
- Champion Stakes – Hafiz (1955)
- Epsom Derby – Psidium (1961)
- Epsom Oaks – Never Too Late (1960)
- King George VI and Queen Elizabeth Stakes – (2) – Vimy (1955), Right Royal (1961)

France

- Prix de l'Arc de Triomphe – (3) – Coronation (1949), Nuccio (1952), Prince Royal (1964)
- Prix du Jockey Club – Right Royal (1961)
