= Raise a Native =

American-bred Thoroughbred racehorse

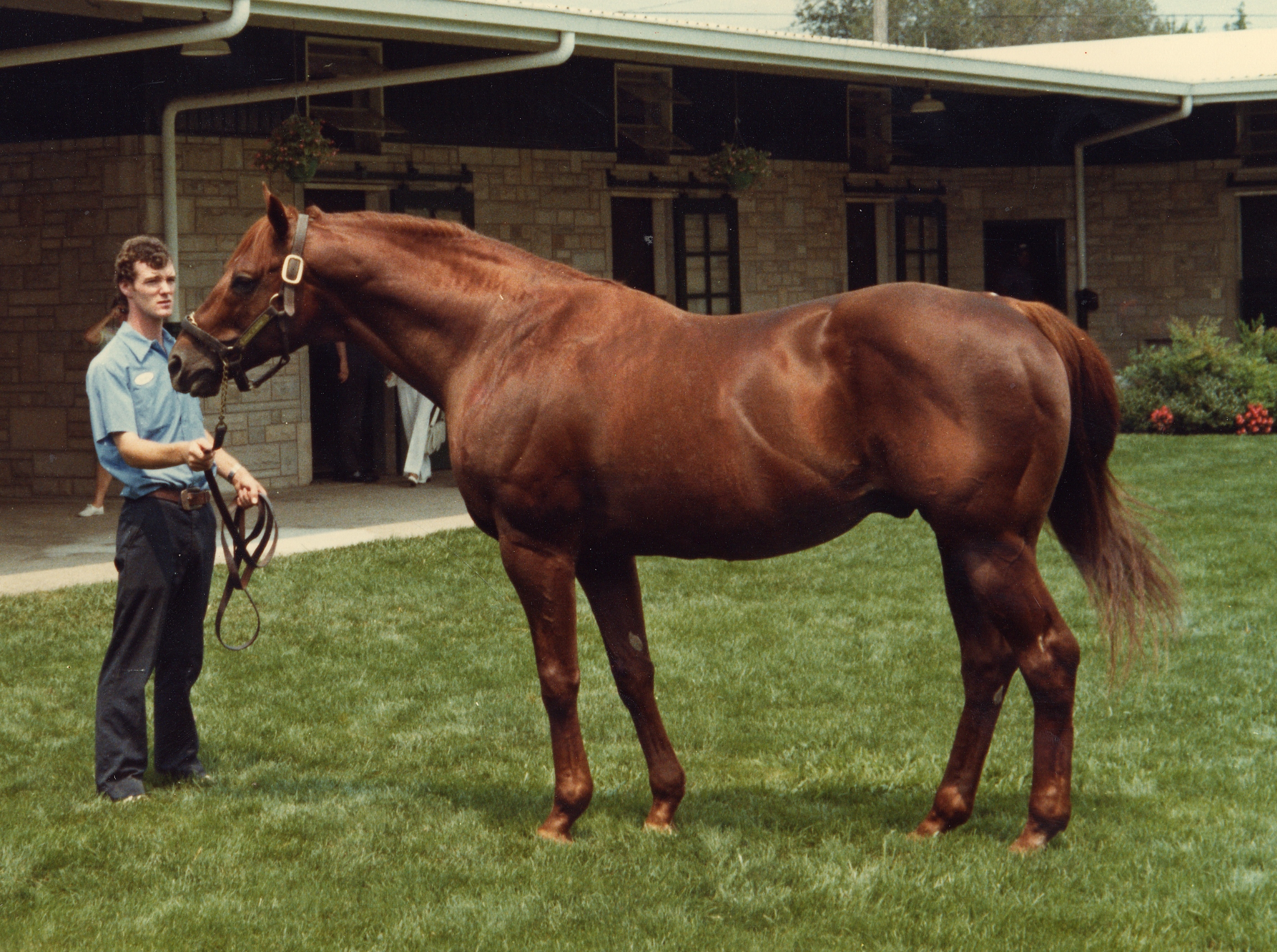
- Raise a Native at Spendthrift Farm in 1981
- Sire: Native Dancer
- Grandsire: Polynesian
- Dam: Raise You
- Damsire: Case Ace
- Sex: Stallion
- Foaled: April 18, 1961
- Died: July 28, 1988 (aged 27)
- Country: United States
- Colour: Chestnut
- Breeder: Happy Hill Farm
- Owner: Mrs. E. H. Augustus; Louis Wolfson
- Trainer: Burley Parke
- Record: 4: 4–0–0
- Earnings: $45,955

Major wins
- Great American Stakes (1963); Juvenile Stakes (1963)

Awards
- TSD American Champion Two-Year-Old Colt (1963)
- Last updated on July 17, 2007

Raise a Native (April 18, 1961 – July 28, 1988) was an undefeated Thoroughbred racehorse that was named 1963 champion two-year-old colt in the Turf and Sport Digest poll and was the highest rated juvenile in the Experimental Free Handicap. He sired 74 stakes winners, including Majestic Prince and Alydar. In its 1988 obituary for the horse, The New York Times called him "the most influential sire of American Thoroughbred stallions over the last 20 years".

== Breeding ==
Raise a Native was bred by Happy Hill Farm, owned by Cortright Wetherill (1923–1988) and his wife Ella Anne Widener (1928–1986), whose Widener family of Philadelphia is one of the most prominent in American Thoroughbred racing history. Raise a Native was by the 1954 United States Horse of the Year Native Dancer, who was ranked #7 by the Blood-Horse magazine listing of the top 100 U.S. Thoroughbred champions of the 20th Century. His dam was the good stakes winner Raise You, by Case Ace. Raise a Native was sold as a weanling to Mrs. E. H. Augustus for a record sum of $22,000 ($240,000 inflation adjusted). He was later bought by Louis Wolfson as a yearling in 1962 for $39,000 ($420,000 inflation adjusted) and moved to Wolfson's Harbor View Farm in 1963.

== Racing record ==
Trained by future Hall of Fame inductee Burley Parke, as a two-year-old Raise a Native was undefeated in four starts and set or equaled track records three times. He won the sprint races the Great American Stakes and the Belmont Juvenile and was voted American Champion Two-Year-Old Colt by Turf & Sports Digest. The rival Daily Racing Form and Thoroughbred Racing Association polls were topped by Hurry to Market.

== Stud record ==
After ending his racing career due to a bowed tendon in 1963, Raise a Native was bought by Spendthrift Farm, a breeding syndicate in Lexington, Kentucky. Although the descendants of Raise a Native have had success racing on turf in Europe, they generally have been more attuned to running on dirt.

Among his offspring, he sired Alydar (who was a close second to Affirmed in all three Triple Crown races), Crowned Prince (who won the Dewhurst Stakes), Exclusive Native (who won the Arlington Classic), Mr. Prospector (who is a leading sire), and Majestic Prince (who won the Kentucky Derby and Preakness Stakes).

He is notably the grandsire of Triple Crown winner Affirmed, Kentucky Derby winning filly Genuine Risk, Kentucky Derby and Preakness Stakes winner Alysheba, Queen's Plate winning filly Dancethruthedawn, Belmont Stakes winner Easy Goer, Breeders' Cup Sprint winner Gulch, Kentucky Derby winner Fusaichi Pegasus, Belmont Stakes winner Coastal, undefeated Meadowlake, Belmont Stakes winner Conquistador Cielo, Horse of the Year Criminal Type, Kentucky Derby winner Strike the Gold, and Grade 1 winner Smart Strike.

Raise a Native is also the great-great-grandsire of two champions. The first is two-time Horse of the Year Curlin, who won the 2007 Preakness Stakes and Breeders Cup Classic and 2008 Dubai World Cup, and the second is champion mare Zenyatta, winner of the 2008 Breeders' Cup Ladies Classic and 2009 Breeders' Cup Classic. He is also the great-great-grandsire of 2008 Breeders' Cup Classic winner Raven's Pass.

As of 2026, 24 Kentucky Derby winners are direct descendants of the Raise a Native sire line: Mage, Rich Strike, Country House, American Pharoah, Always Dreaming, I'll Have Another, Super Saver, Street Sense, Smarty Jones, Funny Cide, War Emblem, Monarchos, Mine That Bird, Fusaichi Pegasus, Real Quiet, Grindstone, Golden Tempo, Thunder Gulch, Strike the Gold, Unbridled, Alysheba, Genuine Risk, Affirmed, and Majestic Prince. Seven Kentucky Derby winners are out of mares which are also direct descendants of the Raise a Native sire line: Barbaro, Orb, California Chrome, Authentic, Mandaloun, Rich Strike and Mine that Bird, the latter two carrying him in both paternal and maternal sire lines. The 2018 Triple Crown winner, Justify, carries 4 crosses of Raise a Native in his pedigree (6x4x7x6) whilst Nyquist, the 2016 Kentucky Derby winner, is related through his grand-dam Seeking Regina, a great-granddaughter of Raise a Native.

On July 28, 1988, Raise a Native was humanely euthanized at Spendthrift Farm due to spinal deterioration.

== Pedigree ==
Pedigree of Raise A Native (USA), chestnut stallion, 1961
Sire Native Dancer 1950	Polynesian; 1942	Unbreakable	Sickle
Sire Native Dancer 1950	Polynesian; 1942	Unbreakable	Blue Glass
Sire Native Dancer 1950	Polynesian; 1942	Black Polly	Polymelian
Sire Native Dancer 1950	Polynesian; 1942	Black Polly	Black Queen
Sire Native Dancer 1950	Geisha; 1943	Discovery	Display
Sire Native Dancer 1950	Geisha; 1943	Discovery	Ariadne
Sire Native Dancer 1950	Geisha; 1943	Miyako	John P. Grier
Sire Native Dancer 1950	Geisha; 1943	Miyako	La Chica
Dam Raise You 1946	Case Ace; 1934	Teddy	Ajax
Dam Raise You 1946	Case Ace; 1934	Teddy	Rondeau
Dam Raise You 1946	Case Ace; 1934	Sweetheart	Ultimus
Dam Raise You 1946	Case Ace; 1934	Sweetheart	Humanity
Dam Raise You 1946	Lady Glory; 1934	American Flag	Man o' War
Dam Raise You 1946	Lady Glory; 1934	American Flag	Lady Comfey
Dam Raise You 1946	Lady Glory; 1934	Beloved	Whisk Broom
Dam Raise You 1946	Lady Glory; 1934	Beloved	Bill and Coo (Family: 8-f)

== See also ==
- List of leading Thoroughbred racehorses
