= Hurryoff =

American-bred Thoroughbred racehorse

- Sire: Haste
- Grandsire: Maintenant
- Dam: Blue Glass
- Damsire: Prince Palatine
- Sex: Stallion
- Foaled: 1930
- Country: United States
- Colour: Black
- Breeder: Joseph E. Widener
- Owner: Joseph E. Widener
- Trainer: Henry McDaniel
- Record: 7: 3-0-3
- Earnings: US$

Major wins
- American Classic Race wins: Belmont Stakes (1933)

Hurryoff (foaled 1930 in Kentucky) was an American Thoroughbred racehorse best known for winning the third leg of the 1933 U.S. Triple Crown series. He was bred and raced by Joseph Widener, owner of the prestigious Elmendorf Farm in Lexington, Kentucky and president of Belmont Park and Hialeah Park racetracks. Hurryoff was sired by Withers Stakes winner, Haste. He was out of the mare Blue Glass, who was also the dam of Unbreakable who sired Polynesian. Hurryoff's damsire was the outstanding British runner, Prince Palatine who had stood at Edward F. Simms' Xalapa Farm in Kentucky.

Racing at age three, Hurryoff was entered in the Belmont Stakes, the third leg of the U.S. Triple Crown series. Lightly regarded, in his last race Hurryoff had gone unclaimed for $4,000. Although neither Kentucky Derby winner Brokers Tip, nor the Preakness Stakes victor, Head Play, was entered in the mile and a half Belmont Stakes, Hurryoff was still a 12:1 longshot when he won the richest race of the year for three-year-olds.

The Belmont would be Hurryoff's only significant race win of his limited career and his last start. For more than a decade owner Joseph Widener had been donating stallions to the Breeding Bureau of the Jockey Club including Hurryoff's grandsire, Maintenant. The Great Depression affected all aspects of horse racing and in 1933 yearling prices fell to record lows, and in August 1934 Widener gifted Hurryoff to the Remount Association and the Breeding Bureau.
