= Thunderhead (horse) =

Thoroughbred racehorse

- Sire: Merry Boy
- Grandsire: Asterus
- Dam: Herodiade
- Damsire: Tourbillon
- Sex: Stallion
- Foaled: 1949
- Country: France
- Colour: Chestnut
- Breeder: Jean Desbons
- Owner: Eugène Constant
- Trainer: Etienne Pollet
- Record: 6:3-2-0 (incomplete)

Major wins
- Prix de Fontainebleau (1952); 2000 Guineas (1952)

Awards
- Timeform rating 133d

Thunderhead (foaled 1949) was a French Thoroughbred racehorse and sire, best known for winning the classic 2000 Guineas in 1952. He won once as a two-year-old and showed improved form in the spring of 1952, winning the Prix de Fontainebleau before recording an emphatic win over twenty-five opponents in the 2000 Guineas. He then finished second when favourite for the Poule d'Essai des Poulains and ran poorly when strongly-fancied for The Derby. He was later exported to South Africa where he had some success as a breeding stallion.

When racing in Britain he was known as Thunderhead II.

== Background ==
Thunderhead was a chestnut horse, "built more as a sprinter than a stayer" with a small white star, bred in France by Jean Desbons. He was probably the best horse sired by Merry Boy who finished second in the Prix Eugène Adam in 1941. His dam Herodiade was a great-granddaughter of the broodmare Gondolette, whose other descendants included Hyperion, Sansovino and Big Game. As a yearling, the colt was bought by Eugène Constant and sent into training with Etienne Pollet.

Alan Bell, the chairman of the Victoria Racing Club, who viewed Thunderhead in the spring of 1952 said "the colt is a fine, strongly built individual, big bodied but splendidly boned to carry his big frame, with powerful hocks and gaskins, and with a beautiful shoulder and character written all over him. Seldom have I seen a thoroughbred I liked better".

== Racing career ==
=== 1951: two-year-old season ===
After finishing second on his racecourse debut, Thunderhead won a race over 1200 metres at Saint-Cloud Racecourse in the late autumn of 1951.

=== 1952: three-year-old season ===
On his first appearance as a three-year-old, Thunderhead was moved up in distance and won the Prix de Fontainebleau over 1600 metres at Longchamp Racecourse. It was the first running of the race in its modern form: it had previously been run over 2200 metres before being discontinued in 1948.

The colt was then sent to England to contest the 144th running of the 2000 Guineas over the Rowley mile at Newmarket Racecourse on 30 April. Ridden by Roger Poincelet he started at odds of 100/7 in a twenty-six runner field. The field split into two groups on the wide, straight course, with Poincelet positioning Thunderhead behind the leaders on the stands-side (the left side of the course from the jockeys' viewpoint). He took the lead in the last quarter mile and won very easily by five lengths from Kings Bench (who raced in the far-side group) with Argur half a length away in third place. Three weeks later, the colt attempted to win the French equivalent of the 2000 Guineas, the Poule d'Essai des Poulains over 1600 metres at Longchamp. He started the 1.7/1 favourite but was beaten two lengths into second place by Guy de Rothschild's Guersant. Despite the colt's defeat, Pollet announced that he would definitely run in The Derby.

As predicted, Thunderhead returned to Britain for the 173rd running of the Derby on 28 May. Ridden by the Australian jockey Ted Fordyce, he was among the favourites but finished unplaced behind Tulyar. Thunderhead failed to recover his earlier form and never won again.

== Assessment ==
The independent Timeform organisation awarded Thunderhead a rating of 133d in 1952. The rating placed him equal second behind Tulyar among the European racehorses of that year, but the "d" indicated that his form had deteriorated.

In their book A Century of Champions, based on a modified version of the Timeform system, John Randall and Tony Morris rated Thunderhead an "inferior" winner of the 2000 Guineas.

== Stud record ==
At the end of his racing career, Thunderhead was sold and exported to stand as a breeding stallion in South Africa. He sired the Cape Derby winner Famous Five and the Johannesburg Summer Handicap winner Merciless Sun.

== Pedigree ==
Pedigree of Thunderhead (FR), chestnut stallion, 1949
Sire Merry Boy (FR) 1938	Asterus (FR); 1923	Teddy	Ajax
Sire Merry Boy (FR) 1938	Asterus (FR); 1923	Teddy	Rondeau
Sire Merry Boy (FR) 1938	Asterus (FR); 1923	Astrella	Verdun
Sire Merry Boy (FR) 1938	Asterus (FR); 1923	Astrella	Saint Astra
Sire Merry Boy (FR) 1938	Mericyl (FR); 1929	Cylgad	Cyllene
Sire Merry Boy (FR) 1938	Mericyl (FR); 1929	Cylgad	Gadfly
Sire Merry Boy (FR) 1938	Mericyl (FR); 1929	Meriem	La Farina
Sire Merry Boy (FR) 1938	Mericyl (FR); 1929	Meriem	Elfina
Dam Herodiade (FR) 1943	Tourbillon (FR); 1928	Ksar	Bruleur
Dam Herodiade (FR) 1943	Tourbillon (FR); 1928	Ksar	Kizil Kourgan
Dam Herodiade (FR) 1943	Tourbillon (FR); 1928	Durban	Durbar
Dam Herodiade (FR) 1943	Tourbillon (FR); 1928	Durban	Banshee
Dam Herodiade (FR) 1943	Harbour Light (FR); 1937	Pharos	Phalaris
Dam Herodiade (FR) 1943	Harbour Light (FR); 1937	Pharos	Scapa Flow
Dam Herodiade (FR) 1943	Harbour Light (FR); 1937	Piazzetta	Stedfast
Dam Herodiade (FR) 1943	Harbour Light (FR); 1937	Piazzetta	Gondolette (Family 6-e)
