= Unbreakable (horse) =

American-bred Thoroughbred racehorse

- Sire: Sickle
- Grandsire: Phalaris
- Dam: Blue Glass
- Damsire: Prince Palatine
- Sex: Stallion
- Foaled: 1935
- Country: United States
- Colour: Black
- Breeder: Joseph E. Widener
- Owner: Joseph E. Widener
- Trainer: Cecil Boyd-Rochfort
- Record: 14: 5-3-2

Major wins
- Richmond Stakes (1937); Victoria Cup (1938)

Unbreakable (1935–1952) was an American-bred, British-trained Thoroughbred racehorse and sire. He was successful on the racecourse, but some way below the best of his generation. His best wins came in the Richmond Stakes at Goodwood as a two-year-old and in the Victoria Cup Handicap two years later. After his retirement from racing he became a highly successful breeding stallion: through his grandson Native Dancer he appears in the pedigrees of most modern Thoroughbreds.

== Background ==
Unbreakable was a black horse bred in the United States by his owner, Joseph E. Widener. He was sent to race in England, where he was trained by Cecil Boyd-Rochfort. The colt was sired by the British-bred stallion Sickle out of the French mare Blue Glass, making him a half-brother to the Belmont Stakes winner Hurryoff.

== Racing career ==
As a two-year-old, Unbreakable won three races including the Richmond Stakes at Goodwood in July. In the following year he competed at the highest level, finishing fifth to Pasch in the 2000 Guineas and eighth behind Bois Roussel in The Derby.

== Stud record ==
Unbreakable sired the Preakness Stakes winner Polynesian who in turn sired Native Dancer. One of the most highly rated American horses of the 20th century, Native Dancer was the grandsire of Mr. Prospector and the damsire of Northern Dancer. Unbreakable Died in 1952.

== Pedigree ==
Pedigree of Unbreakable, black stallion, 1935
Sire Sickle brown 1924	Phalaris br. 1913	Polymelus b. 1902	Cyllene
Sire Sickle brown 1924	Phalaris br. 1913	Polymelus b. 1902	Maid Marian
Sire Sickle brown 1924	Phalaris br. 1913	Bromus b. 1905	Sainfoin
Sire Sickle brown 1924	Phalaris br. 1913	Bromus b. 1905	Cheery
Sire Sickle brown 1924	Selene b. 1919	Chaucer br. 1900	St. Simon
Sire Sickle brown 1924	Selene b. 1919	Chaucer br. 1900	Canterbury Pilgrim
Sire Sickle brown 1924	Selene b. 1919	Serenissima b. 1913	Minoru
Sire Sickle brown 1924	Selene b. 1919	Serenissima b. 1913	Gondolette
Dam Blue Glass brown 1917	Prince Palatine b. 1908	Persimmon b. 1893	St. Simon
Dam Blue Glass brown 1917	Prince Palatine b. 1908	Persimmon b. 1893	Perdita
Dam Blue Glass brown 1917	Prince Palatine b. 1908	Lady Lightfoot b. 1900	Isinglass
Dam Blue Glass brown 1917	Prince Palatine b. 1908	Lady Lightfoot b. 1900	Glare
Dam Blue Glass brown 1917	Hour Glass blk. 1909	Rock Sand br. 1900	Sainfoin
Dam Blue Glass brown 1917	Hour Glass blk. 1909	Rock Sand br. 1900	Roquebrune
Dam Blue Glass brown 1917	Hour Glass blk. 1909	Hautesse II br. 1891	Archiduc
Dam Blue Glass brown 1917	Hour Glass blk. 1909	Hautesse II br. 1891	Hauteur (Family 4-i)

Unbreakable is inbred 4 × 4 to Sainfoin and St. Simon, meaning those stallions appear twice in the fourth generation of his pedigree.

== See also ==
- List of racehorses
