= Widener family =

American family founded by Peter A. B. Widener

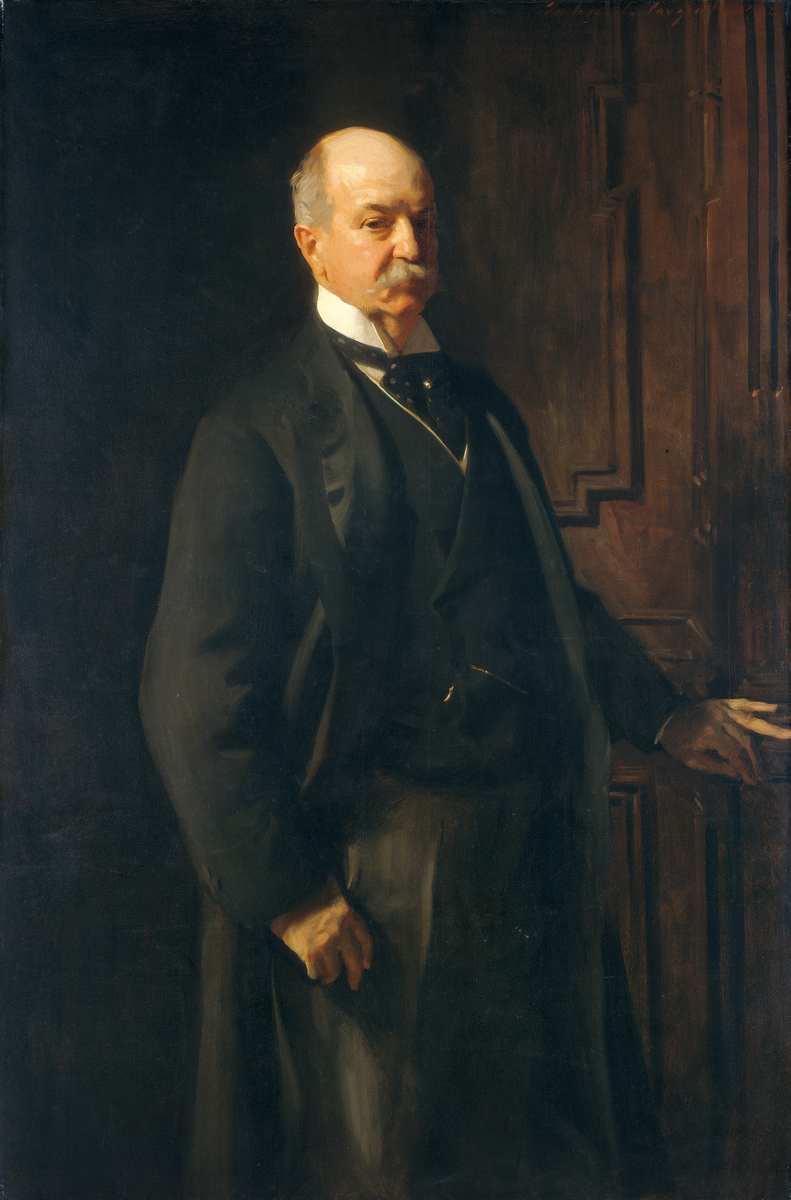
Portrait of Peter A. B. Widener, a 1902 portrait of Peter Arrell Browne Widener by John Singer Sargent

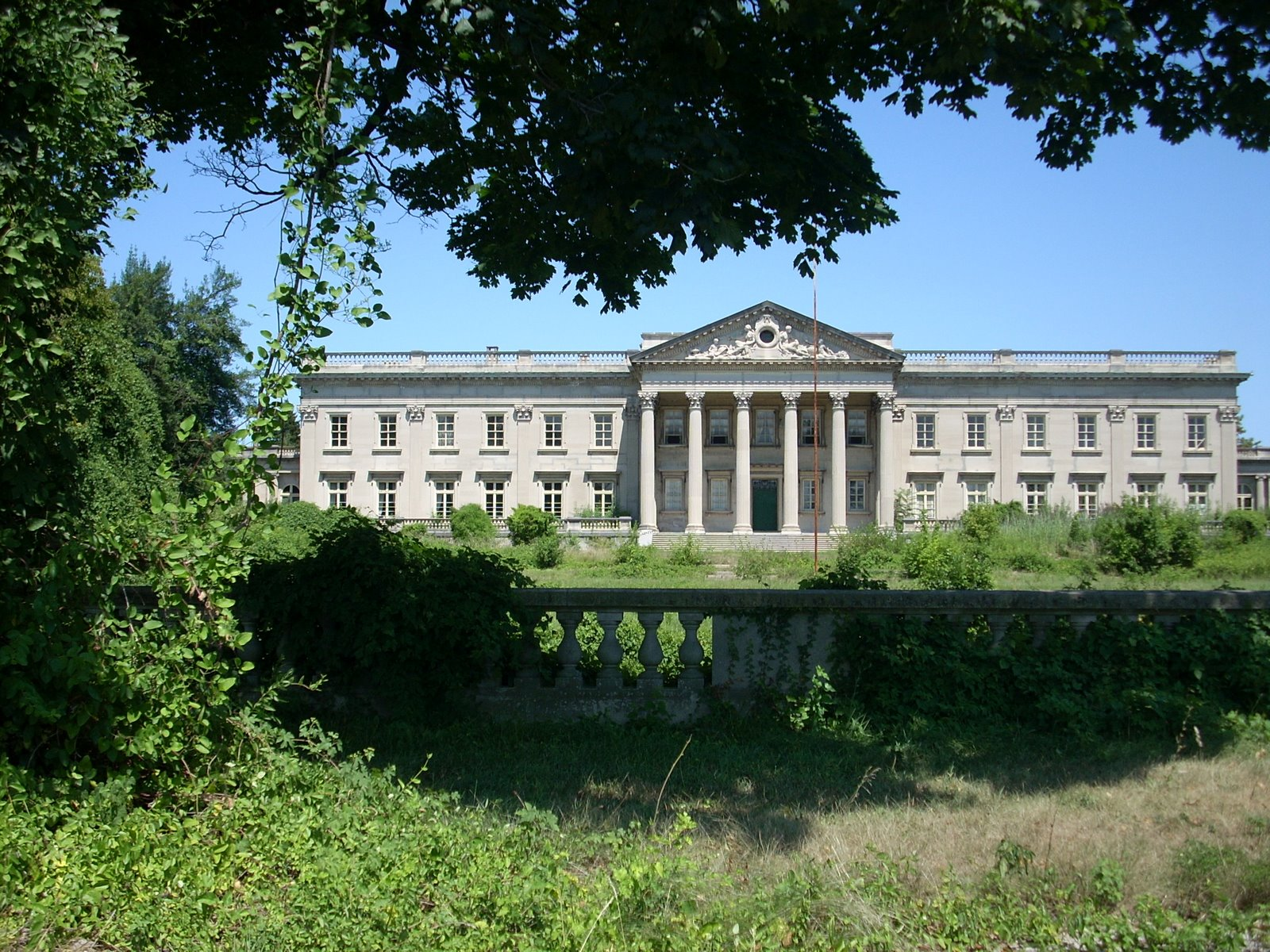
Lynnewood Hall in 2007

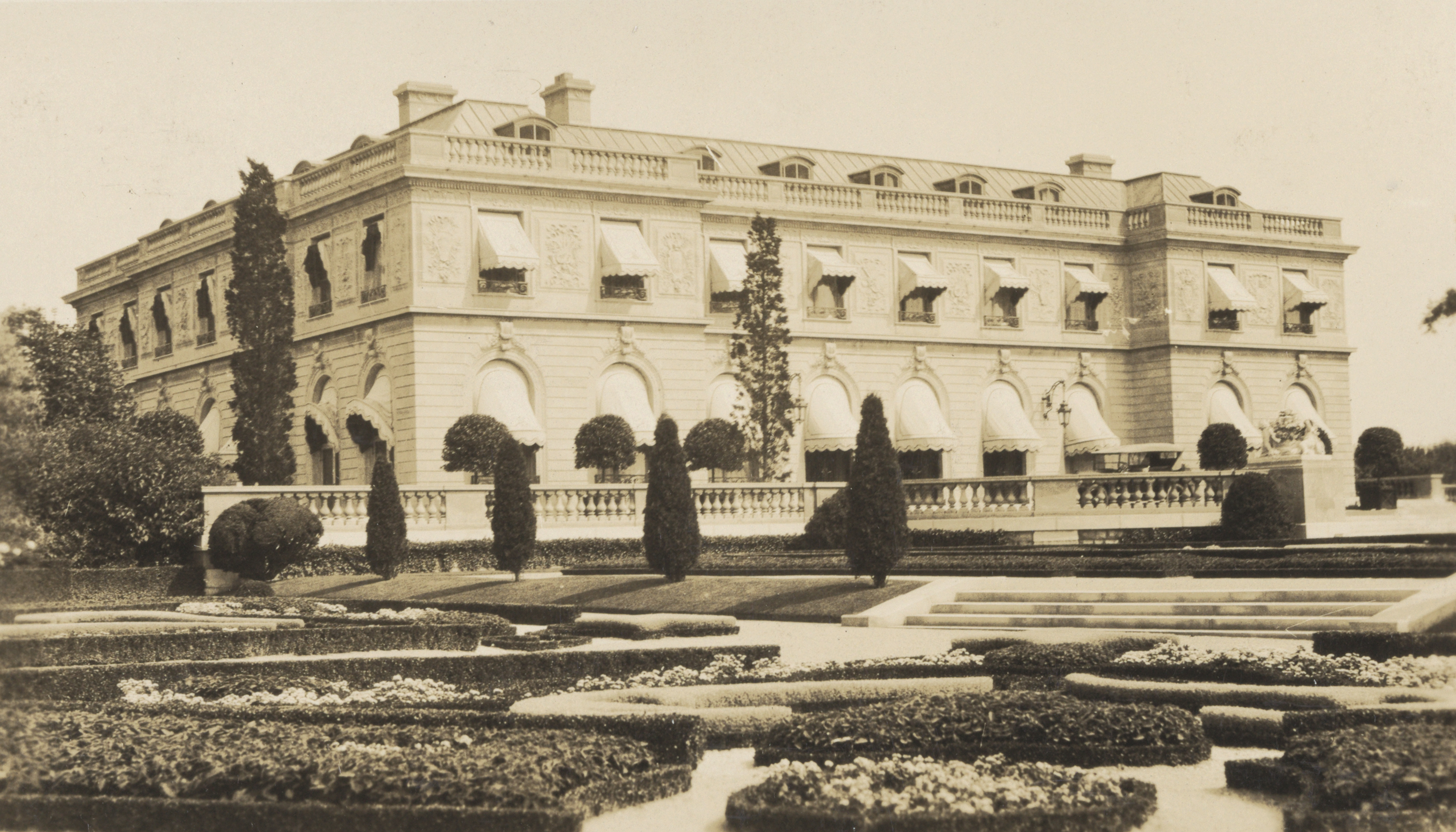
The Miramar mansion

The Widener family is an American family from Philadelphia, Pennsylvania.

Founded by Peter Arrell Browne Widener (1834–1915) and his wife, Hannah Josephine Dunton (1836–1896), it was once one of the wealthiest families in the United States. Widener was ranked #29 on the American Heritage list of the forty richest Americans in history, with a net worth at death of $23 billion to $25 billion. In 1883, Peter Widener was part of the founding partnership of the Philadelphia Traction Company, and he used the great wealth accumulated from that business to become a founding organizer of U.S. Steel and the American Tobacco Company.

== Family tree ==
- Peter Arrell Browne Widener (1834–1915), married Hannah Josephine Dunton (1836–1896)
  - (son) Harry Widener (1859–1874), died unmarried and without issue
  - (son) George Dunton Widener (1861–1912), married Eleanor Elkins (1862–1937), began construction of Miramar, died aboard the RMS Titanic
    - (grandson) Harry Elkins Widener (1885–1912), died aboard the RMS Titanic, died unmarried and without issue
    - (grandson) George D. Widener Jr. (1889–1971), married Jessie Sloane Dodge (1883–1968), purchased Erdenheim Farm, died without issue
    - (granddaughter) Eleanor Widener Dixon (1891–1966), married banker Fitz Eugene Dixon (1888–1982), built Ronaele Manor
      - (great-granddaughter) Eleanor Widener Dixon (1913–1967), married James Cuthbert Gentle (1904–1986), died without issue
      - (great-grandson) Fitz Eugene Dixon Jr. (1923–2006), married Edith Bruen Robb (born 1925), inherited Erdenheim Farm
        - (great-great-grandson) George Widener Dixon (born 1953)
        - (great-great-granddaughter) Edith Eleanor Dixon (born 1957), married Donald P. Rosendale
  - (son) Joseph Early Widener (1871–1943), married Eleanor Holmes Pancoast (1873–1929)
    - (grandson) Peter Arrell Browne Widener II (1895–1948), married Gertrude Douglas Peabody (1897–1970)
      - (great-grandson) Peter Arrell Browne Widener III (1925–1999), married Louise B. Van Meter (1928–2018)
        - (great-great-grandson) Peter Arrell Browne Widener IV (born 1950)
        - (great-great-grandson) George D. Widener (born 1954)
      - (great-granddaughter) Ella Ann Widener (1928–1986), married Cortright Wetherill (1923–1988)
        - (great-great-grandson) Cortright Wetherill Jr. (born 1951), married Janice Nestle, 2 Children, Amanda Widener Wetherill, Cortright Wetherill III, married Elizabeth Hamlin (2023)
        - (great-great-grandson) Peter Widener Wetherill (died 2010), died unmarried and without issue
    - (granddaughter) Josephine "Fifi" Widener Leidy Holden Wichfeld Bigelow (1902–1961)
      - (great-granddaughter) Joan Widener Leidy Paine Ray (1923–1988), 1st married George Eustis Paine Jr. (divorce 1950), 2nd married James Chandler Ray (1923–2017)
        - (great-great-grandson) George Eustis Paine III (1942–2001), 1st married Dianne Marie Barton (m. 1965, divorce 1974), 1 child Eustis Barton Paine (born 1969), 2 children Samuel Eustis Paine (born 2006), Nathan Michel Paine (born 2006)
        - (great-great-granddaughter) Leidy Simpson
        - (great-great-grandson) James Widener Ray (1952–2005), died without issue
        - (great-great-granddaughter) Joan Chandler Ray (1955–2009), 1 child Tyrone Cagney Ray (born 1983)

=== Other notable Widener relatives ===
- George Widener (1820–1901), Peter Arrell Browne Widener's eldest brother. Served as a member of the Philadelphia City Council representing the city's 20th ward.

== Legacy ==
The legacy of Peter and Hannah Widener includes the Widener Library at Harvard University, but even more important was the implanting of a social conscience in their children that has been passed down from generation to generation. While the family fortune dwindled over time through natural division and redivision by inheritors, many of their 21st-century descendants continue to be involved in charitable works. Widener University in Chester, Pennsylvania, was named after the Wideners as a result of a very large contribution the family made when the college was transitioning from an all-male military college to a co-educational civilian university.

Peter and Hannah Widener built Lynnewood Hall in Elkins Park, Pennsylvania, a 110-room Georgian-style mansion designed by Horace Trumbauer, where they assembled one of the most valuable art collections in the country. Left a vast fortune, their offspring became among the most prominent factors in American Thoroughbred horse racing history, as well as founding benefactors of the National Gallery of Art in Washington, D.C., Widener University in Chester, Pennsylvania, and the Widener School for Crippled Children.

== See also ==
- New Bolton Center at Widener Hospital
- Elmendorf Farm
- Happy Hill Farm
- Belmont Park
- Hialeah Park Race Track
- Cotillion Handicap
- Widener Handicap
- National Museum of Racing and Hall of Fame
- Tyler School of Art
