= Hafiz (horse) =

French-bred Thoroughbred racehorse

- Aga Khan III's racing colours
- Sire: Nearco
- Grandsire: Pharos
- Dam: Double Rose
- Damsire: Macaron
- Sex: Stallion
- Foaled: 1952
- Country: France
- Colour: Chestnut
- Breeder: Aga Khan III & Prince Aly Khan
- Owner: Aga Khan III; Larry MacPhail
- Trainer: Alec Head
- Record: 13:6-3-0

Major wins
- Prix de Guiche (1955); Prix Greffulhe (1955); Queen Elizabeth II Stakes (1955); Champion Stakes (1955)

Awards
- Timeform rating 136

Hafiz (1952 – 1971) was a French Thoroughbred racehorse and sire. In a racing career which lasted from 1954 until 1956 he ran at least thirteen times and won six races. As a three-year-old in 1955 he won the Prix de Guiche and the Prix Greffulhe in France before winning the Queen Elizabeth II Stakes and Champion Stakes in Britain. He was disappointing for most of the following season but produced what was arguably his best performance when finishing second under top weight in the Cambridgeshire Handicap. He made no impact at stud.

When racing in Britain and later while standing as a stallion in the United States, the horse was known as Hafiz II.

== Background ==
Hafiz was a big, powerful chestnut horse with four white feet bred in France by the Aga Khan in partnership with his son Prince Aly Khan. During the early part of his racing career he was owned by the Aga Khan and trained at Chantilly by Alec Head. Hafiz was a difficult horse to manage, with a nervous, excitable disposition, and often sweated heavily before the start of his races.

He was sired by Nearco, an undefeated Italian champion who went on to become one of the most important sires of the 20th century. His dam, Double Rose, was a top class racemare who finished second in the 1949 Prix de l'Arc de Triomphe in the colours of Aly Khan's wife, Rita Hayworth.

== Racing career ==
=== 1954: two-year-old season ===
Hafiz was not highly tried as a two-year-old. He finished second in the Prix de Saint-Firmin over 1000 metres at Longchamp Racecourse and then won a minor race at Maisons-Laffitte. At the end of the season a half share in the colt was sold to the American breeder Larry MacPhail.

=== 1955: three-year-old season ===
In the spring of 1955, Hafiz established himself as one of the leading French colts with wins in two important trial races at Longchamp: the Prix Greffulhe over 2000 metres and the Prix de Guiche over 1950 metres. In June he was sent to Britain to contest the Derby over one and a half miles at Epsom but despite being considered a serious contender he finished unplaced behind another French challenger Phil Drake.

Hafiz returned to Britain in autumn and recorded his two most important victories. In September he appeared at Ascot where he produced a "great finishing sprint" to win the inaugural running of the Queen Elizabeth II Stakes over one mile. In the following month he started at odds of 100/30 for the Champion Stakes over one and a quarter miles at Newmarket Racecourse. Ridden by Roger Poincelet he won from the 1954 2000 Guineas winner Darius and the Irish Derby winner Panaslipper.

=== 1956: four-year-old season ===
Before the start of the new season, MacPhail bought out the remaining half-share in the colt for £70,000. Hafiz did not win any major events in 1956 (his only success was in the Prix d'Automne) but he enhanced his reputation in two of his defeats. After running poorly in the Prix Ganay he finished second in the Hardwicke Stakes at Royal Ascot, beaten 1 1/2 lengths when attempting to concede six pounds to the leading British four-year-old Hugh Lupus. Following unplaced runs in the Eclipse Stakes (for which he started favourite) and the Queen Elizabeth II Stakes his connections took the unusual decision to end the season with a run in the Cambridgeshire Handicap over nine furlongs at Newmarket. Although the race had been won by many champions in the past, by the 1950s it had become common practice for top-class European horses to compete almost exclusively in weight-for-age events. Carrying top weight of 133 pounds, Hafiz was ridden by the Australian jockey Rae Johnstone and started at odds of 10/1. In what Alec Head described as a "wonderful performance" Hafiz finished second by half a length to a four-year-old gelding named Loppylugs, to whom he was conceding 27 pounds.

== Assessment ==
The independent Timeform awarded Hafiz a peak rating of 136 in 1956, making him their second highest-rated horse behind Ribot.

== Stud record ==
At the end of 1956, Hafiz was sold to a syndicate for $384,000 and exported to stand as a stallion in the United States. He sent to MacPhail's Glenangus Farm before being moved to Lexington, Kentucky. He appears to have had very little success as a breeding stallion, siring few winners and nothing of top class. Hafiz died in 1971.

== Pedigree ==
Pedigree of Hafiz, chestnut stallion, 1952
Sire Nearco (ITY)	Pharos (GB)	Phalaris	Polymelus
Sire Nearco (ITY)	Pharos (GB)	Phalaris	Bromus
Sire Nearco (ITY)	Pharos (GB)	Scapa Flow	Chaucer
Sire Nearco (ITY)	Pharos (GB)	Scapa Flow	Anchora
Sire Nearco (ITY)	Nogara (ITY)	Havresac	Rabelais
Sire Nearco (ITY)	Nogara (ITY)	Havresac	Hors Concours
Sire Nearco (ITY)	Nogara (ITY)	Catnip	Spearmint
Sire Nearco (ITY)	Nogara (ITY)	Catnip	Sibola
Dam Double Rose (FR)	Macaron (FR)	Chateau Bouscaut	Kircubbin
Dam Double Rose (FR)	Macaron (FR)	Chateau Bouscaut	Ramondie
Dam Double Rose (FR)	Macaron (FR)	Mesange	Juveigneur
Dam Double Rose (FR)	Macaron (FR)	Mesange	Manzanilla
Dam Double Rose (FR)	Double Call (FR)	Colorado Kid	Colorado
Dam Double Rose (FR)	Double Call (FR)	Colorado Kid	Baby Polly
Dam Double Rose (FR)	Double Call (FR)	Double Shield	Bachelor's Double
Dam Double Rose (FR)	Double Call (FR)	Double Shield	Silver Shield (Family 12-d)
