= Hula Dancer =

American-bred Thoroughbred racehorse

- Sire: Native Dancer
- Grandsire: Polynesian
- Dam: Flash On
- Damsire: Ambrose Light
- Sex: Filly
- Foaled: 1960
- Country: United States
- Colour: Grey
- Breeder: Gertrude T. Widener
- Owner: Gertrude T. Widener
- Trainer: Etienne Pollet
- Record: 8: 7-0-0
- Earnings: 168,912 pounds

Major wins
- Prix de la Salamandre (1962); Grand Critérium (1962); Prix Imprudence (1963); Prix Jacques Le Marois (1963); Prix du Moulin de Longchamp (1963); Champion Stakes (1963) British Classic Race wins: 1,000 Guineas (1963)

Honours
- Prix Hula Dancer at Fontainebleau Racecourse
- Last updated on August 1, 2007

Hula Dancer (foaled 1960 in Kentucky) was an American-bred French-trained Thoroughbred racehorse.

== Background ==
Hula Dancer was a grey mare sired by Native Dancer. Owner Gertrude Widener raced Ambrose Light in France and brought him to the United States to stand at stud where he sired Hula Dancer's dam, Flash On. Mrs. Widener began shipping over a few yearlings every year starting in 1956. She had quite a bit of success with her American bred yearlings winning all of France's top two-year-old races and she also bred the filly Right Away by Right Royal who won the French 1000 Guineas ( POULE DESSAI DES POULICHES) in 1966. She also bred and raced Dan Cupid who went on to sire the great SeaBird II and Dankaro among others.

Gertrude Widener sent Hula Dancer to trainer Etienne Pollet at his stables at Chantilly Racecourse in France.

== Racing career ==
Racing as a two-year-old in 1962, she defeated colts while winning the Prix de la Salamandre and the Grand Critérium, two of France's most important races for her age group. Her win in the Grand Criterium was sensational. She broke the track record for 1 mile at Longchamp in 1:36 and defeated the likes of Relko who went on the next year to win the Epsom Derby along with a whole slew of other stakes races. She was rated 133 as a two-year-old by Timeform and headed the French Free Handicap for two-year-olds. Her win in the Grand Criterium was brilliant and she was hailed as the flying filly because of her brilliant performances.

At age three, Hula Dancer raced both in France and in England where she again defeated colts on a regular basis as well as older horses in the Champion Stakes at Newmarket Racecourse. The highlight of her 1963 racing campaign was a victory in the British Classic, the 1,000 Guineas. Her first performance in England was in the 1,000 Guineas and she started to sweat up badly before the race. She was not brilliant in this win as she only had a length to spare over her rival but it was her courage that got her thru. She was entered in the Epsom Oaks but it was decided not to run her as there appeared to be concerns about her stamina. Her only defeat was in the Prix de Diane at Chantilly in June where she finished 5th. She redeemed herself beautifully with brilliant wins against older horses in the Prix Jaques de Marois and the Prix du Moulin de Longchamp. She ended her fine career with a brilliant in the Champion Stakes at Newmarket where she showed a brilliant turn of foot to defeat a high class field.

Hula Dancer was the first racehorses of her sex to win over 105,160 pounds in a season in 1963. The quality of horses she beat is evidenced by the fact that every one of her six stakes races wins are now Group 1 events. She is regarded as one of the top breeds for 8-10 furlong races.

== Breeding record ==
Hula Dancer was retired to broodmare duty in France. In 1968, Raymond Guest paid a European auction record price of 1.020 million French francs for her. She was shipped to the United States in 1970. Hula Dancer met with limited success as a broodmare. She produced only three living foals.
