= Joseph E. Widener =

American businessman and art collector (1871–1943)

Joseph Early Widener
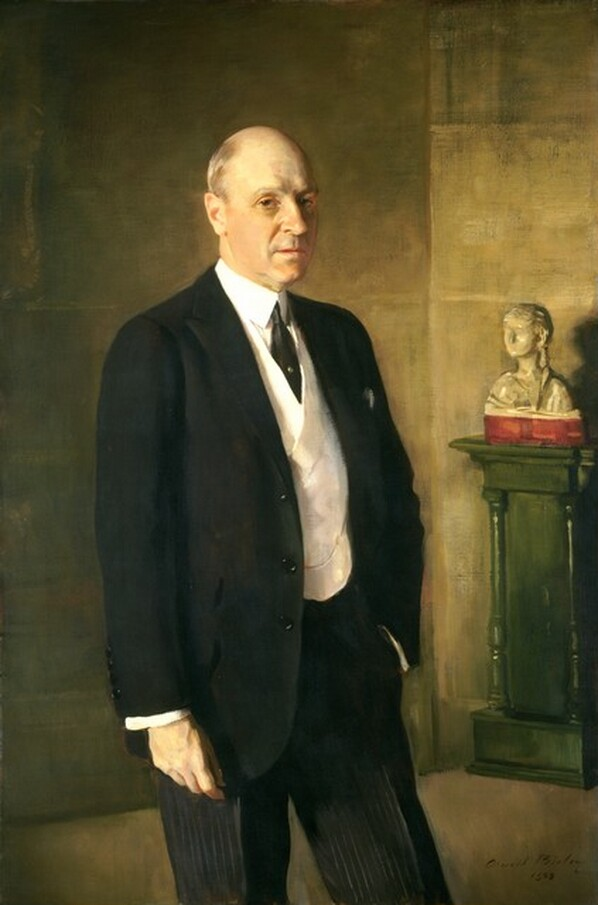
- 1928 portrait by Oswald Birley
- Born: August 19, 1871; Philadelphia, Pennsylvania, US
- Died: October 26, 1943 (aged 72); Elkins Park, Pennsylvania, US
- Resting place: Laurel Hill Cemetery, Philadelphia, Pennsylvania, U.S.
- Education: Harvard University, University of Pennsylvania
- Occupations: Businessman, horseman, art collector, philanthropist
- Spouse: Eleanor Holmes Pancoast
- Children: Peter Arrell Browne Widener II; Josephine "Fifi" Widener
- Parent(s): Peter A. B. Widener & Hannah Josephine Dunton

Joseph Early Widener (August 19, 1871 – October 26, 1943) was an American Thoroughbred horse race owner, breeder, and racetrack owner. He raised seventy-nine stakes race winners, was president of Belmont Park racetrack, and owned Hialeah Park racetrack. He was a member of the wealthy Widener family and managed the family estate. He was an art collector who inherited and refined his father Peter Arrell Browne Widener's vast art collection displayed at their Lynnewood Hall estate. He donated over 2,000 works of art to the National Gallery of Art in Washington, D.C.

== Early life and education ==
Widener was born on August 19, 1871, in Philadelphia, Pennsylvania, to wealthy transportation and real estate magnate Peter Arrell Browne Widener and Hannah Josephine Dunton. His older brother George Dunton Widener and nephew Harry Elkins Widener, died in the sinking of the Titanic. Widener attended Harvard College, and the University of Pennsylvania.

== Career ==
Widener inherited his father's fortune and managed the estate carefully through the Great Depression when other wealthy families floundered.

=== Thoroughbred horse racing ===
Widener used his wealth to pursue his interest in Thoroughbred horse racing. He purchased his first Thoroughbred horses before he was twenty years old. In 1901, Widener began to compete in both flat racing and steeplechase events. He was elected to the Jockey Club in 1909 and served as a steward and vice-chairman. From 1912 to 1943, Widener bred seventy-nine stakes race winners.

He hired future U.S. Racing Hall of Fame horse trainer J. Howard Lewis. For the next four decades, they combined to race fourteen champions, two in flat racing and twelve in steeplechase. Widener's steeplechase horses won numerous important races including three editions of the American Grand National with Relluf (1914), Arc Light (1929), and Bushranger (1936). His steeplechaser Bushranger was elected to the National Museum of Racing and Hall of Fame in 1967 and Fairmount in 1985.

In 1923, Widener and his nephew George D. Widener Jr., purchased a portion of the Elmendorf Farm in Lexington Kentucky. Joseph operated his portion under the Elmendorf name while George renamed his portion Old Kenney Farm.

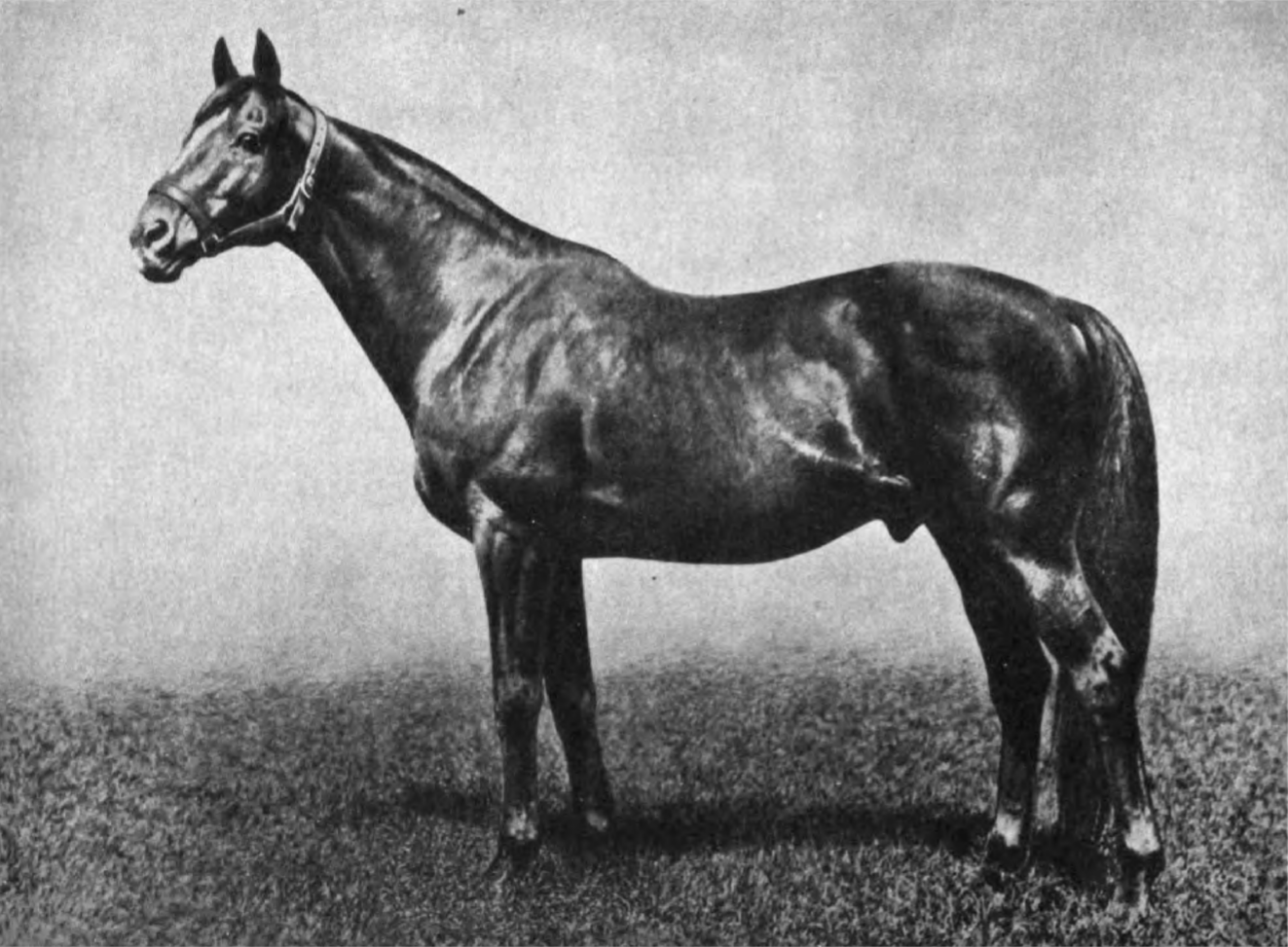
Fair Play was Widener's top sire at his Elmendorf Farm

Following the death of August Belmont Jr., Widener and friends W. Averell Harriman and George Herbert Walker purchased much of Belmont's Thoroughbred breeding stock. For his Elmendorf Farm breeding operation, Widener acquired Belmont's sire Fair Play and the broodmare Mahubah, the parents of Man o' War. He also purchased a son of Fair Play named Chance Shot who would go on to win the 1927 Belmont Stakes and following the 1929 death of Fair Play would become Elmendorf Farm's leading sire. Widener had a life-size statue of Fair Play by Laura Gardin Fraser erected by his grave at Elmendorf Farm.

In 1924, Widener became the president of the Westchester Racing Association which owned Belmont Park in Elmont, New York.

In 1930, he imported the stallion Sickle from Edward Stanley, 17th Earl of Derby in England who came to visit the U.S. that year and was Widener's guest at the 1930 Kentucky Derby. A son of Phalaris, Sickle would produce 43 stakes race winners. One of his most famous offspring, Polynesian, was gifted by Widener to his daughter-in-law, Gertrude T. Widener, as an anniversary gift.

Following Chance Shot's win in the 1927 Belmont Stakes, Widener's racing stable won the race two more times with Hurryoff in 1933 and with a son of Chance Shot in 1934 named Peace Chance. Widener established a stud farm in France.

He was a proponent of parimutuel betting on horse racing in New York which was implemented by the state in 1940.

=== Hialeah Park ===
In 1930, Widener built a 40,000-square-foot (3,700 m^{2}) mansion in Palm Beach, Florida. where he would spend a good part of most winters. That same year, he purchased a controlling interest in the Miami Jockey Club and in 1931 renovated Hialeah Park. Hailed as one of the most beautiful Thoroughbred race tracks in the world, in 1979 Hialeah Park was listed on the United States National Register of Historic Places. Major races held at Hialeah Park included the Widener Handicap, the Flamingo Stakes, and the Hialeah Turf Cup Handicap among others.

=== Art collection ===
Widener and his father assembled an extensive and valuable art collection displayed at Lynnewood Hall. The collection included works from Bellini, Cellini, Degas, Donatello, El Greco, Frans Hals, Gainsborough, Monet, Raphael, Rembrandt, Titian, Van Dyck. The Wideners were known to overpay to collect the finest art from Europe. The collection of art was valued between $15 million and $50 million and was considered one of the world's leading collection of Rembrandts.

After his brother George's death in 1912, Widener assumed responsibility for the management of the Widener art collection. He refined the art collection, reduced the number of works and separated the gallery into two distinct sections. He allowed the public to enter Lynnewood Hall to view the art from June to October every year. He installed chairs and benches for viewers to rest and played soft music through speakers on the walls. During one viewing, a woman attacked a painting by Rembrandt, The Mill, with a hat pin but did not damage the painting.

In 1939, Widener made a number of donations from his assorted collections including manuscripts of historical and artistic importance given to the Rare Book Department at the Free Library of Philadelphia. However, his most important philanthropic endeavor was as founding benefactor of the National Gallery of Art in Washington, D.C. In 1942, Widener donated over 2,000 pieces of art to the museum. Widener was quoted as saying, "Art belongs to those who appreciate it. Others merely own it." Widener's own 1921 portrait by Augustus John hangs in the National Gallery of Art.

== Personal life ==
On March 27, 1894, Widener married Ella Pancoast and together they had two children, Peter Arrell Browne Widener II and Josephine "Fifi" Widener

Widener raised his family at Lynnewood Hall, his father's 110-room Georgian-style mansion in Elkins Park, Pennsylvania. Designed by Horace Trumbauer and Jacques Greber, the mansion, along with its extensive and important art collection, was part of the huge fortune he inherited.

In 1919, he was nominated to the University of Pennsylvania Board of Trustees. In 1929, he hosted Winston Churchill at Lynnewood Hall during his tour of the United States.

In poor health for several years, Widener died on October 26, 1943, at Lynnewood Hall and was interred in the Widener family mausoleum, Section K, Lot 338 at Laurel Hill Cemetery in Philadelphia.

== Additional reading ==
- Joseph Early Widener, Paintings in the Collection of Joseph Widener at Lynnewood Hall (Elkins Park, Pennsylvania: privately printed, 1923).
