= Sickle (horse) =

British-bred Thoroughbred racehorse

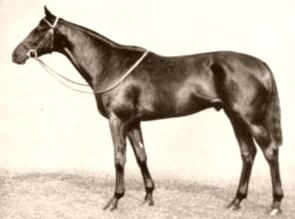
- Sire: Phalaris
- Grandsire: Polymelus
- Dam: Selene
- Damsire: Chaucer
- Sex: Stallion
- Foaled: 8 February 1924
- Country: England
- Colour: Brown
- Breeder: Edward Stanley, 17th Earl of Derby
- Owner: 1) 17th Earl of Derby; 2) Joseph E. Widener (at stud)
- Trainer: George Lambton
- Record: 10: 3–4–2
- Earnings: US$24,122

Major wins
- Mersey Stakes (1926); Goodwood Prince of Wales's Stakes (1926); Boscawen Post Stakes (1926)

Awards
- Leading sire in North America (1936, 1938)

Sickle (8 February 1924 – 26 December 1943) was a British-bred thoroughbred racehorse who was later exported to the US where he was twice the leading sire in North America. He was bred by Edward Stanley, 17th Earl of Derby.

Sickle was a full brother to Pharamond, who also was a successful sire in the US Their sire Phalaris, was twice the leading sire in Great Britain and Ireland and a three-time leading broodmare sire in Great Britain & Ireland. His dam Selene produced 16 named foals including the leading Argentine and Brazilian sire Hunter's Moon, and Hyperion, the 1933 Epsom Derby and St Leger Stakes winner and a six-time leading sire in Great Britain and Ireland as well as a four-time leading broodmare sire in Great Britain and Ireland. Pharamond and Sickle were inbred to Cyllene in the third and fourth generation (3Sx4D) and St. Simon in the third and fourth generation (4Sx3D).

Sickle was raced by Lord Derby and trained by George Lambton. The colt met with some success in racing, winning three of his ten starts and notably finishing third in a field of 23 in the 2,000 Guineas Stakes in 1927.

== Stud record ==
Retired to Lord Derby's stud for the 1929 breeding season, in a three-year lease agreement with American Joseph E. Widener that included a US$100,000 option to purchase, Sickle was sent to the US in time for the 1930 breeding season at Widener's Elmendorf Farm. In England, Sickle's first crop produced three stakes winners and in 1932 Widener exercised his option and purchased the horse. His first offspring in the US also met with racing success and Sickle went on to become a two-time leading sire in the US during his stud career, in 1936 and again in 1938. He was the sire of 297 foals, including 45 stakes winners. His progeny includes:

Foaled	Name	Sex	Major Wins/Achievements
1931	Hindu Queen	Mare	Multiple stakes winner
1931	Jabot	Mare	Multiple stakes winner
1933	Brevity	Stallion	Multiple stakes winner
1934	Reaping Reward	Stallion	Multiple stakes winner
1935	Cravat	Stallion	
1935	Sickle T	Gelding	Multiple stakes winner
1935	Silver Spear	Stallion	Durban July Handicap (1937)
1935	Stagehand	Stallion	American Champion Three-Year-Old Male Horse (1938)
1938	Minty Isle	Mare	Multiple stakes winner
1941	Director J E	Stallion	Multiple stakes winner
1942	Chief Barker	Stallion	Multiple stakes winner
1942	Concordian	Stallion	Multiple stakes winner
1942	Price Level	Mare	Multiple stakes winner
1943	Star Pilot	Stallion	American Champion Two-Year-Old Colt (1945)
1944	Brownian	Mare	Multiple stakes winner

Sickle's bloodline legacy came through his son Unbreakable who sired the 1945 Preakness Stakes winner and the 1947 American Champion Sprint Horse, Polynesian. Polynesian in turn sired the US Racing Hall of Fame inductee Native Dancer who was rated No.7 in the Blood-Horse Magazine List of the Top 100 US Racehorses of the 20th Century. Native Dancer sired Raise A Native, and was the damsire of Northern Dancer. Polynesian also sired the 1956 American Champion Two-Year-Old Colt, Barbizon, plus Imbros, a multiple stakes winner who set or equalled five track records including a world record for 7 furlongs, and the very good runner and important broodmare, Alanesian. Because of Polynesian, Sickle's sireline includes Sea Bird, the 1965 Epsom Derby and Prix de l'Arc de Triomphe winner whose Timeform rating is the second highest ever awarded in flat racing, and the very influential Mr. Prospector, a two-time leading sire in North America and nine-time leading broodmare sire in North America.

Sickle was the damsire of Kersala, the 1958 Kentucky Broodmare of the Year, as well as the damsire of these four Champions:

Foaled	Name	Sex	Major Wins/Achievements
1944	But Why Not	Mare	American Champion Three-Year-Old Filly (1947), American Champion Older Female Horse (1947)
1946	Oedipus	Stallion	American Champion Steeplechase Horse (1950, 1951, 1952)
1948	Counterpoint	Stallion	Belmont Stakes (1951), American Horse of the Year (1951), American Champion Three-Year-Old Male Horse (1951)
1953	Bornastar	Mare	American Champion Older Female Horse (1958)

At age nineteen, Sickle died unexpectedly on 26 December 1943 and was buried in the Elmendorf equine cemetery on acreage that was later subdivided and is now known as Normandy Farm.

== Pedigree ==
Pedigree of Sickle (GB), brown stallion, 1924
Sire Phalaris (GB) 1913	Polymelus (GB); 1902	Cyllene	Bona Vista
Sire Phalaris (GB) 1913	Polymelus (GB); 1902	Cyllene	Arcadia
Sire Phalaris (GB) 1913	Polymelus (GB); 1902	Maid Marian	Hampton
Sire Phalaris (GB) 1913	Polymelus (GB); 1902	Maid Marian	Quiver
Sire Phalaris (GB) 1913	Bromus (GB); 1905	Sainfoin	Springfield
Sire Phalaris (GB) 1913	Bromus (GB); 1905	Sainfoin	Sanda
Sire Phalaris (GB) 1913	Bromus (GB); 1905	Cheery	St. Simon
Sire Phalaris (GB) 1913	Bromus (GB); 1905	Cheery	Sunrise
Dam Selene (GB) 1919	Chaucer; 1900	St. Simon	Galopin
Dam Selene (GB) 1919	Chaucer; 1900	St. Simon	St. Angela
Dam Selene (GB) 1919	Chaucer; 1900	Canterbury Pilgrim	Tristan
Dam Selene (GB) 1919	Chaucer; 1900	Canterbury Pilgrim	Pilgrimage
Dam Selene (GB) 1919	Serenissima; 1913	Minoru	Cyllene
Dam Selene (GB) 1919	Serenissima; 1913	Minoru	Mother Siegel
Dam Selene (GB) 1919	Serenissima; 1913	Gondolette	Loved One
Dam Selene (GB) 1919	Serenissima; 1913	Gondolette	Dongola
