= Peter Arrell Browne Widener =

American businessman (1834–1915)

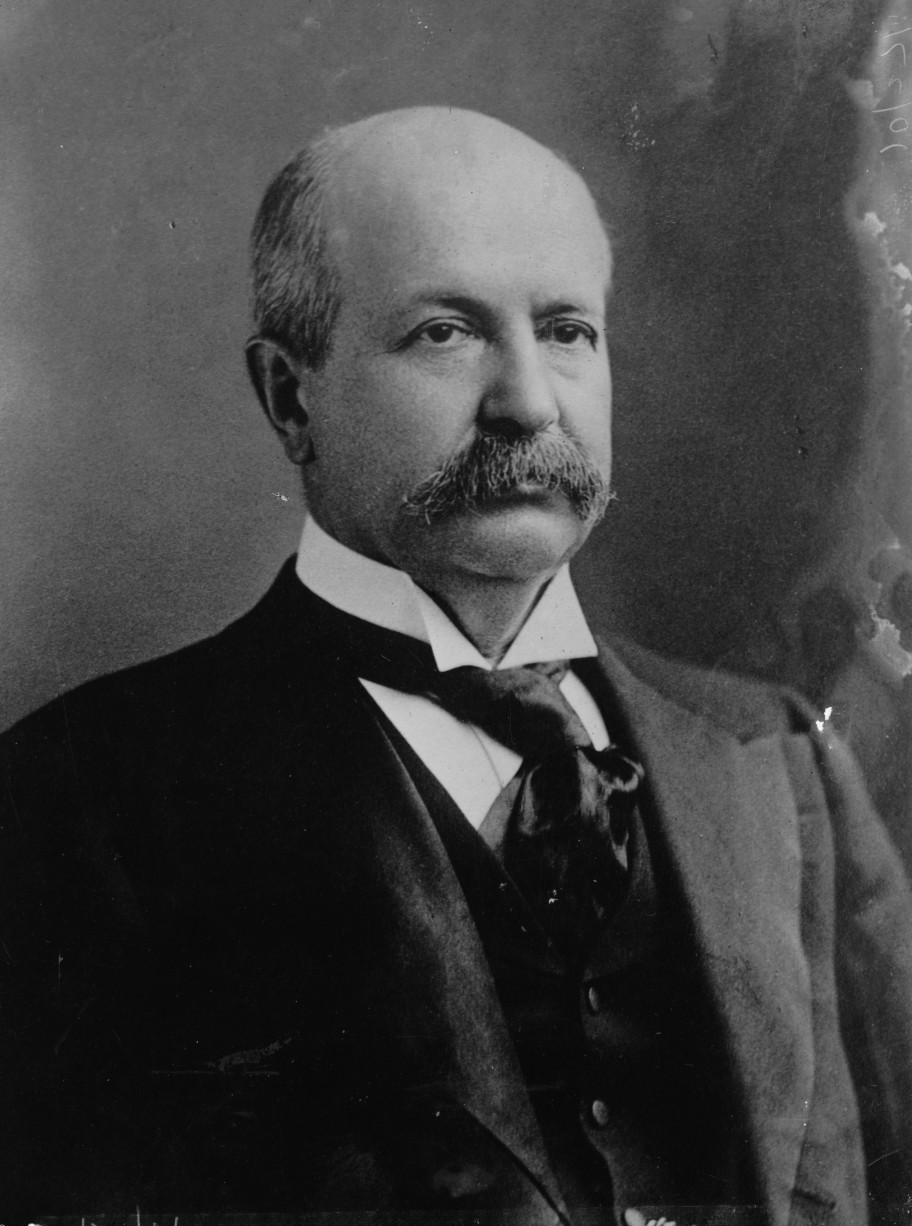
- Born: November 13, 1834; Philadelphia, Pennsylvania, U.S.
- Died: November 6, 1915 (aged 80); Elkins Park, Pennsylvania, US
- Resting place: Laurel Hill Cemetery, Philadelphia, Pennsylvania, U.S.
- Occupations: Businessman, art collector, philanthropist
- Known for: Co-founder Philadelphia Traction Company, U.S. Steel, American Tobacco, International Mercantile Marine Company
- Spouse: Hannah Josephine Dunton
- Children: Harry Widener; George Dunton Widener; Joseph E. Widener

Peter Arrell Browne Widener (November 13, 1834 – November 6, 1915) was an American businessman, art collector, and patriarch of the wealthy Widener family. He began his career as a butcher, ran a successful chain of meat stores, and won a lucrative contract to supply mutton to Union army troops during the American Civil War. He partnered with William Lukens Elkins and William H. Kemble to found the Philadelphia Traction Company and established electric trolley systems in several major cities in the United States.

He was one of the founding organizers of American Tobacco Company, International Mercantile Marine Company, and U.S. Steel, and held significant investments in railroads, oil, and natural gas. He assembled a vast art collection valued between $15 and $50 million that he displayed at his Lynnewood Hall estate. Widener is on the American Heritage list of the forty richest Americans in history.

== Early life ==
Widener was born on November 13, 1834, in Philadelphia, Pennsylvania, to Johannes Widener and Sarah Fulmer. He was named after Peter Arrell Browne, a lawyer in Philadelphia. He attended Central High School in Philadelphia and excelled in mathematics.

== Career ==
Widener began his career as a butcher and established a successful business with a chain of meat stores. During the American Civil War, Widener won a contract to supply mutton to all Union army troops within 10 miles of Philadelphia. The city was a major transportation hub for troop deployment and the location of many of the largest Union military hospitals. Widener partnered with William Lukens Elkins and invested his $50,000 profit into horse-drawn city streetcar lines.

In 1883, he, Elkins, and William H. Kemble founded the Philadelphia Traction Company to build electric trolley lines. They consolidated all the trolley lines in Philadelphia and through a series of leases, the company eventually became a part of the Philadelphia Transportation Company. They expanded to New York and partnered with Thomas Fortune Ryan and William Collins Whitney to build electric trolley lines. They partnered with Charles Yerkes and secured the electric trolley lines on the North side of Chicago. They went on to build electric trolley lines in Pittsburgh and Baltimore. The Widener-Elkins-Kemble traction group built more miles of electric trolley lines than any other syndicate at the time.

Widener was a founding organizer of American Tobacco Company, International Mercantile Marine Company, and U.S. Steel. He held significant investments in Baltimore and Ohio Railroad, Reading Company, Standard Oil, and United Gas Improvement Company. He is considered to have been among the 100 wealthiest Americans, having left an enormous fortune. He grew to prominence in Philadelphia politics. He served on the Philadelphia Board of Education from 1867 to 1870, as the Philadelphia City Treasurer from 1870 to 1877, and as the Philadelphia City Park Commissioner in 1890. His appointment as City Treasurer came from the local boss of the infamous Matthew Quay political machine.

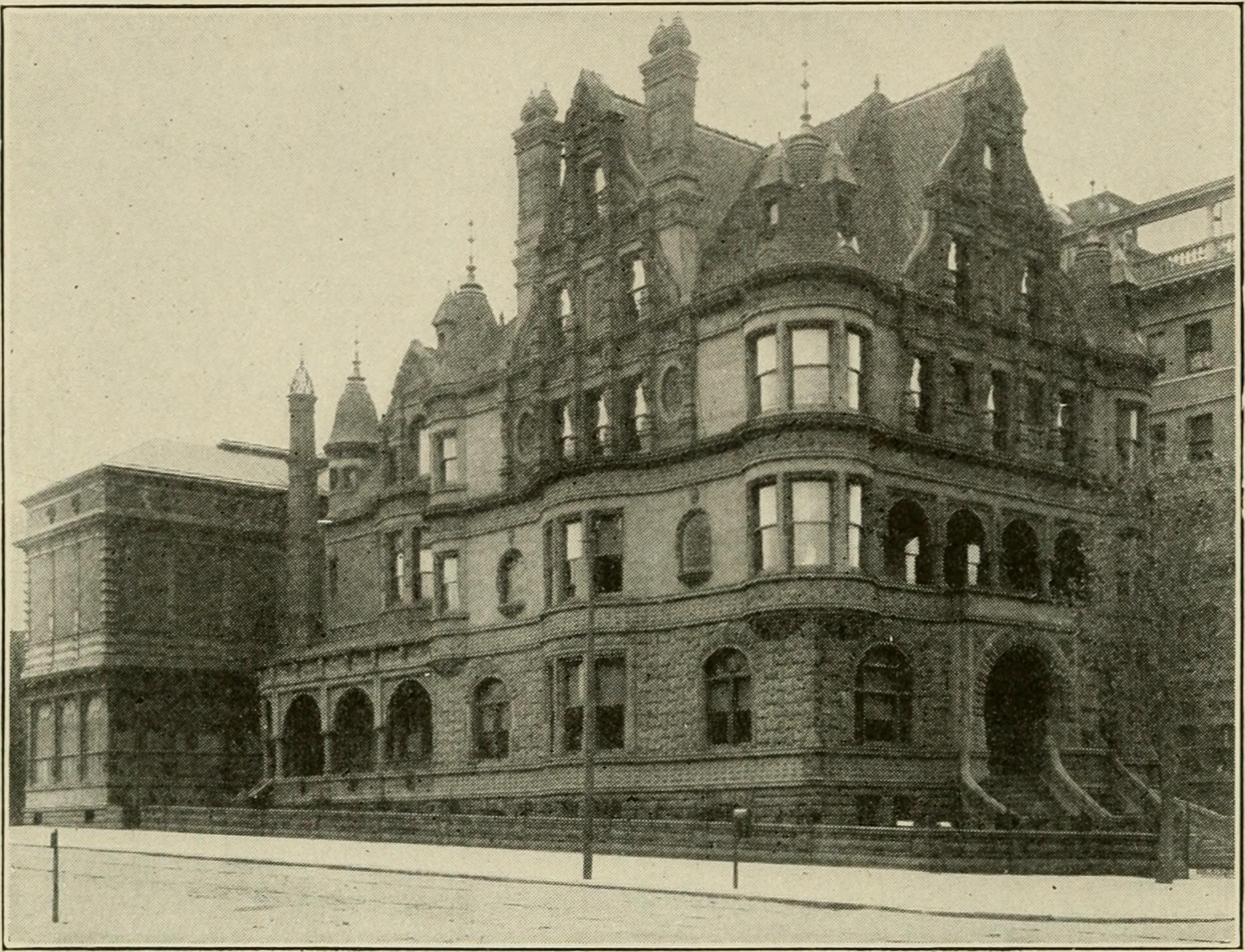
The Widener mansion at the northwest corner of Broad Street and Girard Avenue in Philadelphia

In 1887, Widener built an ornate mansion, designed by Willis G. Hale, in Philadelphia, at the northwest corner of Broad Street and Girard Avenue. He began to amass his art collection at the mansion on Broad Street but it soon became overcrowded. He vacated it 13 years later and donated it as a memorial for his late wife to the Free Library of Philadelphia, as the H. Josephine Widener Memorial Library. The building caught fire in 1980 and was demolished.

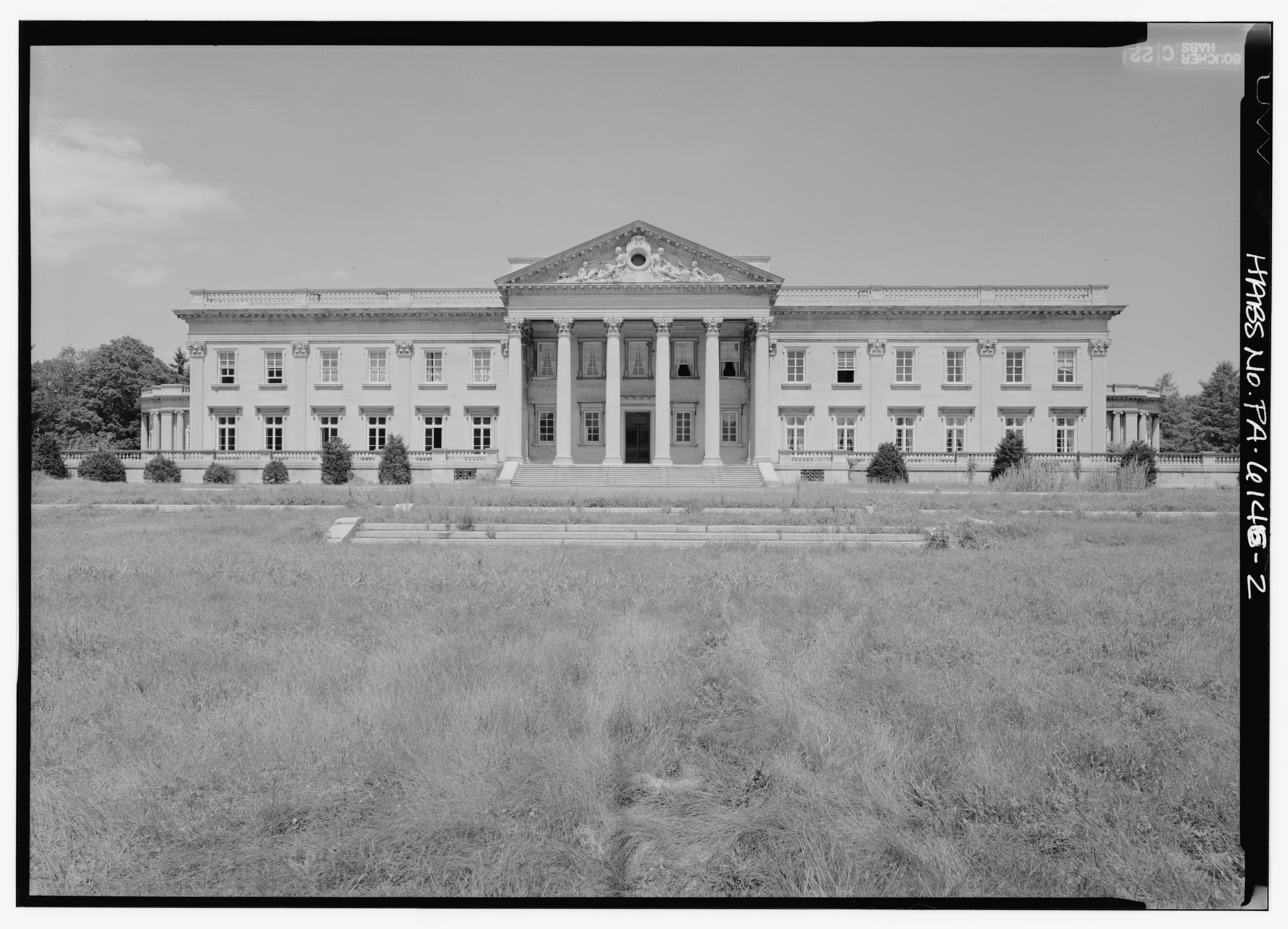
Lynnewood Hall in Elkins Park, Pennsylvania

In 1897, Widener began construction of Lynnewood Hall, a 110 room mansion designed by Horace Trumbauer, on a 300-acre plot of land in Elkins Park, Pennsylvania. The estate was opened with a gala held on December 18, 1899. In 1902, he founded the Widener Memorial Home for Crippled Children, as a memorial to his wife and first son Harry. In 1941, the home was transferred to the School District of Philadelphia is currently used as a public school, Widener Memorial School.

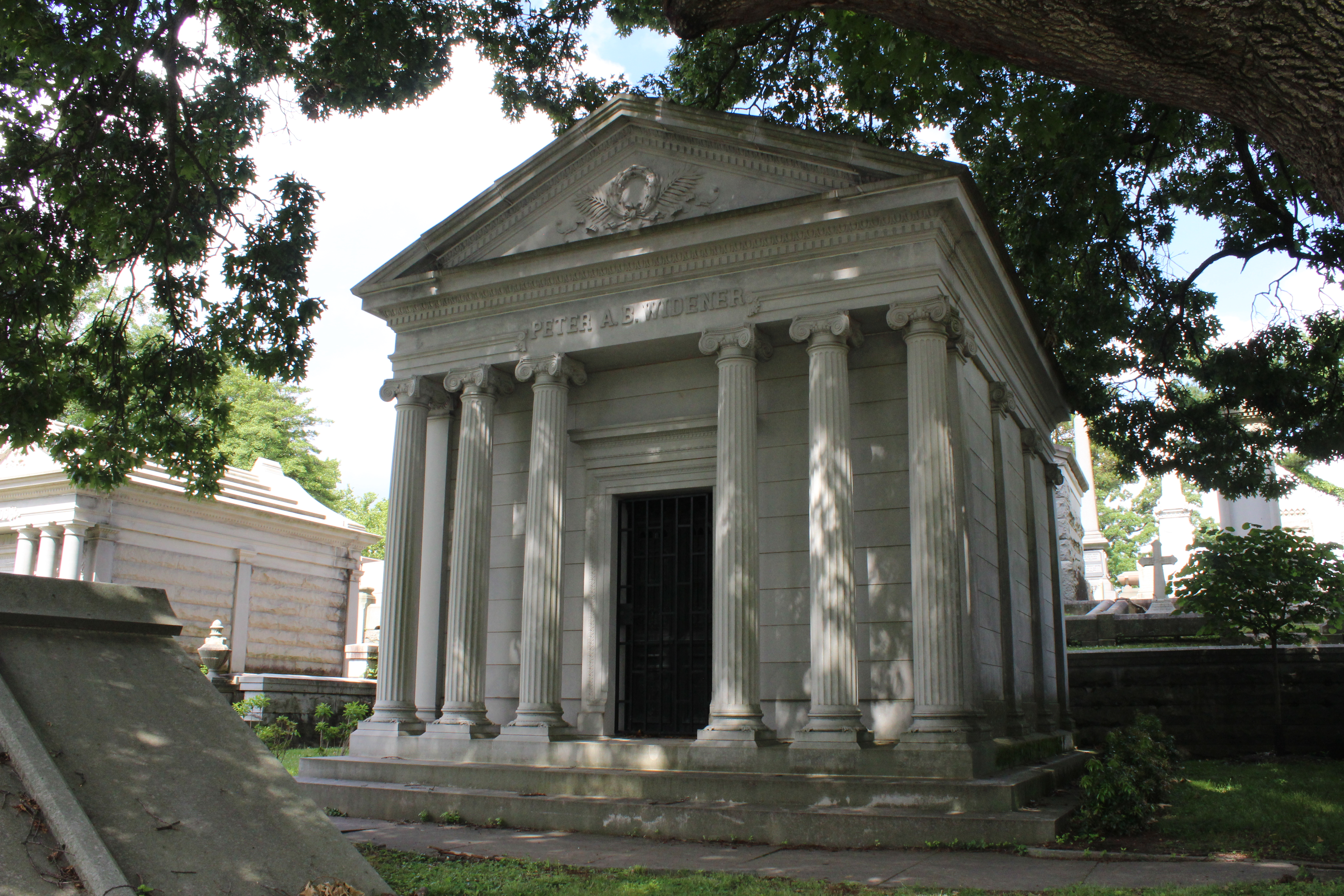
Widener mausoleum in Laurel Hill Cemetery

Widener suffered from diabetes and died on November 6, 1915, at Lynnewood Hall after being in poor health for three years. He was interred at Laurel Hill Cemetery in Philadelphia. After his death, his estate was valued at $31,589,353. By 1945, the accumulated income plus the current value of the real and personal property totaled $98,368,058.

== Art collection ==
During his lifetime, Widener and his son Joseph assembled an extensive art collection displayed at Lynnewood Hall, and was considered one of the greatest private collections amassed in U.S. history. Widener was known to overpay to collect the finest art from Europe. The collection was valued between $15 million and $50 million and was considered one of the world's leading collections of Old Master and Italian Renaissance art. The collection numbered over 2,000 artworks and included works by Bellini, Cellini, Degas, Donatello, El Greco, Frans Hals, Gainsborough, Raphael, Titian, and Van Dyck. In 1905, Widener purchased the crucifixion panel from Rogier van der Weyden's Crucifixion Diptych (c. 1460) in Paris. The following year he sold it to John G. Johnson, who reunited the two halves and later donated them to the Philadelphia Museum of Art.

After original plans to donate to the Philadelphia Museum of Art failed, Joseph donated the entire art collection at Lynnewood Hall to the National Gallery of Art in 1942.

== Personal life and family ==
He married Hannah Josephine Dunton on August 18, 1858, and they had three sons. Their first son Harry died from typhoid fever in 1871 at 11 years of age. George Dunton Widener and his son Harry Elkins Widener died during the sinking of the Titanic. His youngest son Joseph Early Widener inherited his father's fortune, managed the family estate, and refined the art collection. His grandson, George D. Widener Jr., a noted horse racing figure, was also the chairman of the Philadelphia Museum of Art.

Widener's eldest brother, George (1820–1901), served as a member of the Philadelphia City Council. The two brothers were, at one time, business partners.

== Additional reading ==
- Peter Arrell Browne Widener, Pictures in the Collection of P.A.B. Widener at Lynnewood Hall, Elkins Park Pennsylvania., Philadelphia: Privately Printed, 1913
