= Lynnewood Hall =

Mansion in Elkins Park, Pennsylvania

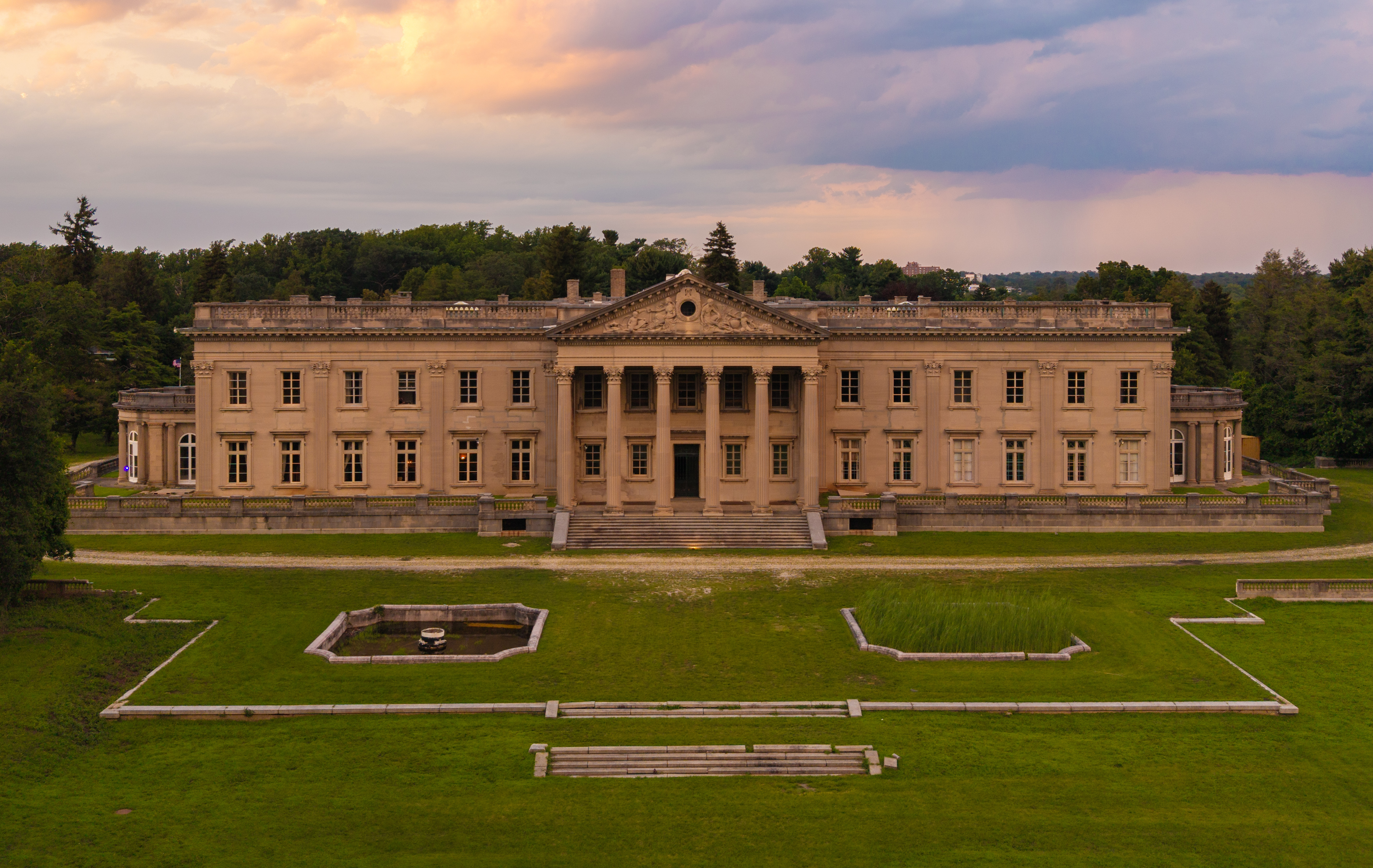
- An aerial view of the mansion, 2025

General information
- Architectural style: Neoclassical Revival
- Location: 920 Spring Ave., Elkins Park, Pennsylvania, United States
- Coordinates: 40°4′30.67″N 75°8′27.01″W
- Construction started: 1897
- Completed: 1899
- Cost: $8 million (equivalent to $310 million in 2025)
- Client: Peter A. B. Widener
- Owner: Lynnewood Hall Preservation Foundation (purchased from First Korean Church of New York in 2023)

Technical details
- Floor area: 109,848 square feet (10,205.2 m^{2})

Design and construction
- Architect: Horace Trumbauer
- Lynnewood Hall
- U.S. National Register of Historic Places
- NRHP reference No.: 100012095
- Added to NRHP: August 13, 2025

Lynnewood Hall is a 110-room Neoclassical Revival mansion in Elkins Park, Pennsylvania. It was designed by the architect Horace Trumbauer for the industrialist Peter A. B. Widener and built between 1897 and 1899. Lynnewood Hall is the second largest surviving Gilded Age mansion in the United States after the Biltmore Estate, and once housed one of the most significant art collections in U.S. history which was donated entirely to the National Gallery of Art in 1942.

Peter Widener died at Lynnewood Hall at the age of 80 on November 6, 1915 after prolonged poor health. He was predeceased by his elder son George Dunton Widener and grandson Harry Elkins Widener, both of whom died in the RMS Titanic sinking in 1912. The building changed hands a few times over the subsequent decades, with large portions of the estate grounds sold off in the 1940s. It hosted a Bible Presbyterian Church seminary from 1952 until the late 1990s, when the property was abandoned. In 2023, Lynnewood Hall was purchased by the Lynnewood Hall Preservation Foundation, which has announced plans to restore the house and grounds. The property was listed on the National Register of Historic Places in 2025.

== Description ==
Constructed from Indiana limestone, the T-shaped mansion measures 268 feet (82 m) long by 215 feet (66 m) deep. In addition to 55 bedrooms, the 110-room mansion had a large art gallery, a ballroom large enough for 1,000 guests, a swimming pool, wine cellars, a farm, carpentry and upholstery studios, and an electrical power plant. The estate originally encompassed 300 acres, upon 33 of which a fenced ornamental garden was constructed. The fenced area includes a gatehouse and smaller Lynnewood Lodge (also known as Conklin Hall), built in the same style as the mansion. The mansion's grounds have remained contiguous since the 1952 sale.

=== Art collection ===
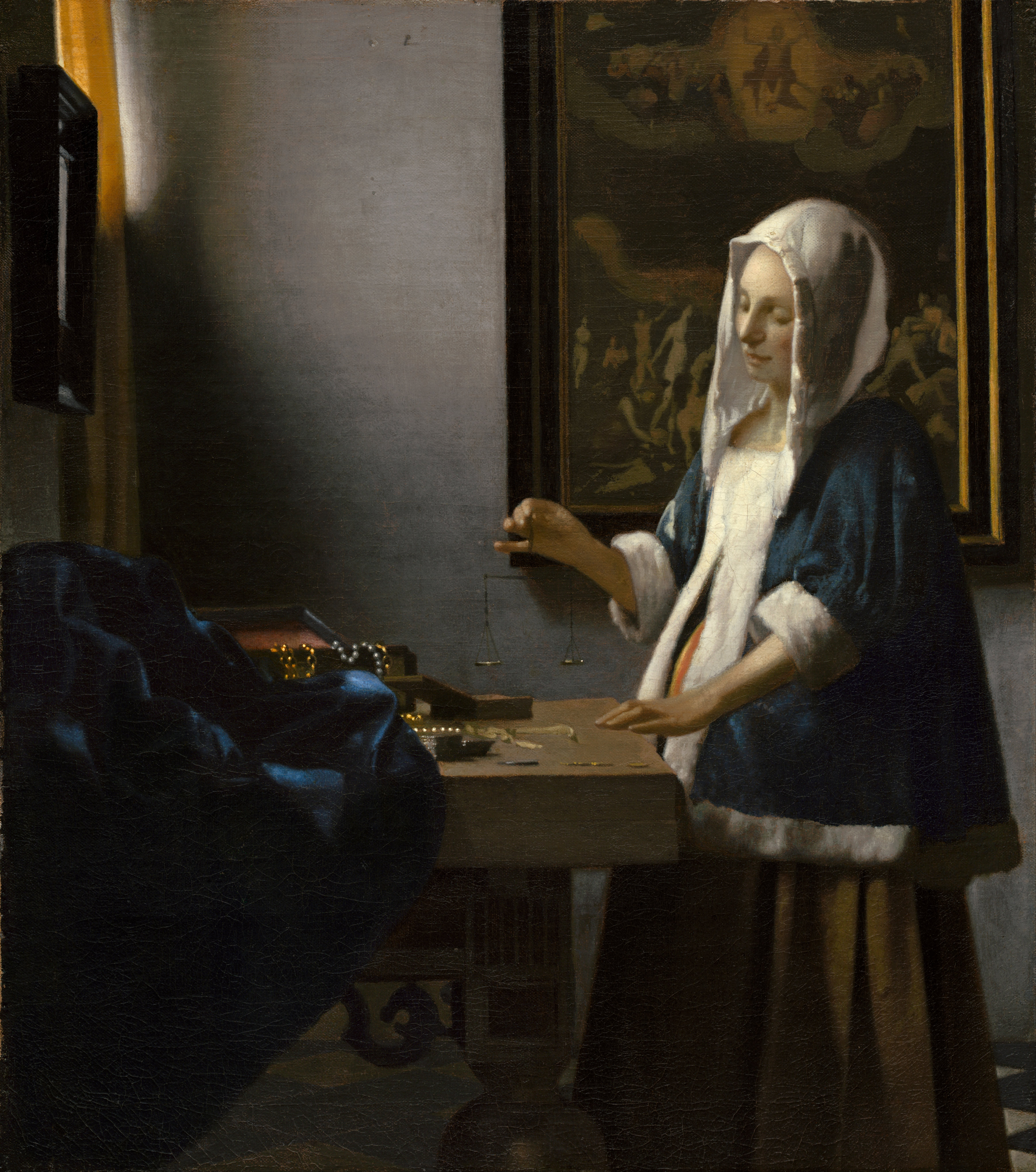
Vermeer's Woman Holding a Balance, once part of the Widener Collection

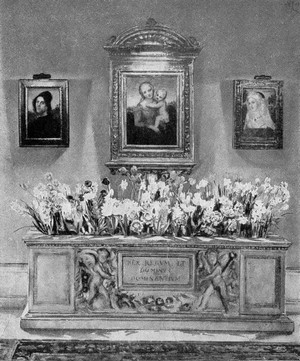
A 1917 portrait of the Raphael Room at Lynnewood Hall by William Bruce Ellis Ranken

Encompassing more than 2,000 works at its height, Lynnewood Hall housed one of the greatest art collections amassed in U.S. history. Entire halls were custom designed and dedicated to art, and rooms were furnished with chairs and tables from Florentine villas and Versailles, Persian rugs, and Qing dynasty porcelain. The collection of paintings itself numbered over 400 works by Old Masters, including Rembrandt, Velázquez, El Greco, and van Dyck. The Italian Renaissance collection was considered exceptionally strong, with works ranging from Sienese paintings to masterpieces by artists including Raphael, Verrocchio, Titian, and Donatello. From 1915 to 1940, the art collection was opened to the public by appointment between June and October. As early as 1924, Joseph E. Widener stated that his collection would be presented to the public as a memorial to his late father P.A.B. Widener, however after a site for the Widener memorial art museum was selected and fell through, Widener and his family began search for a home for the collection either at the Philadelphia Museum of Art or the National Gallery of Art in Washington, D.C..

In 1942, after the original plan to donate to the Philadelphia Museum of Art failed, Joseph E. Widener gifted the entire collection to the National Gallery of Art. The paintings included Raphael's Small Cowper Madonna, Bellini's The Feast of the Gods, eight van Dycks, two Vermeers, fourteen Rembrandts, one Renoir, and a series of portraits by Gainsborough and Reynolds. Sculptures included Donatello's David and Desiderio da Settignano's St John the Baptist.

== History ==
=== Construction and early years ===
By the time Horace Trumbauer was commissioned by Peter A.B. Widener to build Lynnewood Hall, he had already designed the Widener family's Philadelphia and New York City properties. Trumbauer collaborated with the French firm Carlhian et Fils to design the mansion's interiors utilizing large amounts of salvaged European furniture, tapestries, and paneling. The two-story central atrium, known as the Great Hall, was modeled after that of The Breakers manor in Newport, Rhode Island. Following an Italianate theme, the mansion's 18th-century ballroom, one of the largest on the eastern seaboard, had furniture imported from Italy, and the Raphael Room was affixed with a 15th century Italian painted ceiling and medieval stained glass windows. Construction began in 1897, and the mansion was opened after only two years of construction with a grand gala held on December 19, 1899. 400 guests, mostly members of Philadelphia high society, attended, and the New York Symphony and Johanna Gadski performed musical accompaniments to the celebration. The mansion was built on a property of 300 acres, and its Italian-style ornamental gardens, covering 33 acres, were originally fashioned by head gardener William Kleinheinz. The gardens included a large fountain by Henri-Léon Gréber, one of only two major surviving Gréber commissions in America.

=== After Peter A.B. Widener's death ===
Upon Peter A.B. Widener's death in 1915, the property passed to his son, Joseph. In 1916, the gardens were redesigned in the French style by Jacques Gréber, also master designer of the Benjamin Franklin Parkway and, later, the 1937 Paris Exhibition. Boasting stables, greenhouses, a polo field, and a reservoir, the estate employed a staff of 100 at its peak. TIME magazine published an account of a lavish party held at Lynnewood Hall in 1932.

Joseph's son, Peter A.B. Widener II, was a passionate dog breeder, constructing extensive kennels on the property starting in 1920. As a result, the grounds were used for training military dogs during World War II. Joseph Widener donated the estate's art collection to the National Gallery of Art in 1942, and upon his death one year later, the southern part of the estate was sold for development in 1943. The house, its gardens, and its outlying buildings were sold shortly afterwards to a private buyer who hoped to turn the property into a Protestant seminary; when this buyer defaulted on his $99,000 mortgage, the property was temporarily repossessed by the Wideners.

=== Sale and seminary use ===
The property was purchased in 1952 by Faith Theological Seminary, a Christian higher education institution headed by Carl McIntire. The purchase price was US$192,000 (equivalent to $2,330,000 in 2025). The Seminary trained hundreds of ministers and Christian leaders at Lynnewood Hall for over 40 years, but as the Seminary began to experience financial difficulties, it dismantled large parts of the mansion's interior. In 1996, the property was sold in a Sheriff's Sale to the First Korean Church of New York, a Presbyterian-affiliated church with ties to Faith Theological Seminary. By the time of the property's purchase, all three of the remaining buildings on the property, Lynnewood Hall, Lynnewood Lodge, and the gatehouse, were in various states of dilapidation, with the gatehouse being fully abandoned. First Korean Church sought numerous times to turn the property back into a seminary and church, beginning in 1998, but failed to in a string of applications and lawsuits.

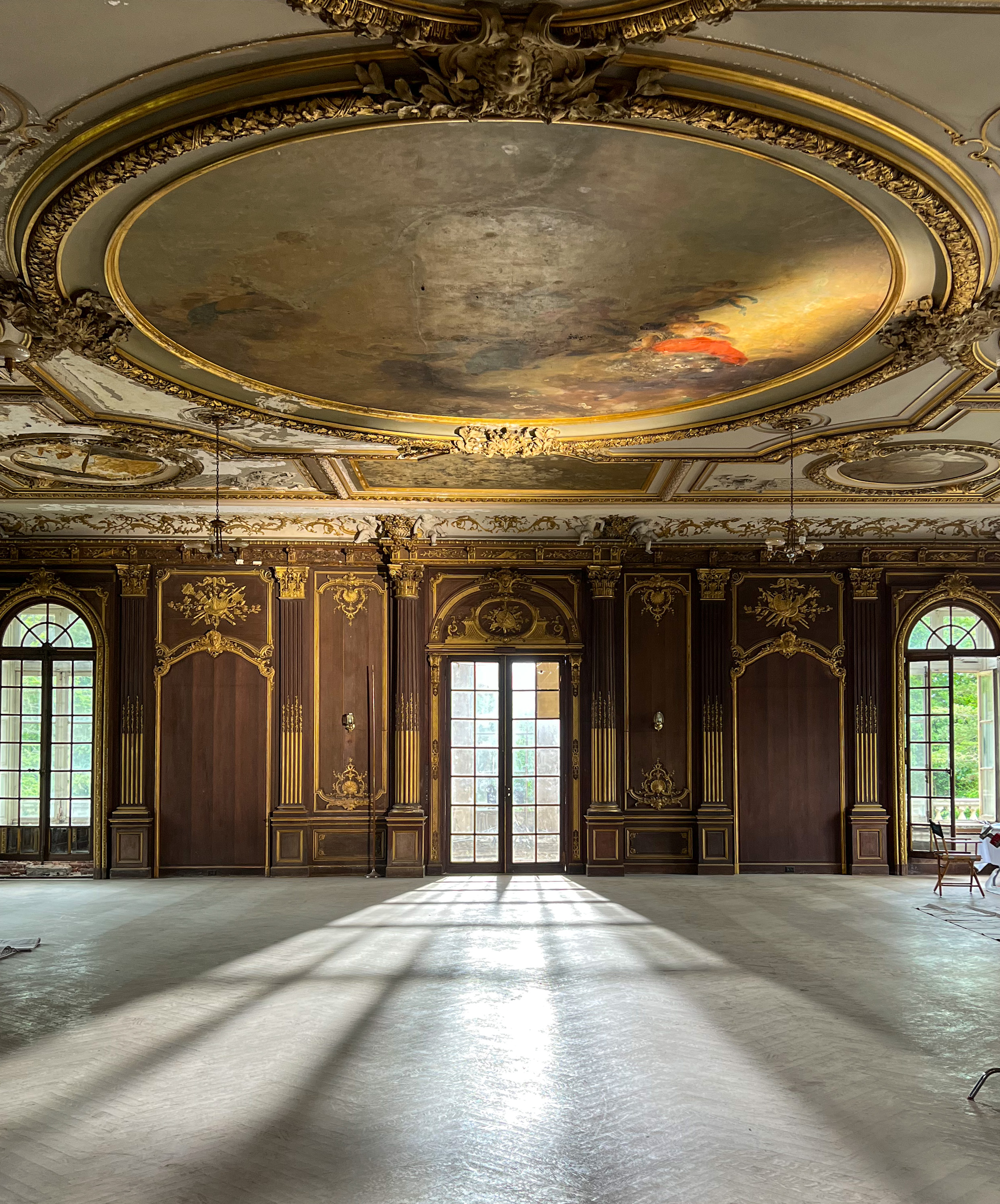
The mansion's ballroom in 2023, with its Jules Allard and Sons designed ceiling

In 2006, in First Korean Church of N.Y., Inc. v. Montgomery Cnty. Bd. of Assessment Appeals, the court found that the property had not demonstrably been used for religious or educational purposes since 1998. The church continued to sell off remaining parts of the property, and in 2006, Lynnewood Hall's Gréber fountain was sold at auction through Bonhams. After a final February 2012 ruling that First Korean Church did not qualify for tax exemption status, Dr. Richard S. Yoon, the church's president and pastor, gave an interview to the Philadelphia Inquirer where he stated his intent to relocate the church and end the legal battle.

=== Further sale and restoration ===
Despite retaining ownership rights, the Korean Church vacated the mansion in 2013, and the property was put on the market for $11,000,000 in May 2019. Despite multiple offers above the asking price, the home remained unsold. By 2018, vandalism and theft issues had grown so severe the Korean Church was forced to install surveillance cameras and advanced monitoring systems around the property. A historical restoration architect estimated in 2014 that it would take about $50 million to restore the mansion to its former glory.

On July 5, 2022, it was announced that Lynnewood Hall Preservation Foundation was established with the goal of acquiring "the Trumbauer-designed Widener Family Estate, a true architectural masterpiece, and see it restored to its former breathtaking glory." On February 8, 2023, a purchase agreement was announced for the property by the foundation, with plans for the restored gardens to be open to the public as a park, and to fully restore the hall. On June 27, 2023, the mansion's sale was finalized for $9 million, and ownership passed to the nonprofit Lynnewood Hall Preservation Foundation. The purchase was primarily funded by a $9.5 million donation from board chairman Scott Bentley (a founding partner of Bentley Systems) and his wife Susan.

== In popular culture ==
A music video for the song "Come on Heartache" by the band The Menzingers was filmed onsite at Lynnewood Hall in September 2023. In September 2026 the band Clutch released a music video for the song "Wasted Lands" which was also filmed at Lynnewood Hall.

== See also ==
- National Register of Historic Places in Montgomery County, Pennsylvania
- The Breakers
