= Happy Hill Farm =

American racehorse breeder

Happy Hill Farm is a Thoroughbred horse racing operation in Newtown Township, Delaware County, Pennsylvania. It was originally owned by Cortright Wetherill (1923-1988) and his wife Ella A. Widener-Wetherill (1928-1986) whose Widener family of Philadelphia is one of the most prominent and respected in American Thoroughbred racing history.

Most notably, Happy Hill Farm was the breeder of the Kentucky-born stallion Raise a Native who became one of the most important sires in North America. With trainer Frank I. Wright, the Wetherills had a number of successes on the racetrack. In 1968, Ludham won the New York and Sheepshead Bay Handicaps. Their gelding Kingmaker won races from age three through five including the Whitney Handicap and New Orleans Handicap in 1957 and in 1958, the Excelsior Handicap.

In recent years, Peter Wetherill raced multiple winner Self Rising, a son of Classic Race winner Hansel, and currently has Academy Royale, sired by Breeders' Cup Mile winner Royal Academy, along with a few other horses competing on the New York racing circuit, all of which are trained by Peter D. Pugh.
