= Polynesian (horse) =

American-bred Thoroughbred racehorse

- Sire: Unbreakable
- Grandsire: Sickle
- Dam: Black Polly
- Damsire: Polymelian
- Sex: Stallion
- Foaled: 8 March 1942
- Country: United States
- Colour: Brown
- Breeder: Elmendorf Farm
- Owner: Gertrude T. Widener
- Trainer: Morris H. Dixon
- Record: 58: 27-10-10
- Earnings: $310,410

Major wins
- Withers Stakes (1945); Riggs Handicap (1946); Roseben Handicap (1946); Toboggan Handicap (1946); Scarsdale Handicap (1946); Long Branch Handicap (1947); Camden Handicap (1947); Oceanport Handicap (1947) American Classic Race wins: Preakness Stakes (1945)

Awards
- American Champion Sprint Horse (1947)

Polynesian (March 8, 1942 – December 29, 1959) was an American Thoroughbred racehorse and sire.

== Background ==
He was owned by Gertrude T. Widener, of the prominent Widener family of Philadelphia, and bred by her father-in-law Joseph E. Widener at his Elmendorf Farm in Lexington, Kentucky. He was trained by Morris H. Dixon.

== Racing career ==
=== 1944: two-year-old season ===
At age two, Polynesian lost his first three races, then bucked his shins.

=== 1945: three-year-old season ===
Back in training at age three, Polynesian won five of his next seven starts, one of which was a division of the Sagamore Stakes. In the Experimental Free Handicap he came in third to Jeep and Greek Warrior, and fourth in a division of the Wood Memorial won by Hoop Jr. He skipped the Kentucky Derby (won by Hoop Jr.), instead competing in one mile Withers Stakes where he defeated Pavot. Polynesian then took the mile and three sixteenths second leg of the U.S. Triple Crown series, the Preakness Stakes, in a front running victory. Because of its demanding one and a half miles, Polynesian was not entered in the third leg of the Triple Crown, the Belmont Stakes. Later that year he won the Saranac Handicap.

=== Later career ===
Polynesian developed into a champion sprinter, winning a number of important sprint races in 1946 and in 1947 and was named the U.S. Champion Sprint Horse. In his last year of racing, he went through a streak of five wins, 10 seconds, and 10 thirds.

== Stud career ==
Retired to stud duty, Polynesian sired 37 stakes winners including one of the greatest horses in American racing history, Native Dancer. Some of Polynesian's offspring were:

Foaled	Name	Sex	Major Wins/Achievements
1950	Imbros	Stallion	
1950	Native Dancer	Stallion	Preakness Stakes, Belmont Stakes
1951	Banquet Bell	Mare	Dam of Chateaugay and Primonetta
1953	Polly's Jet	Stallion	
1954	Alanesian	Mare	Dam of Boldnesian
1954	Barbizon	Stallion	American Champion Two-Year-Old Colt (1956)

At age seventeen, Polynesian Died on December 29, 1959, from colic and was buried at Gallaher Farm in Lexington, Kentucky.

== Breeding ==
Pedigree of Polynesian
Sire Unbreakable black 1935	Sickle brown 1924	Phalaris	Polymelus
Sire Unbreakable black 1935	Sickle brown 1924	Phalaris	Bromus
Sire Unbreakable black 1935	Sickle brown 1924	Selene	Chaucer
Sire Unbreakable black 1935	Sickle brown 1924	Selene	Serenissima
Sire Unbreakable black 1935	Blue Grass bay 1917	Prince Palatine	Persimmon
Sire Unbreakable black 1935	Blue Grass bay 1917	Prince Palatine	Lady Lightfoot
Sire Unbreakable black 1935	Blue Grass bay 1917	Hour Glass	Rock Sand
Sire Unbreakable black 1935	Blue Grass bay 1917	Hour Glass	Hautesse
Dam Black Polly bay 1936	Polymelian ch. 1914	Polymelus	Cyllene
Dam Black Polly bay 1936	Polymelian ch. 1914	Polymelus	Maid Marian
Dam Black Polly bay 1936	Polymelian ch. 1914	Pasquita	Sundridge
Dam Black Polly bay 1936	Polymelian ch. 1914	Pasquita	Pasquil
Dam Black Polly bay 1936	Black Queen drk.brn. 1930	Pompey	Sun Briar
Dam Black Polly bay 1936	Black Queen drk.brn. 1930	Pompey	Cleopatra
Dam Black Polly bay 1936	Black Queen drk.brn. 1930	Black Maria	Black Toney
Dam Black Polly bay 1936	Black Queen drk.brn. 1930	Black Maria	Bird Loose (Family 14-a)
