= Étienne Pollet =

Belgian rower

Personal information
- Nationality: Belgian
- Born: 30 April 1944 (age 80); Ostend, Belgium

Sport
- Sport: Rowing

Étienne Pollet (born 30 April 1944) is a Belgian rower. He competed in the men's coxed pair event at the 1960 Summer Olympics.
