= Lamont Library =

Harvard undergraduate library

Coordinates: 42.37277°N 71.11548°W

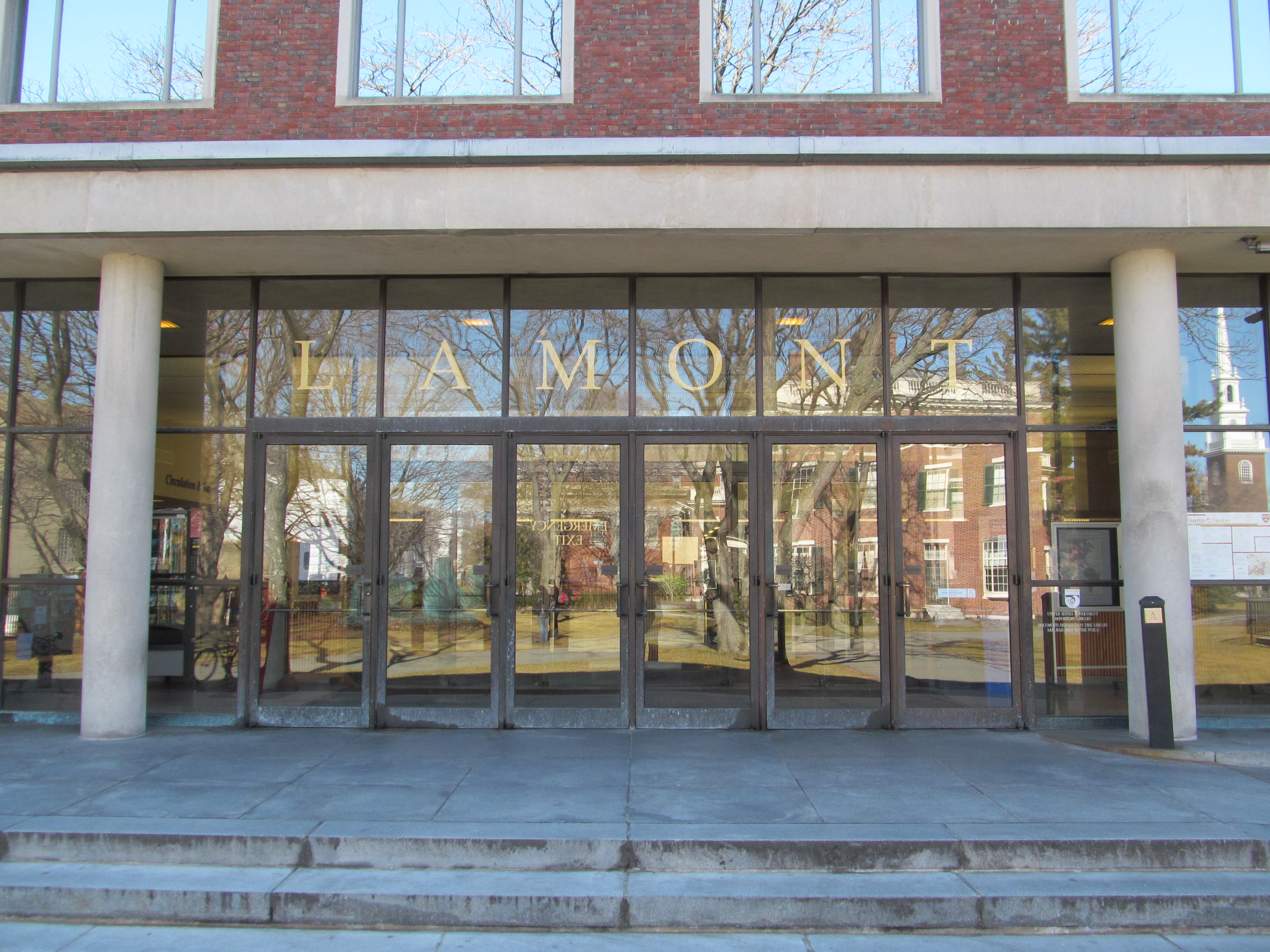
Entrance facing Loeb House

Lamont Library, in the southeast corner of Harvard Yard in Cambridge, Massachusetts, houses the Harvard Library's primary undergraduate collection in humanities and social sciences. It was the first library in the United States specifically planned to serve undergraduates. Women (that is, Radcliffe College students) were admitted beginning in 1967.

== Overview ==
Lamont was built as part of a program to address dwindling stack space, and patron overcrowding, at Widener Library. Keyes D. Metcalf, Librarian of Harvard College and Director of the Harvard University Library from 1937 to 1955, planned the building with Boston architect Henry R. Shepley. Opened in 1949, it is named for its principal donor, Harvard alumnus Thomas W. Lamont.

Lamont's general collection of 200,000 volumes began with transfers from Widener, the Boylston Hall reserve-book collections, and the Harvard Union Reading Room. A modified Dewey classification scheme was used, and the main spaces included capacious open-shelf alcoves for browsing, study, and research. The Library of Congress Classification system was adopted in the 1970s.

After Littauer Library closed in 2007, Lamont became the home library for HCL's former Social Sciences Program. Four units of the Social Sciences Program‍—‌Documents Services, Microform Services, Numeric Data Services, and Environmental Information Services‍—‌were combined with Lamont Reference Services. Lamont houses the College Library's major research collections in government documents and microform collections across all disciplines.
