= William Coolidge Lane =

American librarian (1859–1931)

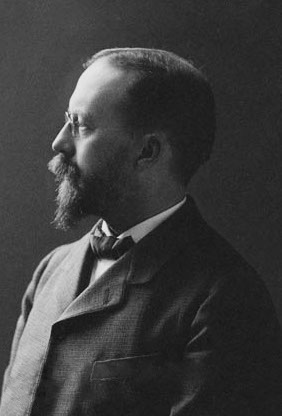
- Lane, circa 1915

Librarian of Harvard University
- In office 1898–1928
- Preceded by: Justin Winsor
- Succeeded by: Alfred Claghorn Potter

President of the American Library Association
- In office 1898–1899
- Preceded by: Herbert Putnam
- Succeeded by: Reuben Gold Thwaites

Personal details
- Born: July 29, 1859 Newtonville, Massachusetts, U.S.
- Died: March 18, 1931 (aged 71) Cambridge, Massachusetts, U.S.
- Education: Harvard University
- Occupation: Librarian; author

William Coolidge Lane (July 29, 1859 – March 18, 1931) was an American librarian and historian. He served for over 45 years in the Harvard Library at Harvard University in Cambridge, Massachusetts.

== Early life and education ==
Lane was born in Newtonville, Massachusetts to William Homer Lane and Caroline Coolidge Lane. His father was a descendant of Anne Hutchinson of the Massachusetts Bay Colony, and his mother was a descendant of John Coolidge of Watertown, Massachusetts, and John Alden and Priscilla Alden of the Plymouth Colony.

Lane entered Harvard University as a student in 1877, moving with his mother to Cambridge, Massachusetts. He was a member of Phi Beta Kappa and graduated in 1881. Upon his retirement in 1928, Lane was awarded an honorary A.M. by Harvard.

In 1903, Lane married Bertha Palmer, and they had two daughters, Margaret Lane and Rosamond Lane. Margaret became a librarian in the public schools in Poughkeepsie, New York, and Rosamond married Milton E. Lord, a Harvard University graduate of 1919, Director of the Boston Public Library, and president of the American Library Association. Lane died of a heart attack at his home in Cambridge on March 18, 1931.

== Career ==
=== Harvard University ===
Upon graduation from Harvard University in 1881, Lane began working in the Ordering Department at the Harvard College Library, located in Gore Hall. In 1882, he was made Superintendent of the Cataloging Department, in 1884 he was named Assistant in charge of the Harvard College Library's catalog, and in 1887 he was appointed Assistant Librarian under Librarian Justin Winsor. In 1893 Lane left the Harvard College Library to serve as Librarian of the Boston Athenaeum, but he was called back to Harvard after Justin Winsor's death in 1897, and named Librarian at Harvard in 1898.

As Librarian at Harvard, Lane grew the number of volumes in the Library from 200,000 to nearly 2,500,000, and refined Harvard's cataloging and classification systems. Lane also oversaw the physical transfer of the entire Library from Gore Hall to the Harry Elkins Widener Memorial Library, opened in 1915, and assisted in the planning and furnishing of the building.

Lane retired in 1928 and was named Librarian Emeritus. Upon his death in 1931, Harvard President Lowell said of him, "[Lane] was a librarian of Harvard for 30 years, to whom scholars are grateful for the accessibility of its vast collections."

=== Professional activities ===
In his professional life, Lane served as president of the American Library Association from 1898 to 1899. Prior to his term as president, Lane served as secretary and treasurer for fourteen years and also served as chairman of its publishing board. He was also a charter member of the Massachusetts Library Club, and served as president for the term 1891–92.

He was president of the Bibliographical Society of America from 1904 to 1909. Lane was also a charter member of the Cambridge Historical Society, and a member of the New England College Librarians, the American Academy of Arts and Sciences, the Massachusetts Historical Society, and the Dante Society, among others.

Lane was also active on a number of committees at Harvard, and was especially instrumental in promoting the Memorial Society for Harvard men in World War I. He was active in the Union and the Alumni Signet Society, and was a respected scholar of Harvard history. From 1887 to 1891, he was also a lecturer at the Columbia College School of Library Economy.

=== Librarian of Congress campaign ===
Lane used his sphere of influence as Harvard librarian and American Library Association president when, in 1899, he spearheaded a campaign to appoint the first professional librarian, Herbert Putnam, to the position of Librarian of Congress. The position had previously been filled by politicians and journalists.

In early January 1899, Librarian of Congress John Russell Young died unexpectedly, and President William McKinley sought a new candidate for the position. Massachusetts Representative Samuel J. Barrows was the leading candidate, though he had no experience as a librarian. Lane wrote to a number of congressional contacts urging the importance of appointing a librarian to the position, and in his capacity as President of ALA, collected signatures from the ALA Council (twenty members elected to an advisory board) to send to President McKinley. From a number of recommendations of suitable candidates for the job submitted by ALA members, Lane and the Council settled on Herbert Putnam, then Librarian at the Boston Public Library.

Through letters to and meetings with members of Congress and the President himself, editorials in local papers, and rallying the support of librarians throughout the country, Lane pressed Putnam's somewhat reluctant candidacy. Barrows initially said he would not stand in opposition to a professional librarian backed by ALA, but matters became complicated when, in an error of manners, Barrows felt Putnam had at one point declined the nomination and made it clear he felt it dishonorable for Putnam to enter the "race" at a later stage. Putnam was embarrassed by this and formally declined President McKinley's nomination, but perhaps due to Lane's relentless campaigning and the attention brought to the issue, the Senate failed to confirm Barrows on the basis of his not being a librarian. Putnam subsequently felt able to renew his candidacy, and was appointed to the position of Librarian of Congress in March 1899. He took office that December, and held the position for forty years.

== Publications ==
A bibliography of Lane's writings appears in Harvard Library Notes Number 21.

- The treatment of books according to the amount of their use (reprinted from Proceedings of American library association, 1903)
- Gore Hall : the library of Harvard College, 1838–1913. (Harvard University, 1917)
- The Harry Elkins Widener memorial library. (Harvard Alumni Bulletin, 1915)
- Notes on special collections in American libraries. (1892)
- The Dante collections in the Harvard College and Boston Public Libraries. (1890)
- Justin Winsor, librarian and historian, 1831–1897. A paper read before the Massachusetts library club, December 16, 1897 (1898)

Educational offices
Preceded by Justin Winsor	Librarian of Harvard University; 1898–1928	Succeeded by Alfred Claghorn Potter
Non-profit organization positions
Preceded by Herbert Putnam	President of the American Library Association; 1898–1899	Succeeded by Reuben Gold Thwaites
