= Fred Norris Robinson =

American academic

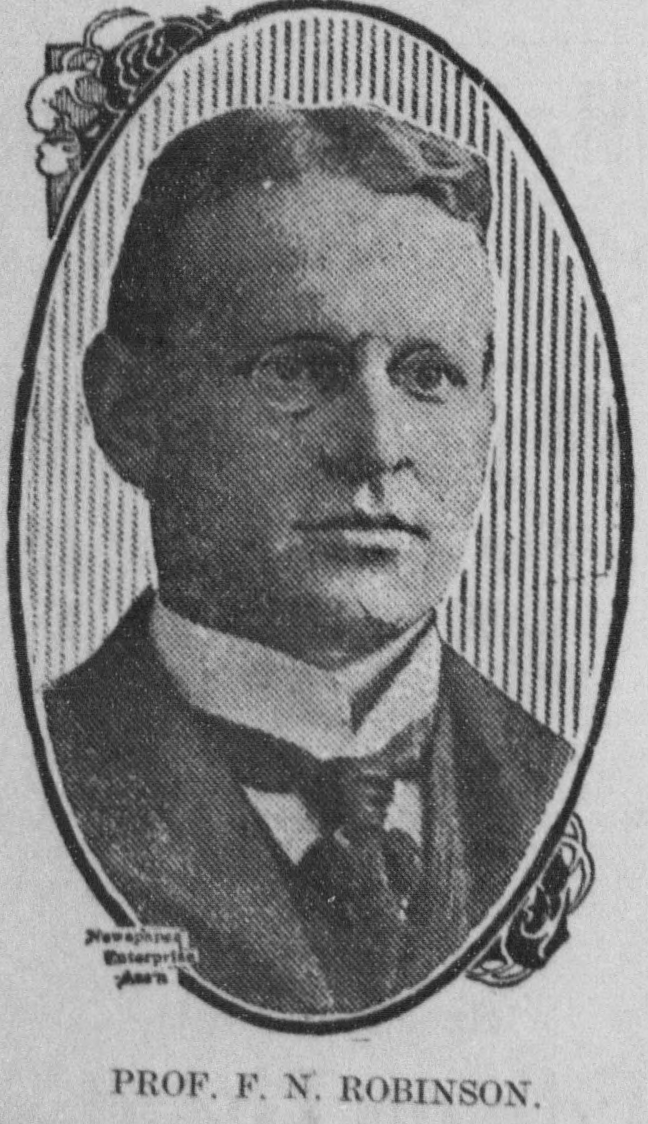
Fred Norris Robinson in 1904

Fred Norris Robinson (April 4, 1871 – July 21, 1966), professionally known as F. N. Robinson, was an eminent American Celticist and scholar of Geoffrey Chaucer.

== Biography ==
Robinson received his B.A. (1891), M.A. (1892), and PhD (1894) from Harvard University, working with the eminent medievalists Francis James Child and George Lyman Kittredge. In 1936, after appointments at Harvard as instructor (1894), assistant professor (1902), and professor (1906), he succeeded his thesis adviser, Kittredge, as Gurney Professor of English. In 1895, he spent a year abroad at the University of Freiburg, Germany, working with Rudolph Turneysen, one of the founders of Celtic Philology. He received honorary doctorates from the National University of Ireland and the University of Dublin, was an honorary member of the Royal Irish Academy and also the Consultative Committee of the Irish Texts Society. He was elected to the American Academy of Arts and Sciences in 1911 and the American Philosophical Society in 1944.

== Scholarly achievements ==
Robinson's main scholarly achievement was the publication, after 29 years of preparatory work, of the most influential edition of The Works of Geoffrey Chaucer (1933; second edition, 1957, published under slightly different titles). The 1987 Riverside Chaucer, while revised and re-edited by several colleagues, is greatly indebted to his work. These three editions have facilitated more students' first contact with the medieval author than any other editions of Chaucer. Moreover, Robinson's work as editor contributed to the move of Chaucer studies from Europe to North America.

Robinson essentially established Celtic Studies in the United States. From 1896 at Harvard, he taught the US's first classes in Irish and continued them until the chair in Celtic Studies was established there. He amassed a voluminous collection of books related to Irish, Welsh, Scottish Gaelic, Cornish, Breton and Manx language and literature, which he bequeathed to Harvard University's Widener Library. As a result, the university has the world's most comprehensive collection of works in the Celtic Studies field.

== Select publications ==
- The Complete Works of Geoffrey Chaucer, ed. F.N. Robinson (Boston and New York: Houghton Mifflin; Oxford: Oxford University Press, 1933).
- The Works of Geoffrey Chaucer, ed. F.N. Robinson (Boston: Houghton Mifflin, 1957).

== Literature ==
- Daniel Donoghue, “The History of English Medieval Studies at Harvard University,” Medieval English Newsletter 28 (June 1993): 1–3.
- Richard Utz, “The Colony Writes Back: F.N. Robinson’s Complete Works of Geoffrey Chaucer (1933) and the Translatio of Chaucer Studies to the United States.” Studies in Medievalism 19 (2010): 160-203.
