= Angus Snead Macdonald =

American architect and businessman

- Born: November 7, 1883; Louisville
- Died: February 21, 1961 (aged 77)

Angus Snead Macdonald (1883–1961) was an American architect and businessman; from 1915 to 1952 the president of Snead and Company. This company, based in Louisville, Kentucky, manufactured the steel-frame book stacks found in libraries all over the world in the beginning of the 20th century including the Washington, DC Public Library and Harvard's Widener Library. He led Snead and Company to revolutionize and standardize library book stacks.

== Innovations in library shelving ==
With the success of the public library movement of the mid-19th century came the rapid expansion of library construction in the United States. Macdonald took advantage of this expansion to revolutionize a number of library features. In 1915 Snead standardized the length of a book shelf to three feet in order to reduce cost and create interchangeable parts. The company also standardized the stack range spacing to four feet six inches. In 1930 the company developed a standardized lighting system that reflected light evenly to all parts of the stacks. In 1950, when developing for the Midwest Inter-Library Center, Snead and Company developed the first compact shelving units. These developments kept pace with Snead's ideal to provide libraries that "stressed flexibility, economy, informational comfort, and a reliance on artificial illumination and ventilation."

The most important influences that Macdonald has had on libraries have been his architectural designs advocating open stacks in the 1930s, and his company’s modular architecture in the 1950s. The Snead Company's production of public and academic libraries in the beginning of the 20th century provided the framework for open stack libraries. The company's focus on providing book stacks that could also be modified to accommodate card catalogues or reading spaces helped the expanding use of public libraries following World War II. The concept of modular libraries not only signaled the financial demise of Snead and Company, but also the birth of the modern library form. Composed of nine by nine by eight foot sections or "modules", this concept, combined with the production of light-weight, adjustable shelving, revolutionized library planning. Macdonald and the company he headed were integral in the move of the American library system from one of closed, structural stacks, to open stacks that emphasize adjustability which are still in use today.
