= Library stack =

Storage area for books in a library

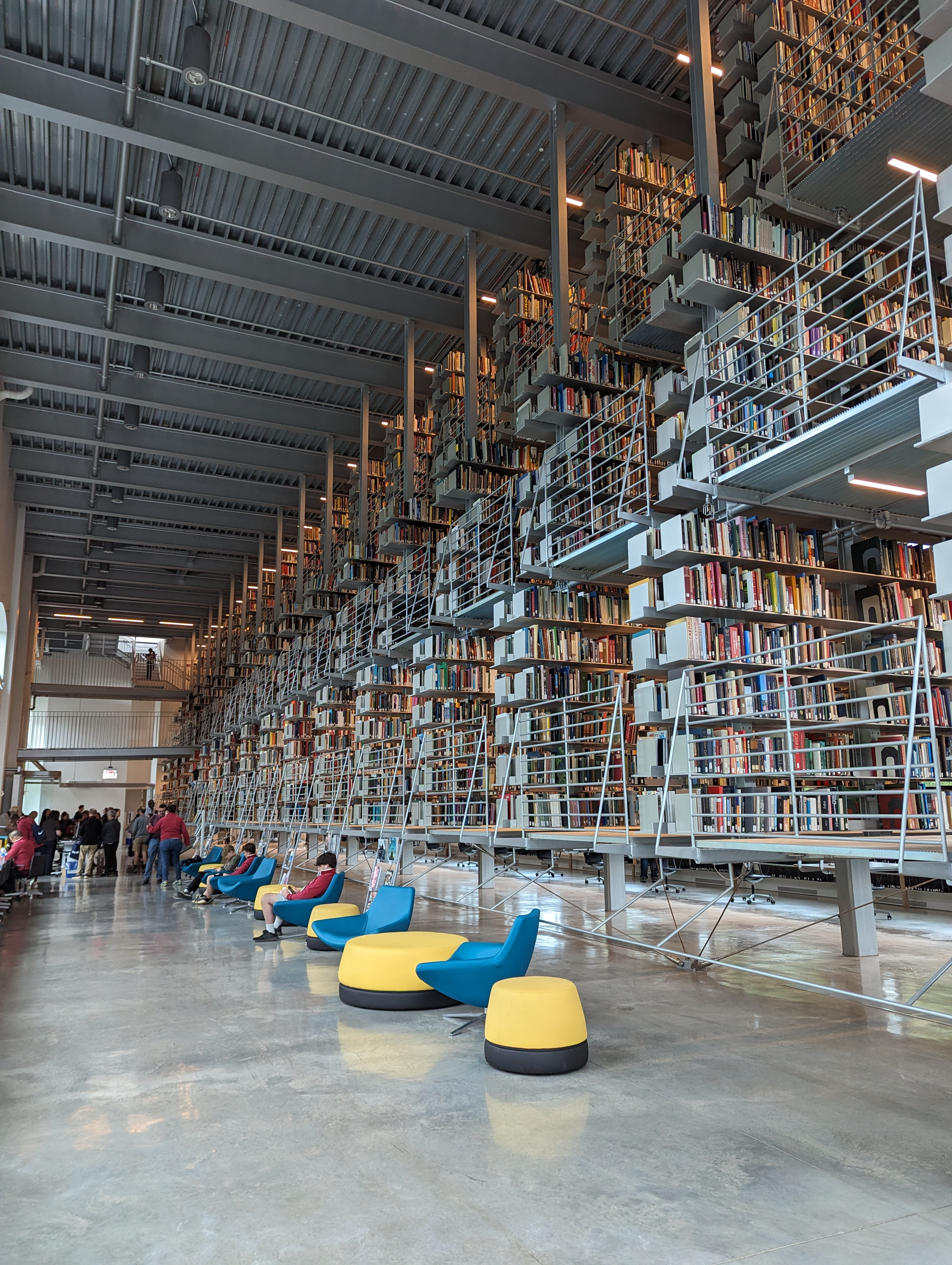
The stacks of the Mui Ho Fine Arts Library at Cornell University

In library science and architecture, a stack or bookstack (often referred to as a library building's stacks) is a book storage area, as opposed to a reading area. More specifically, this term refers to a narrow-aisled, multilevel system of iron or steel shelving that evolved in the 19th century to meet increasing demands for storage space. An "open-stack" library allows its patrons to enter the stacks to browse for themselves; "closed stacks" means library staff retrieve books for patrons on request.

Stacks may also use a mobile shelving system.

== Early development ==
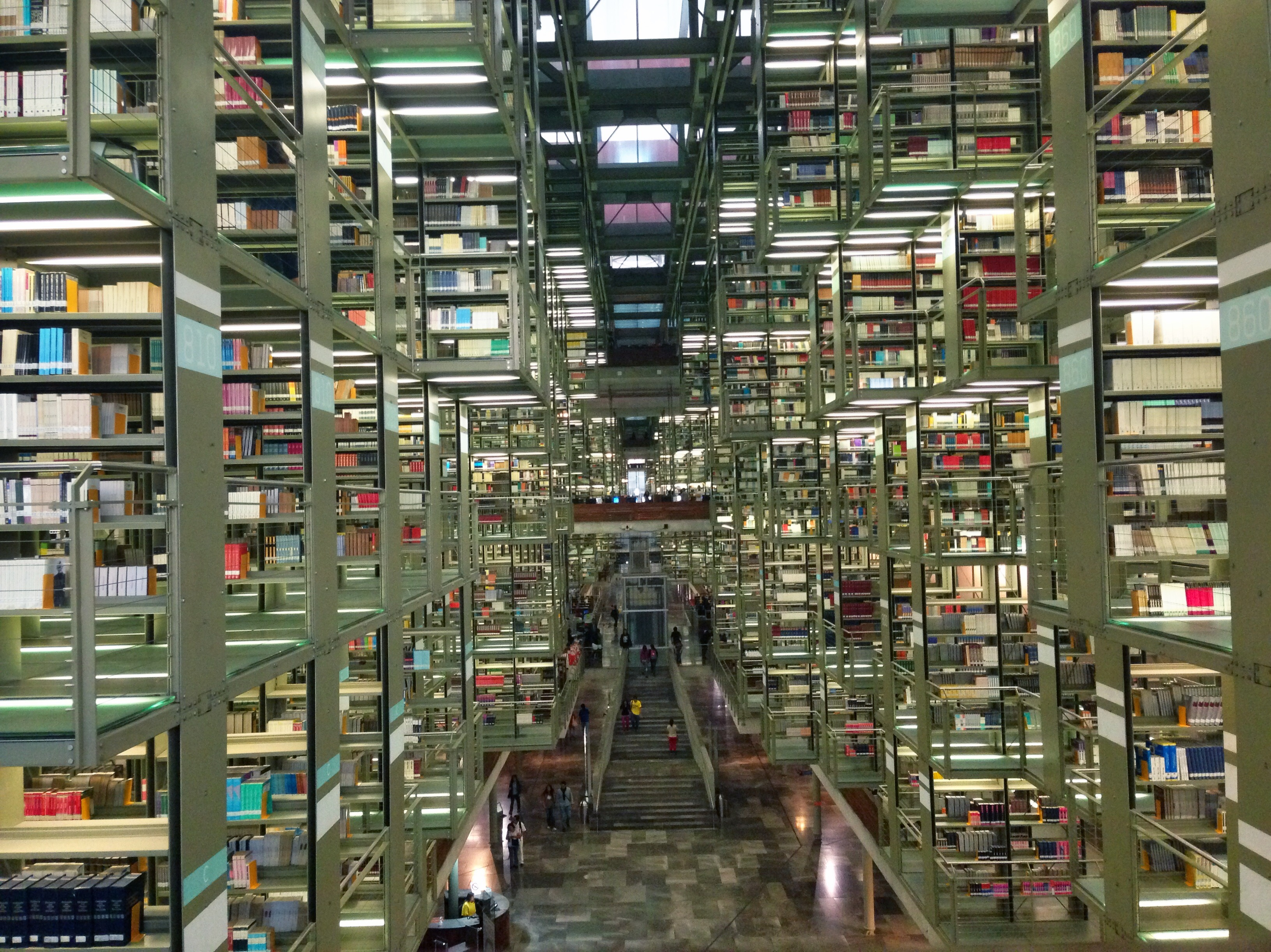
Contemporary, cantilevered stacks at the Biblioteca Vasconcelos, Mexico City

French architect Henri Labrouste, shortly after making pioneering use of iron in the Bibliotheque Sainte-Genevieve of 1850, created a four-story iron stack for the Bibliothèque nationale de France. In 1857, multilevel stacks with grated iron floors were installed in the British Library. In 1876, William R. Ware designed a stack for Gore Hall at Harvard University. In contrast to the structural relationship found in most buildings, the floors of these bookstacks did not support the shelving, but rather the reverse, the floors being attached to, and supported by, the shelving framework. Even the load of the building's roof, and of any non-shelving spaces above the stacks (such as offices), may be transmitted to the building's foundation through the shelving system itself. The building's external walls act as an envelope but provide no significant structural support.

== Library of Congress and the Snead system ==
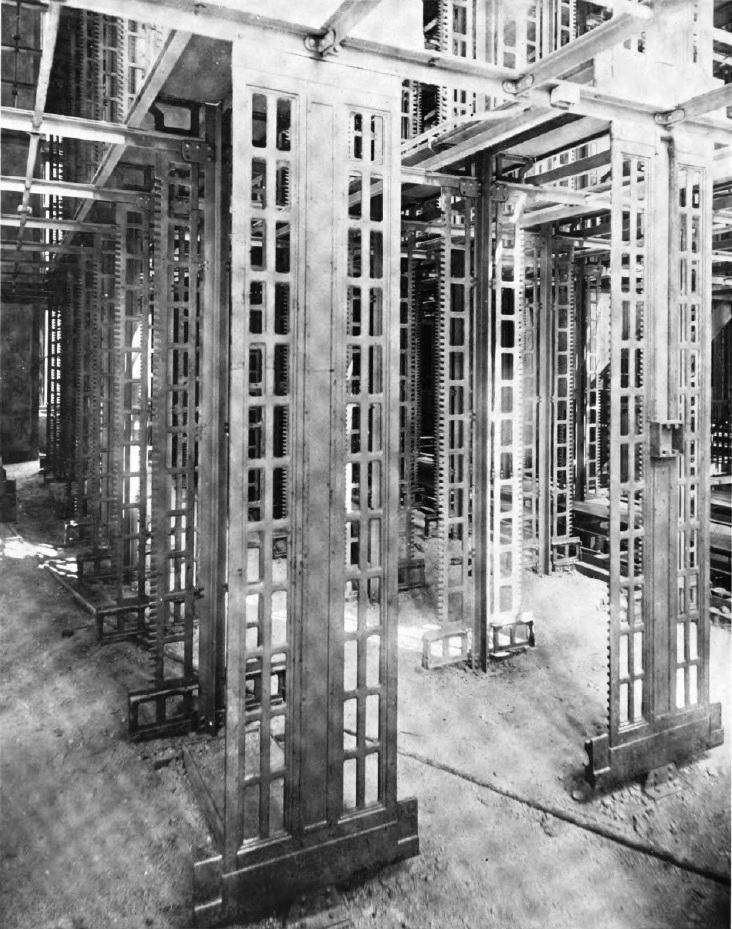
The lowest of Widener Library's ten stack levels during construction. Because floor panels had not yet been installed, the stack level above is also visible.

The Thomas Jefferson Building of the Library of Congress was completed in 1897. This is where this type of book storage was first used. The engineer in charge of construction was Bernard Richardson Green. He made a number of alterations to the Gore Hall design, including the use of all-metal shelving. The contract was won by the Snead and Company Ironworks, which went on to install its standardized design in libraries around the country. Notable examples are the Widener Library at Harvard and the seven level stack supporting the Rose Reading Room of the New York Public Library.

The Library of Congress bookstacks were designed and patented by Green. Although the structure was of cast iron, the shelves were made from strips of thin U section steel, designed to be as light as an equivalent pine shelf. The top surface of the U section was ground, polished and 'lacquered' (the constituents of the lacquer are not known). Green designed the stacks to be modular, able to be erected several stories high as a single freestanding structural entity incorporating staircases and floors, and even capable of supporting a roof structure. He designed the shelves so that they could adjust to book sizes using a simple lug system without the need for any bolts or fixings. Although the bookstacks were decorated and very simply embellished, they are of machine-age industrial design.

== Open versus closed stacks ==
In the design and administration of any library, a key decision is whether its stacks will be open or closed. In an open-stack library, patrons are free to enter the stacks to browse the collection and retrieve items that interest them. In a closed-stack library, only library staff are allowed in the stacks; patrons must use the catalog to identify books they want, and request that staff retrieve them. Until the late 19th century, most public libraries had closed-stack systems, but toward the end of that century open stacks increased in popularity.

A notable proponent of the open-stack system was John Cotton Dana, who became head of the Denver Public Library in 1889. The first few Carnegie libraries used the closed-stack system, but later Carnegie Libraries were designed to operate with open stacks. Angus Snead Macdonald, president of the Snead Company from 1915 to 1952, advocated the transition from closed stacks to modular, open-plan libraries.

== See also ==
- Bookcase
- Harvard Depository
