= Harvard Depository =

Harvard University's media storage facility

The Harvard Depository, in Southborough, Massachusetts, is Harvard University's large-scale storage facility for books, documents, and special media (such as film and video). Opened in 1986 and expanded several times, it holds some 45% of the 16 million items held by Harvard's libraries, as well as non-library material such as archival records.

The Massachusetts Institute of Technology also uses the facility. (Note: https://news.mit.edu/2011/harvard-mit-libraries)

== See also ==
- Harvard Library
- Library stack
- New England Deposit Library

== Sources ==
- Beyond The Stacks
- Boston Globe, "Harvard's paper cuts"
- New York Times, "Shelf Space Gone, Harvard to Disperse Collection"
- New York Times, "Harvard Law Library Readies Trove of Decisions for Digital Age"
- New York Times, "Three Packed Libraries Seek Storage Space in New Jersey"
- History and design
- +
