= Gore Hall =

Demolished building of Harvard University

Coordinates: 42.3738°N 71.1164°W

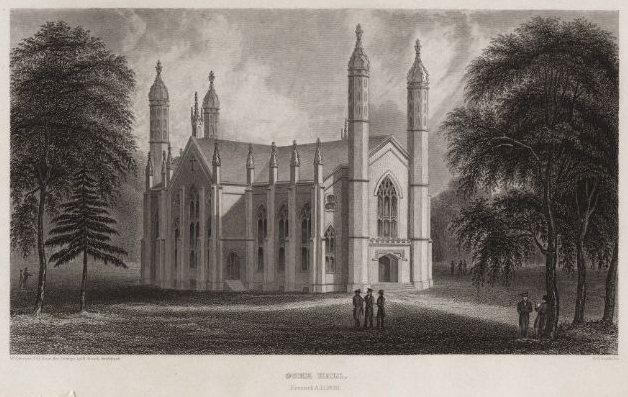
An 1840 engraving by George Girdler Smith

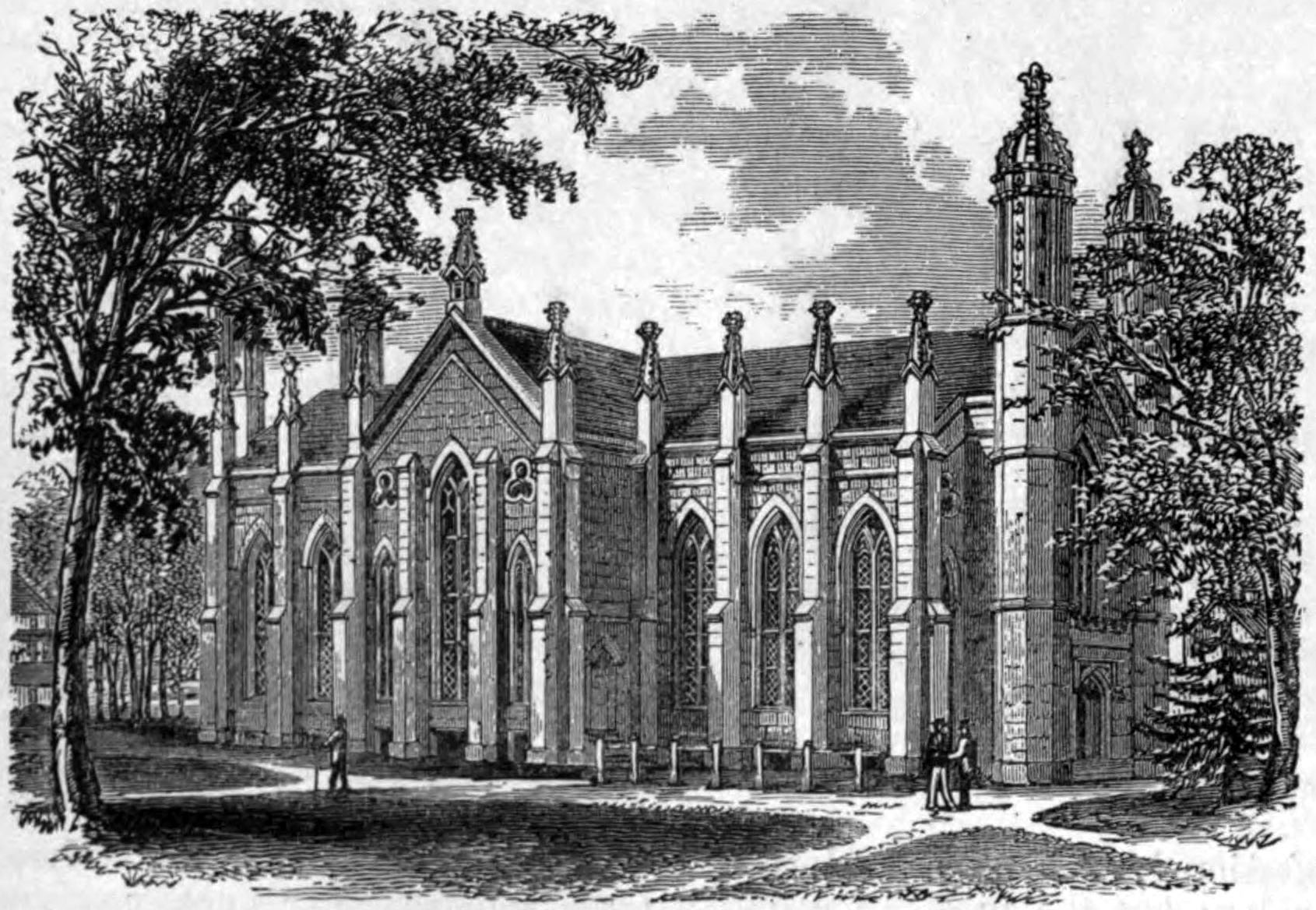
An 1879 woodcut from The American Cyclopædia

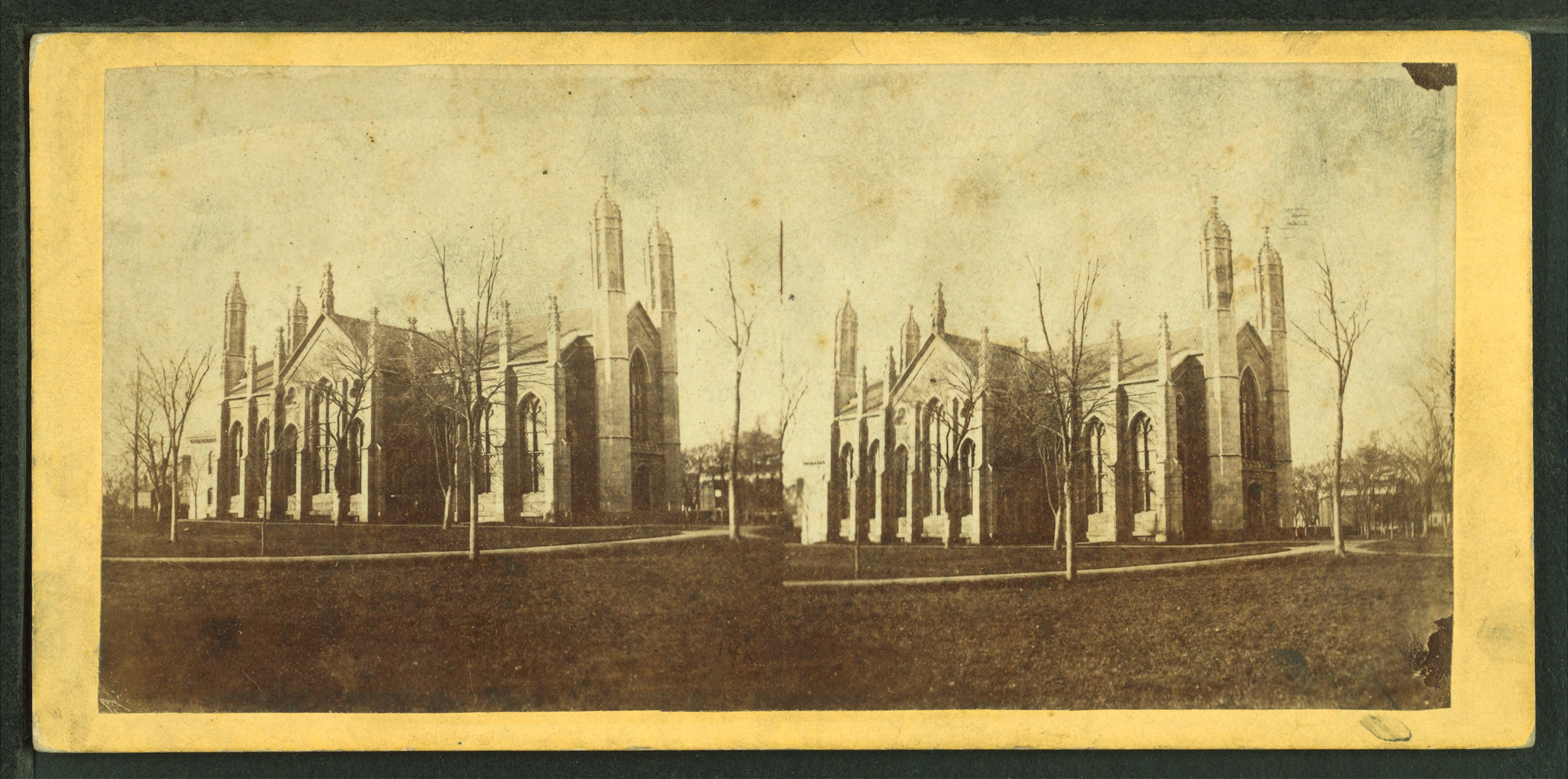

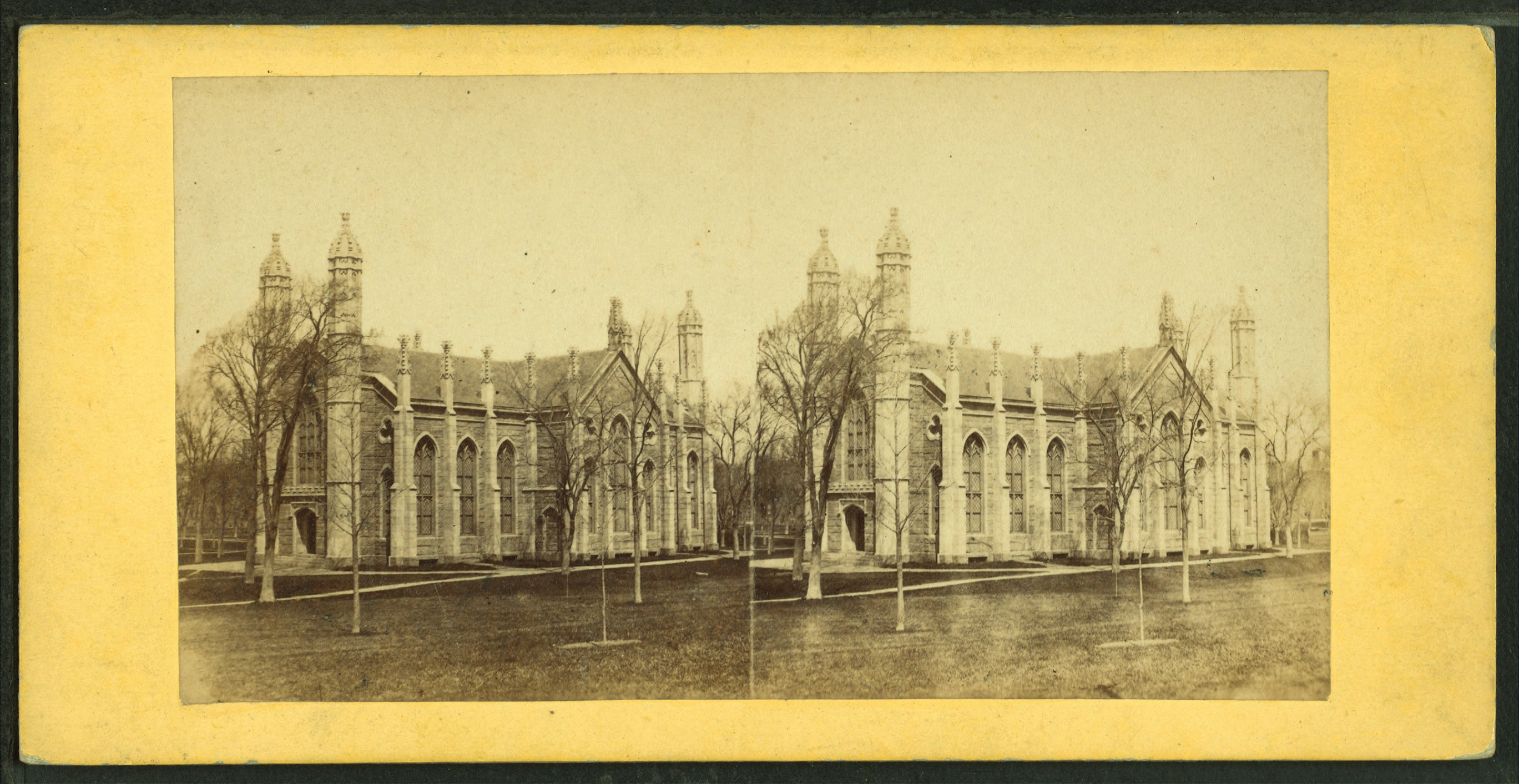
Stereoscopic image

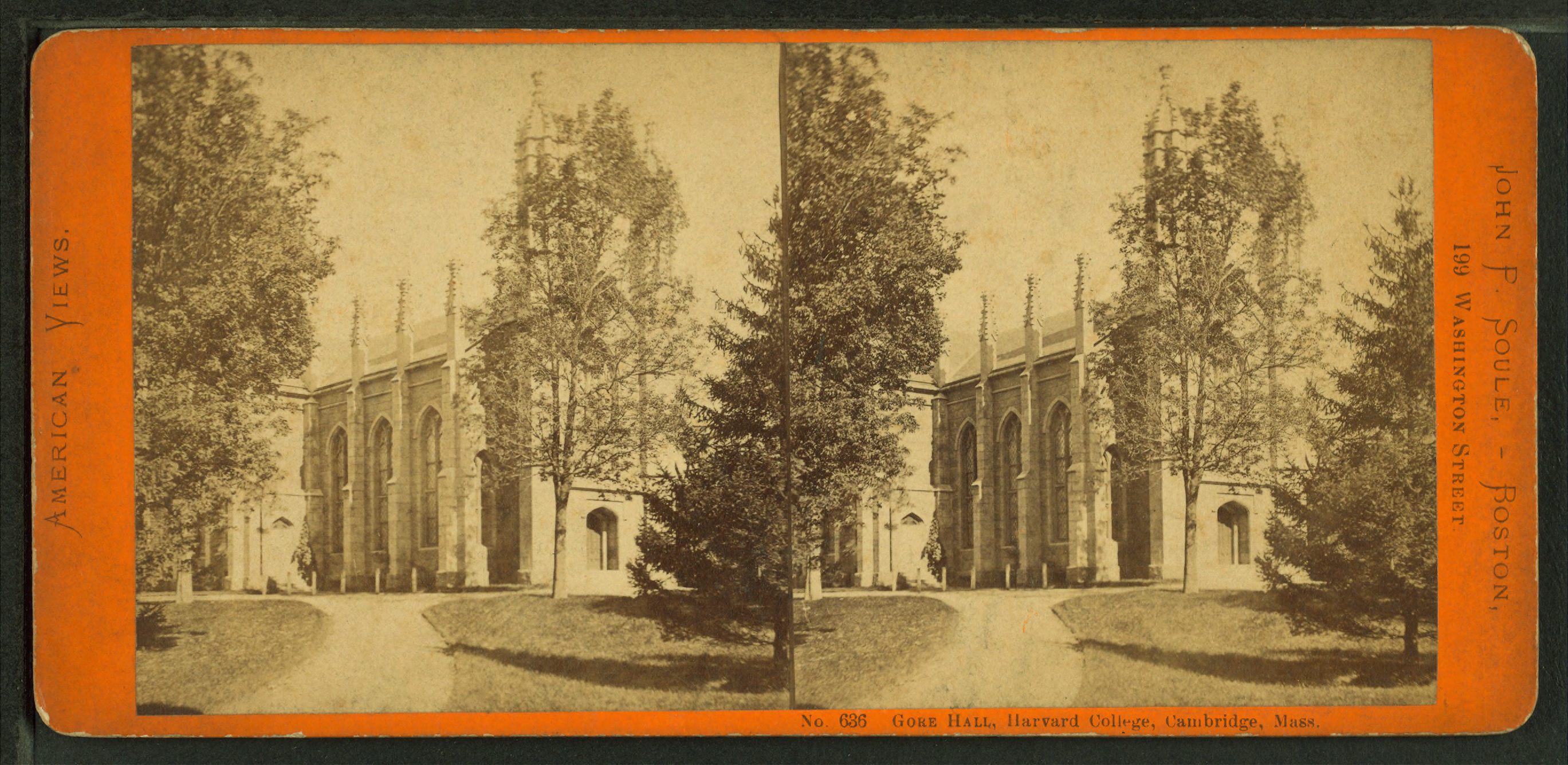
Image by John P. Soule (1827–1904)

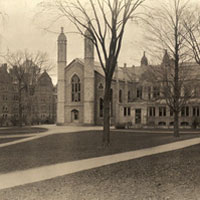
Gore Hall

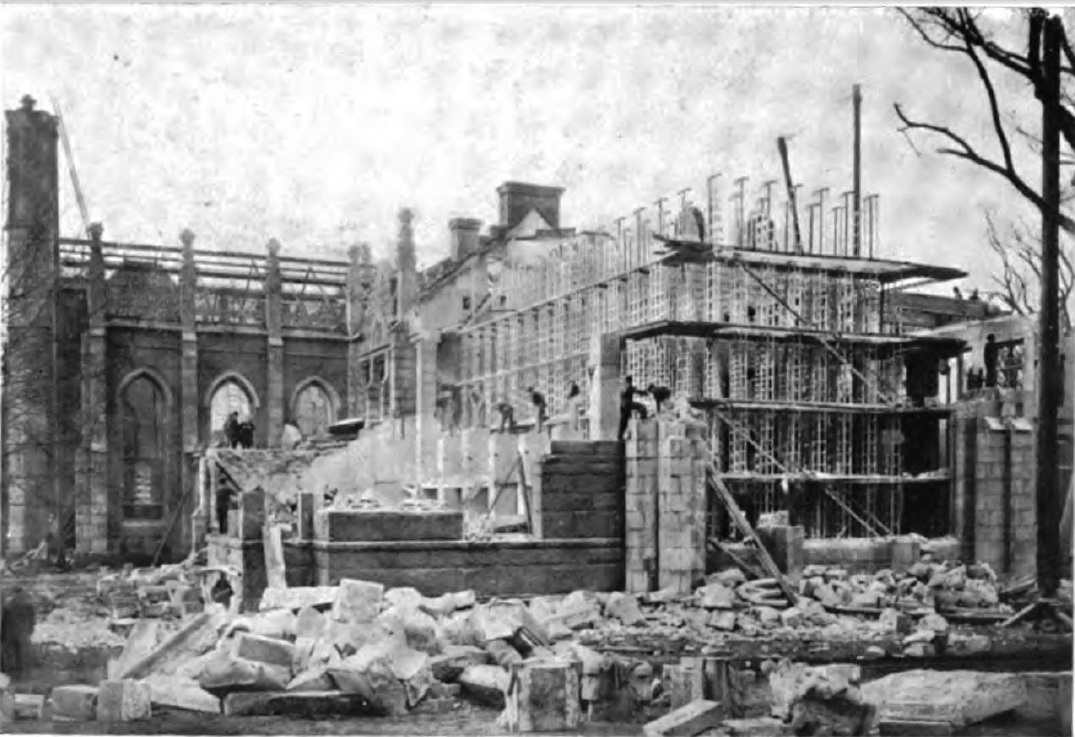
Under demolition, 1913

Seal of the City of Cambridge designed 1846 by Harvard President Edward Everett showing Gore Hall

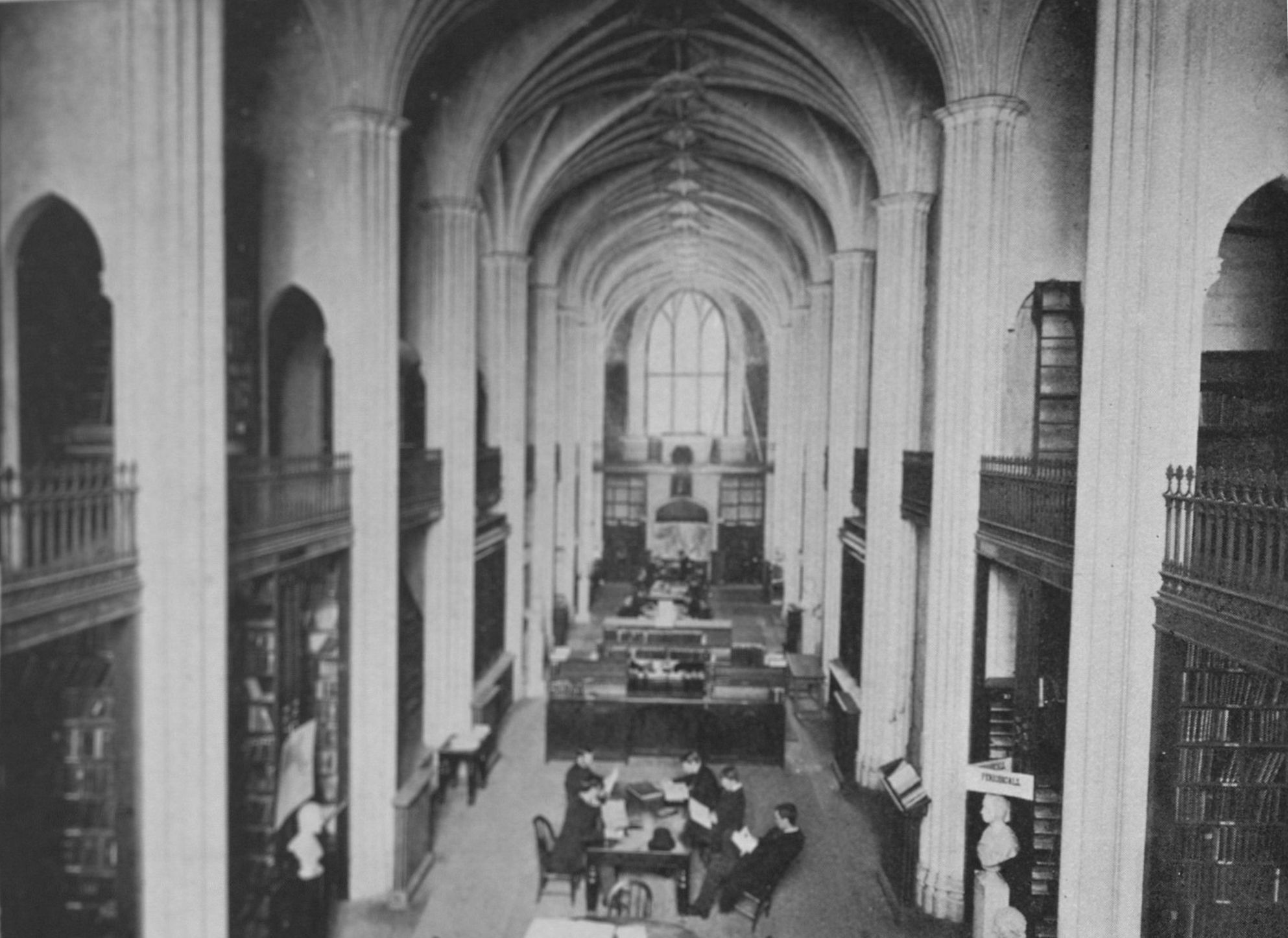

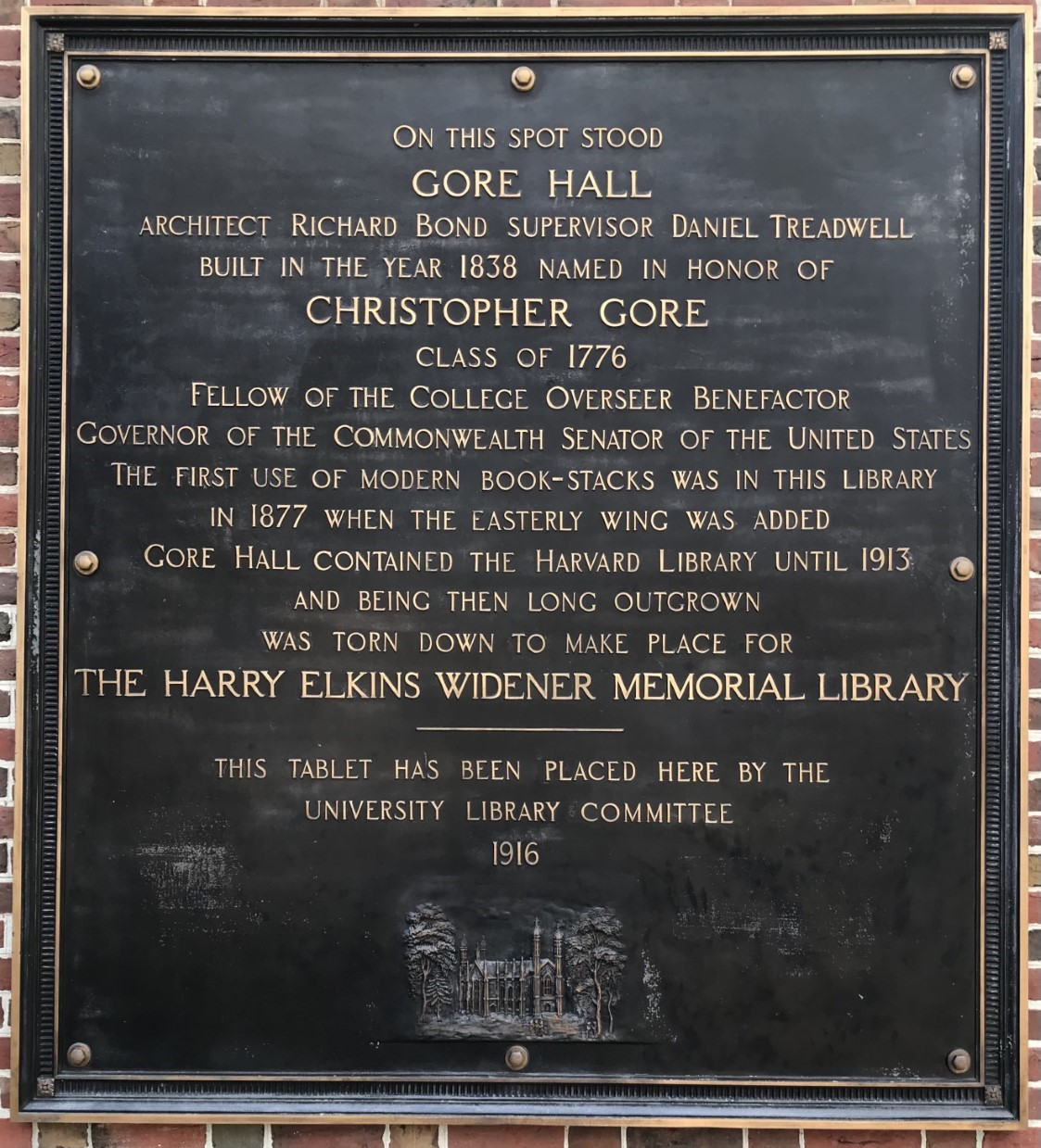
Plaque on north facade of Widener Library

Gore Hall was a historic building on the Harvard University campus in Cambridge, Massachusetts, designed by Richard Bond. Gore Hall was Harvard's first dedicated library building, a Gothic Revival structure built in 1838 of Quincy granite and named in honor of Harvard graduate and Massachusetts Governor Christopher Gore.

In 1846, Harvard President Edward Everett was asked to design a seal for the newly incorporated City of Cambridge, and he identified Gore and Washington Elm as two icons encircled by the motto Literis Antiquis Novis Institutis Decora. "It can be translated as: 'Distinguished for Classical Learning and New Institutions.'"

When the original Gore Hall was demolished in 1913 to make way for Widener Library, its name was transferred to a new Gore Hall, a freshman dormitory then under construction and now part of Winthrop House. (Note: Harvard University (1949). Education, bricks and mortar: Harvard buildings and their contribution to the advancement of learning. Harvard University. p. 29. ISBN 9780674238855.)
