= Optometry in Singapore =

Optometry is a health care profession that provides comprehensive eye and vision care, which includes the diagnosis and management of eye diseases.

== Education ==
In Singapore, optometrists undergo a three-year Diploma program in Optometry. Graduates of this program are able to register with the Optometrists and Opticians Board. They are considered pre-registered and will have to complete a one-year provisional registration, under the supervision of a fully registered optometrist, before being fully registered and able to individually practice optometry in Singapore. Provisionally registered optometrists have to complete a logbook for submission to the Optometrists & Opticians Board.

Singapore Polytechnic and Ngee Ann Polytechnic offer the three-year Diploma in Optometry program, with an average yearly intake of 80 and 40 students respectively. The course intake requirement is 5 GCE 'O' Levels with L1R2B2 aggregates of between 10 and 14, variable each year. International students with the equivalent of the local GCE 'O' Levels may also apply to study for this course. This three-year course provides optometry students with the relevant skills and knowledge of vision testing, diagnosis, and management of eye disorders and diseases, fitting and dispensing of glasses and contact lenses, as well as the business aspect of optometry.

- Singapore Polytechnic – Diploma in Optometry
- Ngee Ann Polytechnic – Diploma in Optometry

In 2002, the Singapore Optometric Association tied up with the Salus University – formerly known as Pennsylvania College of Optometry (PCO) – to provide a 3-year part-time course. This course awards the Bachelor of Science in Optometry / Master of Science in Clinical Optometry dual degree. This course is only open to Singapore qualified optometrists with the Diploma in Optometry, and graduates of overseas institution with bachelor's degrees in Optometry. This course is held in Singapore and is fully taught by the faculty from Salus University. The professors and lecturers from Salus University fly down each month, to provide intensive lectures on a particular topic for a stretch of days. Students are also required to go to Salus University Campus twice during the course, for three weeks each, to practice patient care, attend lectures, as well as present cases. This course is recognised as an additional qualification by the Optometrists and Opticians Board.

- Singapore Optometric Association
- Salus University – Center for International Studies

In 2005, Singapore Polytechnic started the Advance Diploma in Optometry program. This is a part-time course, whereby graduates of the Diploma in Optometry program 2 years of learning to upgrade their knowledge and skills in optometry. This course teaches advance diagnostic techniques and ocular diseases. The course is partly taught by the faculty in Singapore Polytechnic's Optometry faculty, and partly by the ophthalmologists from Singapore National Eye Centre. The Advanced Diploma in Optometry is also recognised by the Optometrists and Opticians Board as an additional qualification.

In 2008, the University of Manchester began offering a Bachelor of Science in Optometry honours degree programme under the Foreign Specialised Institution (FSI) initiative at Singapore Polytechnic. The course admitted Diploma in Optometry graduates from Singapore Polytechnic and Ngee Ann Polytechnic. The two-year full-time programme is delivered by optometry lecturers from the Singapore campus, as well as from the United Kingdom. In 2013, SP and the University of Manchester announced the closing of the optometry degree programme, citing inadequate enrolment and difficulties in recruiting qualified lecturers.

== Legislation ==
The Contact Lens Practitioner's Act was enacted in 1995. This was the first-ever optometry-related legislation in Singapore. This Act was enacted in response to the surge of contact lens-related complications from the rising popularity of wearing contact lenses then. After the Act was enacted, only registered Contact Lens Practitioners can practice contact lens. Qualified optometrists were also able to register to practice contact lens in Singapore.

Before the Optometrists and Opticians Act (2007), there was no legislation for optometry in Singapore. All optometrists register under the Contact Lens Practitioners Board and practice as contact lens practitioners. However, they can call themselves optometrists. The profession of optometry was not protected by law. There was no legislation that stops contact lens practitioners (who are not optometrists) or even opticians from calling themselves optometrists. Anyone could practice primary eye care, even if the person is not adequately trained or academically qualified in optometry. Due to the Contact Lens Practitioners Act, most if not all practices hire an optometrist so that they could sell contact lenses. Therefore, most optical/optometric practice would at least for a registered contact lens practitioner or an optometrist.

In 2007, the Ministry of Health reviewed the state of Optometry and Opticianry in Singapore and formed the Optometry and Opticianry Board (OOB). and all optometrists and opticians will have to register to practice their profession in the future. The Optometry and Opticianry Act took effect in January 2008, when Optometrists and Opticians are required to register with the OOB to continue to practice.
