= Cheltenham, Pennsylvania =

Unincorporated community in Pennsylvania, US

Cheltenham Cheltenham Village
- Unincorporated community Census-designated place
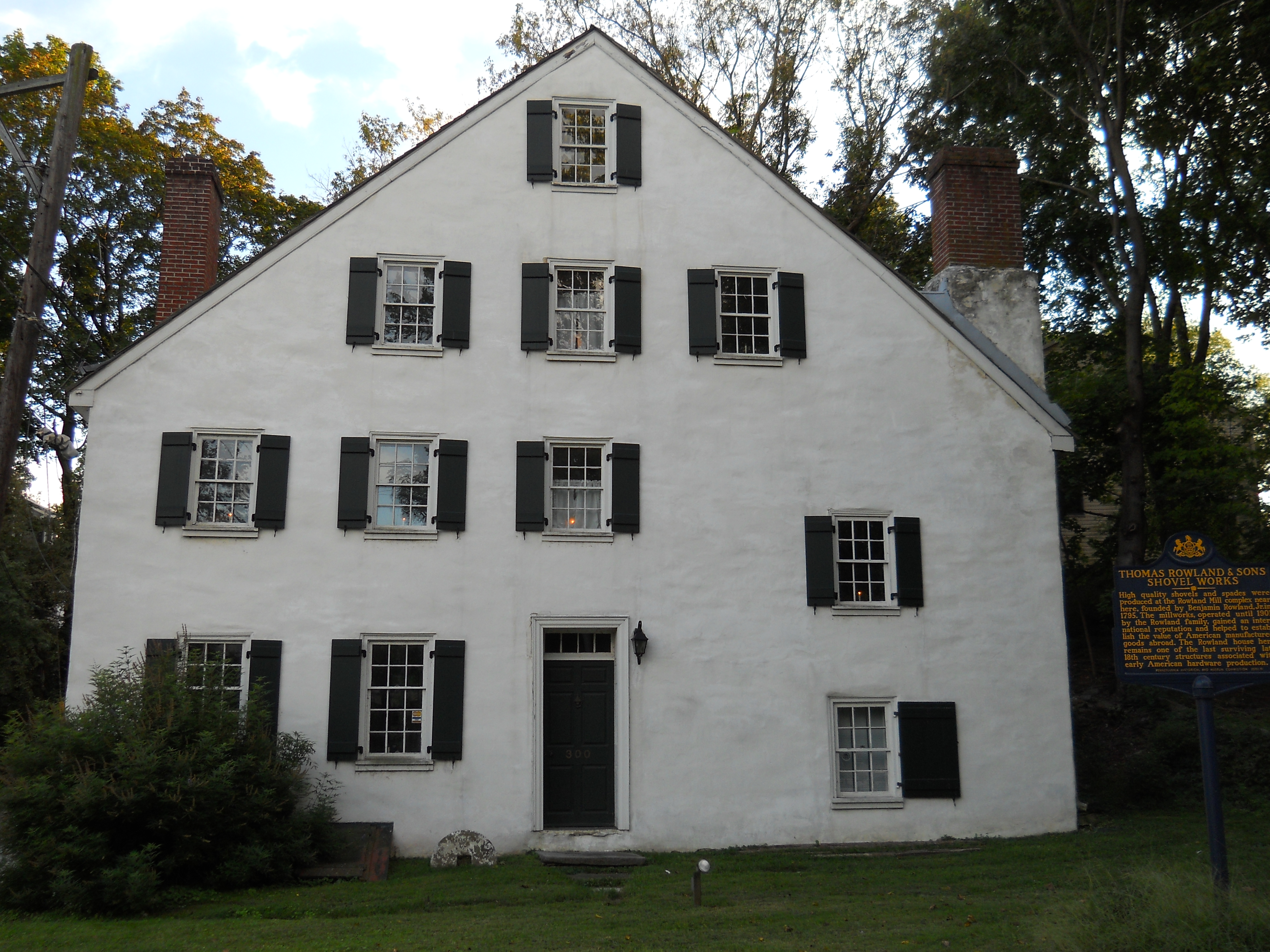
- Rowland House, c. 1774
- Motto: The Pride of the East Side
- Location of Cheltenham in Pennsylvania Cheltenham (the United States)
- Coordinates: 40°3′39″N 75°5′39″W
- Country: United States
- State: Pennsylvania
- County: Montgomery
- Township: Cheltenham

Area
  - Total: 0.707 sq mi (1.83 km^{2})
  - Land: 0.707 sq mi (1.83 km^{2})
  - Water: 0.00 sq mi (0 km^{2})
- Elevation: 125 ft (38 m)

Population (2020)
  - Total: 1,993
  - Density: 2,820/sq mi (1,090/km^{2})
- Time zone: UTC-5 (Eastern Standard Time)
  - Summer (DST): UTC-4 (Eastern Daylight Time)
- ZIP Code: 19012
- Area codes: 215, 267, and 445

Cheltenham is an unincorporated community in Cheltenham Township, Pennsylvania, United States, with a ZIP code of 19012. It is located directly over the city line (Cheltenham Avenue) of Philadelphia. It also borders Northeast Philadelphia over the Fox Chase Line on the east and over Cottman Avenue (PA 73) on the north side. The community is listed for statistical purposes as the Cheltenham Village census-designated place. As of the 2020 census it had a population of 1,993.

By the mid-1980s, many Korean Americans moved out of Logan, Philadelphia and moved into Cheltenham and other communities.

Cheltenham is represented by Madeleine Dean in the 4th Congressional District.

As of 2016, Taiwanese airline EVA Air provides a private bus service to and from John F. Kennedy International Airport in New York City for customers based in the Philadelphia area. It stops in Cheltenham.
