= Rowland House (Cheltenham, Pennsylvania) =

Historic house in Pennsylvania, United States

- U.S. National Register of Historic Places
- Pennsylvania state historical marker
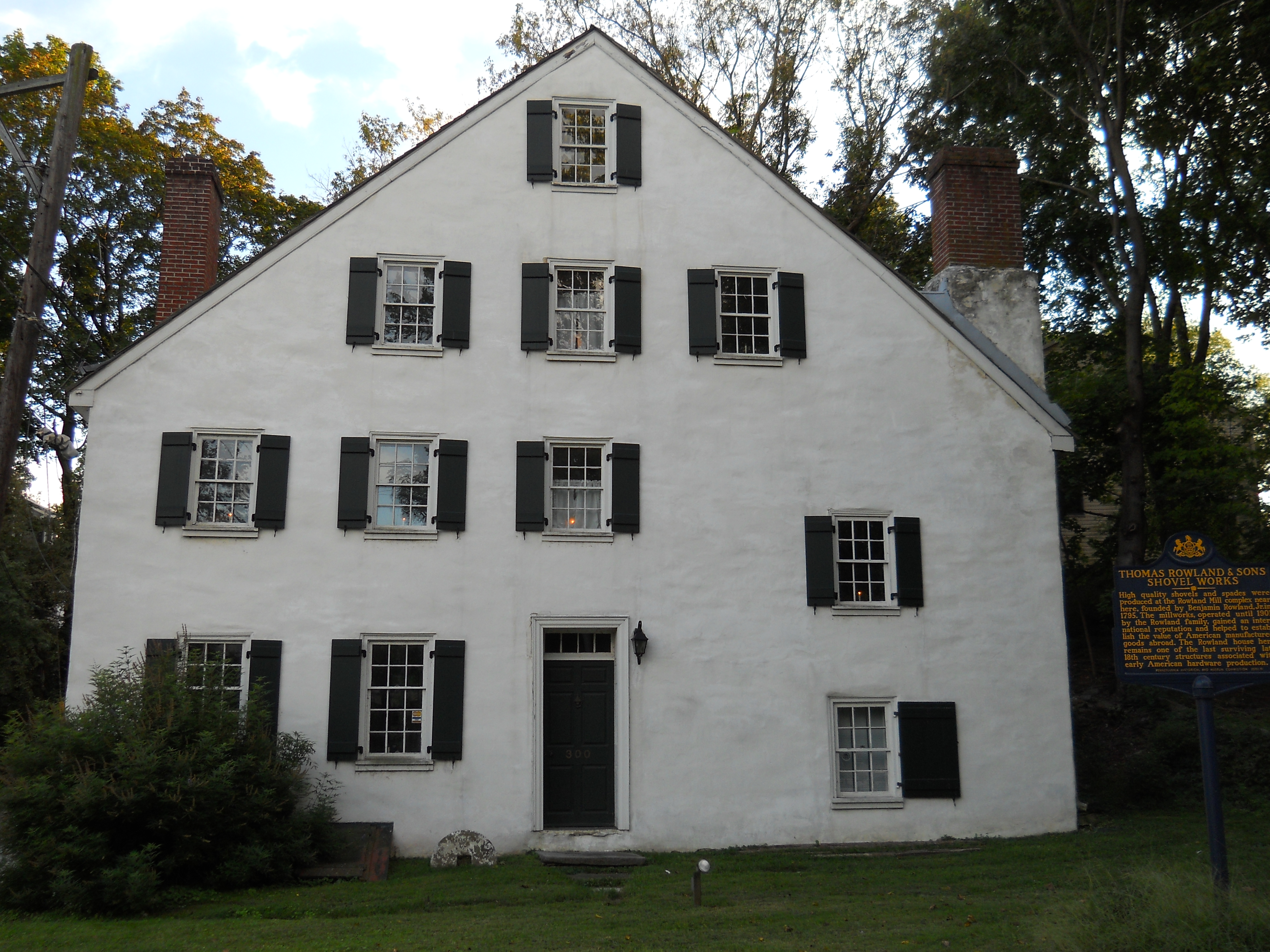
- Rowland House, September 2012

- Location within Philadelphia
- Location: 300 Ashbourne Rd, Cheltenham Township, Pennsylvania
- Coordinates: 40°3′34″N 75°5′47″W
- Area: 0.2 acres (0.081 ha)
- Built: c. 1774
- NRHP reference No.: 79002301

Significant dates
- Added to NRHP: October 25, 1979
- Designated PHMC: October 21, 2006

Rowland House, also known as the Shovel Shop, is a historic home located at Cheltenham Township, Montgomery County, Pennsylvania. It was built about 1774, expanded about 1810–1820, with additions built in the early 1900s and 1920s / 1930s. It is a 3 -story, stuccoed stone building with a steep gable roof and one-story, frame addition.

It was added to the National Register of Historic Places in 1979.
