= Cheltenham Township, Pennsylvania =

Township in Pennsylvania, US

Cheltenham Township
- Home-rule township
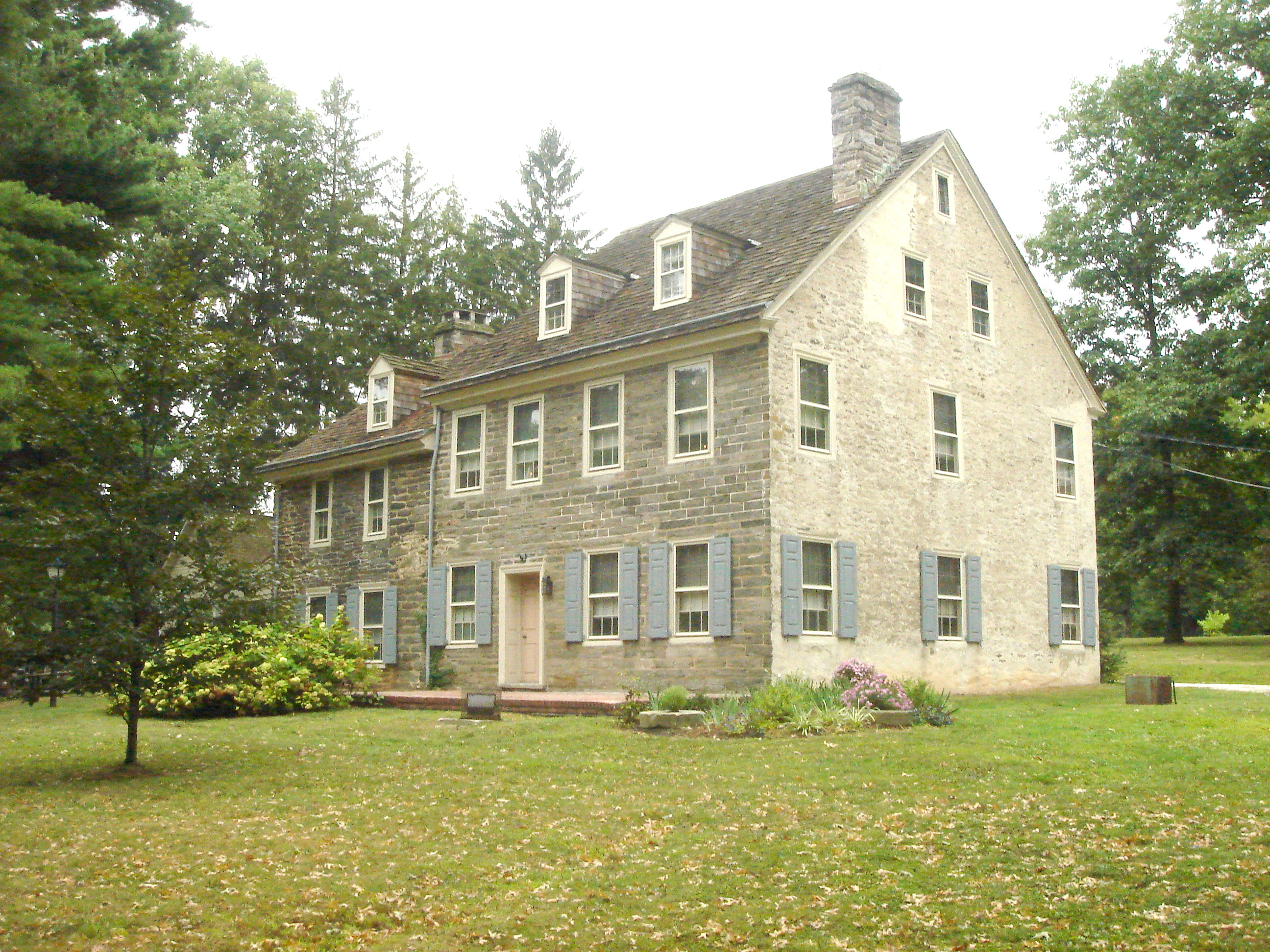
- Richard Wall house in Elkins Park, the second-oldest house in Pennsylvania

- Flag Seal
- Motto: "Salubritas et Eruditio" (Health and Education)
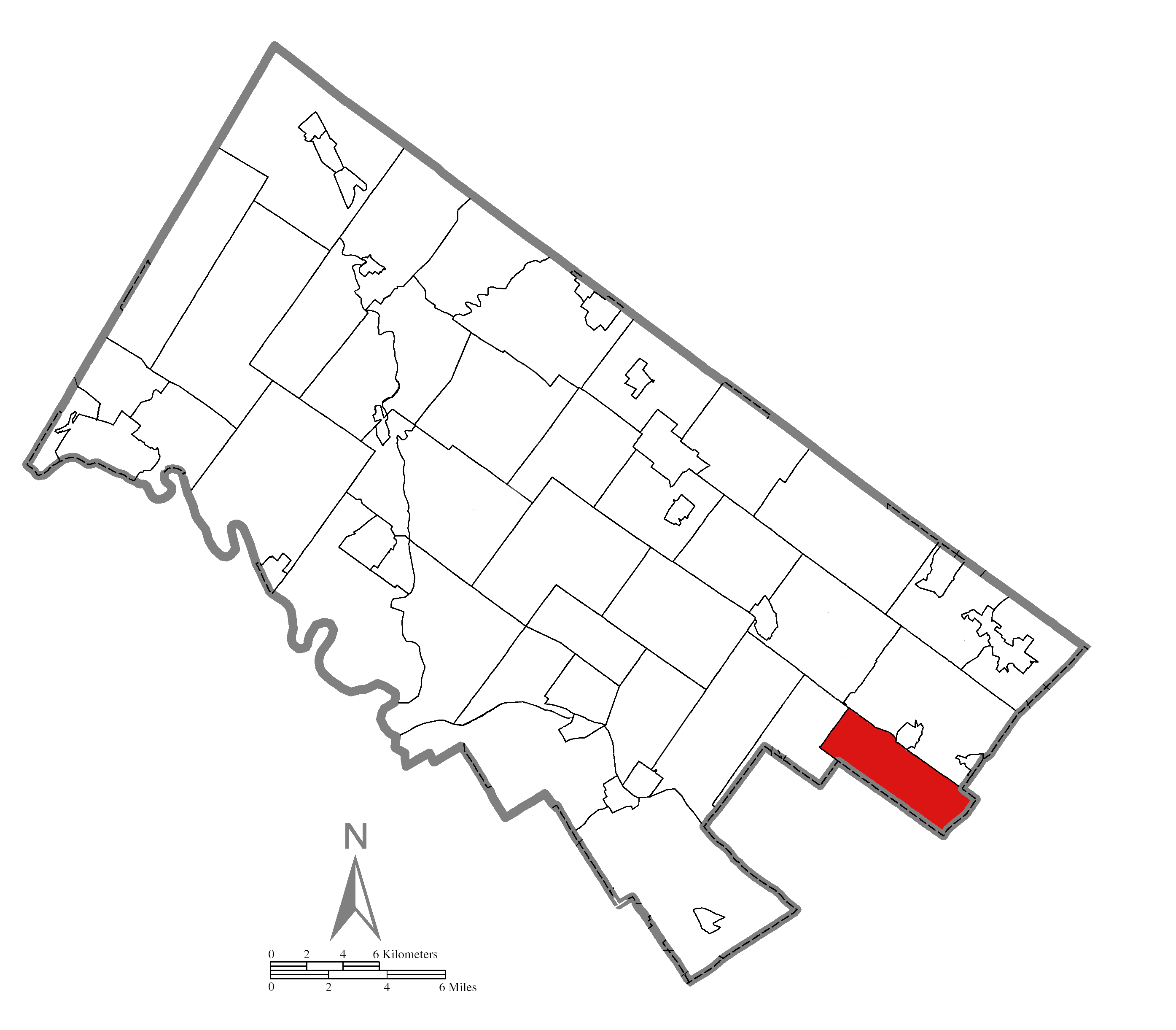
- Location of Cheltenham Township in Montgomery County, Pennsylvania
- Coordinates: 40°04′00″N 75°06′59″W
- Country: United States
- State: Pennsylvania
- County: Philadelphia (1682–1784); Montgomery (1784–present)
- Founded First Class Township Home Rule Municipality: March 22, 1682; 1900; 1976

Area
  - Total: 9.03 sq mi (23.4 km^{2})
  - Land: 9.03 sq mi (23.4 km^{2})
  - Water: 0.00 sq mi (0 km^{2})
- Elevation: 157 ft (48 m)

Population (2020)
  - Total: 37,452
  - Density: 4,150/sq mi (1,600/km^{2})
- Time zone: UTC-5 (Eastern Standard Time)
  - Summer (DST): UTC-4 (Eastern Daylight Time)
- Postal codes: 19012, 19027, 19038, 19095
- Area codes: 215, 267 and 445
- FIPS code: 42-091-12968
- Sister city: Cheltenham, United Kingdom
- Commissioners: Morton J. Simon Jr.; Daniel B. Norris; Irv Brockington; Baron B. Holland; Brad M. Pransky; Ann L. Rappoport; J. Andrew Sharkey
- Website: www.cheltenhamtownship.org

Cheltenham Township is a home-rule township located in the southeast corner of Montgomery County, Pennsylvania, United States. It borders Philadelphia to the south and east, Abington Township and Jenkintown to the north, and Springfield Township to the west.

Cheltenham was founded in 1682, and its early history was defined by mills, which used Tookany Creek to power gristmills, manufacture shovels, hammers, and spades, and later carpentry products such as doors, window frames, and shutters. The development of regional railroads in the early 19th century helped power the American Industrial Revolution, connecting heavy industry factories in Philadelphia with the steel mills and other mining and heavy manufacturing industries in the Lehigh Valley to its north.

In the late 19th and early 20th centuries, Cheltenham transitioned to a community of wealthy industrial and merchant Philadelphians, who built large estates in what was still rural land. The 20th century and Great Depression established Cheltenham as one of Philadelphia's inner ring and streetcar suburbs, and attracted high density housing construction that continued into the postwar years and the 21st century. The Reading Railroad tracks in Cheltenham Township were electrified in 1931, which offered faster passenger service. In 1983, following the Reading Railroad's acquisition by Conrail, the rail lines became part of the heavily-traveled SEPTA Main Line.

In the 21st century, historic homes and buildings designed by Frank Furness, Horace Trumbauer, and Frank Lloyd Wright coexist with split level, twin, row, and other forms of high-density housing, along with parks, arboretums, recreational and educational facilities, tree-lined streets, and commercial corridors.

== History ==
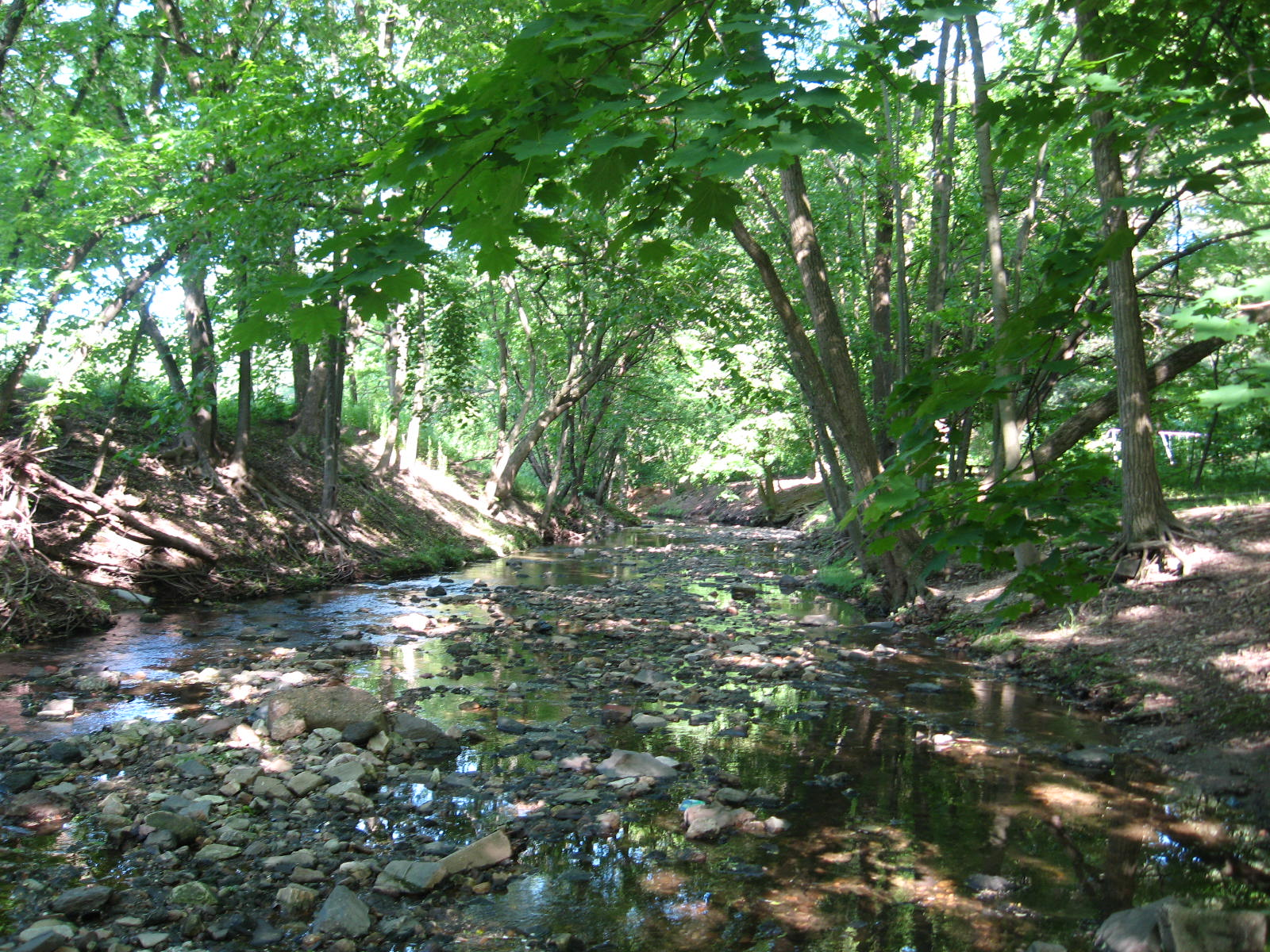
Tookany Creek in Cheltenham Township contributed to the township's industrialization in the 18th century.

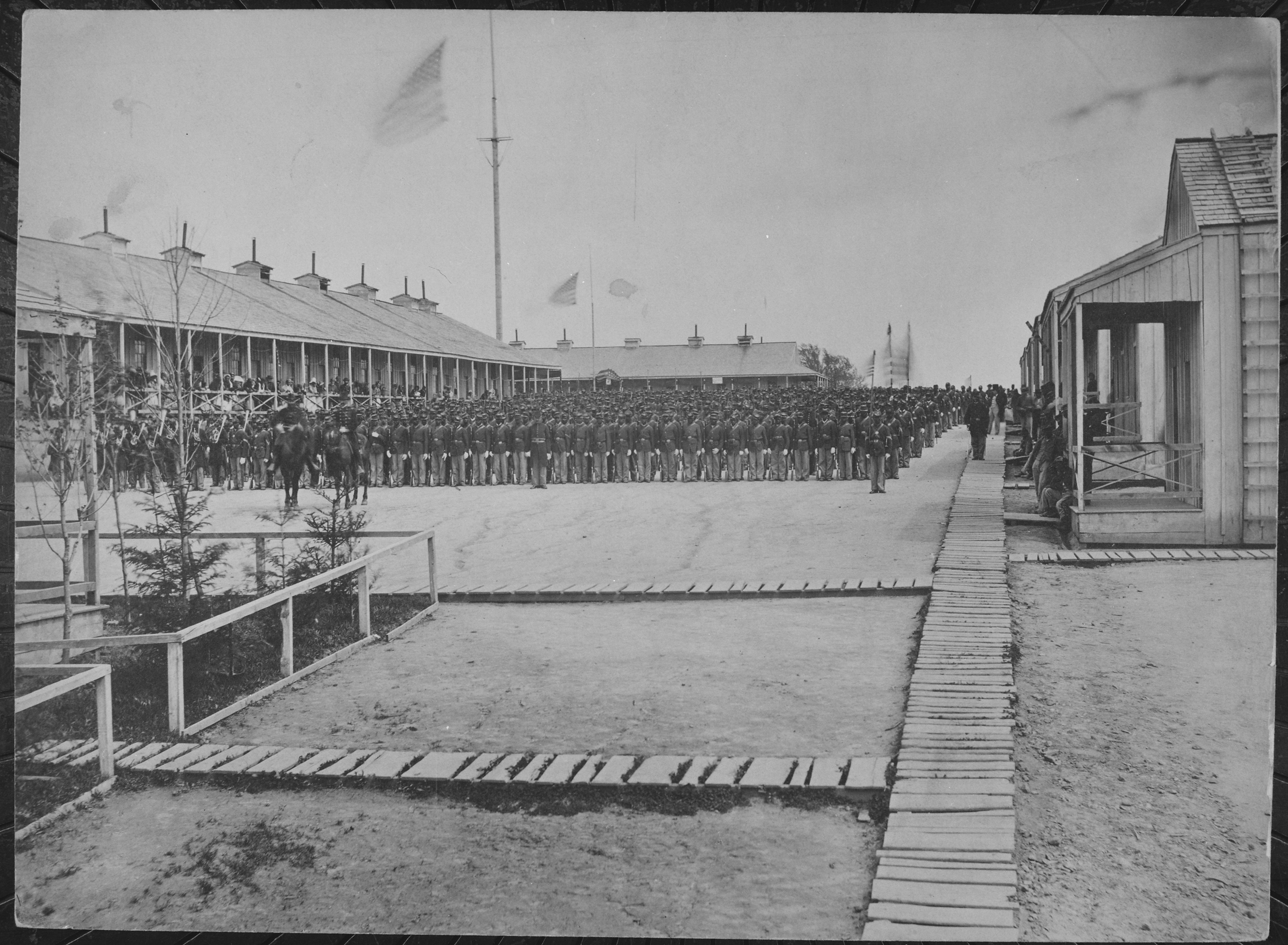
Soldiers at Camp William Penn, c. 1897

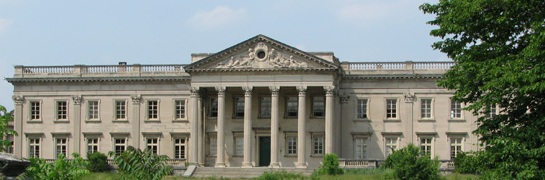
Lynnewood Hall, the former residence Peter A.B. Widener, designed by Horace Trumbauer

=== 17th century ===
Cheltenham was established in 1682 as part of Philadelphia County by 15 Quakers from Cheltenham, England, including Richard Wall and Tobias Leech, who purchased 4,070 acres (1,650 ha) of land from William Penn. Upon creation of Montgomery County in 1784, Cheltenham became the smallest township in the new county.

Cheltenham Township's 15 original founders were:

Name	Land Size	Date given
John West	200 acres (81 ha)	June 29, 1682
Nehemiah Mitchell	210 acres (85 ha)	July 1, 1682
John Day	210 acres (85 ha)	August 5, 1682
William Brown	500 acres (200 ha)	September 10, 1683
Everard Bolton	100 acres (40 ha)	September 10, 1683
John Ashmead	250 acres (100 ha)	September 10, 1683
Tobias Leech	150 acres (61 ha); 200 acres (81 ha)	September 10, 1683; September 10, 1683
Richard Wall Sr.	100 acres (40 ha); 200 acres (81 ha)	May 2, 1683; September 10, 1683
Richard Wall Jr.	100 acres (40 ha)	September 10, 1683
Patrick Robinson	200 acres (81 ha)	November 5, 1683
John Russell	300 acres (120 ha)	November 5, 1683
William Frampton	500 acres (200 ha)	January 13, 1683
Mary Jefferson	300 acres (120 ha)	January 13, 1683
Thomas Phillips	300 acres (120 ha)	June 13, 1683
Humphrey Morrey	260 acres (110 ha)	May 23, 1683
Total area	4,070 acres (1,650 ha)	

Cheltenham was fueled by the development of various mills along Tookany Creek. Communities and villages grew around these mills and formed what is now modern Cheltenham neighborhoods. The first gristmill was built by Richard Dungworth in 1690. After changing ownership several times, the Rowland family eventually made the mill the second-largest producer of shovels in the United States. The site was demolished in 1929.

=== 18th century ===
The U.S. Colored Troops 3rd Regiment were the first to be trained at Camp William Penn. It is tradition that soldiers have a grand parade before leaving for war, but Philadelphia was partially a racist community at that time and the government believed that a parade might cause a riot, so it was cancelled. The leader of the Camp (Colonel Louis Wagner) was furious and made sure the next regiment to come through would have a parade.

=== 19th century ===
In the late 19th century, Cheltenham established itself as one of the most prominent communities in the Philadelphia area. Railroad tycoon Jay Cooke was one of the first to build his mansion in Cheltenham. His 200-acre estate was eventually converted to a school in 1883 and was later demolished. John Wanamaker built his mansion Lindenhurst, which was destroyed by a fire in 1907. His second Lindenhurst was destroyed by another fire in 1944. Henry Breyer Jr. eventually bought the land from Wanamaker.

Other notable mansions built include Abraham Barker's "Lyndon," Cyrus H. K. Curtis's "Curtis Hall," George Horace Lorimer's "Belgrame," and John B. Stetson's "Idro." Perhaps the most famous mansions that still stand to this day are the prominent Widener family mansion Lynnewood Hall, the Elkins Estate which was home to William Elkins, and Grey Towers Castle which was home to William Welsh Harrison. The latter is a National Historic Landmark and was designed by famed architect Horace Trumbauer, who designed many buildings and homes in Cheltenham.

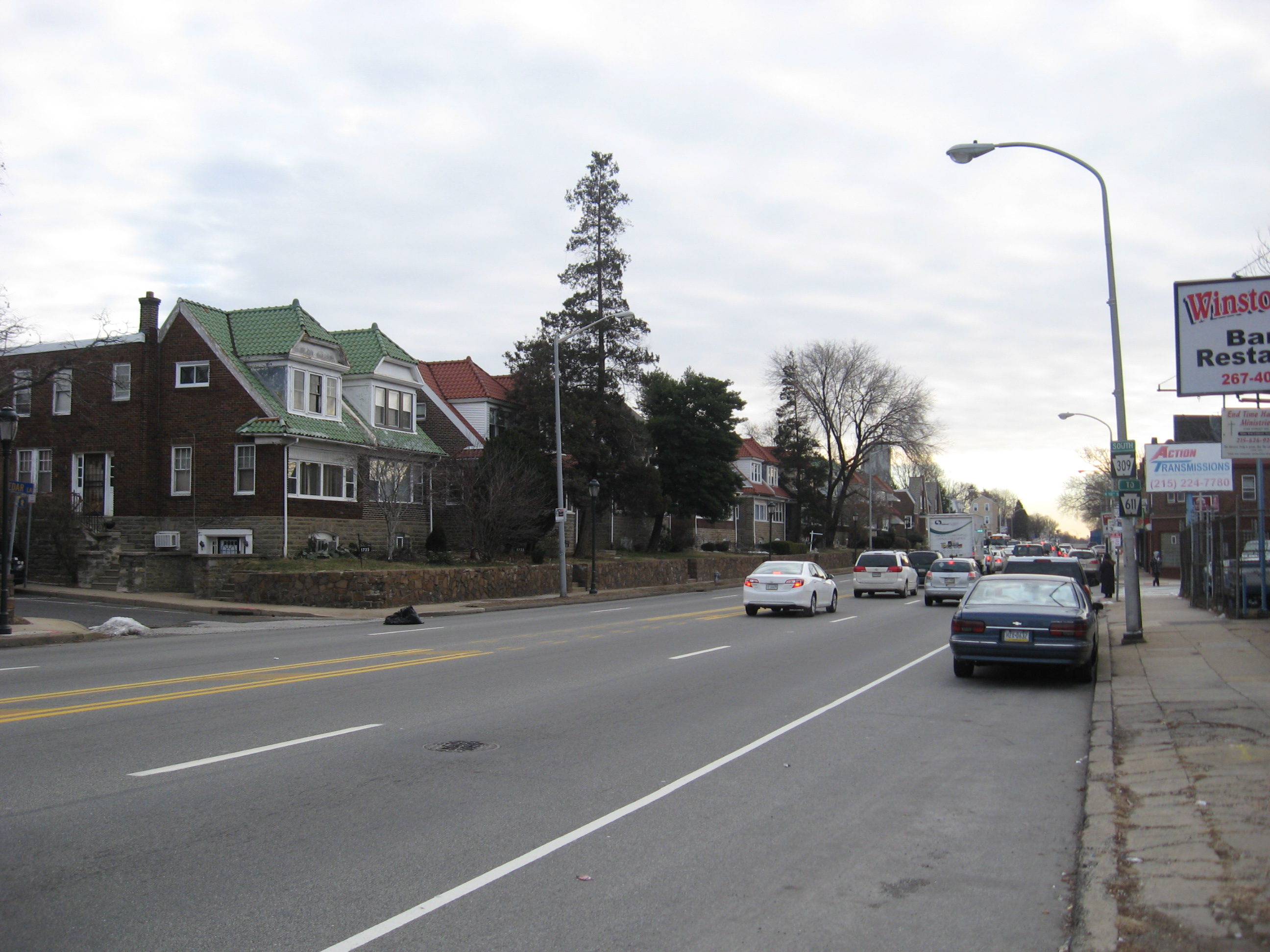
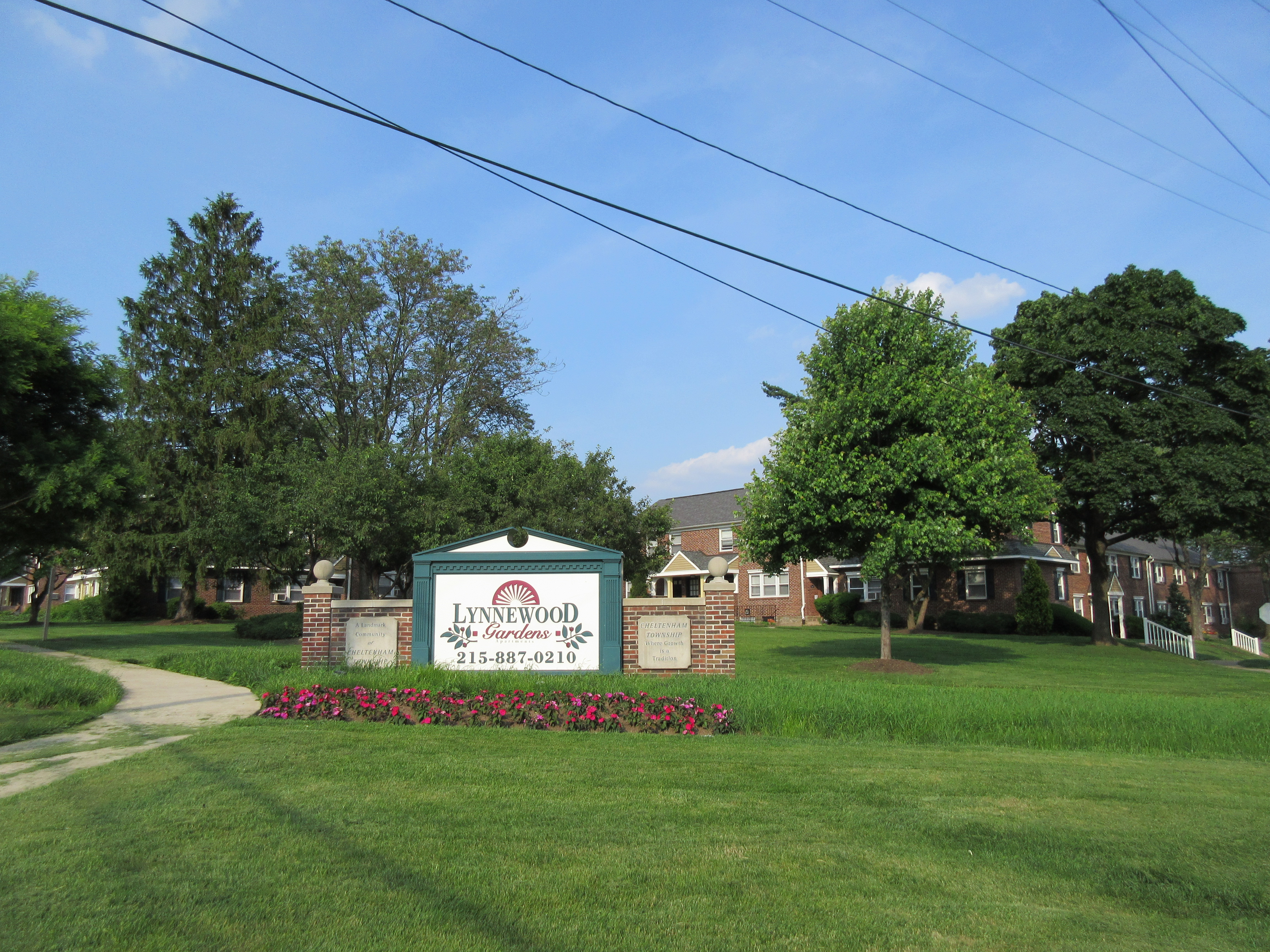
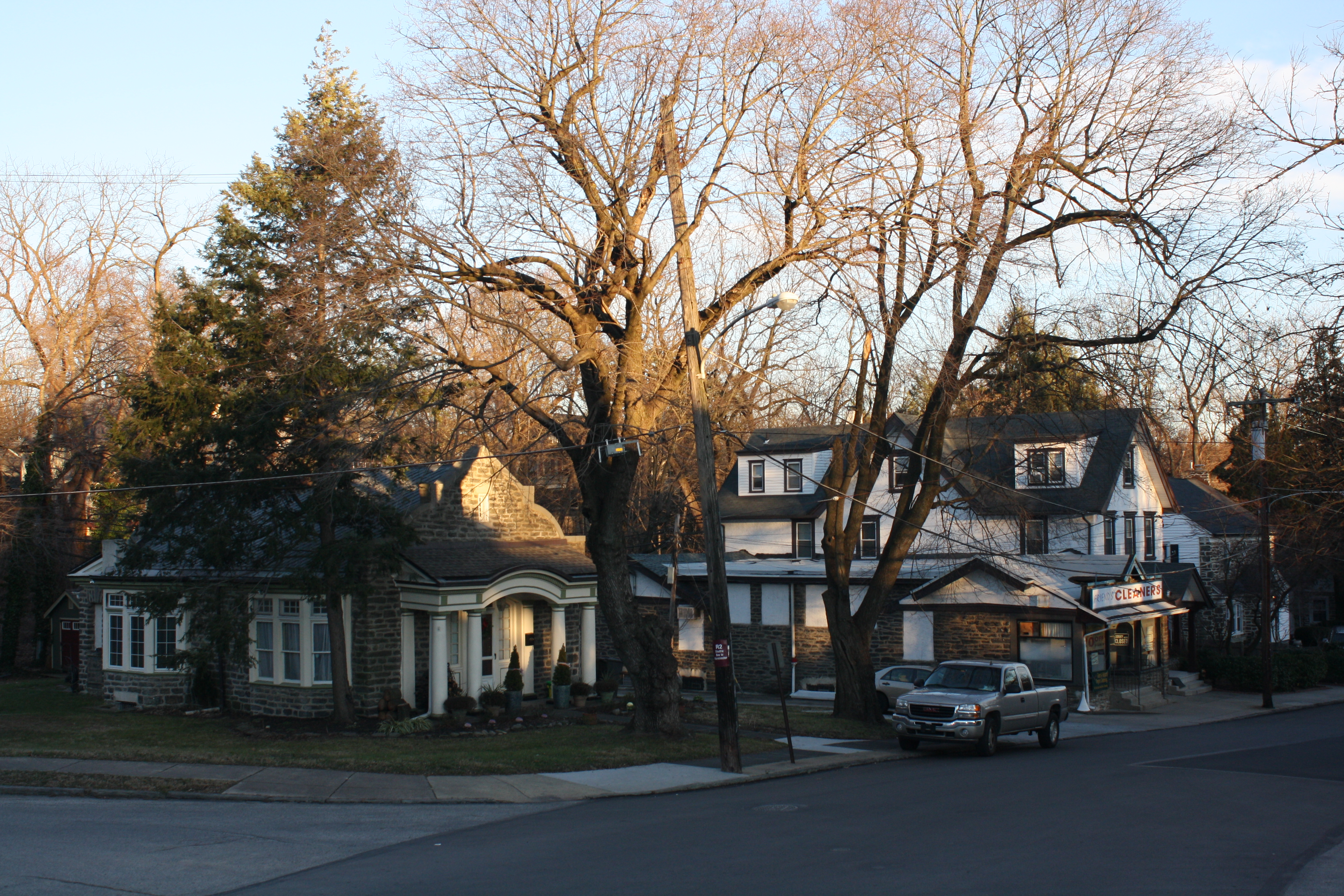
Cheltenham's housing stock is very diverse with rowhouses and townhouses along Cheltenham Avenue and old historic neighborhoods as well.

As the Gilded Age ended and the Great Depression hit the country, many of the estates and mansions were destroyed and made way for the building of houses in their place. Many of the communities that were formed in the early stages of Cheltenham remained, and still exist to this day.

As the 20th century progressed, many people moved out of the city and into the first community over the city line, Cheltenham. With the population increase, the township's identity evolved from being largely a community of prominent Philadelphians and their mansions to several distinct communities. One of the major groups to come to Cheltenham was Koreans. The original Koreatown was located in the Olney section of Philadelphia, but eventually was moved north to Logan. Large pockets of Koreans were eventually established in Cheltenham, and also in Upper Darby Township and West Philadelphia.

Other immigrants migrated to Cheltenham, making it one of the most diverse municipalities in the Philadelphia metropolitan area. By the 2000 census, Cheltenham Township was one of two municipalities in Montgomery County that had a non-white population exceeding 20 percent; the other was Norristown.

Cheltenham and other early communities in the Philadelphia area, including Upper Darby Township, Haverford, Lower Merion, and Jenkintown have retained their distinct identities while being surrounded by suburbia over the middle to late part of the twentieth century.

Cheltenham and Lower Merion are of the few townships in Montgomery County who had a large population prior to the postwar population boom and thus whose majority of houses, communities, and streets have remained virtually unchanged since the early 20th century. Cheltenham has 13 listings on the National Register of Historic Places, the most of any municipality in Montgomery County. Cheltenham became a township of the first class in 1900. In 1976, it passed a home rule charter that took effect in 1977.

Cheltenham was the former home of Cradle of Liberty Council Breyer Training Area. Henry W. Breyer Jr. used property formerly owned by Cheltenham resident John Wanamaker. It closed in 1990 and is now the home of Salus University.

Cheltenham was named a Preserve America community, a U.S. government program established to preserve historic communities throughout the United States.

It is also a Tree City USA member, a program dedicated to forestry management.

In 2013, Cheltenham Township was named a "Classic Town of Greater Philadelphia," for being "one of the most diverse, unique, and livable communities in our region" and "truly at the center of it all."

=== Books ===
There are at least four books about Cheltenham Township's history:

- A History of Cheltenham Township by Elaine Rothschild
- Images of America Cheltenham Township by Old York Road Historical Society
- Remembering Cheltenham Township by Donald Scott Sr.
- Making Marathon: A History of Early Wyncote by Thomas J. Wieckowski

== Unincorporated districts ==
Cheltenham Township has ten districts: Glenside, Laverock, Edge Hill, Wyncote, Cedarbrook, Chelten Hills, La Mott, Elkins Park, Melrose Park, and Cheltenham Village.

== Township seal ==
The seal of Cheltenham was adopted from the seal of the namesake and sister city, Cheltenham, England. It appears on all formal documents, resolutions, proclamations, and all legal records or documents. The pigeon on top of a blue sphere represents the founding of the fountain spa which made Cheltenham famous. They are placed above a wreath of Oak leaves. The two books represent Education, in particular, the Pates Grammar School and the Cheltenham College. The silver cross in the middle represents religion. The two pigeons represent the flock that would gather at the spas. Finally, the Oak tree represents the many Oak trees that line the streets of Cheltenham and promenades.

== Geography ==
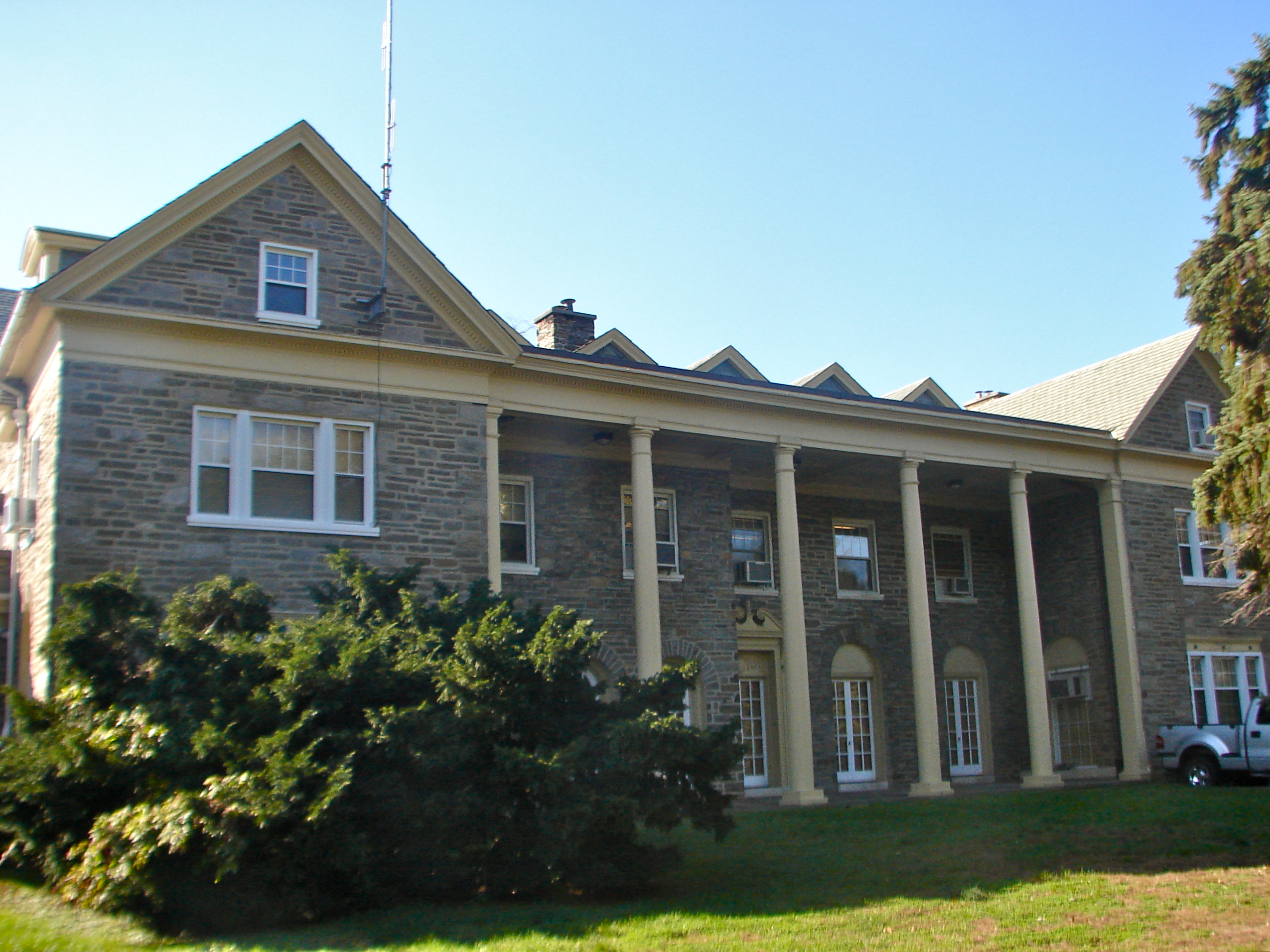
The Cheltenham Township Municipal Building on Old York Road

Cheltenham is a residential township in the southeasternmost part of Montgomery County, which is in Southeastern Pennsylvania (locally known as the Philadelphia metropolitan area). It is one of seven municipalities in Montgomery County that borders Philadelphia and is 5 miles (8.0 km) northeast of the Center City. It also borders Abington Township and Jenkintown on the north side and Springfield Township on the west side.

According to the U.S. Census Bureau, the township has a total area of 9.0 square miles (23 km^{2}), all land. The area consists of rolling hills and also features a few streams flowing through it, most notably the Tookany Creek. The highest elevation is 411 feet (125 m), at the intersection of Sunset and Lindley Roads. The lowest elevation is 63 feet (19 m), in the southeasternmost part of the township, where Tookany Creek flows into Philadelphia. It includes the census-designated places of Arcadia University, Glenside, and Wyncote. Other communities include Cheltenham, Elkins Park, Melrose Park, La Mott and Laverock, Edge Hill, and Cedarbrook. All of the communities form a border with Philadelphia along Cheltenham Avenue.

== Communities in Cheltenham ==
Place	Type	Area	Population	Density	Zip Code
Arcadia University	CDP	0.057 square miles (0.15 km^{2})	595	10,438.6	19038
Cheltenham (Cheltenham Village)	CDP	0.43 square miles (1.1 km^{2})	4,810	5,705	19012
Elkins Park	CDP	2.1 square miles (5.4 km^{2})	9,260	4,630	19027
Glenside	CDP	1.3 square miles (3.4 km^{2})	8,384	6,449.2	19038
La Mott	Unincorporated community	0.261 square miles (0.68 km^{2})	3554	13,616.7	19027
McKinley (part)	CDP	?	?	?	?
Melrose Park	Unincorporated community	0.660 square miles (1.71 km^{2})	3,006	4,554.5	19027
Wyncote	CDP	0.8 square miles (2.1 km^{2})	3,044	3,805	19095

Edge Hill, Laverock, and Cedarbrook's exact populations and land area are uncertain.

== Demographics ==
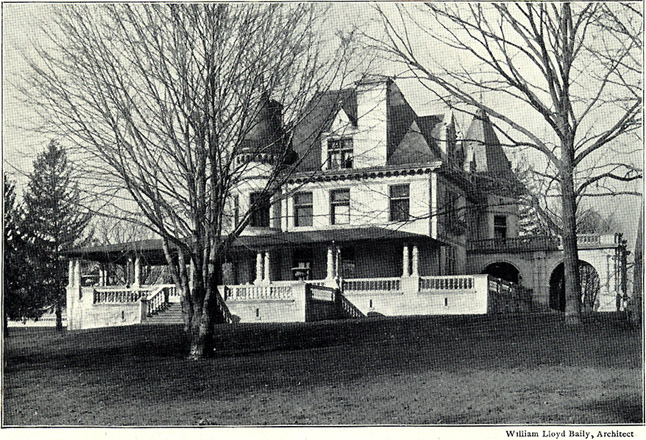
The home of Cyrus H. K. Curtis, a longtime Cheltenham resident

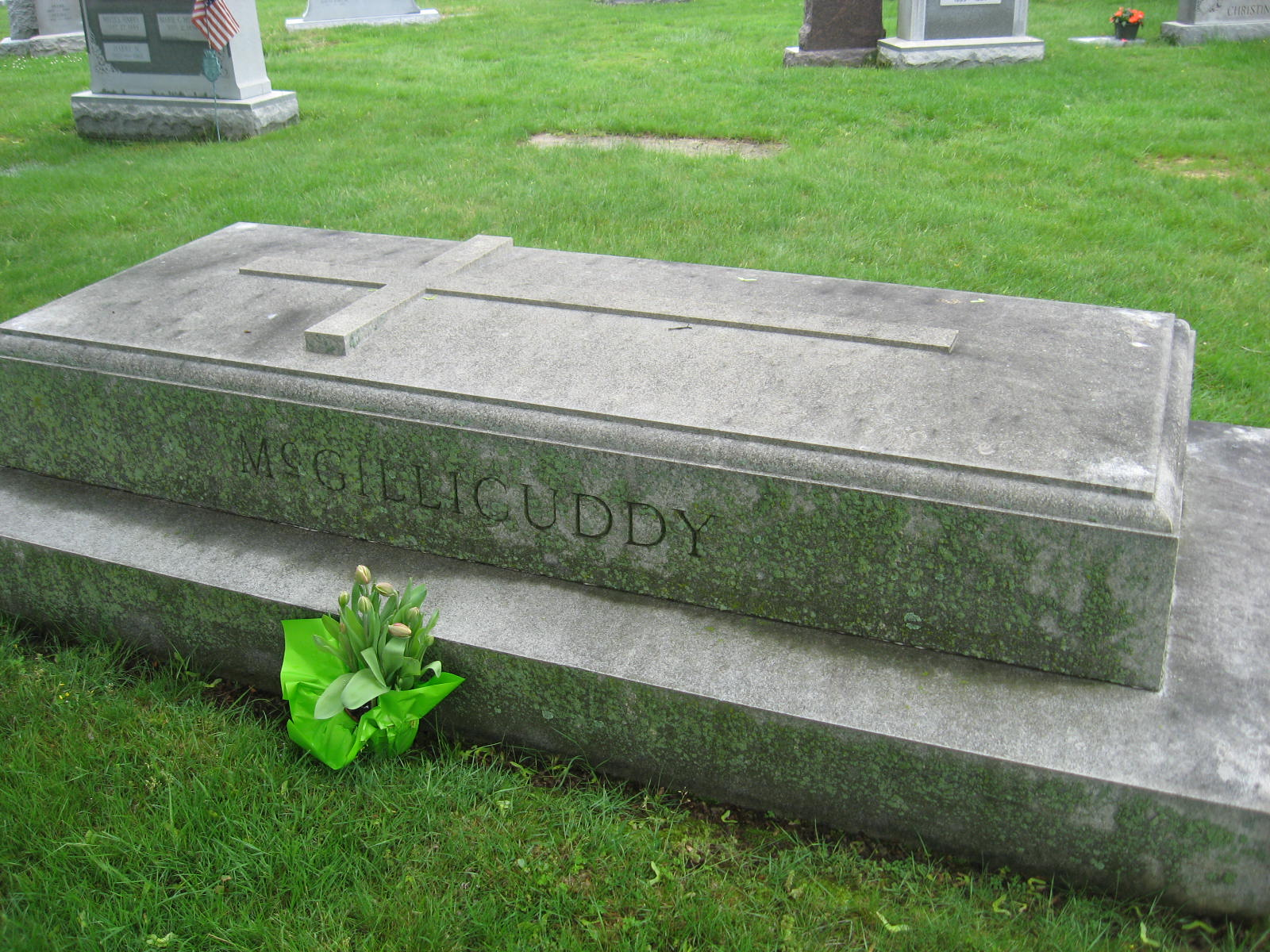
The grave of Hall of Fame Philadelphia Athletics manager Connie Mack in Holy Sepulchre Cemetery

As of the 2010 census, Cheltenham Township was 56.6% White, 32.8% Black or African-American, 0.2% Native American, 7.7% Asian, and 2.5% were two or more races. 3.9% of the population were of Hispanic or Latino ancestry. The median income for a family in Cheltenham in the 2010 Census was $72,584.

According to the 2010 Census, 30.4% of the townships households had children under the age of 18 living with them, 53.4% were headed by married couples living together, 10.6% had a female householder with no husband present, and 32.8% were non-families. 27.6% of all households were made up of individuals, and 12.5% had someone living alone who was 65 years of age or older. The average household size was 2.47 and the average family size was 3.05. The age distribution was 22.8% under 18, 8.5% from 18 to 24, 25.9% from 25 to 44, 24.1% from 45 to 64, and 18.6% who were 65 or older. The median age was 40 years. For every 100 females, there were 86.3 males. For every 100 females age 18 and over, there were 81.0 males.

In 2022, the median income for a family in Cheltenham was $138,731 and for a married couple family it was $158,275 vs $136,304 and $152,228 respectively for Montgomery County as a whole.

In 2022, the median income for a household in the township was $102,589, up from $61,713 in 2010.

In 2010, males had a median income of $50,564 versus $36,439 for females. The per capita income for the township in 2010 was $31,424 (~$46,395 in 2025). About 3.0% of families and 8.4% of the population were below the poverty line, including 6.5% of those under age 18 and 3.2% of those age 65 or over.

Historical population
Census	Pop.	Note	%±
1790	627		—
1900	6,154		—
1910	8,434		37.0%
1920	11,015		30.6%
1930	15,731		42.8%
1940	19,082		21.3%
1950	22,854		19.8%
1960	35,990		57.5%
1970	40,066		11.3%
1980	35,509		−11.4%
1990	34,923		−1.7%
2000	36,875		5.6%
2010	36,793		−0.2%
2020	37,452		1.8%

Cheltenham Township, Pennsylvania – Racial and ethnic composition Note: the US Census treats Hispanic/Latino as an ethnic category. This table excludes Latinos from the racial categories and assigns them to a separate category. Hispanics/Latinos may be of any race.
Race / Ethnicity (NH = Non-Hispanic)	Pop 2000	Pop 2010	Pop 2020	% 2000	% 2010	2020
White alone (NH)	24,141	20,439	16,641	65.47%	55.55%	44.43%
Black or African American alone (NH)	9,010	11,203	13,834	24.43%	30.45%	36.94%
Native American or Alaska Native alone (NH)	37	68	71	0.10%	0.18%	0.19%
Asian alone (NH)	2,373	2,814	2,653	6.44%	7.65%	7.08%
Pacific Islander alone (NH)	23	11	2	0.06%	0.03%	0.01%
Some Other Race alone (NH)	58	86	299	0.16%	0.23%	0.80%
Mixed Race or Multi-Racial (NH)	501	744	1,509	1.36%	2.02%	4.03%
Hispanic or Latino (any race)	732	1,428	2,443	1.99%	3.88%	6.52%
Total	36,875	36,793	37,452	100.00%	100.00%	100.00%

== Weather ==
Cheltenham is located on the borderline of the humid subtropical climate (Cfa) and the hot-summer humid continental climate (Dfa) zones. As with most Northeast townships, Cheltenham has four distinct seasons. Summers are warm and have occasional heat waves. Autumn is cool and comfortable. Winters are cold, most days hovering around the freezing mark with nights dipping to the teens. Spring is pleasant with often not too much precipitation. The hardiness zone is 7a.

The largest snowstorm as of late was in 2010, when the first storm came on February 5–6 and nearly 30 inches (76 cm) of snow fell. Just two days later, a second storm came and dropped another 20 inches (51 cm).

Climate data for Elkins Park, Cheltenham Township
Month	Jan	Feb	Mar	Apr	May	Jun	Jul	Aug	Sep	Oct	Nov	Dec	Year
Mean daily maximum °F (°C)	38 (3)	42 (6)	50 (10)	62 (17)	72 (22)	81 (27)	85 (29)	84 (29)	77 (25)	65 (18)	54 (12)	43 (6)	63 (17)
Mean daily minimum °F (°C)	21 (−6)	24 (−4)	32 (0)	41 (5)	51 (11)	62 (17)	67 (19)	65 (18)	56 (13)	43 (6)	34 (1)	23 (−5)	43 (6)
Average precipitation inches (mm)	3.44 (87)	3.01 (76)	4.32 (110)	4.12 (105)	4.37 (111)	4.60 (117)	5.05 (128)	3.98 (101)	4.58 (116)	3.82 (97)	3.92 (100)	4.23 (107)	49.44 (1,255)
Source: The Weather Channel

Climate data for Cheltenham (Elevation: 125 ft (38 m)) 1981 - 2010 Averages
Month	Jan	Feb	Mar	Apr	May	Jun	Jul	Aug	Sep	Oct	Nov	Dec	Year
Mean daily maximum °F (°C)	40.6 (4.8)	43.9 (6.6)	52.0 (11.1)	63.3 (17.4)	73.0 (22.8)	82.3 (27.9)	86.3 (30.2)	84.9 (29.4)	78.0 (25.6)	66.7 (19.3)	55.9 (13.3)	44.9 (7.2)	64.4 (18.0)
Daily mean °F (°C)	33.2 (0.7)	35.9 (2.2)	43.2 (6.2)	53.7 (12.1)	63.2 (17.3)	72.8 (22.7)	77.3 (25.2)	76.0 (24.4)	68.8 (20.4)	57.3 (14.1)	47.5 (8.6)	37.7 (3.2)	55.6 (13.1)
Mean daily minimum °F (°C)	25.8 (−3.4)	27.8 (−2.3)	34.3 (1.3)	44.0 (6.7)	53.4 (11.9)	63.2 (17.3)	68.4 (20.2)	67.1 (19.5)	59.6 (15.3)	48.0 (8.9)	39.2 (4.0)	30.4 (−0.9)	46.9 (8.3)
Average precipitation inches (mm)	3.46 (88)	2.77 (70)	4.10 (104)	3.92 (100)	4.15 (105)	4.12 (105)	4.96 (126)	4.24 (108)	4.29 (109)	3.71 (94)	3.52 (89)	3.92 (100)	47.16 (1,198)
Average relative humidity (%)	65.5	61.6	57.3	57.2	61.4	63.5	65.0	66.9	68.0	67.9	66.5	66.6	64.0
Average dew point °F (°C)	22.9 (−5.1)	24.0 (−4.4)	29.1 (−1.6)	38.9 (3.8)	49.7 (9.8)	59.7 (15.4)	64.6 (18.1)	64.2 (17.9)	57.8 (14.3)	46.8 (8.2)	36.9 (2.7)	27.6 (−2.4)	43.6 (6.4)
Source: PRISM

== Politics and government ==
Presidential elections results
Year	Republican	Democratic
2024	14.7% 3,348	84.3% 19,210
2020	13.9% 3,201	85.3% 19,635
2016	13.9% 2,928	82.8% 17,501
2012	18.1% 3,783	80.9% 16,873
2008	19.3% 4,043	80.0% 16,728
2004	22.7% 4,690	77.0% 15,866
2000	22.0% 4,106	76.0% 14,169
1996	23.2% 4,040	70.1% 12,190
1992	24.3% 4,723	65.0% 12,624

Cheltenham Township does not have a mayor. Rather it is governed by a Board of Commissioners, who are elected one from each of the township's seven wards for a four-year term. A President of the Board is elected by these commissioners for a one-year term to serve as the head of the government. Daniel B. Norris is the current Board President. A school board is in charge of the school district.

The township is in the Fourth Congressional District (represented by Rep. Madeleine Dean), and Pennsylvania's 154th Representative District (represented by Rep. Napoleon Nelson). It is also in Pennsylvania's 4th Senatorial District (represented by Sen. Arthur L. Haywood III).

Cheltenham is currently a very Democratic heavy community, winning by large margins in each of the past six presidential elections. The only municipality in Montgomery County in the 2012 election that had a higher Democratic voting percentage was Norristown's 82.99%, compared to Cheltenham's 80.85%.

Cheltenham is one of only seven Townships in Pennsylvania, and of 29 municipalities in the entire state, to prohibit discrimination on the basis of sexual orientation and gender identity by executive order.

=== Commissioners ===
The following is a table of the current commissioners of Cheltenham Township along with their Wards and the areas of the township they serve:

Name	Ward	Area Served
Matthew Areman	1	Glenside and Edgehill
Baron B. Holland	2	Laverock, Cedarbrook, west Wyncote and Curtis Hills
Jeff Chirico	3	La Mott, west Elkins Park and Wyncote
Emily Stine	4	Lynnewood Gardens, north Wyncote, west Elkins Park and east Glenside
Daniel B. Norris	5	Melrose Park
Emily Cheramie Walz	6	Elkins Park
Irv Brockington	7	Cheltenham Village, Rowland Park and Oak Lane Manor

== Education ==
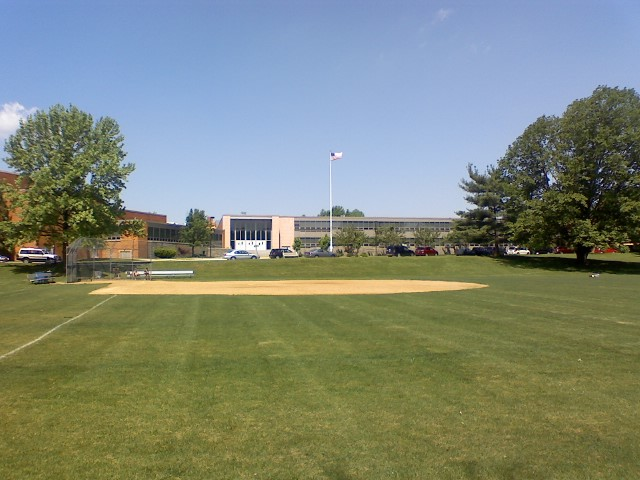
Cheltenham High School, established in 1884

The Cheltenham Township School District serves the township. There are seven public schools and a number of private schools. Public schools include Cheltenham Elementary School (k-5), Myers Elementary School (k-5), Glenside Elementary School (k-5), Wyncote Elementary School (k-5), Cedarbrook East - temporary (6th), Cedarbrook Middle School (7–8), and Cheltenham High School (9–12).

Bishop McDevitt High School (9–12) under the jurisdiction of the Roman Catholic Archdiocese of Philadelphia, was a private Catholic high school open from 1958 until its closure in 2021. Other current day private schools include Wyncote Academy, Perelman Jewish Day School, Ancillae-Assumpta Academy, Presentation B.V.M. School and Gospel of Grace Christian School.

The section of Elkins Park in Cheltenham is the former home of Tyler School of Art, a conceptual fine-arts school that is part of Temple University. Cheltenham is also home to Arcadia University (formerly known as Beaver College), Drexel University Elkins Park Campus (formerly known Salus University, and before that known as The Pennsylvania College of Optometry), Westminster Theological Seminary, Gratz College and Reconstructionist Rabbinical College, the only seminary affiliated with Reconstructionist Judaism. Cheltenham was also the former home of the Oak Lane Day School for 44 years until it moved to its current home in Blue Bell.

== Infrastructure ==
=== Transportation ===
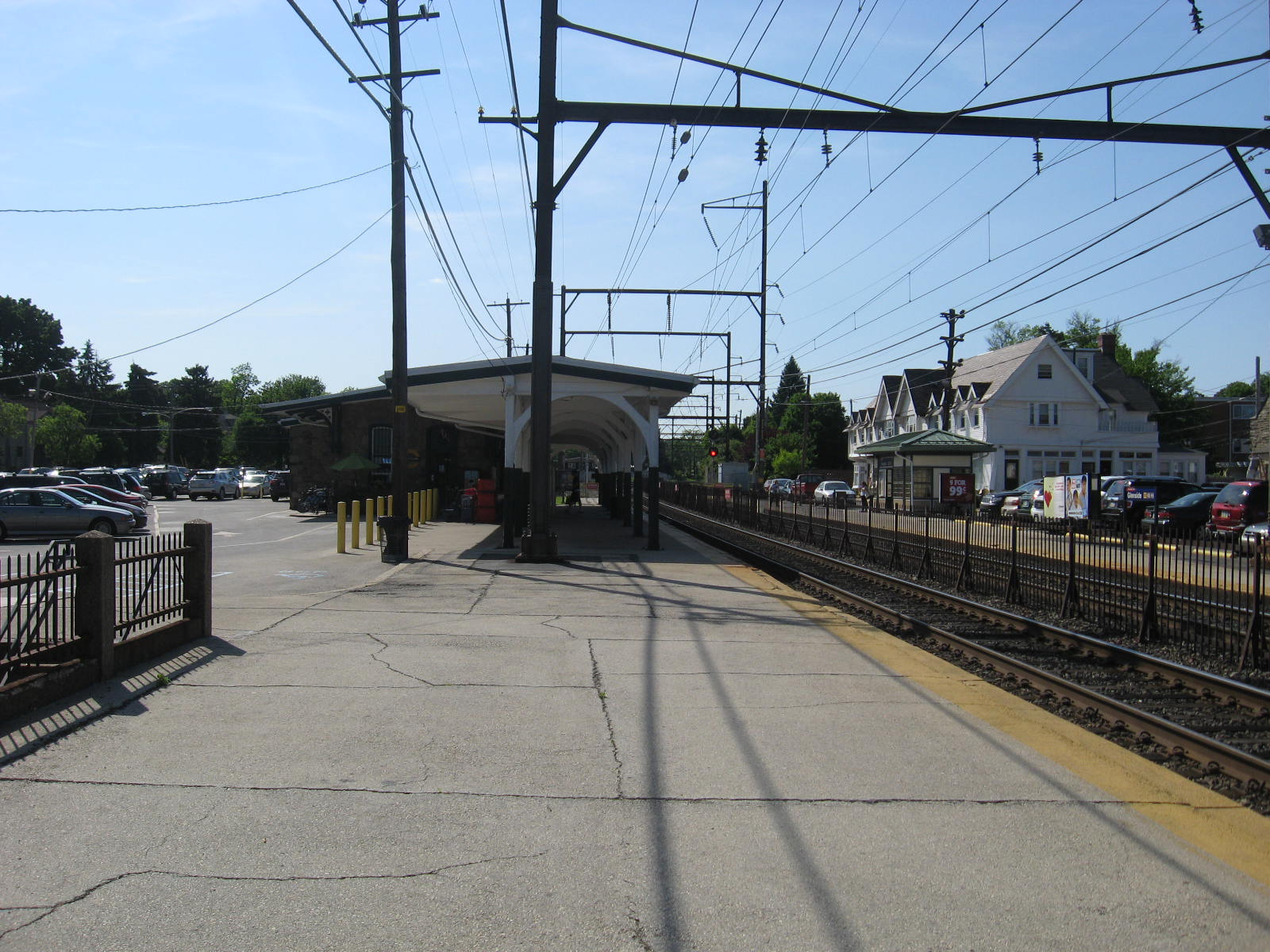
Glenside Station

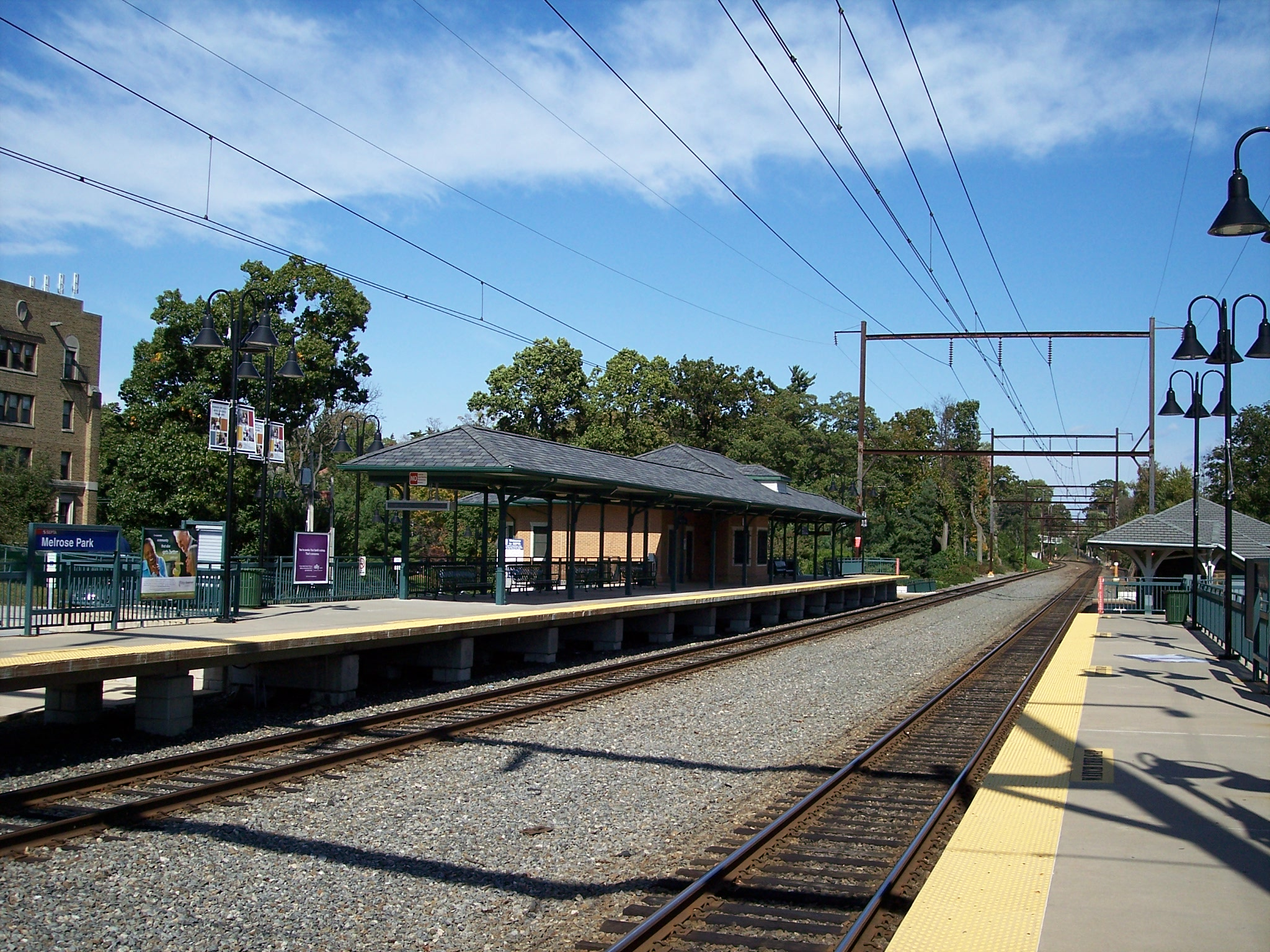
Melrose Park Station

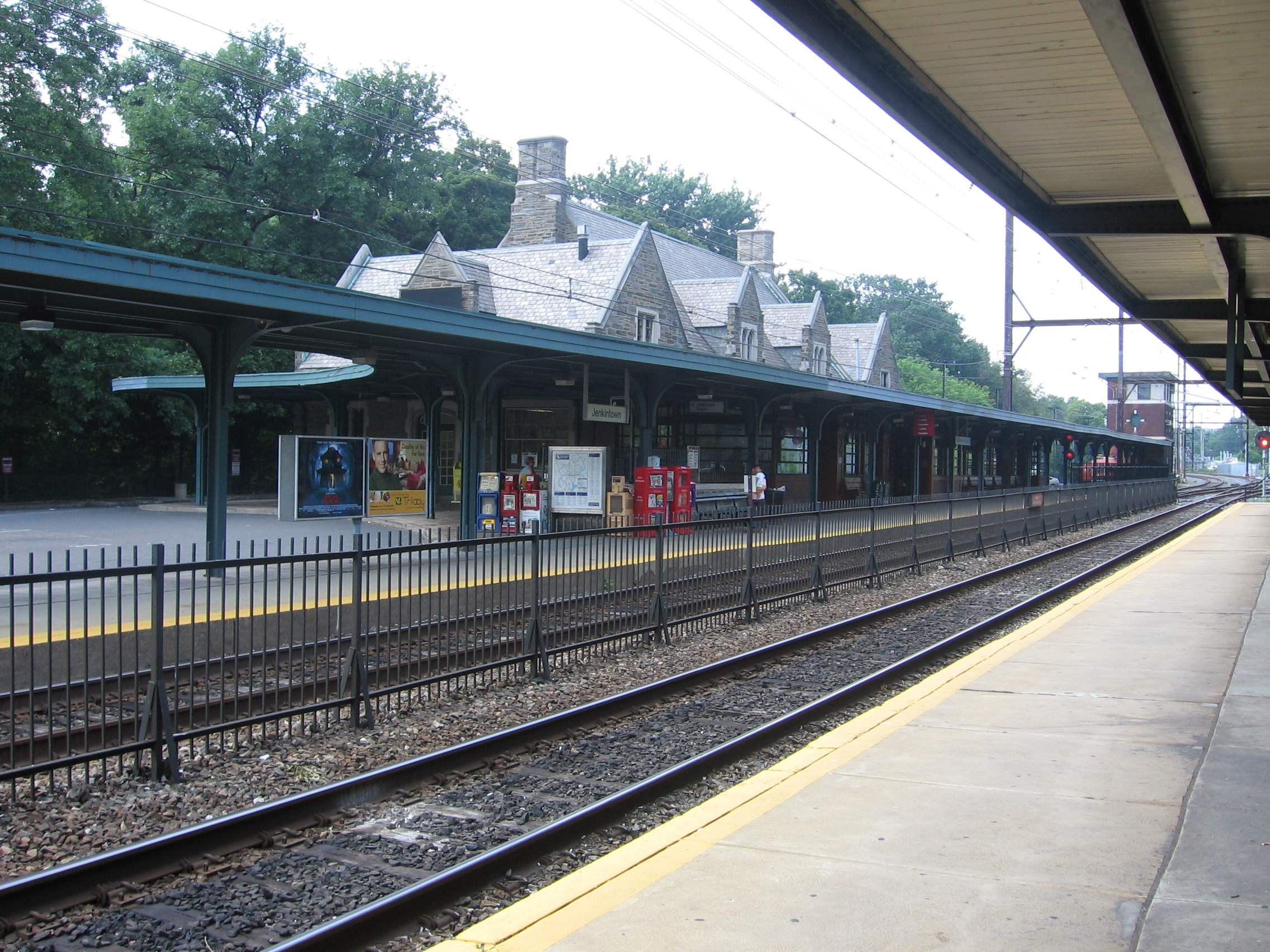
Jenkintown-Wyncote Station

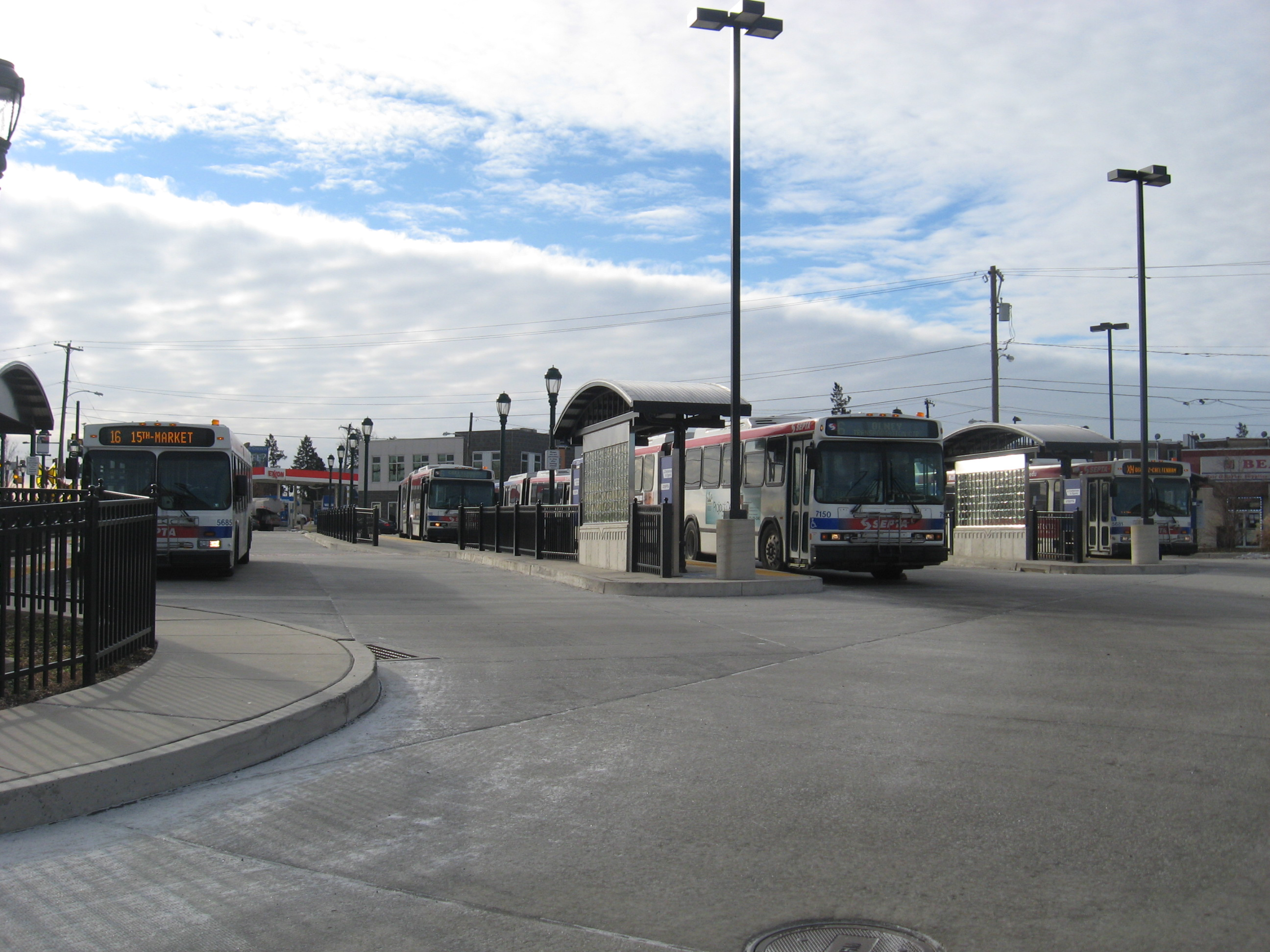
SEPTA Buses waiting on the docks at the Cheltenham-Ogontz Bus Loop

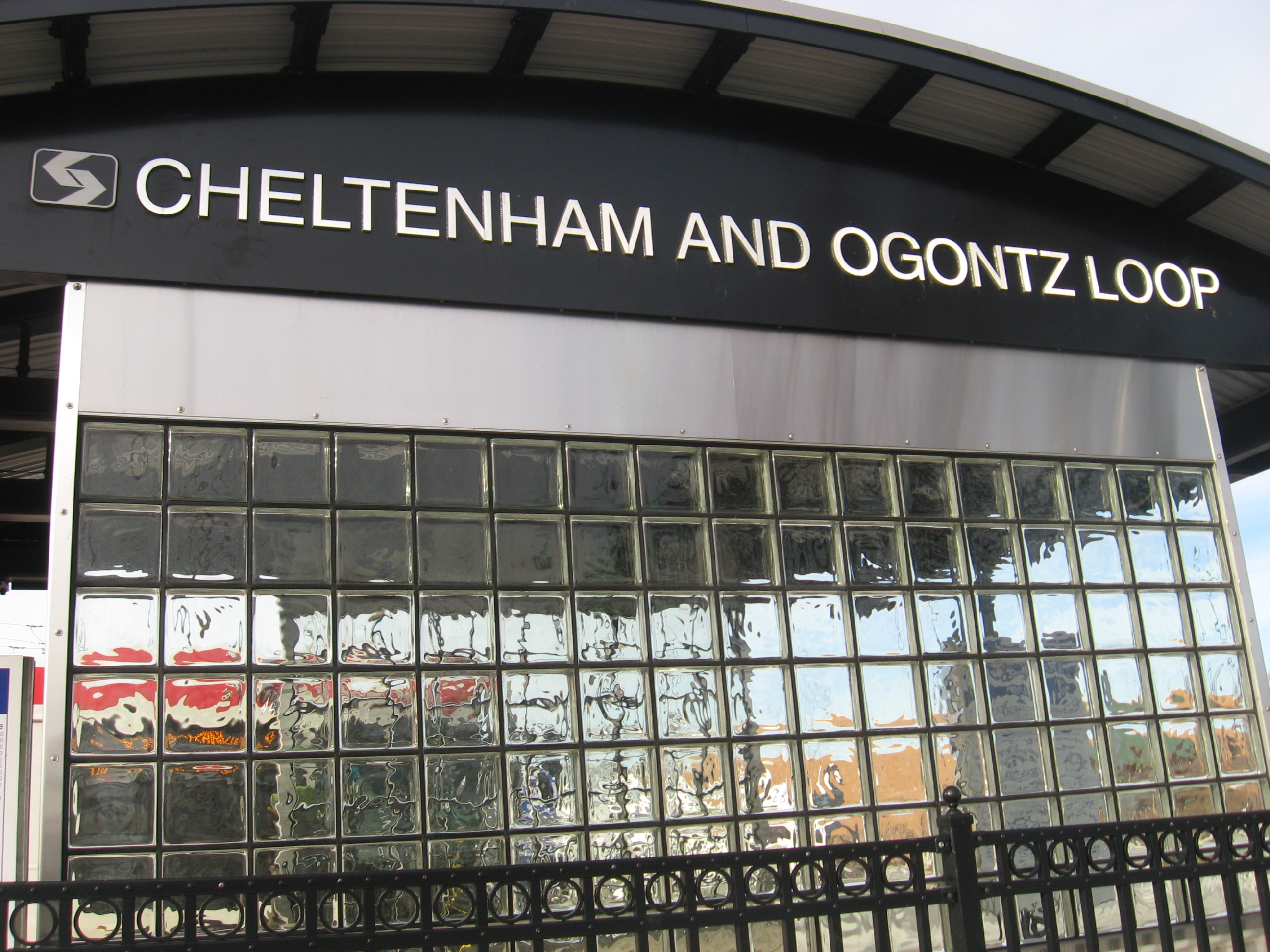
Cheltenham-Ogontz Bus Loop waiting area

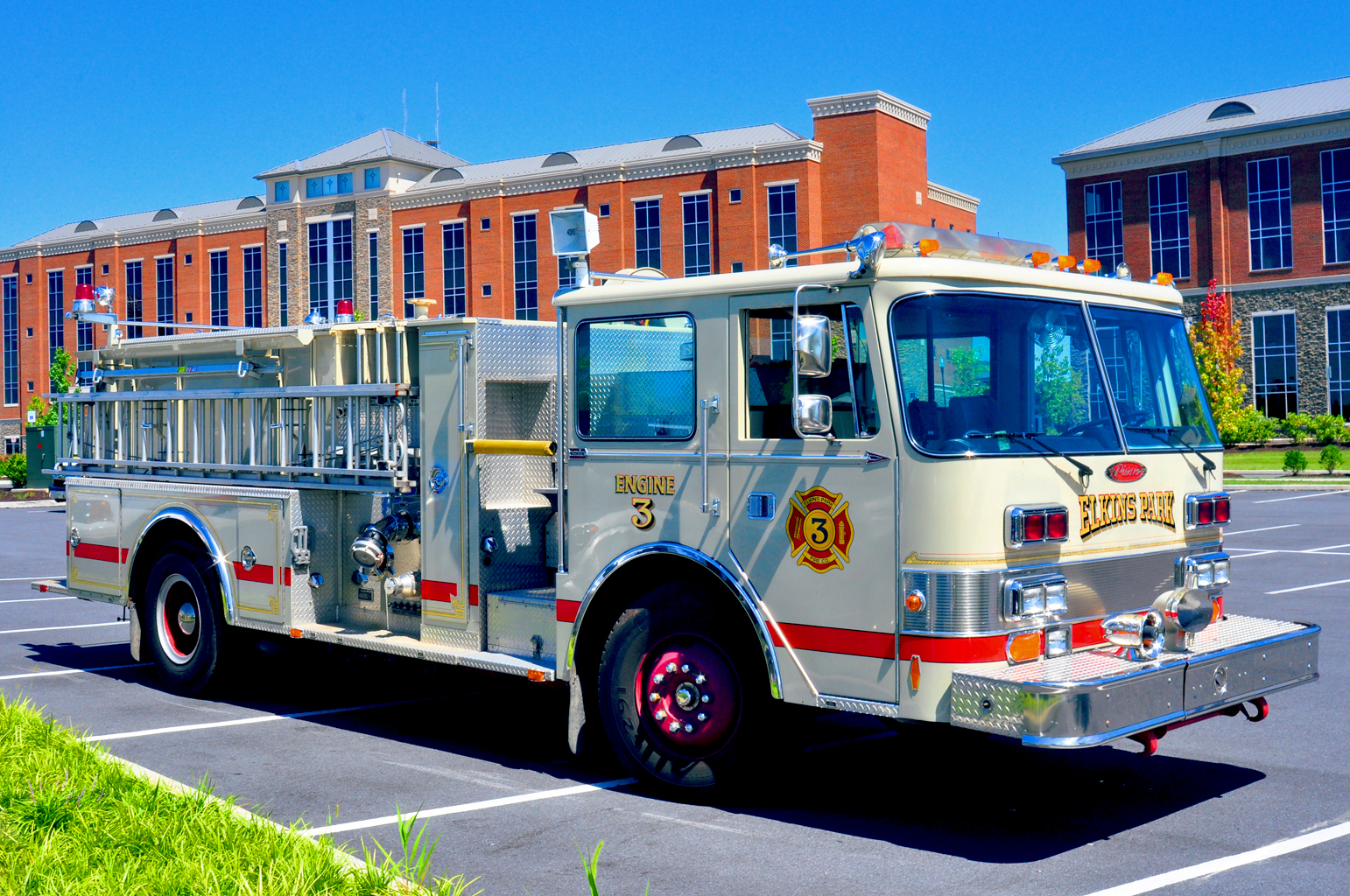
Elkins Park Fire Company Engine 3 in 1997

==== Regional Rail ====
Cheltenham is a major thoroughfare for SEPTA Regional Rail. All trains going north of Center City (with the exception of the Trenton Line) pass through Cheltenham. This includes the Airport Line, Lansdale/Doylestown Line, West Trenton Line, Warminster Line and the Fox Chase Line. Following Cheltenham, many of the lines split to their respective destinations, which makes Cheltenham stations some of the busiest in Montgomery County. The stations carry the names of the neighborhoods in which they are located: Elkins Park, Glenside, and Melrose Park. Jenkintown-Wyncote and Cheltenham straddle the township's border.

Station	Lines	Zone	Bus Connections	Weekday Boardings (2013)
Cheltenham	Fox Chase Line	2	70, 18, 24	368
Elkins Park	Airport Line Lansdale/Doylestown Line Warminster Line West Trenton Line	2	28	587
Jenkintown-Wyncote	Airport Line Lansdale/Doylestown Line Warminster Line West Trenton Line	3	77	1655
Melrose Park	Airport Line Lansdale/Doylestown Line Warminster Line West Trenton Line	2	28	505
Glenside	Airport Line Lansdale/Doylestown Line Warminster Line	3	22, 77	1230

==== Buses ====
Cheltenham is served by many SEPTA City Division buses. Many of the buses originate at the Cheltenham-Ogontz Bus Loop, which is located at the northwest corner of the intersection of Ogontz Avenue (Pennsylvania Route 309) and Cheltenham Avenue. The loop is across the street from Greenleaf at Cheltenham, which attracts many shoppers from North Philadelphia. Several other buses run throughout other major streets in the township, as well as residential streets. The following routes are in Cheltenham:

- 6 – connects Cheltenham-Ogontz with Olney Transit Center via Broad Street.
- 16 – connects Cheltenham-Ogontz with Center City at 15th and Market (Suburban Station) via Broad Street.
- 18 – third busiest bus route in the SEPTA system, connects Cedarbrook Shopping Center with Fox Chase via Olney.
- 22 – connects Willow Grove and Warminster to Olney Transit Center via Easton Road.
- 24 – connects Rockledge and Southampton with Frankford Transit Center via Huntingdon Pike.
- 28 – connects Fern Rock Transit Center with Torresdale-Cottman via Rhawn Street.
- 55 – connects Willow Grove and Doylestown with Olney Transit Center via Easton and Old York Road.
- 57 – connects Whitman Plaza with Rising Sun/Olney or Fern Rock via 3rd & 4th Street.
- 70 – connects Fern Rock with Frankford-Gregg via Cottman Avenue
- 71 – connects Cheltenham-Ogontz with Broad-Erie via West Mount Airy
- 72 – connects Cedarbrook Shopping Center with Frankford Transit Center via Cheltenham Avenue
- 77 – connects Chestnut Hill with Roosevelt Boulevard via Township Line Road
- 81 – connects Cheltenham-Ogontz with Broad-Erie via Germantown.

Cheltenham ranked in the top three municipalities in Montgomery County for percentage of population who uses Bus/Trolley and Regional Rail.

In addition, Cheltenham Township partners with the Montgomery County-sponsored Suburban Transit Network, Inc. (TransNet) to subsidize free transportation for residents ages 65 and older anywhere in the Township on Mondays through Fridays from 9 am to 3:30 pm.

As of 2016 Taiwanese airline EVA Air provides a private bus service to and from John F. Kennedy International Airport in New York City for customers based in the Philadelphia area. It stops in Cheltenham.

==== Roads ====
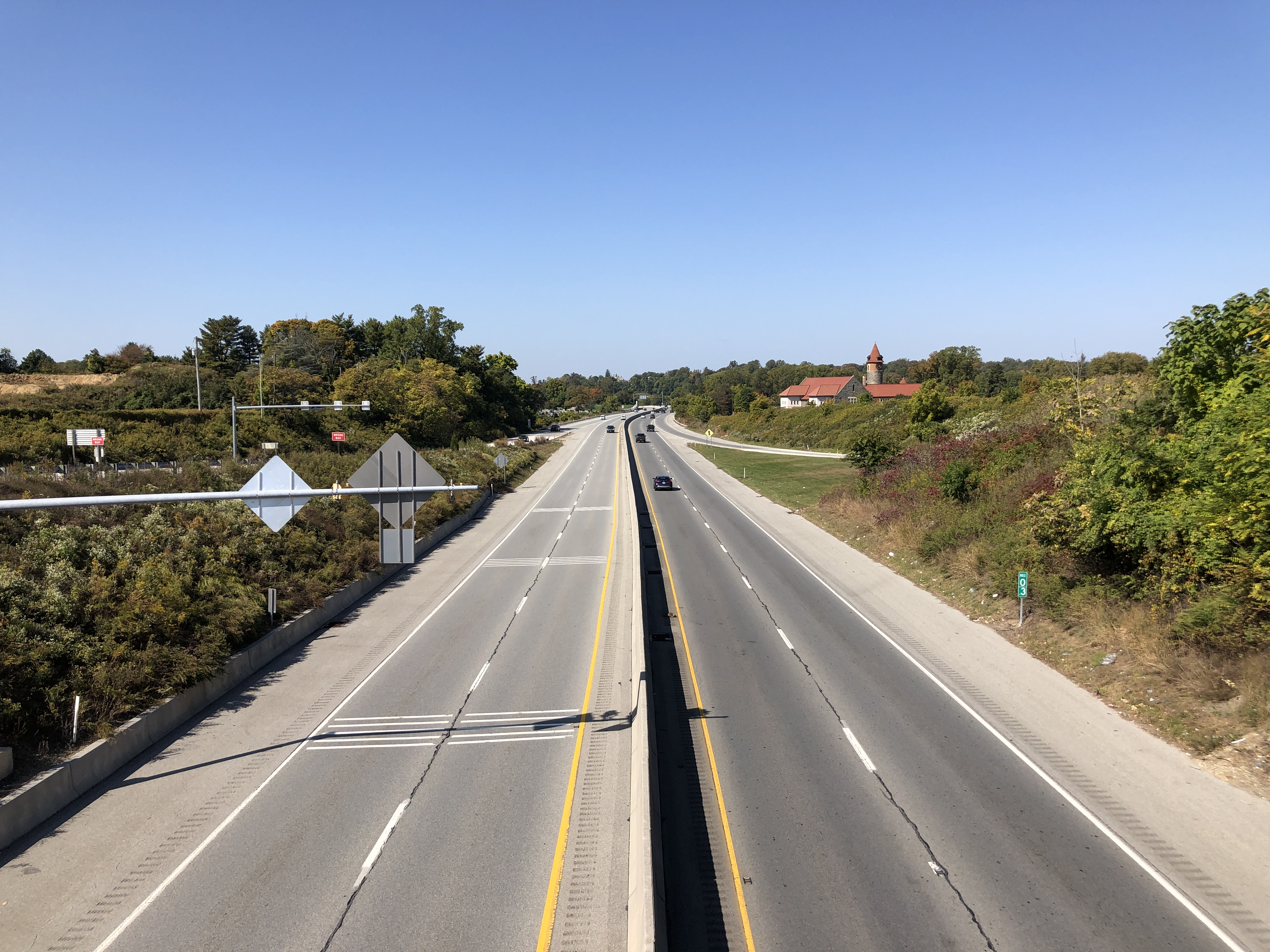
PA 309 northbound at PA Route 152 in Cheltenham Township

As of 2019, there were 124.14 miles (199.78 km) of public roads in Cheltenham Township, of which 26.93 miles (43.34 km) were maintained by the Pennsylvania Department of Transportation (PennDOT) and 97.21 miles (156.44 km) were maintained by the township.

There are several major roads in Cheltenham Township. Cheltenham Avenue is a major roadway and is an easy access point to many of the other roadways like Pennsylvania Route 611 and Pennsylvania Route 309. It is also the border between Cheltenham Township, Montgomery County, Pennsylvania and the City of Philadelphia, Philadelphia County, Pennsylvania. Cheltenham Avenue ends on the westside at Paper Mill Road in Wyndmoor, Pennsylvania which is part of Springfield Township. Pennsylvania Route 73 is one of the major roadways in Cheltenham Township, known as 'Church Road' and 'Township Line Road' because it is the border line between Cheltenham and Abington Townships. Pennsylvania Route 309 starts in Cheltenham Township and serves as a major highway. It goes through multiple counties and ends up in PA 29 in Monroe Township in Wyoming County. Pennsylvania Route 152 starts in Cheltenham Township and is known as 'Limekiln Pike.' It ends on the north end of Pennsylvania Route 309 in Telford. Pennsylvania Route 611 starts in Philadelphia and runs through Cheltenham Township as Old York Road. It is the main access road to Willow Grove in Abington and Upper Moreland Townships.

Many of the roads in Philadelphia continue into Cheltenham such as Old York Road, Willow Grove Avenue, Limekiln Pike, Ogontz Avenue, Washington Lane, 12th Street, Oak Lane, Oak Lane Road, 2nd Street, Hasbrook Avenue, Cottman Avenue, Central Avenue, Ryers Avenue and Church Road.

Cheltenham was one of several communities in Pennsylvania to make the United States Main Street Program. Locations receiving this honor were:

- Glenside – Easton Road from Arcadia University north to Mt. Carmel Avenue, and Glenside Avenue between Limekiln Pike and Keswick Avenue, and Rices Mill Road and Glenside Avenue.
- Cheltenham Village – Central and Ryers Avenues between Cottman Avenue and Old Soldiers Road, and Cottman Avenue between Hasbrook Avenue and the Church Road vicinity.
- East Cheltenham Avenue – East Cheltenham Avenue from the SEPTA train tracks to Bell Mawr Road.
- Elkins Park East – High School Road and Montgomery Avenue area.
- Elkins Park West – Old York Road between Township Line Road and Chelten Hills Drive, and Church Road between Brookside Road and the train tracks.

== Government services ==
=== Fire services ===
The Cheltenham Township Fire Department consists of five all volunteer fire companies.

- Glenside Fire Company
- La Mott Fire Company
- Elkins Park Fire Company
- Cheltenham Hook & Ladder Company
- Ogontz Fire Company (Closed and decertified by the Township Commissioners on December 16, 2020)

=== Police ===
The Cheltenham Police Department was founded in 1903. In 2008, the department responded to over 25,000 calls. With 73 full-time sworn officers in 2016, the department is the third largest in Montgomery County.

In 2016, a member of canine unit, Odie, was the top-ranked explosives detection dog in the United States.

=== Libraries ===
Cheltenham Township has four libraries, which are the East Cheltenham Free Library, Elkins Park Free Library, La Mott Free Library, and the Glenside Free library.

== Notable people ==
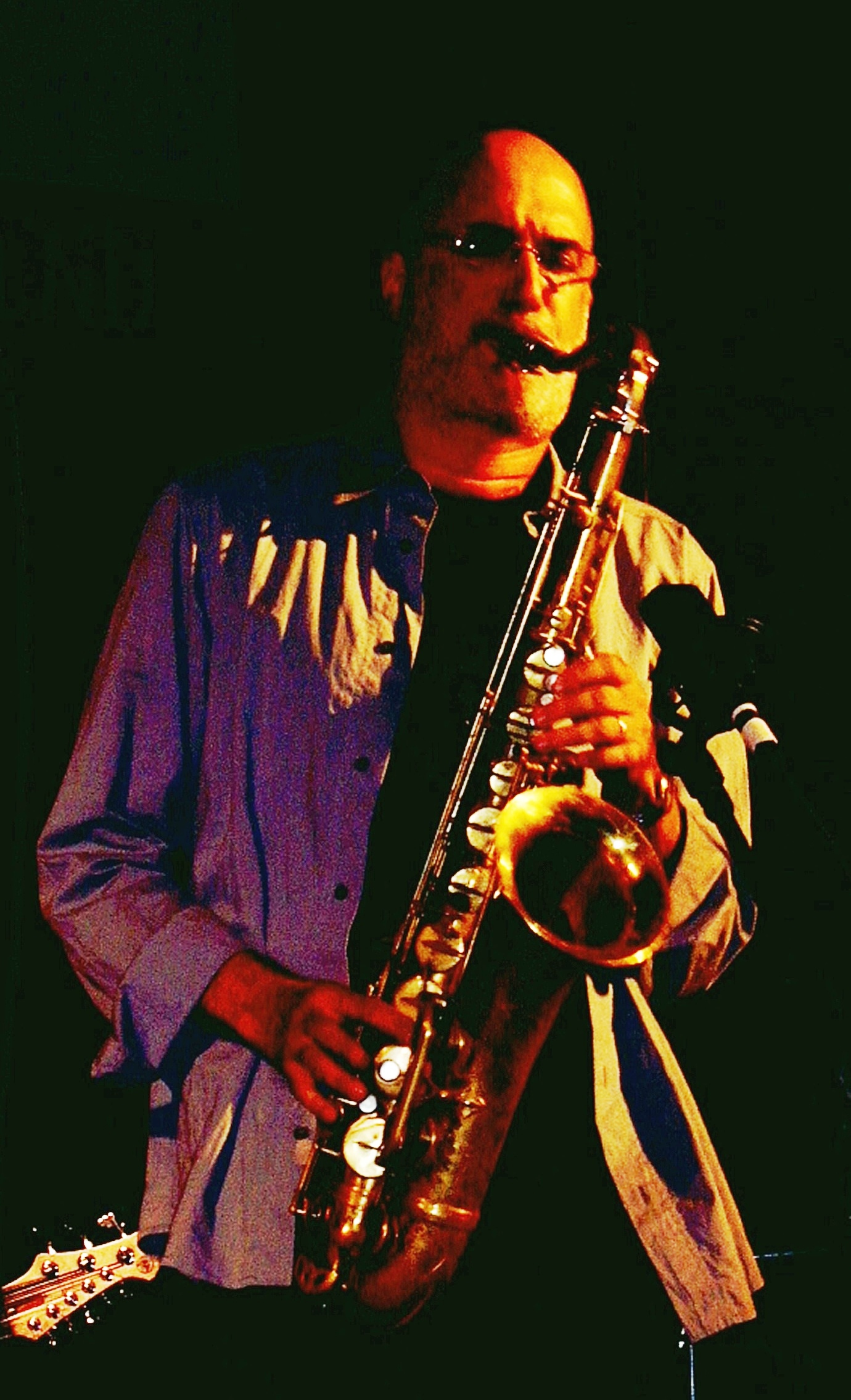
Michael Brecker

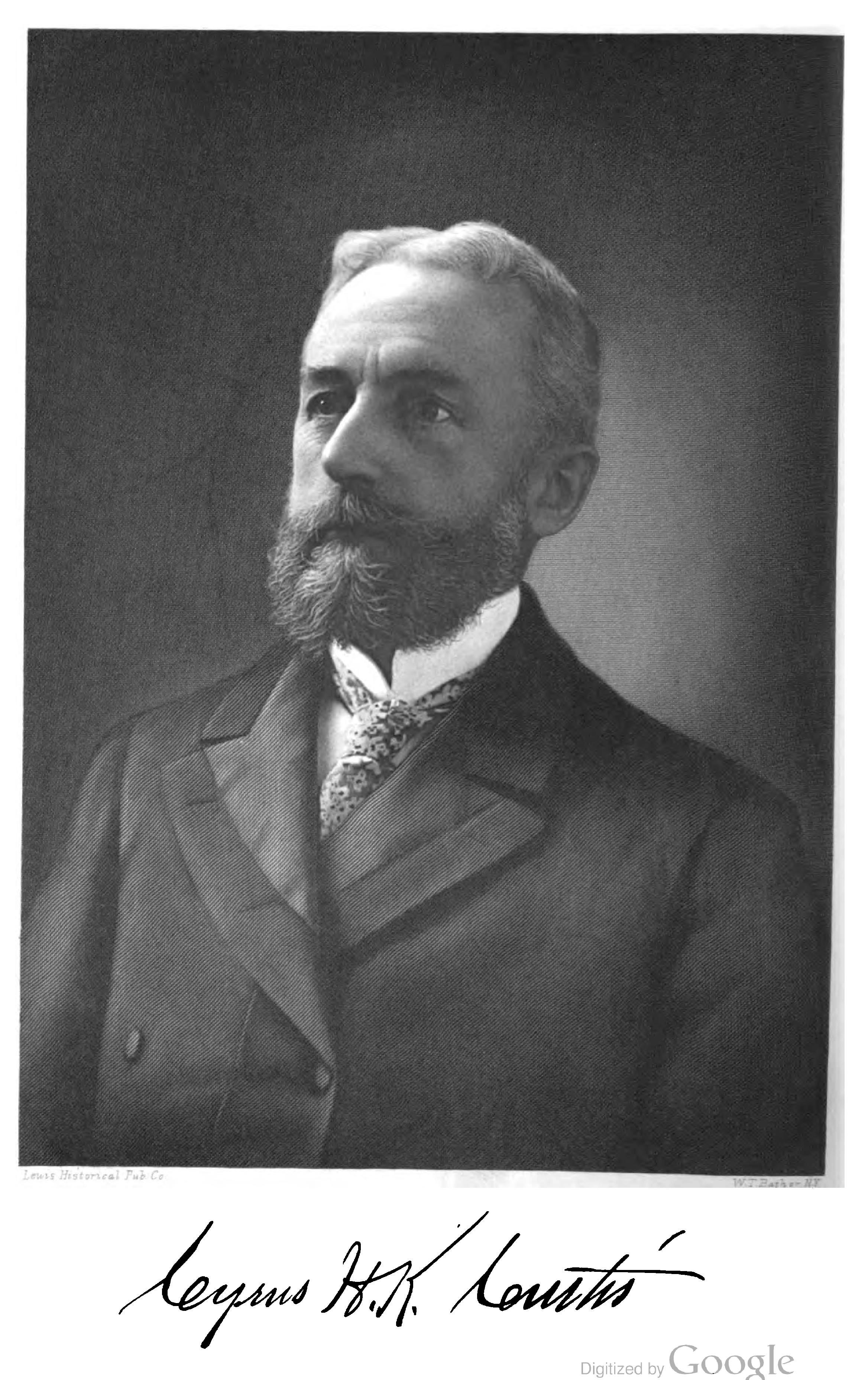
Cyrus H. K. Curtis

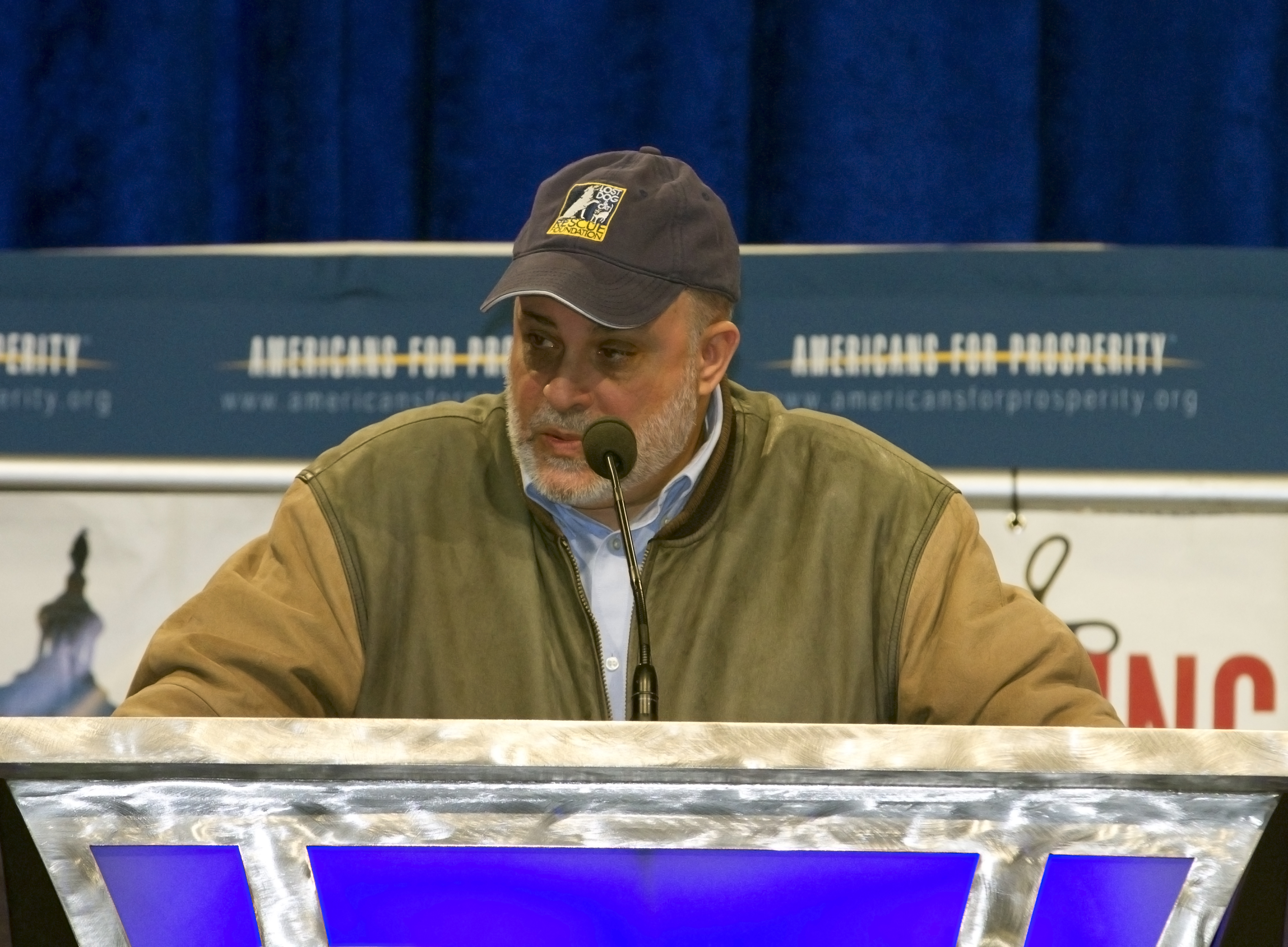
Mark Levin

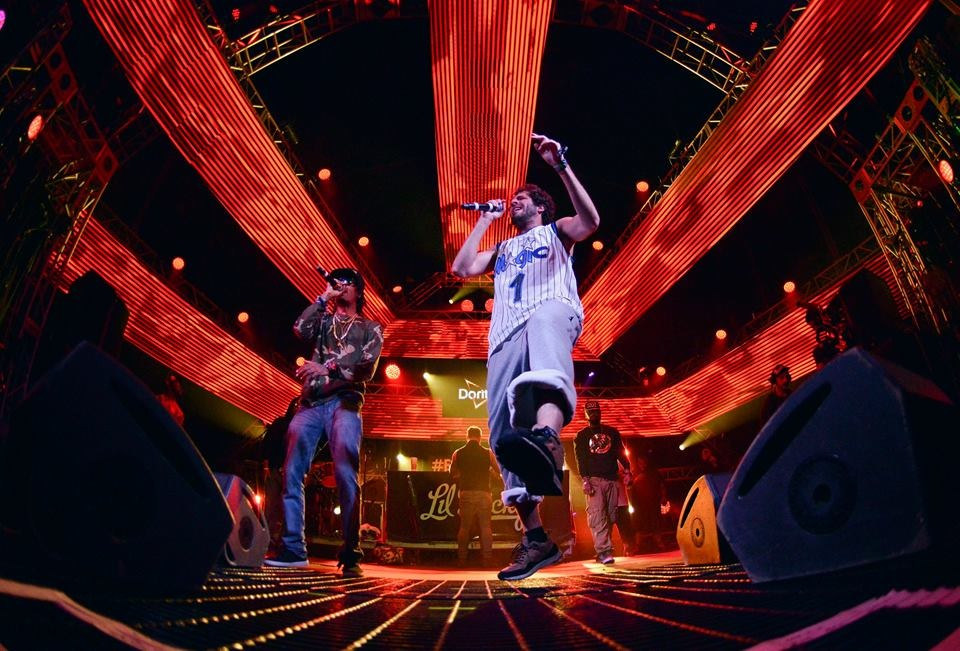
Lil Dicky

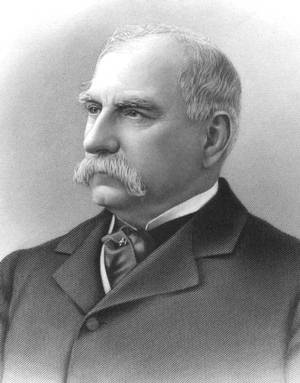
William Lukens Elkins

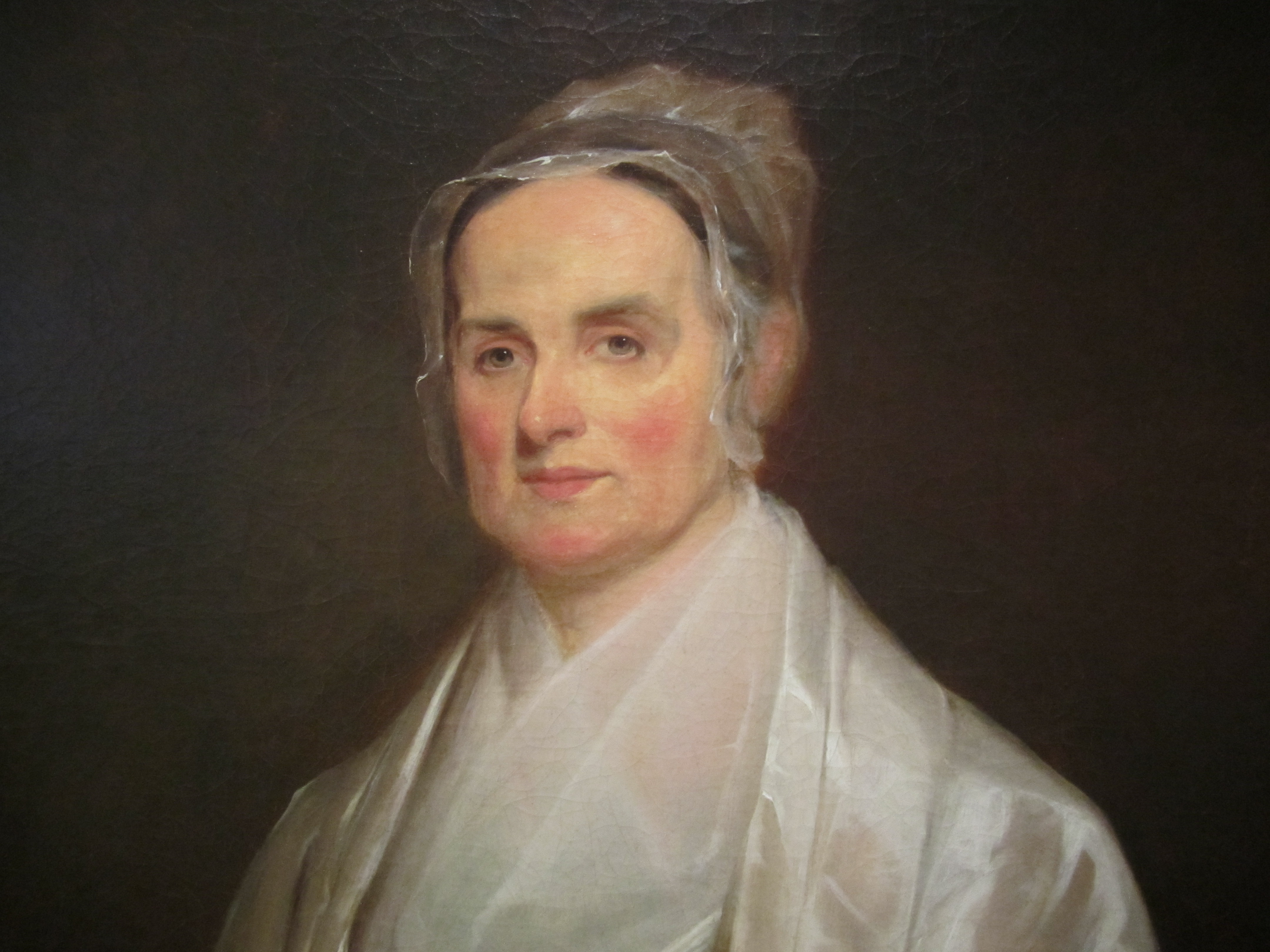
Lucretia Mott

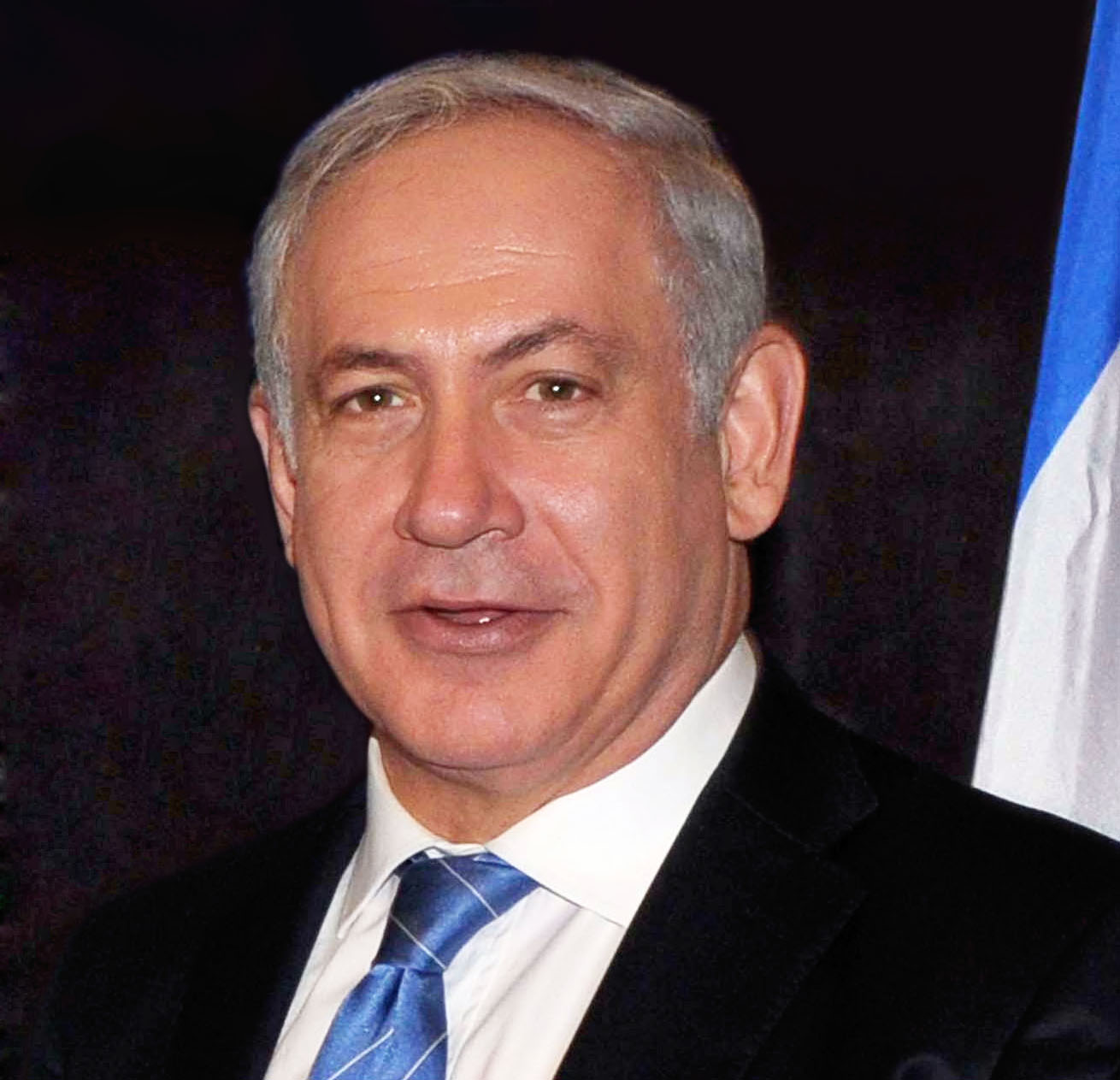
Benjamin Netanyahu

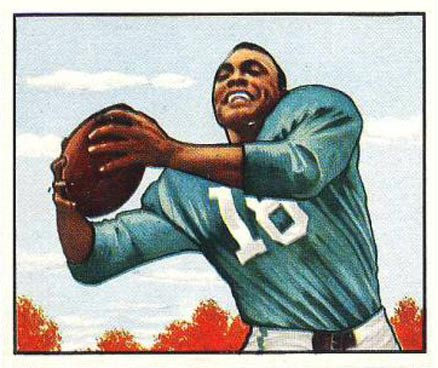
Wallace Triplett

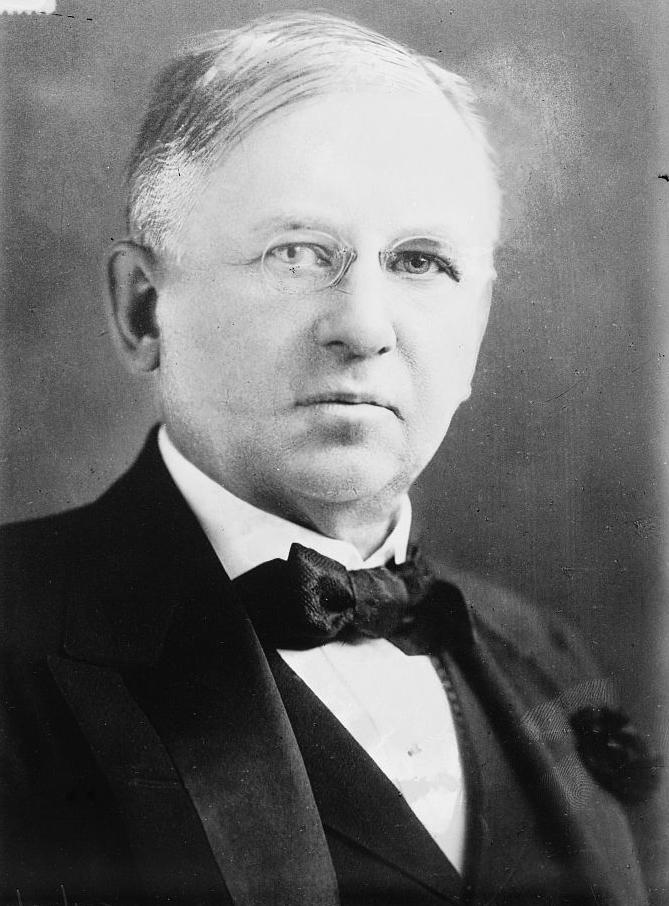
John Wanamaker

- Jay Ansill, composer and folk musician
- Eddie Applegate, actor
- Samuel Arbuckle, California politician, served on the Los Angeles County Board of Supervisors
- Abraham Barker, soldier during the Civil War, U.S. House of Representatives member
- Chris Bartlett, activist and executive director of William Way Community Center
- Michael Baylson, Senior Federal Judge on the United States District Court for the Eastern District of Pennsylvania
- Brandon Bing, professional football player for the New York Giants
- Robert Hood Bowers, composer and conductor
- Michael Brecker, saxophonist
- Randy Brecker, jazz, rock, and R&B trumpeter
- Justin Brown, NFL wide receiver
- Michael Stuart Brown, physician, geneticist, and Nobel laureate
- Jim Callahan, NFL player, writer, and member of the Temple University Hall of Fame
- Ibraheim Campbell, Cleveland Browns safety, Northwestern football alumni
- George Castle, son of J.R. Castle, professional lacrosse player for the Philadelphia Wings
- J.R. Castle, former lacrosse player
- Noam Chomsky, theoretical linguist and political activist
- Laurie Colwin, author and columnist
- Chris Conlin, All-American football player at Penn State
- Jay Cooke, financier – had his "country estate" in Chelten Hills
- Bill Cosby, comedian
- Rebecca Creskoff, actress
- Cyrus H. K. Curtis, founder of the Curtis Publishing Company, which published The Saturday Evening Post and Ladies Home Journal
- Louisa Knapp Curtis, columnist and first editor of Ladies Home Journal
- Fitz Eugene Dixon Jr., son of banker Fitz Eugene Dixon Sr. and Eleanor Widener (member of the Widener family)
- Tony Donatelli, soccer player for VSI Tampa Bay FC
- William Lukens Elkins, prominent role in history of the Pennsylvania Railroad, SEPTA and several other railroads.
- Josh Fattal, hiker detained in Iran from 2009 to 2011
- Tom Feeney, member of Congress, R-FL
- Douglas Feith, former Under-Secretary of Defense
- Stuart F. Feldman, co-founder of Vietnam Veterans of America.
- Marian Filar, Polish-born American-based concert pianist and virtuoso
- Glenn A. Fine, Inspector General, United States Department of Justice
- Wilmot E. Fleming, State Senator
- Jim Foster, Hall of Fame women's basketball coach at St. Joseph's, Vanderbilt, Ohio State, and Chattanooga.
- Jon D. Fox, U.S. Congressman
- Benjamin Hallowell, first president of the Maryland Agricultural College
- Laura Harper, professional basketball player
- Marvin Harrison, NFL wide receiver
- Alfred Hunt, first president of the Bethlehem Iron Company, later to become Bethlehem Steel
- Trina Schart Hyman, artist and illustrator
- Bill Hyndman, amateur golfer
- Clifford C. Ireland, U.S. Representative
- Reggie Jackson, Hall of Fame baseball player and actor – grew up in township
- Charles Wellford Leavitt, urban planner, architect, and engineer who designed Forbes Field and much of Columbia University
- Mark Levin, conservative talk radio host and attorney
- Richard Levinson, Emmy Award-winning writer and producer
- Chad Levitt, NFL football player
- Franz Lidz, journalist whose memoir, Unstrung Heroes, became a 1995 feature film directed by Diane Keaton
- Lil Dicky, born Dave Burd, rapper and comedian
- William Link, Emmy Award-winning writer and producer
- Craig Littlepage, college administrator and educator
- John Luther Long, lawyer and writer, best known for short story "Madame Butterfly"
- Jeff Lorber, musician
- George Horace Lorimer, longtime editor of The Saturday Evening Post
- Bernie Lowe, founder of Cameo Records
- Joel Keith Mann, PA House Representative, PA State Senator, U.S. House of Representatives
- Mary Ellen Mark, photographer
- John Charles Martin, newspaper publisher
- Edgar Lee Masters, lawyer and author of the Spoon River Anthology – spent final years and died in Elkins Park
- Steve McCarter, member of the Pennsylvania House of Representatives, representing the 154th legislative district
- Pat Meehan, US Politician representing Pennsylvania's 7th congressional district
- Humphrey Morrey, founder of Cheltenham, first Mayor of Philadelphia
- Lucretia Coffin Mott, prominent feminist, abolitionist, and Quaker)
- Robert J. Myers, co-creator of United States Social Security program
- Benjamin Netanyahu, currently serves his third term as Israeli prime minister – lived in township during high school
- Yonatan Netanyahu, Israeli soldier who died in Operation Entebbe
- Iddo Netanyahu, Israeli physician, author, playwright, brother of Benjamin Netanyahu and Yonatan Netanyahu
- Ron Perelman, businessman, 26th richest American
- Ezra Pound, poet – grew up in township
- Jesse Purnell, professional baseball player for the Philadelphia Phillies
- Ralph J. Roberts, co-founder of Comcast, father of current Comcast CEO, Brian L. Roberts
- David Saxon, physicist, educator and administrator
- Ronald M. Shapiro, sports agent, corporate attorney, New York Times best-selling author
- Robert C. Solomon, PhD, author and educator
- Jeffrey Solow, virtuoso cellist
- Jeffrey Sonnenfeld, Senior Associate Dean for Executive Programs and Lester Crown Professor in the Practice of Management at Yale
- Dan Trachtenberg, filmmaker and podcast host. He directed the 2016 horror-thriller film 10 Cloverfield Lane
- Wallace Triplett, professional football player
- David Uosikkinen, drummer for rock band The Hooters
- Kate Vrijmoet, artist
- John Wanamaker, businessman sometimes called the father of the department store – had a second home in the township
- Richard Ward, actor
- Paul Westhead, NBA championship-winning coach, taught English at Cheltenham High School in the 1960s
- Thomas Wharton Jr., first Governor of Pennsylvania
- George Dunton Widener, Philadelphia businessman who died in the sinking of the Titanic
- George Dunton Widener Jr., businessman, thoroughbred horse racer
- Gertrude Widener, thoroughbred racehorse owner and breeder
- Harry Elkins Widener, businessman who died on the Titanic; Harvard University's Widener Memorial Library was built in his honor
- Joseph E. Widener, businessman, founding benefactor of National Gallery of Art
- Peter A. B. Widener, head of the prominent Widener family
- Chris Williams, professional soccer player for Miami FC
- George Wilson, Hall of Fame collegiate football player
- Stan Yerkes, professional baseball player

== Fictional residents ==
- Betty Draper, Mad Men character who was raised in the "tiny Philadelphia suburb of Elkins Park, Pennsylvania."
- Danny and Maeve Conroy, characters in the book "The Dutch House" by Ann Patchett. The novel is set in Elkins Park, Pennsylvania.

== Miscellaneous ==
- Cheltenham has its own Public-access television cable TV channel, Channel 42 (Cheltenham School District/Township) on Comcast Cablevision and Channel 1960 on Verizon FiOS.
- The Fox sitcom 'Til Death is set in Cheltenham.
- The movie The in Crowd was filmed partly at Cheltenham High School.

== Cheltenham, England ==
Cheltenham is officially twinned with their namesake, Cheltenham, England.

== Points of interest ==
	Site name	Image	Location	Year Built	Comment
1	Curtis Arboretum		1250 West Church Road	1937	Former home of Cyrus H. K. Curtis
2	Camptown Historic District		La Mott	1860s	Major Stop on Underground Railroad, Housed Camp William Penn
3	Grey Towers Castle		Glenside	1893	Now part of Arcadia University
4	Milmoral		1150 Church Road	1905	Adjacent to Curtis Arboretum
5	Wall House		Wall Park Drive, Elkins Park	1682	Oldest House in Pennsylvania, 2nd Oldest Building in Pennsylvania
6	Beth Sholom Synagogue		8231 Old York Road	1954	Only Synagogue ever designed by famed architect Frank Lloyd Wright
7	St. Paul's Episcopal Church		Old York Road	1861	Conceived and designed by Cheltenham resident Jay Cooke with later additions by Horace Trumbauer
8	Rowland House		300 Ashbourne Road	1774	Also known as the Shovel Shop
9	Glenside Memorial Hall		185 South Keswick Avenue	1926	Built to Honor World War I Veterans, now honors all Veterans
10	Elkins Railroad Station		7879 Spring Avenue	1898	Originally Built by the Reading Railroad
11	George K. Heller School		439 Ashbourne Road	1883	Now the Cheltenham Arts Center
12	Henry West Breyer Sr. House		8230 Old York Road	1915	Now the Cheltenham Township Building
13	Wyncote Historic District		Wyncote	1896	Many homes designed by famed local architect, Frank Furness. The district contains 178 contributing properties.
14	Jenkintown-Wyncote Station		Wyncote	1872	Originally built by the North Pennsylvania Railroad, part of the Wyncote Historic District

=== Pennsylvania Historic Site ===
- Camp William Penn

=== Other points of interest ===
- Lynnewood Hall
- Elkins Estate
- Holy Sepulchre Cemetery
- Tookany Creek

== See also ==
- Koreatown, Philadelphia
- U.S. cities with large African-American populations

Preceded by Springfield Township	Bordering communities of Philadelphia	Succeeded by Abington
