= Milmoral =

Historic house in Pennsylvania, United States

- U.S. National Register of Historic Places
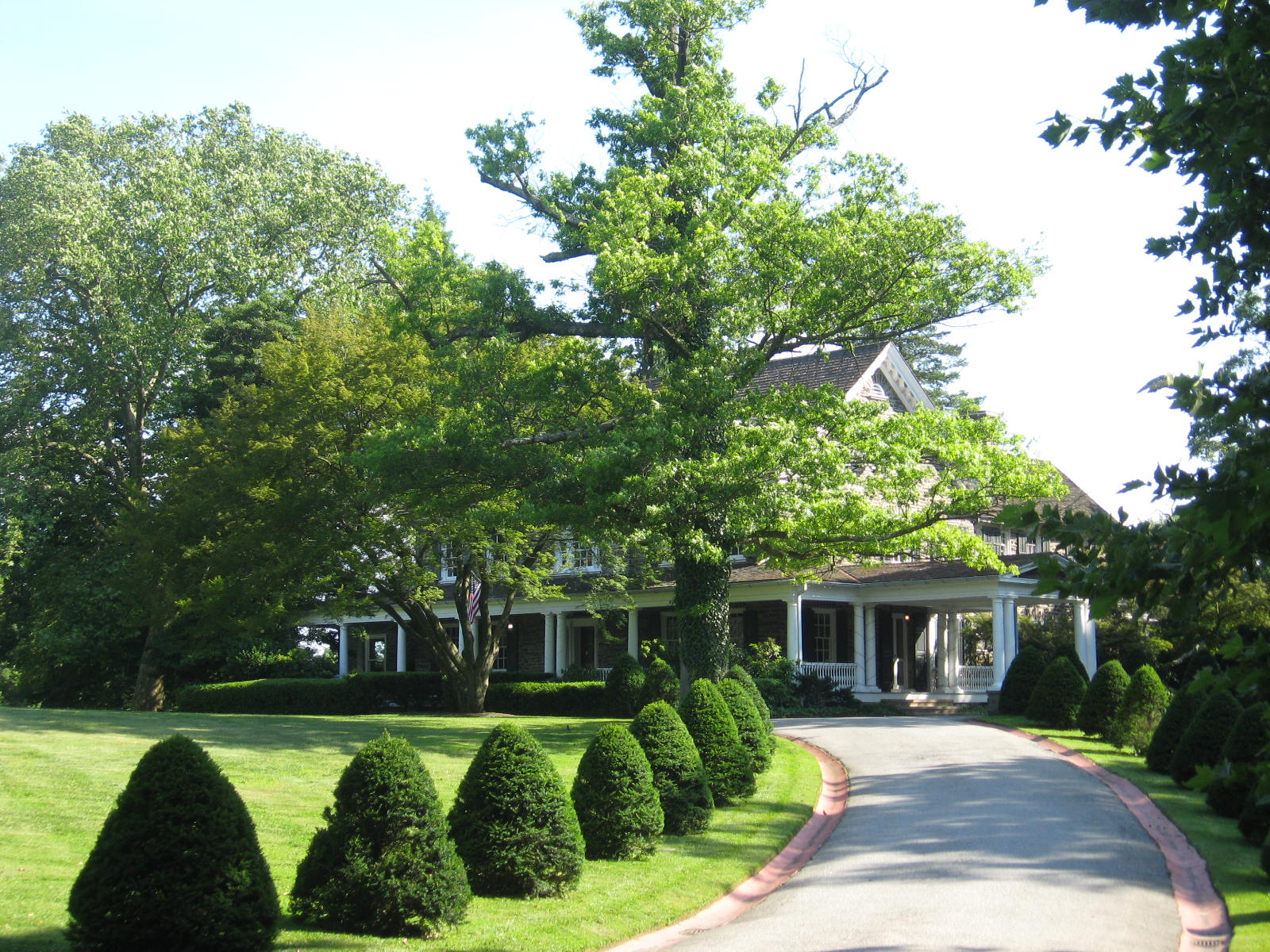
- Milmoral as viewed from Church Road

- Location within Philadelphia Location within Pennsylvania Location within the United States
- Location: 1150 Church Rd., Wyncote, Cheltenham Township, Pennsylvania
- Coordinates: 40°5′2″N 75°8′47″W
- Area: 6.1 acres (2.5 ha)
- Built: 1905–1906, 1912
- Architect: Edwin H. Fetterolf
- Architectural style: Colonial Revival
- NRHP reference No.: 02001746
- Added to NRHP: January 31, 2003

Milmoral, also known as the H.G. Fetterolf House, John & Elizabeth Eagleson House and Ruth Nissen House, is an historic home that is located in Cheltenham Township, Montgomery County, Pennsylvania, United States.

It was added to the National Register of Historic Places in 2003.

== History and architectural features ==
Built between 1905 and 1906, this historic structure is a 2 1/2-story, five-bay, L-shaped dwelling that was designed in the Colonial Revival style. It was built using Wissahickon schist and was remodeled and enlarged in 1912. This house features a hipped roof and a wraparound porch that are supported by Doric order columns. Also located on the property are a contributing stable/carriage house and greenhouse.
