= Drexel University Elkins Park Campus =

Private university in Elkins Park, Pennsylvania, US

Drexel University, Elkins Park Campus
- Former names: Pennsylvania College of Optometry (1919-2008); Salus University (2009-2024)
- Type: Private graduate school
- Established: 1919; 107 years ago (PCO); July 1, 2008 (Salus)
- Parent institution: Drexel University
- Endowment: $49.1 million (2020)
- Academic staff: 377
- Postgraduates: 1,200+
- Location: Cheltenham Township, Pennsylvania, US; 40°5′10.8204″N 75°7′44.7924″W
- Campus: Suburban 11.5-acre main campus
- Website: www.salus.edu

Drexel University, Elkins Park Campus is a private graduate school in Elkins Park, Pennsylvania. A part of Drexel University, the Elkins Park Campus specializes in degree programs for the health care professions.

== History ==
The university's founding college, the Pennsylvania College of Optometry (PCO), which was founded as the Pennsylvania State College of Optometry (PSCO) in 1919, is one of the oldest optometry colleges in North America. The decision to establish the college was reached at an annual conference of the Pennsylvania Optical Society in 1918. PCO was the first school in the U.S. to confer the legislature-approved Doctor of Optometry (OD) degree after its four-year educational program.

In 1975, PCO was the first college of optometry to develop a comprehensive, off-campus externship program. Later that year, the college began construction on its main clinical facility, The Eye Institute (TEI), which opened in 1978 to serve as a training site for the school's optometry students and as a community vision care center for the public. At the time of its opening, this was the first interdisciplinary clinical facility at an optometry school centered around patient care with graduate students. Presently, TEI has two locations with the main clinical facility in West Oak Lane and a satellite location in Chestnut Hill.

In 2000, PCO became the first school of optometry in the county to offer a Doctor of Audiology (AuD) degree when it received approval by the Commonwealth of Pennsylvania. By 2003, PCO had created a distance education program for licensed and practicing audiologists called AuD online and was finalizing construction of a new building to be used by students enrolled in the AuD curriculum by their commencement. The Pennsylvania Ear Institute (PEI), the clinical facility of the program, was opened on November 19, 2004, shortly before the school's first class of AuD students would begin their four-year curriculum. As of 2017, Salus alumni comprise more than 23 percent of all audiologists in the U.S.

The change in name from PCO to Salus University occurred on July 1, 2008. The name Salus, a Latin word for health and well-being, was unanimously chosen by the university board of trustees as "an expression of the institution's dedication to the preservation of the health and well-being of the communities its graduates serve." At this time, the university's College of Audiology was also renamed to the George S. Osborne College of Audiology (OCA) in the memory of Dr. Osborne who was a key individual in the development of the AuD degree program as well as dean of OCA. Over the years, the university has added programs such as Physician Assistant Studies (PA), Occupational Therapy (OT), Biomedicine and Speech-Language Pathology (SLP). In 2015, the Speech-Language Institute (SLI) opened as the clinical facility for the university's SLP program.

The previous university consisted of three colleges: Pennsylvania College of Optometry; Osborne College of Audiology; and the College of Health Sciences, Education and Rehabilitation.

On June 13, 2023, it was announced that Salus would merge into Drexel University pending regulatory and judicial approval. In 2024, the merger was completed.

== Campus ==
The campus is in Cheltenham Township, and in the Elkins Park census-designated place.

== Clinical facilities ==
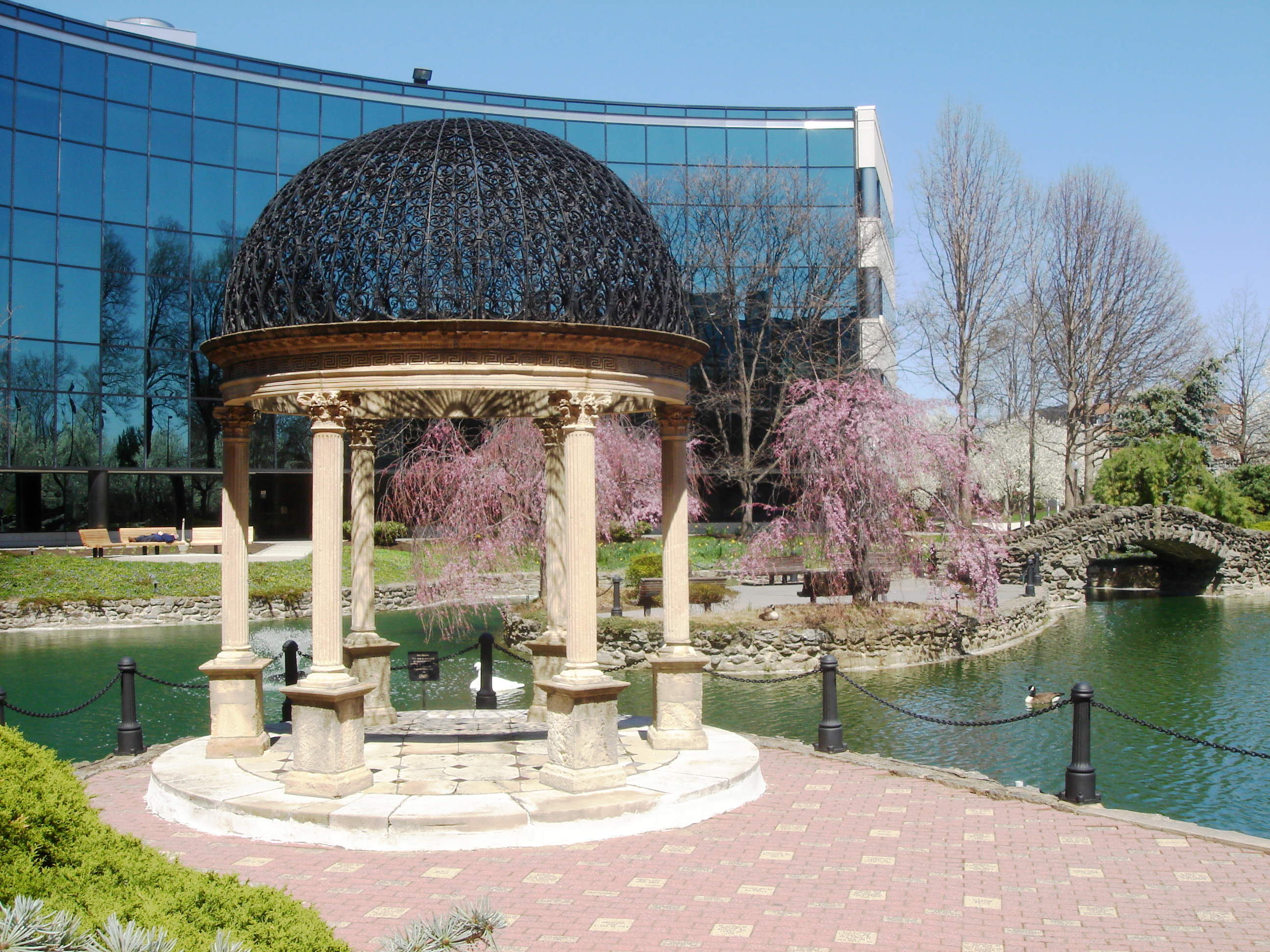
Courtyard of the campus at Cheltenham Township

=== Optometry ===
The Eye Institute (TEI) was established in 1978 in the West Oak Lane section of Philadelphia, and in 2010 completed renovation. In addition to its main West Oak Lane clinical facility, TEI has a satellite location in the Chestnut Hill section of Philadelphia.

=== Audiology ===
Established in 2004, Pennsylvania Ear Institute (PEI) is located at the school's Elkins Park campus in Pennsylvania and serves as a clinical site for Doctor of Audiology (AuD) students enrolled in the Osborne College of Audiology (OCA).

=== Speech-Language Pathology ===
The Speech-Language Institute (SLI) is the clinical facility for students enrolled in the university's Speech-Language Pathology (SLP) master's degree program. The institute opened in July 2015 at the university's main campus in Elkins Park, Pennsylvania.

=== Occupational Therapy ===
The Occupational Therapy Institute (OTI) was opened Spring 2021 in West Oak Lane in Philadelphia, within The Eye Institute of Salus University. It is a clinical facility for students enrolled in the university's Occupational Therapy (OT) master's degree program.

== Curriculum ==
By the end of the 4 years in Optometry school, a student can expect to have completed a total of 165 credits. The 165 credits are from a variety of classes that students have spent loads of hours studying for.

On top of classes, at Salus University, clinical exposure will happen within a student's first year. Optometry students can expect to be at 2 different clinical sites, and 5 externship sites throughout the four years. At The Eye Institute clinical site, students will be given chances to practice with patients of all age groups. Students will be able to start treating in the service delivery system by the middle of the second academic year. Students will offer services including eye exams, vision therapy, contact lenses and much more. At The Eye Institute clinical site, students will help manage more than 40,000 annual patient visits. To reduce course loads on students, Salus has removed semesters and replaced it with an all-year-round curriculum.
