= Eleanor Elkins Widener =

American heiress (1861–1937)

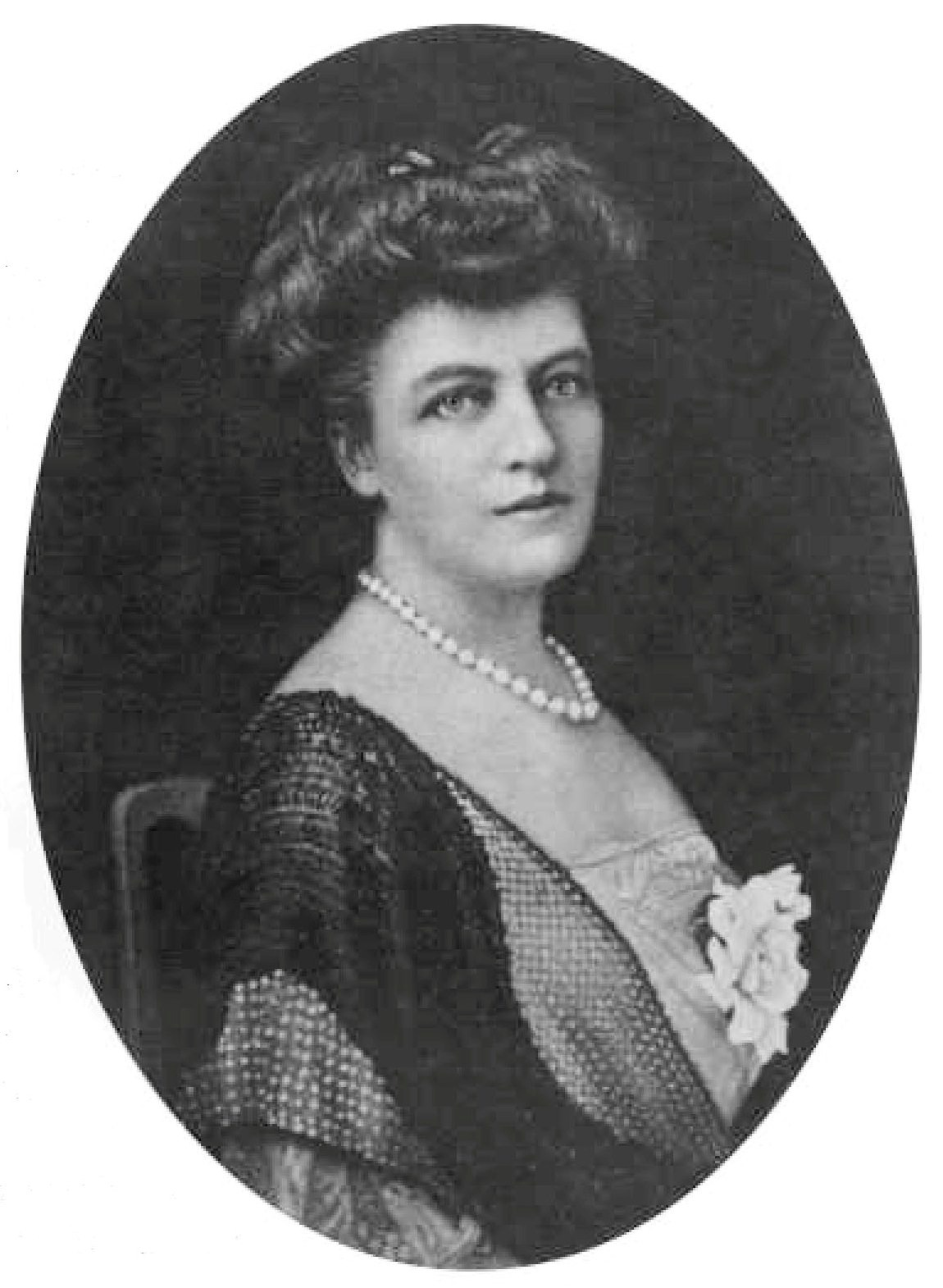
- Born: Eleanore Elkins (Note: "The December 31, 1912 agreement between Widener and Harvard University, regarding her donation of Widener Library, and the family genealogy spell Mrs. Widener's given name with terminal 'e'; however, she appears to have dropped the 'e' for her personal use and consistently signed letters to Harvard President A. Lawrence Lowell without the 'e'."); September 21, 1861; Philadelphia, Pennsylvania, U.S.
- Died: July 13, 1937 (aged 75); Paris, France
- Resting place: Laurel Hill Cemetery, Philadelphia, Pennsylvania, U.S.
- Known for: Gift of Widener Library at Harvard University
- Spouses: George Dunton Widener (m. 1883; died 1912); Alexander Hamilton Rice (m. 1915)
- Children: Harry Elkins Widener; George Dunton Widener Jr.; Eleanor Widener Dixon
- Parents: William Lukens Elkins; Maria Louise Broomall

Eleanor Elkins Widener (September 21, 1861 - July 13, 1937) née Eleanore Elkins, also known as Eleanor Elkins Rice was an American heiress, socialite, philanthropist, and adventuress. She was the daughter of wealthy businessman William Lukens Elkins and married George Dunton Widener, the son of wealthy businessman Peter Arrell Browne Widener. She survived the 1912 sinking of the RMS Titanic but George and their son, Harry, did not. She renovated St. Paul's Episcopal Church in Elkins Park, Pennsylvania, as a memorial to George and donated $2 million to Harvard University to build the Widener Library as a memorial to Harry.

Widener remarried, to Harvard professor Alexander Hamilton Rice. She funded his research and accompanied him on a number of expeditions in South America, Europe and India. After her death, her grandson, Fitz Eugene Dixon Jr., had Penn Morton College in Chester, Pennsylvania, renamed Widener College in her honor.

== Early life ==
Widener was born September 21, 1861 in Philadelphia, Pennsylvania. Her father was the wealthy businessman William Lukens Elkins. She attended Vassar College for one year but left to marry George Dunton Widener, the son of William's business partner, Peter Arrell Browne Widener, on November 1, 1883.

They lived in the 110-room mansion, Lynnewood Hall, in Elkins Park. Their children were Harry Elkins Widener, George Dunton Widener Jr., and Eleanor Widener Dixon.

== Titanic survival and memorials ==
In March 1912, Widener traveled with George and Harry on the RMS Mauretania from New York to Liverpool, England. The trip was to ensure the safe arrival of 30 silver plates once owned by Nell Gwyn being donated to the London Museum. They subsequently traveled to Paris to purchase a wedding dress for Eleanor's upcoming marriage and search for a chef for their new hotel, the Ritz Carlton in Philadelphia.

On April 10 they embarked at Cherbourg on the RMS Titanic for their return to the United States. She traveled with a pearl necklace valued at $750,000. On the night the ship sank, they hosted a dinner in the À la Carte Restaurant attended by Captain Edward Smith, Archibald Butt, and John B. Thayer. George, Harry, and their valet died in the sinking, but Eleanor and her maid survived in Lifeboat 4 along with first-class female passengers Madeleine Astor, Emily Ryerson, and Marian Thayer. They were rescued by the RMS Carpathia after about 2 hours.

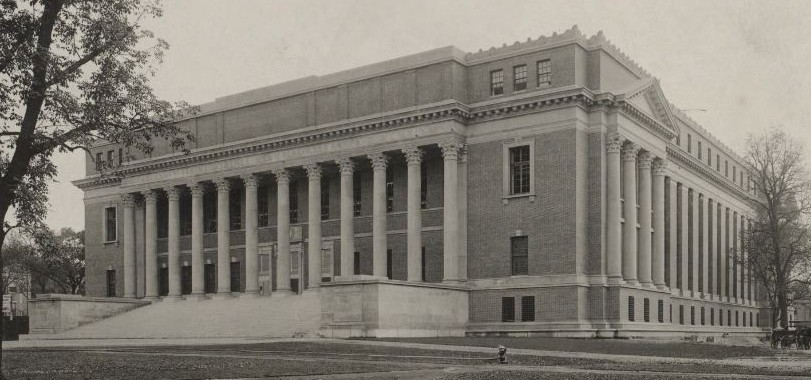
Eleanor donated $2 million to Harvard University to build the Widener Library as a memorial to her son Harry Elkins Widener who died during the sinking of the Titanic.

Widener returned to Philadelphia to recover and renovated St. Paul's Episcopal Church in Elkins Park as a memorial to George. She donated, at a cost of $2 million, the Harry Elkins Widener Memorial Library to Harvard University. Harry was a collector of rare and valuable books and had graduated from Harvard College in 1907. She asked Luther S. Livingston to be the first librarian of the Harry Elkins Widener Collection in the library. She gave a $300,000 science building to The Hill School, in Pottstown, Pennsylvania, where Harry had graduated in 1903.

== Second marriage and South American adventures ==
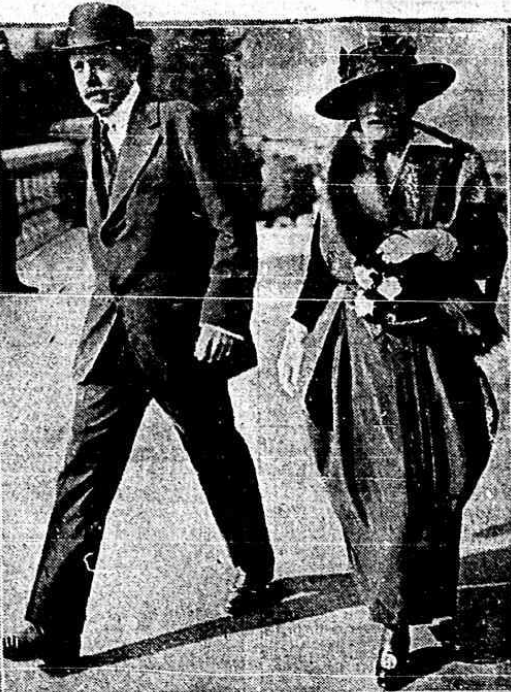
Widener with her second husband, Alexander Hamilton Rice, in 1920

At the library's June 1915 dedication, Widener met Harvard professor Alexander Hamilton Rice, a surgeon, South American explorer, and Boston Brahmin. In October 1915, she married him in a ceremony led by Bishop William Lawrence. They lived together at Miramar, a 30,000 square-foot mansion in Rhode Island.

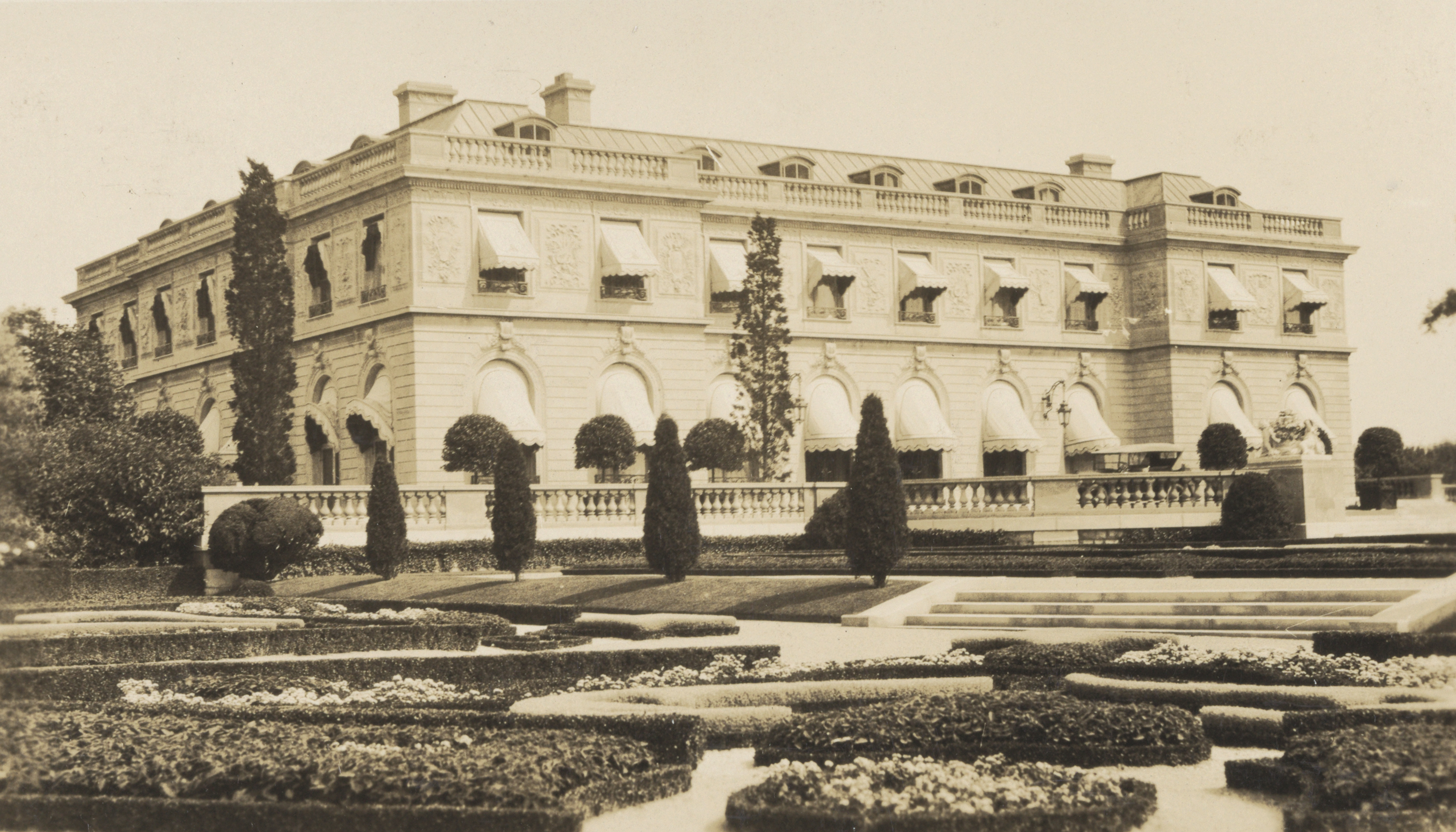
Widener and her second husband lived in the 30,000 square-foot Miramar mansion in Rhode Island.

Widener used her fortune to fund Rice's field work and accompanied him on several excursions in South America, Europe, and India. Their wedding trip included a voyage aboard a boat outfitted for a 5,000-mile journey through South America. They returned several times in search of the source of the Orinoco River to dispel a myth that a tribe of White Indians ruled the area. On one trip, Widener became the first white woman to enter the Rio Negro country, where she caused a great sensation among the natives. She was kindly treated and showered with gifts. She made many friends with the women of the tribes by her gifts of beads, knives and other trinkets. She received approval from the Brazilian government to study the women of the region and built schools for the children.

During a 1920 trip on the Amazon River, the party warded off an attack by "savages and killed two cannibals". Widener remained on the yacht during the attack. That particular trip was abandoned on the advice of their Indian guides, but the Rices ventured several more times into the jungles.

== Death and legacy ==
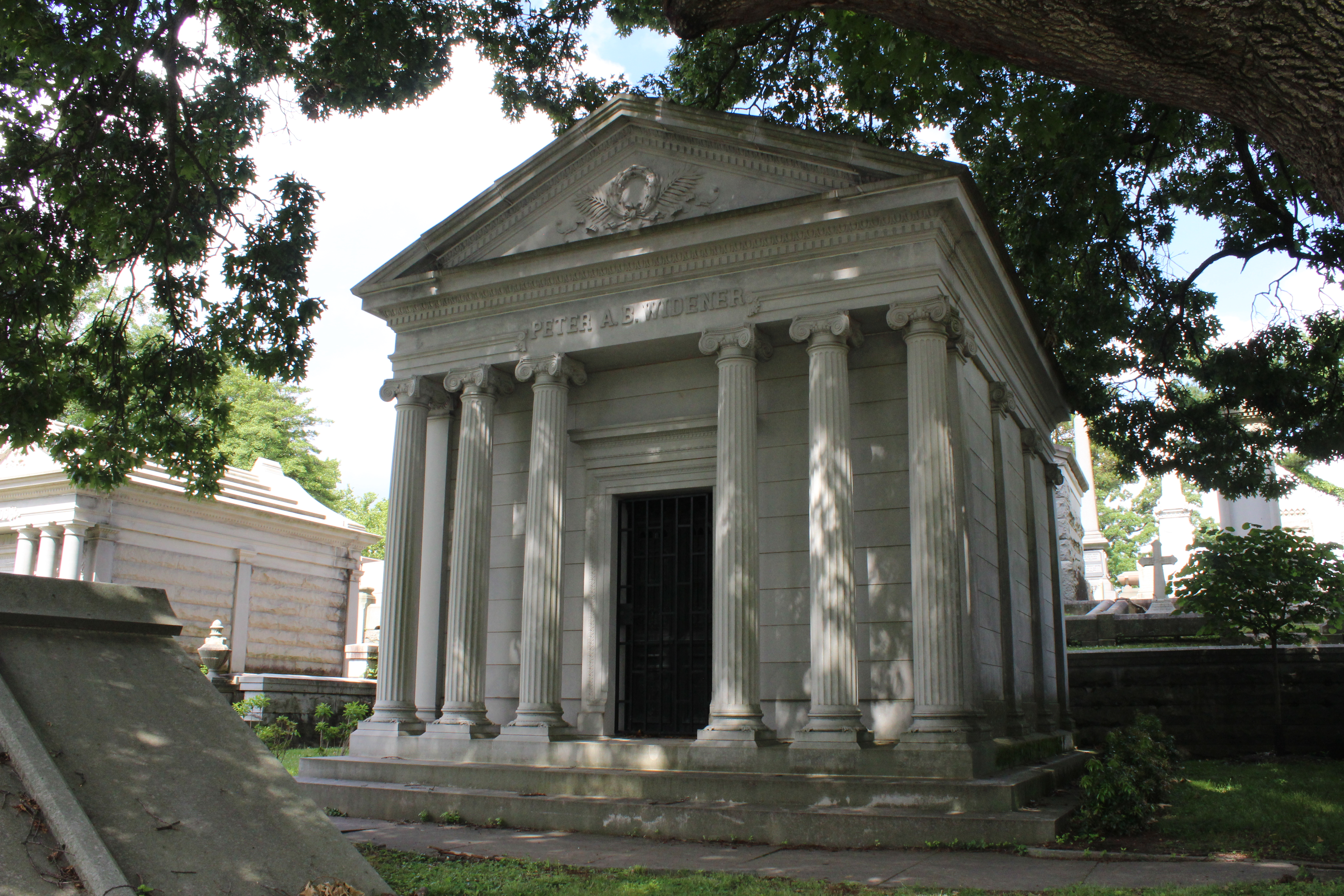
She was interred in the Widener Family Mausoleum in Laurel Hill Cemetery.

On July 13, 1937, Widener died of a heart attack in a Paris store and was interred at Laurel Hill Cemetery in Philadelphia in the Widener family mausoleum. Her crypt makes no mention of her Titanic survival, however, the cenotaphs to George and Harry in the same mausoleum mention the sinking. She left her fortune of $11 million, with minor exceptions, to a trust for the benefit of Rice, to pass on his death to her surviving son, George, and daughter, Eleanor.

Widener gave the furniture and contents of her Louis XVI drawing room from her New York City home on Fifth Avenue to the Pennsylvania Museum of Art.

Widener's grandson, Fitz Eugene Dixon Jr., requested that Penn Morton College in Chester, Pennsylvania, be renamed Widener College in honor of her.

== Portrayals ==
- Diana Kent (2012) Titanic; TV series
