= George D. Widener Jr. =

American thoroughbred horseracing owner and breeder (1889–1971)

- Born: March 11, 1889; Philadelphia, Pennsylvania, U.S.
- Died: December 8, 1971 (aged 82); Whitemarsh Township, Pennsylvania, U.S.
- Resting place: Laurel Hill Cemetery, Philadelphia, Pennsylvania, U.S.
- Occupations: Businessman, philanthropist, racehorse owner/breeder
- Spouse: Jessie Sloane Dodge (m. 1917; died 1968)
- Children: 1 stepdaughter
- Parent(s): George Dunton Widener & Eleanor Elkins Widener
- Honors: U. S. Racing Hall of Fame Exemplar of Racing; George D. Widener Hospital for Large Animals

George Dunton Widener Jr. (March 11, 1889 – December 8, 1971) was an American thoroughbred racing owner and breeder. He raised 102 stakes winners, won the Travers Stakes a record-tying five times, and was the first person designated an "Exemplar of Racing" by the National Museum of Racing and Hall of Fame.

== Early life ==
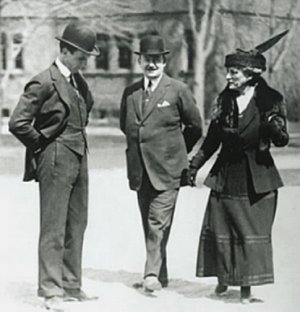
Widener (left) with his mother Eleanor Elkins Widener and architect Horace Trumbauer in Harvard Yard during the planning for Widener Library, c. 1912.

Widener was born on March 11, 1889, in Philadelphia, Pennsylvania, into the wealthy Widener family. He was the younger son of George Dunton Widener and Eleanor Elkins Widener, and brother to Harry Elkins Widener and Eleanor Widener Dixon.

His grandfathers, the streetcar magnate Peter A. B. Widener and the oil and steel financier William Lukens Elkins, were long-time friends and business partners. His father and brother both died in the sinking of the Titanic.

== Business career ==
He managed the family finances and was a director of the Electric Storage Battery Company and the Provident National Bank in Philadelphia.

== Horse racing ==
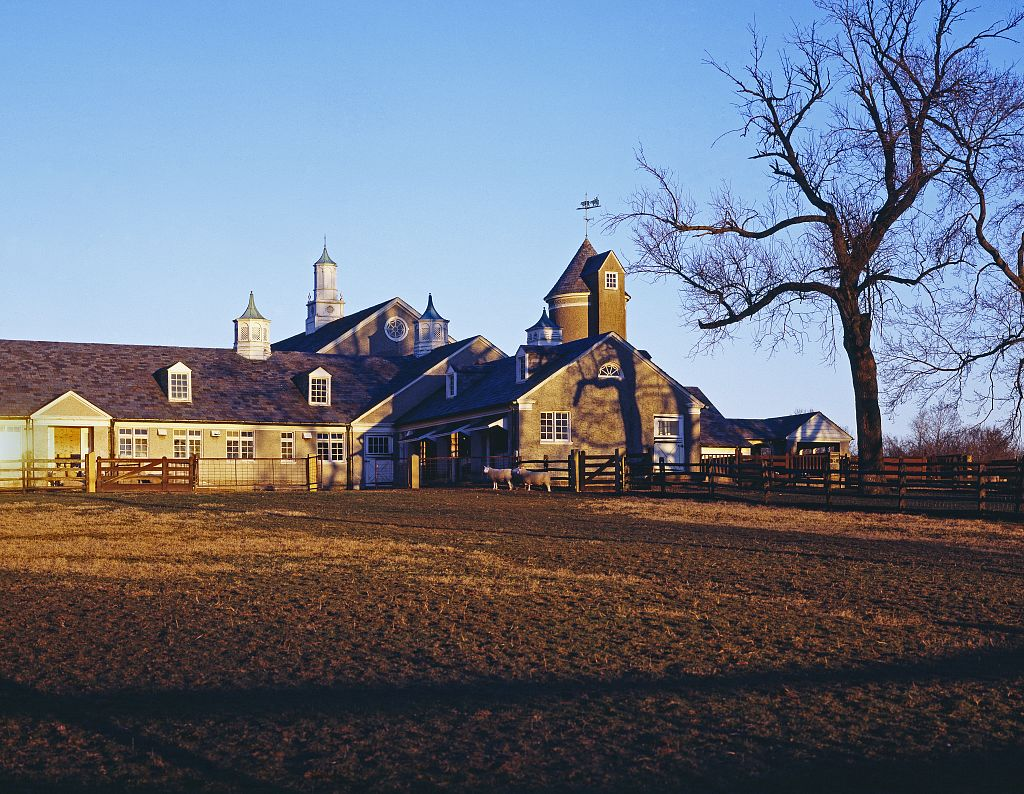
Erdenheim Farm, Widener's 446-acre estate and horse farm in Whitemarsh Township, Pennsylvania

Greatly influenced by his uncle Joseph E. Widener, he became involved in thoroughbred horse racing. In 1916, he was elected to the Jockey Club and began raising thoroughbreds at Erdenheim Farm in Whitemarsh Township, Pennsylvania. He purchased a portion of Elmendorf Farm in Lexington, Kentucky, which became known as Old Kenney Farm. He bred horses and raised 102 stakes winners including seven champions. He won the Travers Stakes five times, tying him for the record of most wins. He was the owner of Eight Thirty who was entered into the National Museum of Racing and Hall of Fame in 1994. His stakes winners included Evening Out, High Fleet, Jaipur, Jamestown, Platter, Stefanita, and What a Treat. In 1962, he sold the Old Kenney Farm.

Horses owned by Widener won 1,243 races and more than $9 million in winnings. His horses won the Flash Stakes nine times; the Futurity Stakes and Sanford Stakes five times; the Metropolitan Handicap, Hopeful Stakes, and Saratoga Special Stakes four times; the Coaching Club American Oaks two times; and the Alabama Stakes, Suburban Stakes, and Whitney Stakes one time. Horses that were bred by Widener won 4,524 races and over $16 million in winnings.

Widener served on the leadership committee for the Jockey Club from 1950 to 1963 and he led the Greater New York Association which became the New York Racing Association. From 1960 to 1968, Widener served as president of the National Museum of Racing and Hall of Fame. In 1971, he was the first to be named an "Exemplar of Racing" by the National Museum of Racing and Hall of Fame.

== Philanthropy ==
He served as chairman of the Philadelphia Museum of Art. In 1954, he built the 80-room Widener Memorial School for handicapped children which is now a part of the School District of Philadelphia.

== Personal life ==
In 1917, he married divorcée Jessie (née Sloane) Dodge, daughter of Henry T. Sloane and Jessie Robbins, and became stepfather to Diana Dodge.

He was the first Widener accepted into the Philadelphia Club.

Widener died on December 8, 1971 at Erdenheim Farm, and was interred at Laurel Hill Cemetery in Philadelphia. He left the farm and his personal fortune to his nephew, Fitz Eugene Dixon Jr.

== Legacy ==
In 1980, an addition to the New Bolton Center veterinary hospital was renamed the George D. Widener Hospital for Large Animals.
