= Irv Kosloff =

American businessman and sportsman (1912–1995)

Irving S. Kosloff (May 10, 1912, Philadelphia, Pennsylvania – February 19, 1995, Merion, Pennsylvania) was an American businessman and sportsman.

== Early life and education ==
Born in Philadelphia, Pennsylvania on May 10, 1912, Irv Kosloff was a son of Russian Jewish immigrants Lillian and Louis Kosloff. He had two brothers, Carl and Charles Kosloff.

Irv Kosloff graduated from South Philadelphia High School in 1930, where he played football and basketball as an offensive center and middle linebacker. Initially, he set out to be a dentist; however, he sustained a knee injury, and lost his athletic scholarship to Temple University, which he had attended for approximately two years. Forced to drop out and search for a job due to financial problems, he found work in the traffic department of the Container Corporation of America in Manayunk, Philadelphia.

In 1932, he founded the Roosevelt Paper Company, which was located on State Road near Cottman Avenue in Philadelphia. Over the years, the company grew into one of the nation's leading merchant/converters of printing and packaging paper.

== Career ==
In May 1963, Kosloff, with the inspiration and aid of high-school classmate attorney Ike Richman, purchased the Syracuse Nationals of the National Basketball Association (NBA) from Danny Biasone, brought them to Philadelphia, and changed the team's name to the Philadelphia 76ers. Richman ran the day-to-day operations of the team, with Kosloff, busy with his growing paper business, remaining the silent partner.

On December 4, 1965, Richman died of a heart attack at a 76ers-Boston Celtics game. Kosloff brought in Jack Ramsay to manage the team.

During Kosloff's tenure as owner, the Sixers made the playoffs nine times and won an NBA championship in 1966–67.

Kosloff sold most of his interest in the 76ers to Fitz Eugene Dixon Jr. for $8 million on May 28, 1976. He kept 10% of the team until it was sold to Harold Katz in 1980.

Kosloff, an executive who insisted on answering his own telephone and never hired a secretary, regularly attended Sixers games long after selling his stake in the team.

== Death ==
Kosloff died of leukemia at his home in Merion, Pennsylvania in 1995.
