= Miramar (mansion) =

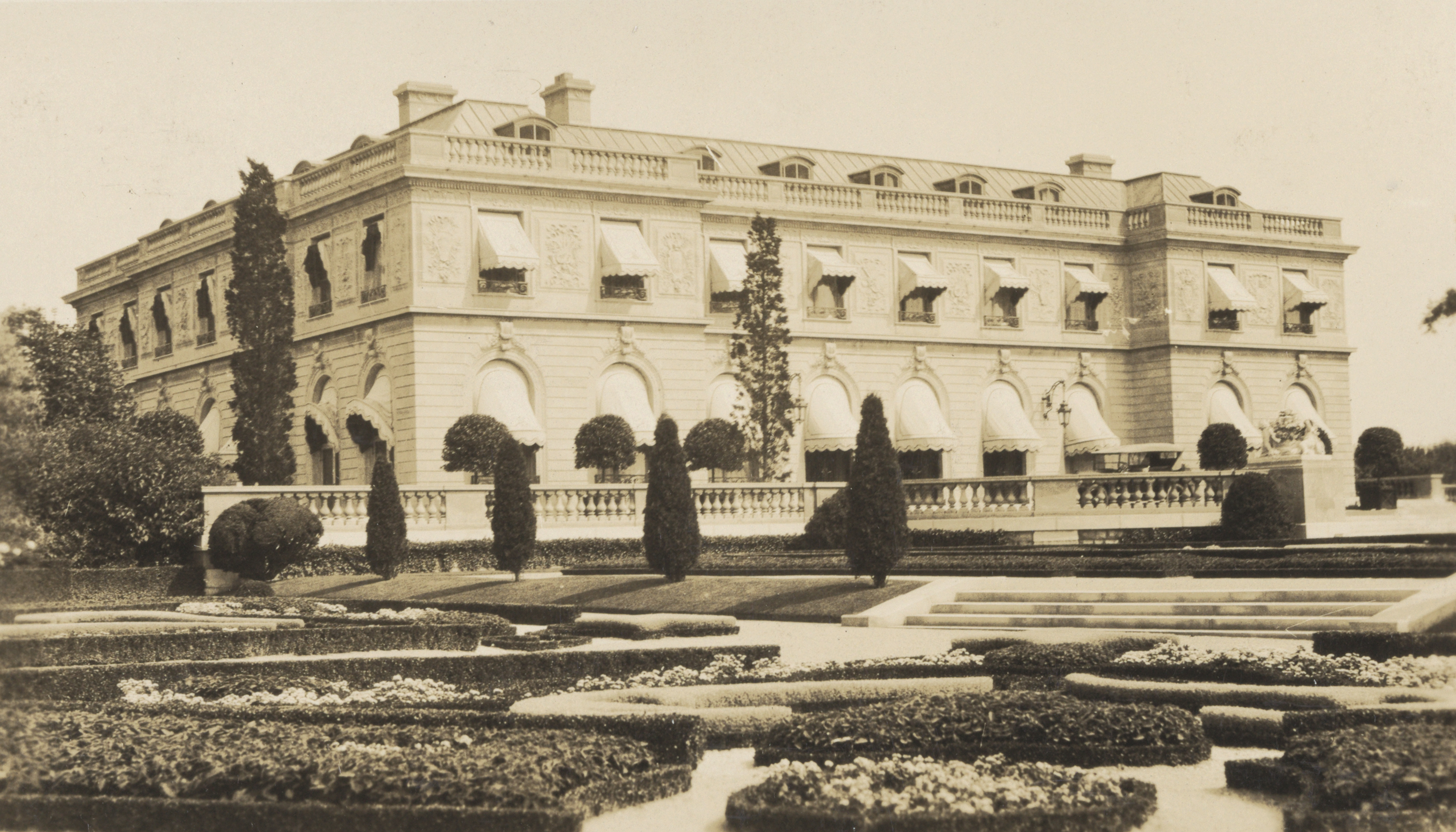
- Postcard image of the mansion

General information
- Type: Private residence
- Architectural style: French Neoclassical
- Location: Aquidneck Island, Newport, Rhode Island, US, 646 Bellevue Avenue
- Coordinates: 41°27′30″N 71°18′17″W
- Construction started: 1911
- Completed: 1915
- Inaugurated: August 20, 1915
- Client: George Dunton Widener; Eleanor Elkins Widener
- Owner: Stephen A. Schwarzman

Technical details
- Floor count: 3
- Floor area: 30,000 ft² ( 2.787 m²)

Design and construction
- Architect: Horace Trumbauer
- Other designers: Jacques Gréber (gardens)

Miramar is a 30,000-square-foot (2,800 m^{2}) French Neoclassical-style mansion on 7.8 acres (32,000 m^{2}) bordering Bellevue Avenue on Aquidneck Island in Newport, Rhode Island. Overlooking Rhode Island Sound, it was intended as a summer home for the George D. Widener family of Philadelphia.

== History ==
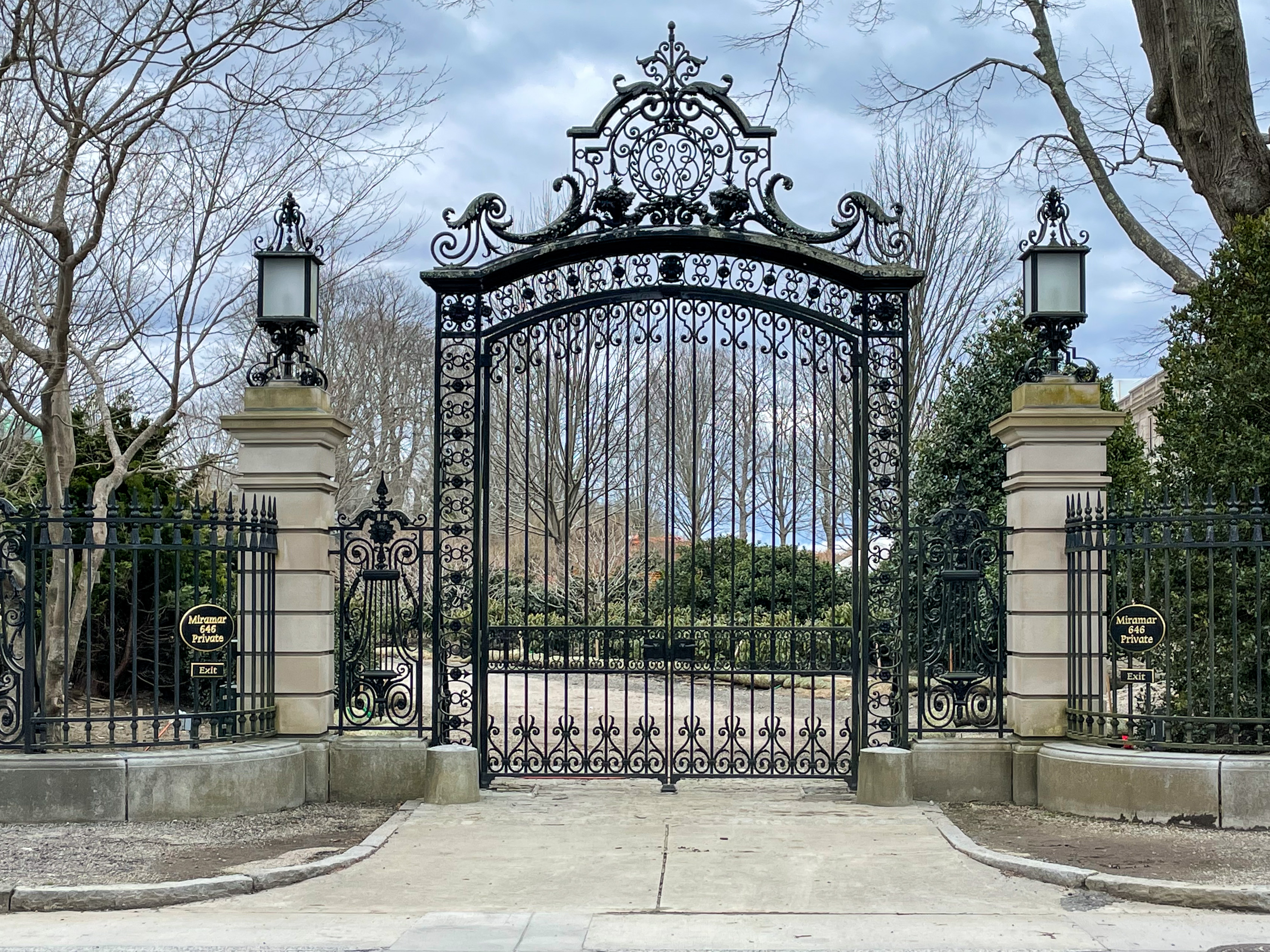
Gates on Bellevue Avenue

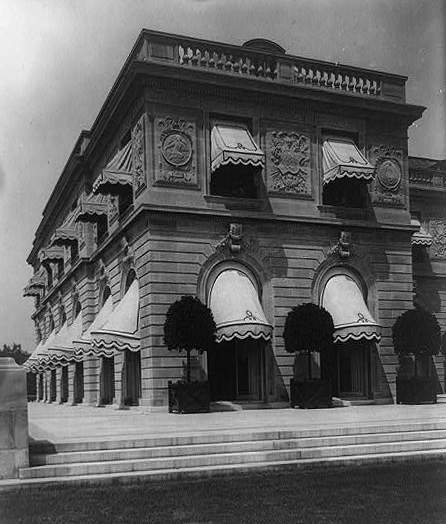
Exterior view in 1916

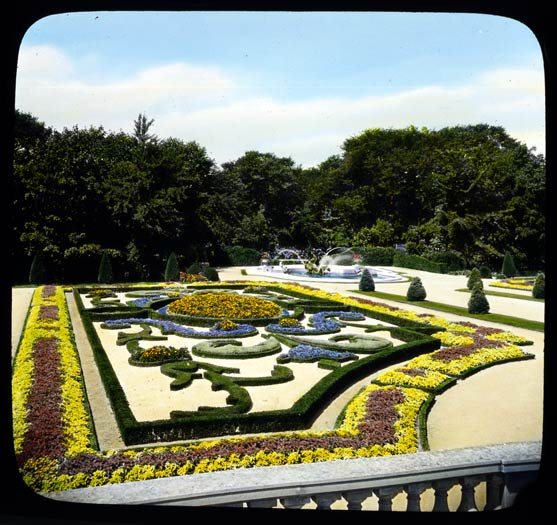
The gardens

Miramar was designed by Horace Trumbauer, who had earlier designed the nearby Edward Julius Berwind property, The Elms. The gardens were created by Jacques Gréber.

The building and landscaping were still being designed when George Widener and his son Harry died aboard the RMS Titanic. His widow, Eleanor Elkins Widener, survived the sinking; construction continued in 1913 and 1914 and Eleanor Widener hosted a large reception there on August 20, 1915.

The 27-bedroom, 14-bath mansion has a grand salon and ballroom, 27 feet by 63 feet, on the first floor, which opens onto a 4,000-square-foot (370 m^{2}) oceanfront terrace. It also features a 10,000-bottle wine cellar with a 20-ft (6 m) stone basin for icing up to 200 bottles of champagne at once.

The design of Miramar was copied from the Boullée/Lacroix east wing of the Élysée Palace in Paris. Carlhian designed the interiors; the furnishings were purchased from Joseph Duveen, 1st Baron Duveen.

The property features includes a 6,000-square-foot (560 m^{2}) carriage house and gardens with a bronze fountain designed by French sculptor Henri-Léon Gréber, father of the landscape designer.

== Owners ==
In 1956, Miramar was sold by the estate of Eleanor Widener's second husband, Alexander H. Rice Jr, for US$118,000 (equivalent to $1,400,000 in 2025), and in 2006 it sold again, for $17.5 million.

The estate was bought by Stephen A. Schwarzman in 2021 for $27 million.

As of 2025, it remains a private residence.
