= George Dunton Widener =

American businessman (1861–1912)

Coordinates: 41°43′55″N 49°56′45″W

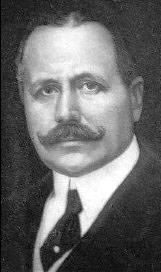
- George D. Widener
- Born: June 16, 1861; Philadelphia, Pennsylvania, U.S.
- Died: April 15, 1912 (aged 50); North Atlantic Ocean
- Resting place: North Atlantic Ocean
- Occupation: Businessman
- Spouse: Eleanor Elkins
- Children: Harry Elkins Widener; George D. Widener Jr. Eleanor Widener
- Parent(s): Peter A. B. Widener; Hannah Josephine Dunton
- Relatives: Fitz Eugene Dixon Jr. (grandson)

George Dunton Widener (June 16, 1861 – April 15, 1912) was an American businessman who died in the sinking of the RMS Titanic.

== Early life and family ==
Widener was born in Philadelphia on June 16, 1861. He was the eldest son of Hannah Josephine Dunton (1836–1896) and Peter Arrell Brown Widener (1834–1915), an extremely wealthy streetcar magnate.

Widener had a paternal uncle who was similarly named George Widener (1820–1901) and served as a member of the Philadelphia City Council.

== Career ==
Widener joined his father's business and eventually took over the running of the Philadelphia Traction Company, overseeing the development of cable and electric streetcar operations. He also served on the board of directors of several important area businesses, including Philadelphia Traction Co., Land Title Bank and Trust Co., Electric Storage Battery Co., and Portland Cement Co. A patron of the arts, he was a director of the Pennsylvania Academy of Fine Arts.

=== RMS Titanic ===
In 1912, Widener, his wife, Eleanor, and their son, Harry, traveled to Paris with original intentions to find a chef for Widener's new Philadelphia hotel, the Ritz Carlton. They booked their return passage on RMS Titanic. After the ship struck the iceberg, Widener placed Eleanor and her maid, Amalie Gieger, in a lifeboat. They were rescued by the RMS Carpathia, but Widener, Harry, and their valet, Edwin Keeping, perished. Their bodies, if recovered, were not identified.

== Personal life ==
In 1883, Widener married Eleanor Elkins, the daughter of his father's business partner, William Lukens Elkins. Together, they had two sons and a daughter:

- Harry Elkins Widener (1885–1912), who died aboard the Titanic.
- George Dunton Widener Jr. (1889–1971), who married Jessie Sloane Dodge (1883–1968) in 1917.
- Eleanor Widener (1891–1966), who married Fitz Eugene Dixon on June 19, 1912. She sued him for divorce in 1936.

After Widener and Harry's deaths aboard the Titanic, a memorial service was held at St. Paul's Episcopal Church in Elkins Park, Pennsylvania, where stained glass windows were dedicated in their memory.

=== Descendants ===
Widener was the maternal grandfather of Fitz Eugene Dixon Jr. (1923–2006). Dixon, who lived in Philadelphia, owned the Philadelphia 76ers and was a part owner of the Eagles, Phillies, and Flyers.

=== Residence ===
Widener had commissioned Horace Trumbauer to design and oversee construction of Miramar, a 30,000-square-foot (2,800 m^{2}) French neoclassical-style mansion bordering Bellevue Avenue on Aquidneck Island at Newport, Rhode Island. Intended as a summer home, it was still in the design stage at the time of his death.

== In popular culture ==
- Guy Standing Jr. (1953) - Titanic
- Péter Kõszegi (2012) - Titanic; TV series

== See also ==
- Widener Gold Medal
