= Ike Richman =

American lawyer and sports executive

- Born: Isaac Richman; July 5, 1913; Philadelphia, Pennsylvania, U.S.
- Died: December 3, 1965; Boston, Massachusetts, U.S.
- Education: Temple University
- Occupations: Attorney; Sports team owner
- Known for: Co-owner of the Philadelphia 76ers
- Spouse: Clare Richman
- Children: Michael Richman, Sybil Richman, David Richman

Isaac Richman (July 5, 1913 – December 3, 1965) was an American lawyer and sports executive. He was the personal attorney for National Basketball Association player Wilt Chamberlain and a co-owner of the Philadelphia 76ers from 1963 until his death in 1965.

== Biography ==
Richman was born in 1913 in Philadelphia. He graduated from South Philadelphia High School, where he was a classmate of Irv Kosloff, his future partner in the 76ers. He graduated from Temple University and the Temple University School of Law.

He worked as an attorney in Philadelphia and ultimately became Chamberlain's attorney, negotiating the player's first contract with the Philadelphia Warriors. In his autobiography, Chamberlain called Richman a "second father".

In 1962, Franklin Mieuli acquired a share of the team and relocated it to the San Francisco Bay Area. With no team in the Philadelphia area, Richman sought to acquire the Syracuse Nationals. He convinced Kosloff to invest the purchase price of between $500,000 and $600,000. In late 1962, the pair relocated the team to Philadelphia and renamed it the 76ers. As part of the deal, Richman became operating head of the franchise.

After receiving Chamberlain back via a trade with the Warriors, the player threatened to retire if he did not receive more money. In order to retain Chamberlain, Richman, who had a 50 percent share of the 76ers, offered Chamberlain half of his own share, which would make Chamberlain a 25 percent owner of the team upon his retirement. Because the agreement was against league rules, it was never put in writing and Chamberlain never received his share of the team. On December 3, 1965, Richman was in Boston for a game between the Celtics and the 76ers when he died from a heart attack during the game. Kosloff refused to honor Richman's agreement with the player.

== Personal life ==
Richman had two sons, Michael and David, and one daughter, Sybil. His grandson, Ike Richman, was born seven weeks after his death and worked for the 76ers for 29 years in public relations.
