= Flora V. Livingston =

American librarian and bibliographer

Flora Virginia Milner Livingston
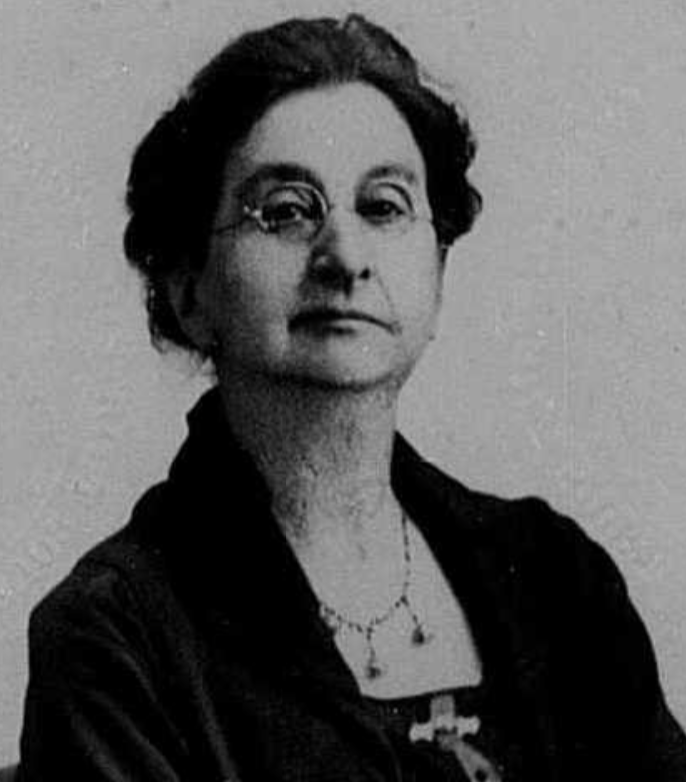
- Livingston in 1923
- Born: Flora Virginia Milner; November 25, 1862
- Died: November 23, 1949 (aged 86)
- Occupation: librarian

Flora V. Livingston (1862-1949) was an American librarian and bibliographer.

== Early life ==
Flora Virginia Milner was born in Montana in 1862. She married the horticulturalist, bibliographer, and librarian Luther S. Livingston in 1898.

== Professional career ==
Livingston's husband had been appointed first librarian of the Harry Elkins Widener Memorial Collection at Harvard University but he died in 1914 before having been able to take up the position. The following year, George Parker Winship was appointed librarian and Livingston became his assistant. In 1926 she became its curator, a position she held until 1947.

Livingston contributed to the uncovering of Thomas J. Wise's forgeries by John Carter and Graham Pollard.

Her bibliographic studies included Lewis Carroll, Robert Louis Stevenson, and Frederick Locker-Lampson. After compiling a bibliography of Rudyard Kipling, Livingston bequeathed her Kipling collection to her great-nephew Paul Montgomery, whose wife Helen Jenkins in turn bequeathed it to the University of Missouri in 2013.

== Selected publications ==
- W. F. Prideaux, A Bibliography of the Works of Robert Louis Stevenson, new edition by Flora Livingston (Hollings, 1917)
- Swinburne's Proof Sheets and American First Editions (Cosmos, 1920)
- Bibliography of the Works of Rudyard Kipling (E.H. Wells, 1927; supplement, Harvard University Press, 1938)
- The Harcourt Amory Collection of Lewis Carroll in the Harvard College Library (Harvard University Press, 1932)
- Editor, Charles Dickens's Letters to Charles Lever (Harvard University Press, 1933)

A fuller bibliography has been compiled by August A. Imholtz.
