= Alexander H. Rice (explorer) =

American geologist (1875–1956)

Alexander Hamilton Rice
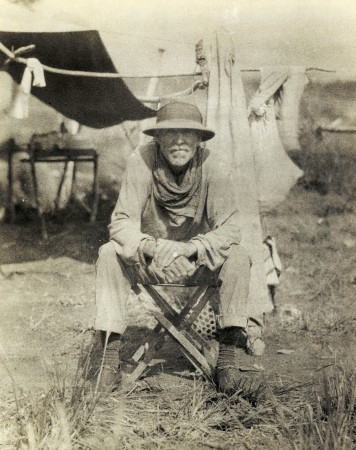
- Rice in the field
- Born: August 2, 1875; Roxbury, Massachusetts, U.S.
- Died: July 23, 1956 (aged 80); Newport, Rhode Island, U.S.
- Education: Harvard University (BA, MD)
- Known for: Aerial mapping and Amazon River exploration
- Spouse: Eleanor Elkins Widener (m. 1915; died 1937)
- Awards: Commandeur de la Légion d'honneur
- Scientific career
- Fields: Geography
- Workplaces: Harvard University

Signature
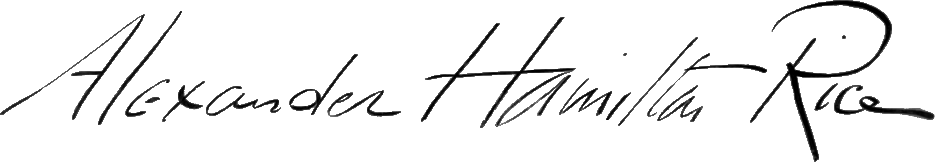

Alexander Hamilton Rice (August 29, 1875 – July 23, 1956) was an American physician, geographer, and explorer of the Amazon Basin. He was a professor of geography at Harvard University from 1929 to 1952. He was also founder and director of the Harvard Institute of Geographical Exploration and curator of the South American section of the Peabody Museum of Archaeology and Ethnology.

== Early life and military service ==
Rice was born in the Roxbury section of Boston, on August 29, 1875. His grandfather was former Boston mayor, Massachusetts governor, and U.S. Congressman Alexander Hamilton Rice.

Rice graduated from Noble and Greenough School, and then earned an A.B. from Harvard College in 1898 and an M.D. from Harvard Medical School in 1904. On October 6, 1915, he married widowed Titanic survivor Eleanor Elkins Widener.

== Career ==
=== Military and politics ===
From 1914 to 1915, he volunteered for the Paris surgical staff of the Ambulance Américain, a group of American civilian doctors serving in Europe. From 1915 to 1917, he directed the Hôpital 72, Société de Secours aux Blessés Militaires, a French charity hospital in Paris.

Once the U.S. entered World War I in 1917, he was commissioned as a lieutenant in the United States Naval Reserve, directing the 2nd Naval District Training School for Reserve Officers at Newport, Rhode Island, where he served until 1919. In 1919, he was awarded the Commandeur de la Légion d'honneur for his service to the people of France.

In 1922, Rice was the unsuccessful Republican nominee for Congress from Massachusetts's 12th congressional district.

=== Exploration and academic career ===
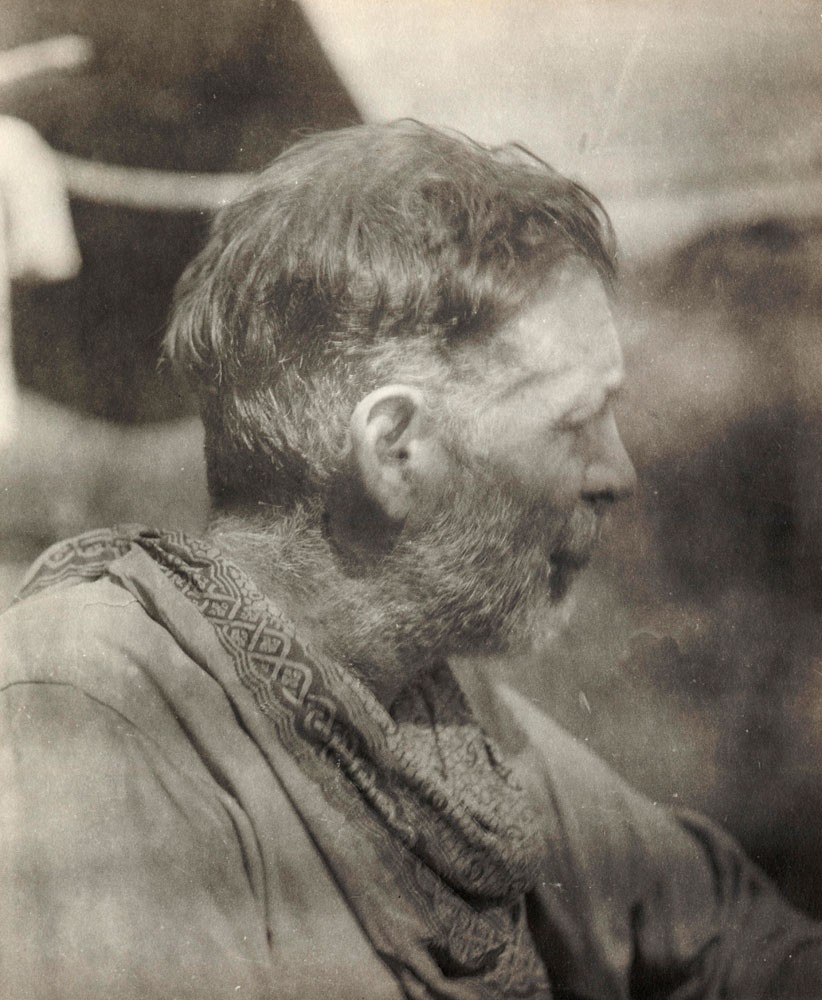
Rice on his expedition of the Amazon River in 1919 and 1920

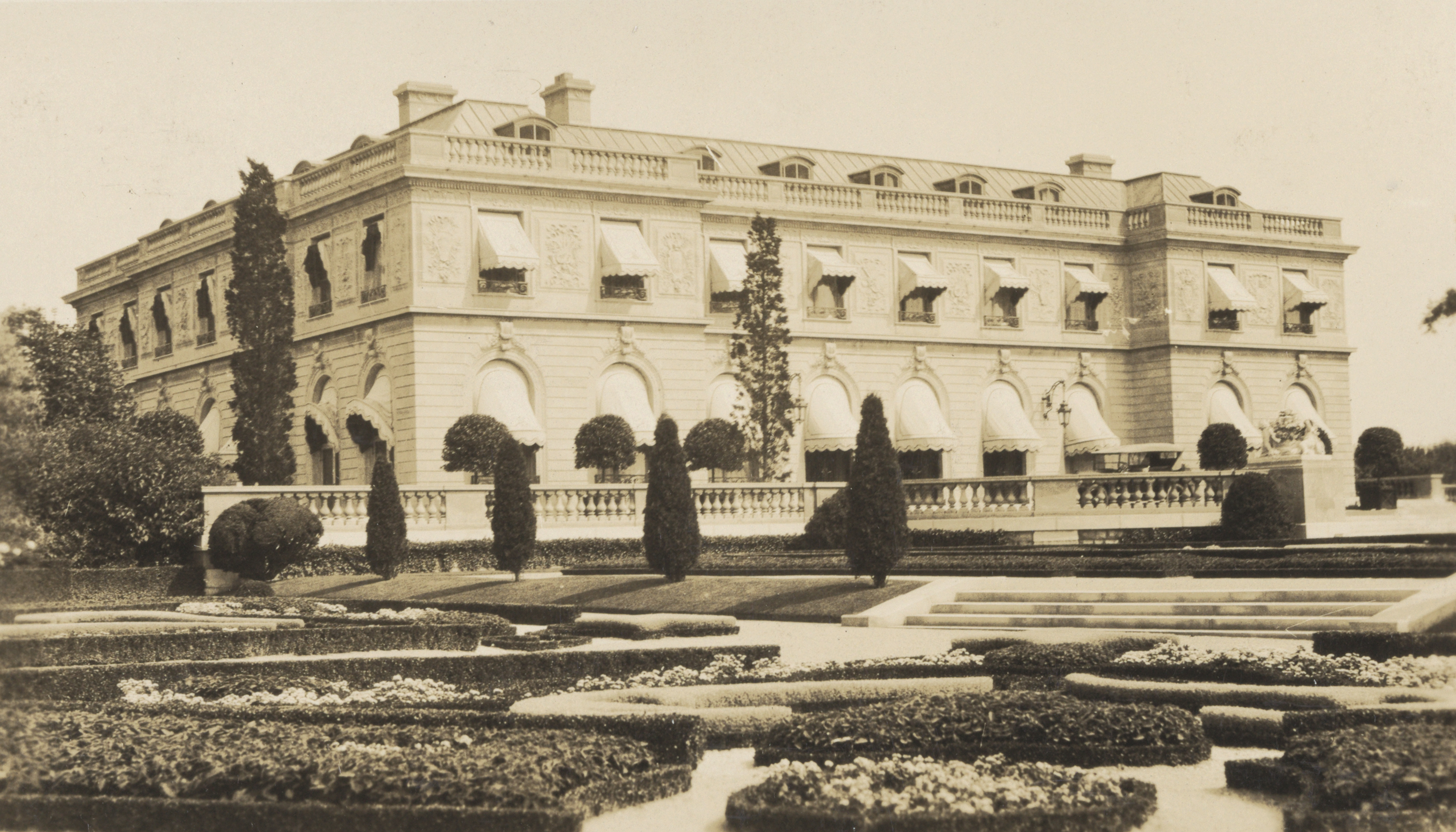
Miramar, the home Eleanor Widener Rice planned with her first husband and completed with her second

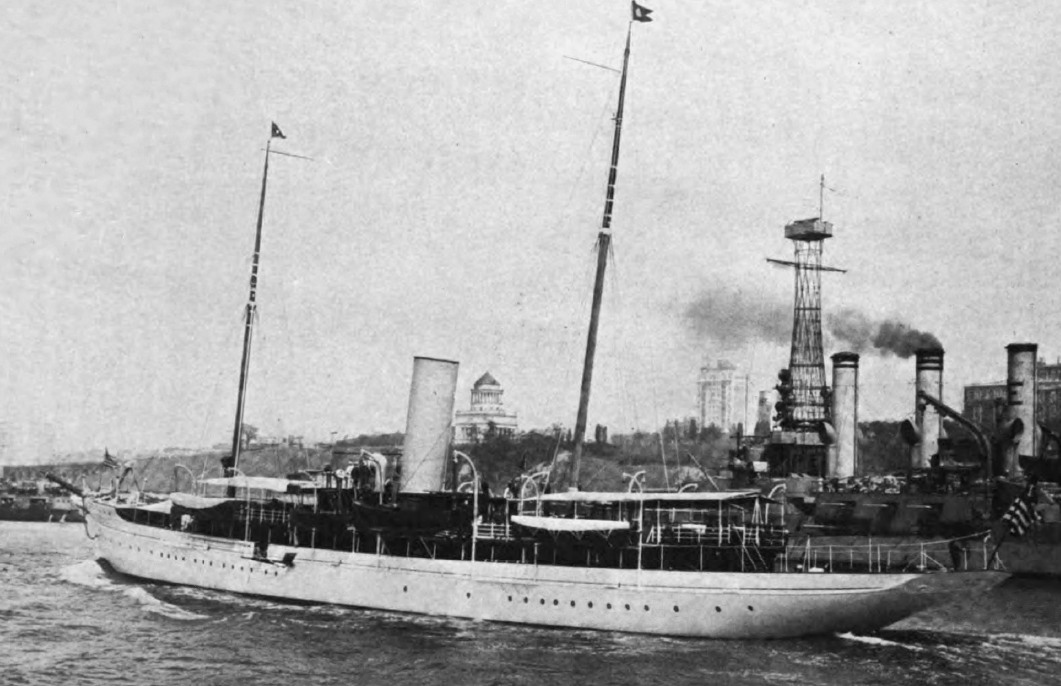
The yacht Alberta specially modified for the Rices' Amazon explorations, on the North River leaving New York on November 16, 1916

As a geographer and explorer Rice specialized in rivers. On seven expeditions, beginning in 1907, he explored 500,000 square miles (1,300,000 km^{2}) of the Amazon Basin, mapping several previously unmapped rivers in the northwestern area of the Amazon Basin reaching into Colombia and Venezuela.

After his 1915 marriage, his socialite wife accompanied him on several expeditions to South America which were chronicled in the geographic literature and followed closely by the popular press. A 1916 expedition was the subject of a 1918 book by a colleague, William Thomas Councilman. During a 1920 trip, it was reported that "the party warded off an attack by savages and killed two cannibals"‍—‌"scantily clad ... very ferocious and of large stature". A subsequent headline read: "Explorer Rice Denies That He Was Eaten By Cannibals".

On an expedition in 1919, he ascended the Orinoco to its upper reaches in Venezuela, but had a disastrous battle with a group of Yanomami, who can be belligerent but are in no sense cannibal; this was the only example throughout the twentieth century of a scientific expedition shooting and killing Amazonian indigenous people. That expedition continued, in 1920, to traverse the natural Casiquiare canal, and descend the Rio Negro to the Amazon at Manaus. His most important exploration in 1924-25 was the first to use aerial photography (from a Curtis Sea-Gull biplane with floats) and shortwave radio for mapping. This four-month expedition ascended the Rio Branco and its Uraricoera headwater (past Maraca Island and the mighty Purumame waterfall) and then, leaving its boats, cutting trails into the Parima hills. The team had a peaceful encounter with another group of Yanomami whom Rice found poor and repellent but was impressed by their magnificent conical yano hut. He also established hospitals for Indians in Brazil, researched tropical diseases, and conducted expeditions in Alaska and Hudson Bay.

He led his last expedition in 1924–1925.

Dr Rice was closely associated with the Royal Geographical Society in London. After being awarded its Patron's Medal in 1914, he lectured there frequently, and published reports of his various expeditions only in its The Geographical Journal, in 1914, 1918, 1921, and 1928.

In 1926 Rice offered to finance a railway for 850 km (500 miles) from Manaus north to Boa Vista (then Rio Branco Territory; now State of Roraima) if he was granted an operating franchise and land along it; the local governor refused.

In 1929 Rice founded Harvard's Institute of Geographical Exploration, to which he and his wife provided a considerable endowment, and which under Rice's directorship became an important center for the science of photogrammetry. His other positions included curatorship of the South American Section of the Peabody Museum of Archaeology and Ethnology; Lecturer in Diseases of Tropical South America at Harvard Medical School; and Trustee of the American Museum of Natural History.

When the Institute of Geographical Exploration closed in 1952, Rice retired.

== Awards and honors ==
His explorations of the Amazon and Orinoco Rivers won him honors which included: in 1914 Gold Medal of the Royal Geographical Society, London; Gold Medalist, Geographical Society of Philadelphia; Gold Medalist, Société Royale de Géographie d'Anvers; and gold medalist, Harvard Travelers Club.

== Personal life ==
When the Royal Geographical Society in London celebrated its centenary in 1930, he made the largest single donation (£25,000) to its appeal, which was used to build a lecture theater, library, and other rooms at its headquarters. He gave many of his films and photographs to the RGS archive.

He belonged to the Rhode Island Society of Colonial Wars, and the New Hampshire Society of the Cincinnati. He was also a member of The Explorers Club.

After retiring, Rice lived in Miramar, his wife's family mansion in Newport, Rhode Island, where he died on July 23, 1956.
