= Eleanor Widener Dixon =

American socialite and philanthropist (1891–1966)

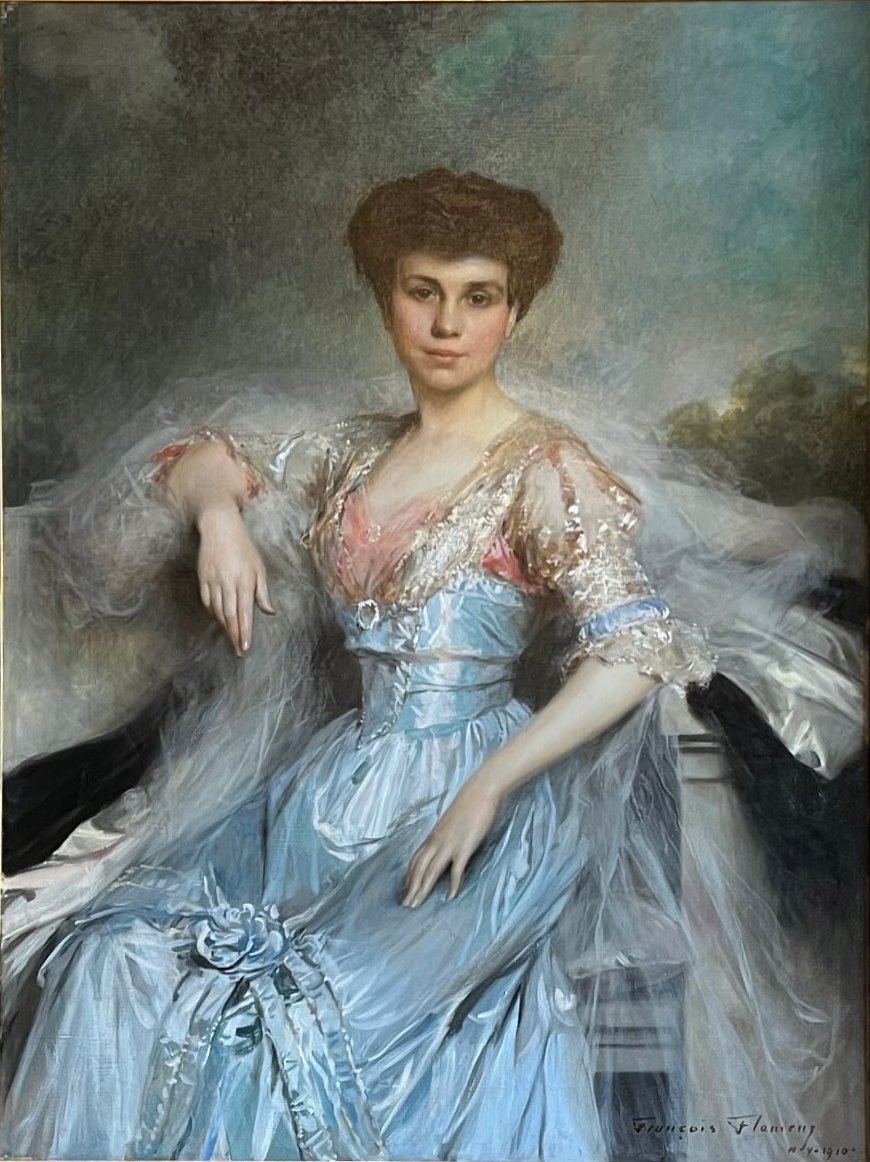
- Miss Eleanor Elkins Widener. 1910 - François Flameng. Source: The Lynnewood Hall Preservation Foundation Collection.
- Born: April 10, 1891; Philadelphia, Pennsylvania, U.S.
- Died: February 12, 1966 (aged 74)
- Resting place: Laurel Hill Cemetery, Philadelphia, Pennsylvania, U.S.

Eleanor Widener Dixon (April 10, 1891–February 12, 1966) was an American socialite and philanthropist. She was born in Philadelphia, Pennsylvania, on April 10, 1891, into the wealthy Widener family as the daughter of George Dunton Widener and Eleanor Elkins Widener.

She married Fitz Eugene Dixon Sr. in 1912. The wedding was held at Lynnewood Hall two months after her father and brother Harry Elkins Widener died in the sinking of the Titanic. Her wedding dress purchased by her parents in Paris was lost in the sinking. They lived together in a mansion on a 114-acre estate named Ronaele (her name spelled backward) which was built by Horace Trumbauer between 1923 and 1925 on the former estate of Jay Cooke. They had a daughter, also named Eleanor Widener Dixon, and a son Fitz Eugene Dixon Jr. but divorced in 1936.

In 1942, she donated her $350,000 yacht, also named Ronaele, to the United States Navy for service during World War II as the USS Alabaster.

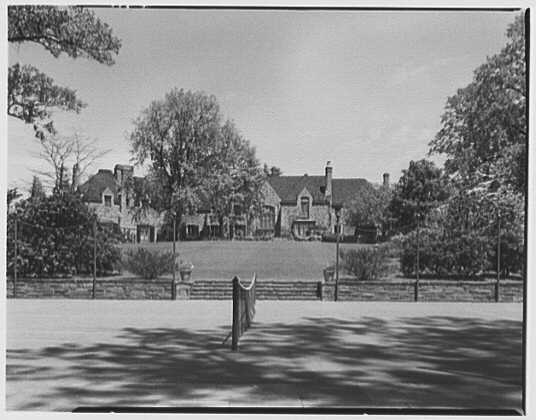
Eleanor Widener Dixon's "Homewood" mansion in the Chestnut Hill neighborhood of Philadelphia

In 1949, she purchased "Homewood", a mansion in the Chestnut Hill neighborhood of Philadelphia and again hired Horace Trumbauer to update the residence. In 1969, her son donated the home to Temple University for use as a lodge for attendees of the Albert M. Greenfield Conference Center.

In 1956, she sold the Ronaele estate to the De La Salle Brothers which used it as student housing for La Salle College. In 1973, the estate was sold to developers and demolished in 1974. Several of the interior art features were donated to the La Salle University Art Museum.

She donated money to support Abington Memorial Hospital. She spent her summers in Winter Harbor, Maine, and in August 1961, Widener donated $50,000 to build the Eleanor Widener Dixon Memorial Clinic in Gouldsboro, Maine. The clinic closed in 2024.

She died on February 12, 1966, and was interred at Laurel Hill Cemetery in Philadelphia.
