= Harold Katz =

American businessman (1937–2025)

Harold Katz (May 5, 1937 – January 25, 2025) was an American businessman. He was from the Greater Philadelphia area. He attended Sharon Senior High School and received an alumni hall of fame award in 2024.

== Life and career ==
Katz bought the Philadelphia 76ers of the National Basketball Association from Fitz Eugene Dixon Jr. in July 1981. During his ownership, he brought the 76ers to their most recent NBA Championship win in the 1982–1983 season. He sold the team to Comcast Spectacor in April 1996. Katz was also the founder and former owner of Nutrisystem, Inc. and founder of the private equity firm H. Katz Capital Group.

Katz died on January 25, 2025, at the age of 87.

Sporting positions
Preceded by Fitz Eugene Dixon Jr.	Philadelphia 76ers owner 1982–1996	Succeeded by Ed Snider
