= Titanic (2012 TV series) =

2012 British television drama series

- Genre: Period drama
- Created by: Nigel Stafford-Clark
- Written by: Julian Fellowes
- Directed by: Jon Jones
- Starring: See prose
- Composer: Jonathan Goldsmith
- Countries of origin: international co-production of: Hungary; United Kingdom; Canada
- Original language: English
- No. of series: 1
- No. of episodes: 4

Production
- Executive producers: Kate Bartlett (ITV Studios); Simon Vaughan (Lookout Point); Jennifer Kawaja and Julia Sereny (Sienna Films); Howard Ellis and Adam Goodman (Mid Atlantic Films)
- Producers: Nigel Stafford-Clark; Chris Thompson
- Cinematography: Adam Suschitzky
- Running time: Episodes vary (43 to 46 minutes) Full running time (184 minutes)
- Production companies: Deep Indigo; Sienna Films; Mid Atlantic Films; ITV Studios; Lookout Point
- Budget: $18 million (Note: $4.5 million per episode.)

Original release
- Network: ITV
- Release: 25 March – 15 April 2012
- Network: ABC
- Release: 14 April – 15 April 2012

Titanic is a four-part television serial and period drama written by Julian Fellowes. It is based on the passenger liner RMS Titanic, which sank in the North Atlantic Ocean in April 1912 following a collision with an iceberg on her maiden voyage from Southampton to New York City.

The series was created by producer Nigel Stafford-Clark and written by Julian Fellowes to mark the 100th anniversary of the maritime disaster on 15 April 1912. It sets out to paint a portrait of a whole society, telling the stories of a wide range of characters, both real and imagined, from every social level. Their narratives are developed and gradually interwoven over the first three episodes, each of which ends in a cliffhanger as the ship begins to founder. The fourth and final episode draws all of the different stories together and reveals to the audience who survives.

Titanic was released in March and April 2012 for the disaster's centenary on 15 April 2012. It was one of two such productions to mark the anniversary; the other was Titanic: Blood and Steel.

== Plot ==
=== Episode 1 ===
The Earl of Manton, his wife, his manservant, and the Lady Manton's maid have been booked on the Titanic for ages; the earl arranges for his daughter, Georgiana, who has been rebelling against society by advocating for women's suffrage, to get a booking at the last minute. They board the ship, and Lady Manton is instantly inhospitable to Muriel Batley, wife of the earl's employee, John Batley. A further rift is caused between the pair when Lady Manton tells Mrs Batley about her blood roots back to Ireland, which Mrs Batley mocks. The ship hits an iceberg. Although Georgiana is put on a boat, Lady Manton refuses to leave her husband.

=== Episode 2 ===
The designers of Titanic are in conflict over how many lifeboats should be on the ship. Thomas Andrews hires Irishman Jim Maloney to get a more competent team to finish the behind-schedule electrical wiring, in exchange for transporting his family to America for a new life. Although his wife, Mary, is unsure of the move, they go anyway and Jim manages to secure the family a room in third class. However, a stranger and fellow passenger, Peter, makes Mary wary by constantly appearing nearby and soon makes the acquaintance of Mary's husband. Meanwhile, Paolo, the brother of the Italian engineer Mario, catches the eye of a beautiful stewardess, Annie Desmond. John and Muriel Batley are shown having a turbulent time in their marriage. The ship hits the iceberg, and the Maloney family is trapped below decks. Peter steps out by attacking one of the stewards so Mary and her children can pass; however, both he and Jim are trapped below decks. Mary and her children manage to get on board a lifeboat, but the Batleys are unable to board a lifeboat and they, the Earl of Manton, and Barnes attempt to right an overturned lifeboat as the water reaches the boat deck.

=== Episode 3 ===
Italian stoker Mario Sandrini gets a job on the ship, and he also manages to secure passage for his brother Paolo, as the only foreign waiter in the first class dining saloon. Paolo instantly becomes smitten with cabin steward Annie Desmond. Watson brings Lady Manton's jewel case down to steerage, and Barnes is shocked to discover why. Meanwhile, Paolo startles Annie with an impulsive gesture. Mary finally lets her guard down with Peter, enraging her husband Jim. However, their argument is interrupted when the iceberg strikes, and fear builds in steerage as passengers find themselves behind locked gates. Peter helps Mary and her children escape, and after Mario is dragged away by the two seamen, passengers from steerage manage to get up on deck, Jim and Peter in their midst. When up on deck the Earl of Manton helps Mary and the children into a lifeboat but, in the scramble for safety, Mary's terrified daughter Theresa bolts back inside the sinking ship, followed by her father. Mario and the other Italians from Gatti's Restaurant have been locked in a storage cupboard and, after Paolo sees Annie safely to a lifeboat, he goes in search of his brother. Paolo struggles to open the locked cupboard as the water quickly rises around him.

=== Episode 4 ===
The passengers are in a desperate plight as the Titanic sinks into the icy waters. Watson is accidentally locked in the Mantons' cabin searching for her father's book when a steward orders that all first class cabins be locked to prevent people from stealing. However, she is saved when Barnes comes to her aid and gets a steward to open the door. When she is running for a lifeboat, he gives her an envelope and tells her not to open it until she is safe. Peter and Jim go in search of Theresa, Jim's daughter, but when Jim finds her, it is too late to escape. Theresa asks him what they do now, and he replies that they sit there and hold each other tightly. Paolo manages to get Peter to help him free his brother and the other Italians from the cupboard. Lady Manton is finally persuaded to get into a lifeboat. As Batley and his wife try to launch the overturned lifeboat with Lord Manton, Barnes and other passengers and crew, the ship takes its final plunge and waters engulfs the forward superstructure, sweeping them all apart. Barnes drowns. Paolo and Mario jump into the water and are separated; Mario climbs onto an overturned lifeboat, and sees the ship break in half and sink beneath the waves. Batley floats by, clinging to his wife's body. He is persuaded to let her go and is pulled aboard. Only three people are saved; these include Paolo, who died just as he was found, and Lord Manton, who survives. Watson reads the letter Barnes wrote her. It is his will, in which he leaves her a small house, which should be perfect for her father. The series ends with the survivors being approached by the rescue ship, RMS Carpathia.

== Cast ==
Titanic has over 89 main characters. They are listed in alphabetical order by actor's last name, under the first episode in which each actor appeared.

=== Episode 1 ===
Actor	Role
Thomas Aldridge	Steward Taylor
Sally Bankes	Mrs. Gibson
Ben Bishop	Stoker Lyons
Glen Blackhall	Paolo Sandrini
Ruth Bradley	Mary Maloney
Dragoș Bucur	Peter the Painter (Peter Lubov)
David Calder	Captain Edward Smith
Stephen Campbell Moore	Thomas Andrews
Jenna-Louise Coleman	Annie Desmond
Pandora Colin	Countess of Rothes
Olivia Darnley	Bessie Allison
Joséphine de La Baume	Léontine Aubart
Tim Downie	Policeman
David Eisner	Benjamin Guggenheim
Laurie Hagen	Emma Sägesser
Ryan Hawley	Jack Thayer
Celia Imrie	Grace Rushton
Toby Jones	John Batley
Linda Kash	Margaret "Molly" Brown
Christine Kavanagh	Marian Thayer
Will Keen	Chief Officer Wilde
Maria Doyle Kennedy	Muriel Batley
Diana Kent	Eleanor Widener
Antonio Magro	Mario Sandrini
Lyndsey Marshal	Mabel Watson
Joseph May	Victor Giglio
Brian McCardie	First Officer Murdoch
Georgia McCutcheon	Theresa Maloney
Peter McDonald	Jim Maloney
Noah Reid	Harry Elkins Widener
Miles Richardson	John Jacob Astor IV
Linus Roache	Hugh, Earl of Manton
Lee Ross	Kenneth Barnes
Sophie Rundle	Roberta Maioni
Geraldine Somerville	Louisa, Countess of Manton
Izabella Urbanowicz	Alice Cleaver
Steven Waddington	Second Officer Lightoller
Perdita Weeks	Lady Georgiana Grex
Peter Wight	Joseph Rushton
James Wilby	J. Bruce Ismay
Sophie Winkleman	Dorothy Gibson
Csongor Veér	Band Leader
Mátyás Ölveti	Cellist
Péter Mező	Violinist

=== Episode 2 ===
Actor	Role
Simon Paisley Day	Sir Cosmo Duff-Gordon
Ralph Ineson	Steward Hart
Mark Lewis Jones	David Evans
Grainne Keenan	Laura Francatelli
Sylvestra Le Touzel	Lady Duff-Gordon
Timothy West	Lord Pirrie
Michele Moran	Prostitute

=== Episode 3 ===
Actor	Role
Colm Gormley	Winston Churchill
Jonathan Howard	Sixth Officer James Moody
John Kazek	Steward Turnbull

=== Episode 4 ===
Actor	Role
Tom Andrews	Seaman Hawkins
Ross Armstrong	Seaman Penton
Shane Attwooll	Billy Blake
Cian Barry	Fourth Officer Boxhall
Paul Bridle	Crewman Strickland
Lloyd Hutchinson	Chief Steward Latimer
Dave Legeno	Seaman Davis
Iain McKee	Seaman Scott
Ifan Meredith	Fifth Officer Lowe

== Production ==
Filming began in May 2011. A two-tier set was constructed for the series at Stern Studios in Budapest, Hungary. This contained a representation of 60 metres (200 feet) of the ship's promenade deck and 50 metres (160 feet) of the boat deck. Other sets featured 75 metres (246 feet) of internal corridors and rooms such as the ship's bridge, pursers' offices, staterooms for the different classes, dining rooms and boiler rooms.

The production also involved the construction of the largest indoor water tank in Europe. The 900-square-metre (9,700-square-foot) tank contained an immersible section representing part of the ship's interior and decks.

The promos were shot at Pinewood Studios. The drama's soundtrack was composed by Jonathan Goldsmith.

== Release ==
Titanic aired on ITV1 in the United Kingdom from 25 March - 15 April 2012, the final episode airing on the 100th anniversary of the ship's sinking. In the United States, the first three episodes aired together on ABC on 14 April 2012, with the final episode airing on 15 April 2012. In Canada, the series aired on Global TV from 21 March - 11 April 2012.

== Reception ==
On review aggregator Rotten Tomatoes, the series has an aggregated score of 38% based one eight critic reviews, with an average rating of 6.8/10.

John Doyle of The Globe and Mail described Titanic as "exemplary entertainment", "a high-grade nobs-and-slobs story set on a sinking ship". He found the use of flashbacks and changing perspective to be an effective yet simple "approach to a story that everyone feels they know". Alex Strachan of Montreal's The Gazette considered the drama "a mixed success" as the "upstairs-downstairs class struggle is old fodder for U.K. costume dramas" but it is "not as emotionally gripping" as James Cameron's film nor as informative as the many documentaries that exist. What makes it worth seeing is the "decision to tell his story using flashbacks and fast-forwards. Each hour-long instalment begins and ends at a different point in the ship's voyage, and the pace never flags." Brad Oswald of the Winnipeg Free Press said that the miniseries lives up to the story it endeavours to tell, that it is a disaster. With such emphasis on class distinction "it completely misses the mark in terms of portraying the emotional and organizational chaos of the tragedy". He went on to say that, in comparison to the many programmes on so many channels and the James Cameron film, "this tepid offering feels rather redundant and pointless".

== Ratings ==
United Kingdom viewing figures are provided by the Broadcasters' Audience Research Board.

Episode No.	Airdate	Total viewers (millions)
1	25 March 2012	9.07
2	1 April 2012	6.19
3	8 April 2012	5.85
4	15 April 2012	7.73

United States viewing figures are provided by Nielsen.

Episode No.	Airdate	Total viewers (millions)
1–3	14 April 2012	4.17
4	15 April 2012	4.11
