= Fitz Eugene Dixon Jr. =

American philanthropist, owner of the Philadelphia 76ers

- Born: August 14, 1923; Winter Harbor, Maine; United States
- Died: August 2, 2006 (aged 82); Abington, Pennsylvania, United States
- Resting place: St. Thomas' Church, Whitemarsh
- Education: Episcopal Academy
- Alma mater: Harvard University
- Occupations: Educator, sportsman, philanthropist
- Spouse: Edith B. Robb (m. 1952)
- Children: Edith Eleanor Dixon; George Widener Dixon
- Parent(s): Fitz Eugene Dixon Sr. Eleanor Widener Dixon
- Relatives: George Dunton Widener (grandfather)

Fitz Eugene Dixon Jr. (August 14, 1923 – August 2, 2006) was an American educator, sportsman, and philanthropist.

== Early life ==
He was the son of banker Fitz Eugene Dixon Sr. and Eleanor Widener Dixon (1891–1966), a member of the wealthy Widener family from Philadelphia. The Dixons built Ronaele Manor ("Eleanor" spelled backward), an Elizabethan mansion, in Elkins Park, Pennsylvania, where Fitz Jr. grew up.

Fitz Jr. graduated from Philadelphia's Episcopal Academy, then Harvard University, after which he returned to Episcopal to teach English, French, and Health; he also coached the school's squash, tennis, and 120-pound football teams and served as director of athletics and assistant to the headmaster.

== Career ==
In 1971, on the death of his mother's childless surviving brother George Dunton Widener Jr., Fitz Jr. inherited his uncle's entire estate, including the 500-acre (2.0 km^{2}) Erdenheim Farm in Whitemarsh Township, Pennsylvania, and took over the running of the Widener Foundation. The Widener fortune, amassed in the meat-packing and streetcar businesses, saw Fitz Eugene Dixon Jr. listed in Forbes Magazine's 400 Richest Americans in 1985, 1991, and 1995.

Dixon bred thoroughbred racehorses at Erdenheim Farm, and was a member and one-time Chairman of the Pennsylvania Horse Racing Commission. Dixon was also a patron of equestrian show jumping, having owned such horses as Jet Run and Rhum IV, who competed and medaled in domestic, Pan American, World Cup, and Olympic events.

=== Professional sports ===
Dixon became an owner of and investor in Philadelphia professional sports franchises, including the Eagles, the Phillies, the Flyers, and the Wings, but his most notable sports investment was the Philadelphia 76ers. He served as vice chairman for the Flyers when they won the Stanley Cup in 1974 and 1975. He purchased the Philadelphia 76ers from Irv Kosloff for $8 million on May 28, 1976, and a few months later brought Julius "Dr. J." Erving to the team for $6.6 million. In his brief stint as owner, the team made it to the NBA finals twice but never won a championship. He sold the team to Harold Katz in 1981.

=== Philanthropy ===
One of his best-known civic accomplishments was the 1976 purchase of the iconic Love sculpture that now stands at the head of John F. Kennedy Plaza in Center City Philadelphia. Dixon purchased the statue from the Robert Indiana studio after the artist had removed it from the city when it failed to come up with the $45,000 he had sought for its purchase. Dixon bought the sculpture for $35,000 and donated it to the city. The plaza has since come to be known popularly as LOVE Park.

He served on the boards of the Fairmount Park Commission, the Philadelphia Art Commission, and the Delaware River Port Authority, and was at times chairman of all three.

He also served on the boards of several universities, including as chairman at Widener University, Lafayette College, Philadelphia College of Art, and Temple University. The Dixon Halls, North and South, at Widener University were enabled by his gift to establish an alternative apartment living experience for upper-class students. Temple University's Dixon Hall, built in 1983 on the university's Ambler campus, is named in his honor. Dixon Hall, a residence hall at Kutztown University of Pennsylvania, is also named after him. He was also selected in 1982 as the founding chairman of the board of governors of the State System of Higher Education, which was founded to bring together several former teachers' colleges and Indiana University of Pennsylvania. In 1993, the system's headquarters, the Dixon University Center, was named in his honor. The Dixon Trophy, awarded each season by the Pennsylvania State Athletic Conference to the league's most successful program, is also named for him.

== Personal life ==
In 1952, he married Edith Bruen Robb, the daughter of David B. Robb. Together, they had two children.

Dixon died of melanoma on August 2, 2006, in Abington, Pennsylvania, near Philadelphia, where he was interred at Saint Thomas' Church Cemetery in Whitemarsh.
