= Harry Elkins Widener =

American businessman and bibliophile (1885–1912)

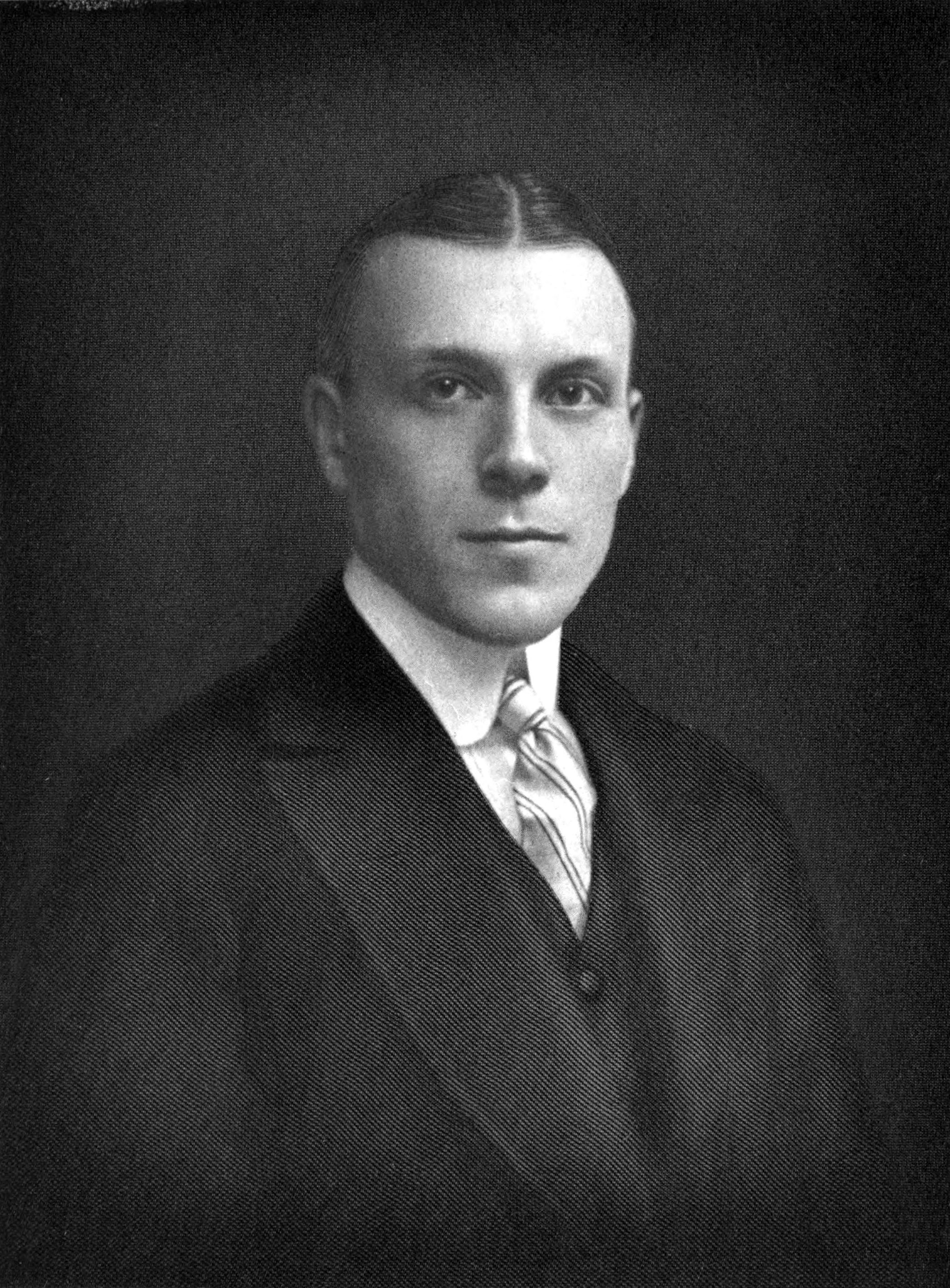
- A 1913 painting of Harry Elkins Widener by Gabriel Ferrier
- Born: January 3, 1885; Philadelphia, Pennsylvania, U.S.
- Died: April 15, 1912 (aged 27); Atlantic Ocean
- Education: Harvard University (A.B., 1907)
- Occupations: Businessman, book collector
- Known for: Namesake of Harry Elkins Widener Memorial Library

Signature
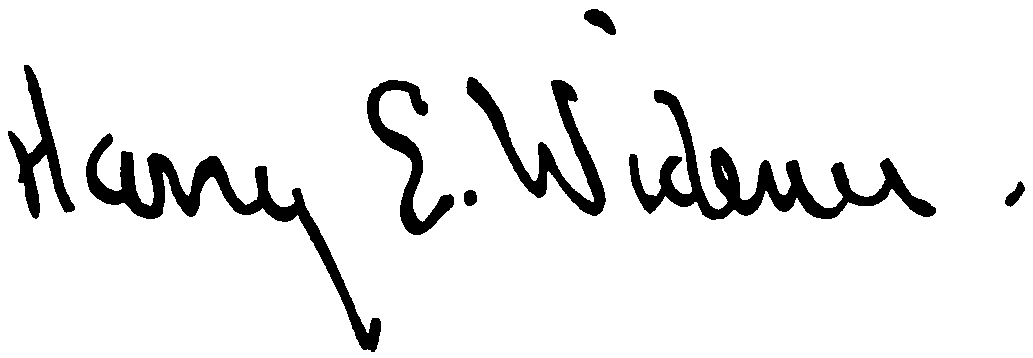

Harry Elkins Widener (January 3, 1885 – April 15, 1912) was an American businessman and bibliophile, and a member of the Widener family. His mother built Harvard University's Widener Memorial Library in his memory, after his death on the foundering of the RMS Titanic.

== Early life and education ==
Widener's 1908 bookplate

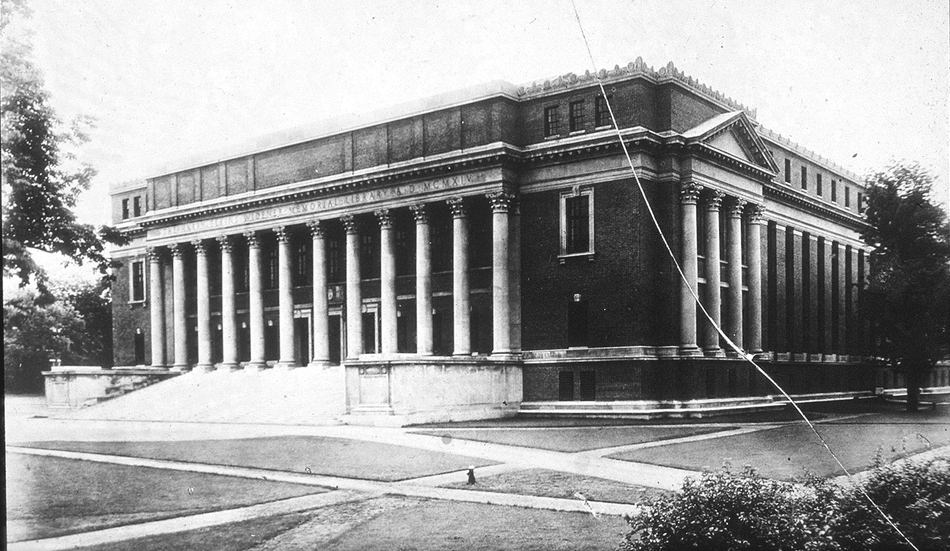
Widener Library at Harvard University, named in his honor

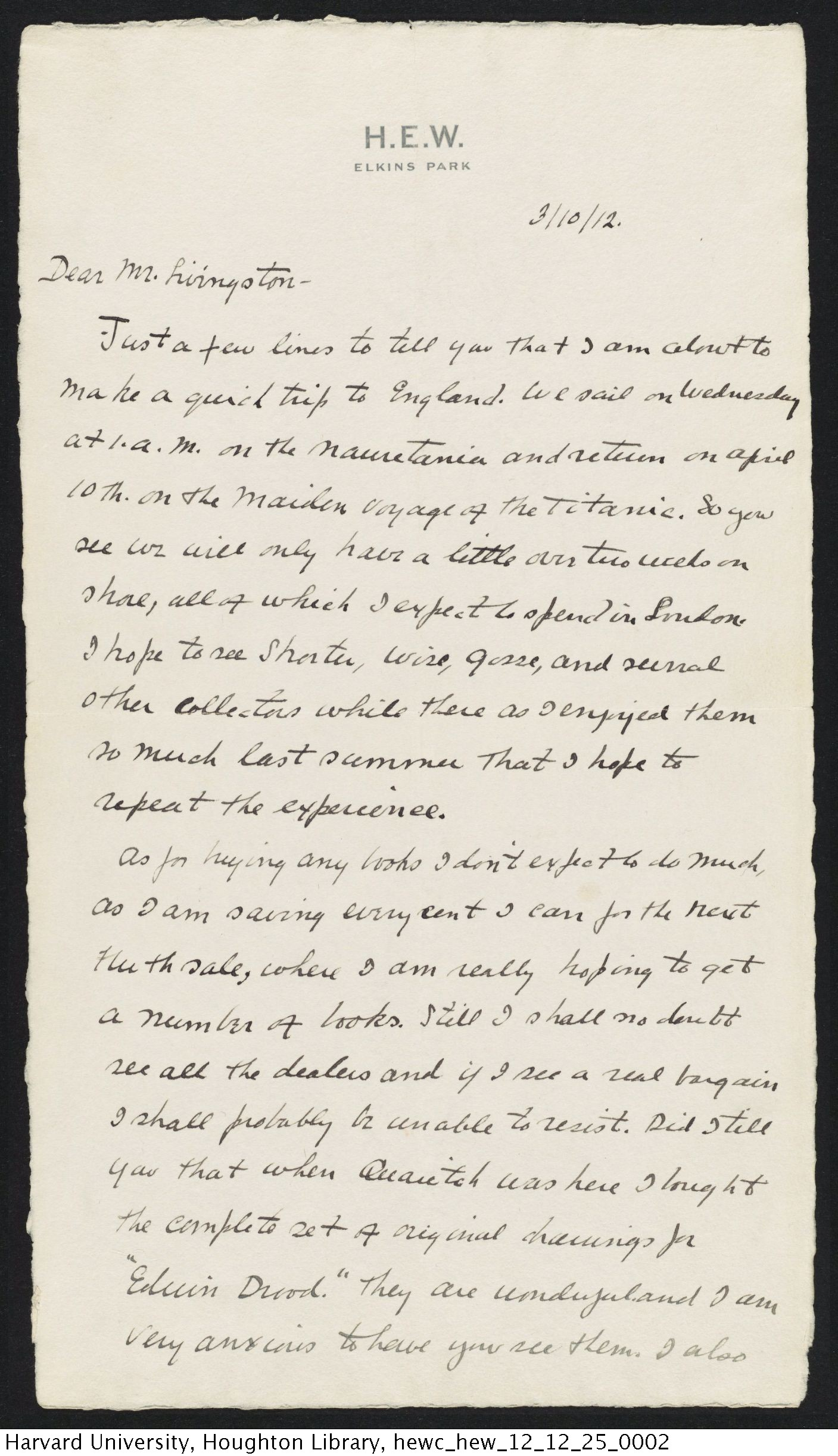
Letter to his friend, Luther S. Livingston: "We ... return on April 10th on the maiden voyage of the Titanic ..."

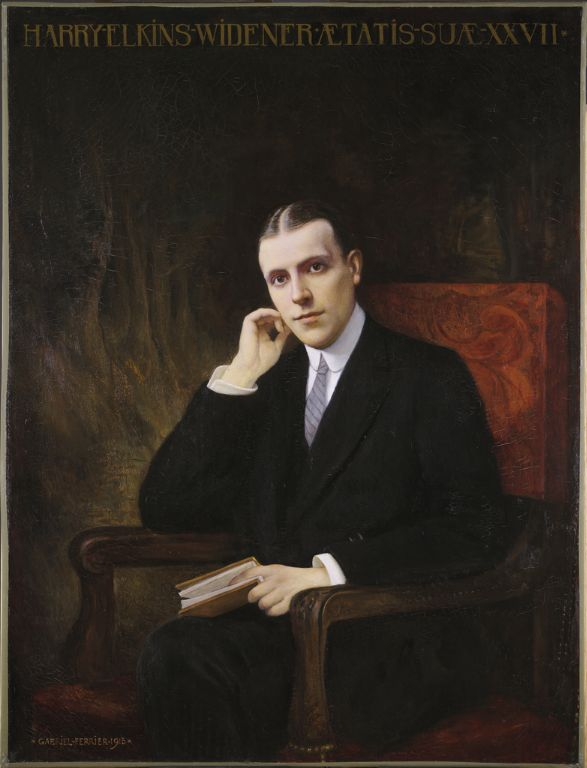
Posthumous portrait of Widener by Gabriel Ferrier in 1913

Widener was born in Philadelphia, Pennsylvania, the son of George Dunton Widener (1861–1912) and Eleanor Elkins Widener, and the grandson of Philadelphia businessmen Peter A. B. Widener (1834–1915) and William L. Elkins (1832–1903). He attended The Hill School in Pottstown, Pennsylvania, and graduated from Harvard College in 1907, where he was a member of Hasty Pudding Theatricals and the Owl Club. Widener's godfather was the British banking magnate, Charles Mills, the 2nd Baron Hillingdon.

== Book collecting ==
Widener was a member of the Grolier Club.

Book collector and dealer George Sidney Hellman, following Widener's death, said,

the excellence of his technical knowledge ... His enthusiasm as a collector and his winning personality ... afforded many opportunities of obtaining treasures whose acquisition cannot be explained alone on the basis of the wealth which he commanded. Had he not perished in the Titanic catastrophe, beyond question ... his library would surely have eventually become one of the greatest collections of books in modern times. [He] was not satisfied alone in having a rare book or a rare book inscribed by the author; it was with him a prerequisite that the volume should be in immaculate condition.

== Titanic sinking ==
Along with his parents, in April 1912 Widener boarded the Titanic at Cherbourg, France bound for New York City. As the ship sank Widener's mother and her maid were rescued, but Widener, his father, and his father's valet perished. In 1915, Widener's mother donated the Harry Elkins Widener Memorial Library to Harvard in his memory. Two buildings at the Hill School are also dedicated to Widener, and stained glass windows at St. Paul's Episcopal Church, Elkins Park, Pennsylvania, are dedicated to Widener and his father.

A Harvard legend holds that in order to spare others her son's fate, Widener's mother insisted, as a condition of her gift, that future Harvard graduates be required to learn to swim. However, while Harvard implemented a swimming test in the 1920s, which it later dropped, the policy was unrelated to Widener.

== Portrayals ==
- Noah Reid (2012) Titanic; TV series
