= Luther S. Livingston =

American bibliophile and erudite (1864–1914)

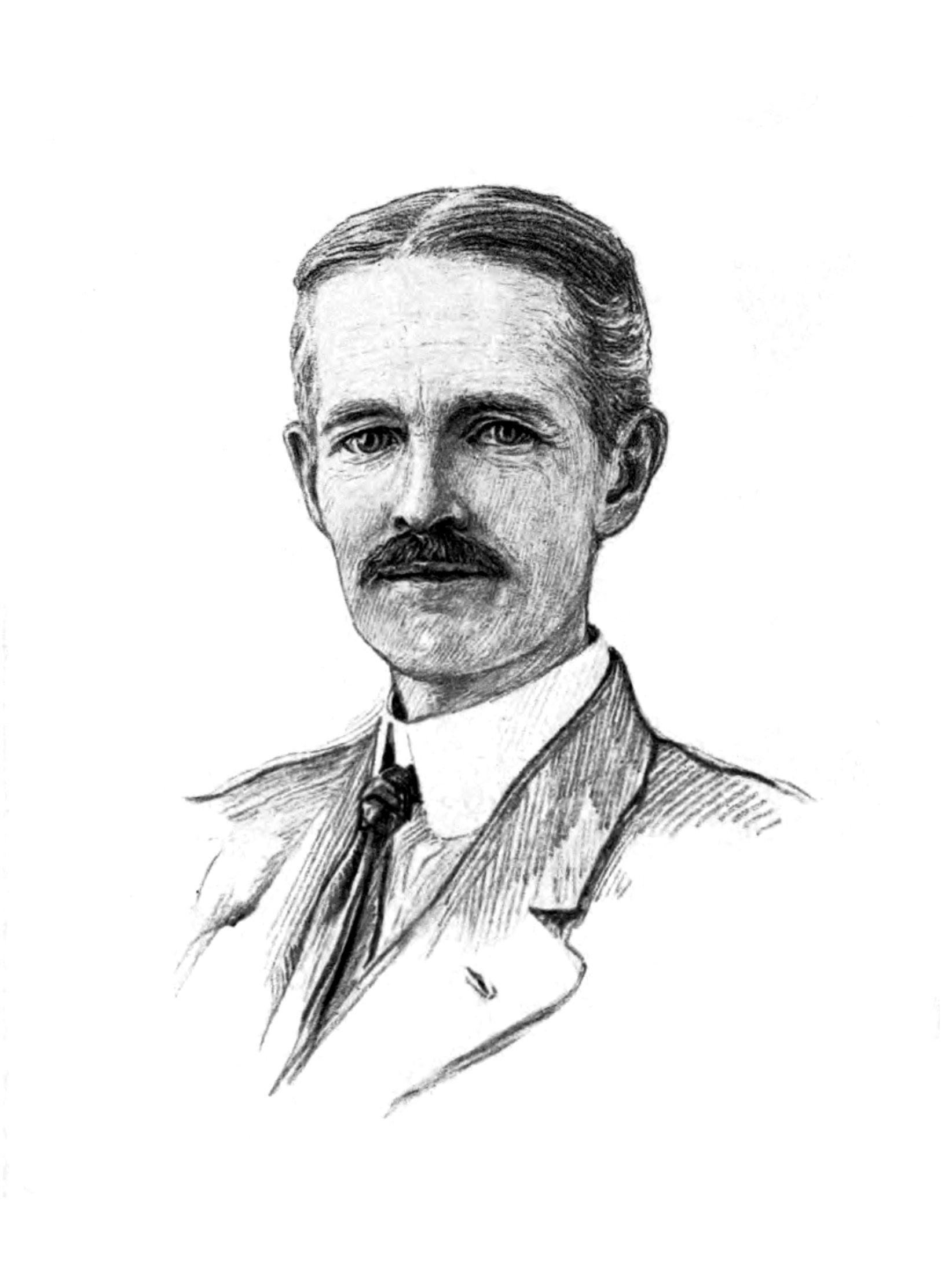

Luther Samuel Livingston (July 6, 1864 – December 24, 1914) was an American bibliophile and scholar. He was the first curator of the Harry Elkins Widener Collection at Harvard University, but died just a few weeks after being appointed. George Parker Winship took up the position in 1915 with Livingston's widow Flora as his assistant.

== Sources ==
- Luther S. Livingston, 1864–1914
- https://www.jstor.org/stable/24292228?seq=1#page_scan_tab_contents
- https://www.americanantiquarian.org/proceedings/44806581.pdf
