= Whorton =

Whorton is a surname. Notable people with the surname include:

- Isaac Whorton (born 1980), American politician
- J. M. Whorton, the owner of an automobile sales business
- Ritchie Whorton (born 1960), American politician
- Ant Whorton-Eales (born 1994), British racing driver

== See also ==
- Whorton v. Bockting, 549 U.S. 406 (2007), a United States Supreme Court case
- John Hart Whorton House, located in Appleton, Wisconsin, United States
- Warton (disambiguation)
- Wharton (disambiguation)
- Worton (disambiguation)
