= William Elkins =

William Elkins or Elkin may refer to:

- William Henry Pferinger Elkins (1883–1964), Canadian soldier
- William Lukens Elkins (1832–1903), American businessman
- William McIntire Elkins (1882–1947), American collector of rare books and Dickensiana
- William Lewis Elkin (1855–1933), American astronomer
