= Elkins Park, Pennsylvania =

Unincorporated community in Pennsylvania, US

Elkins Park, Pennsylvania Ogontz Shoemakertown
- Census-designated place
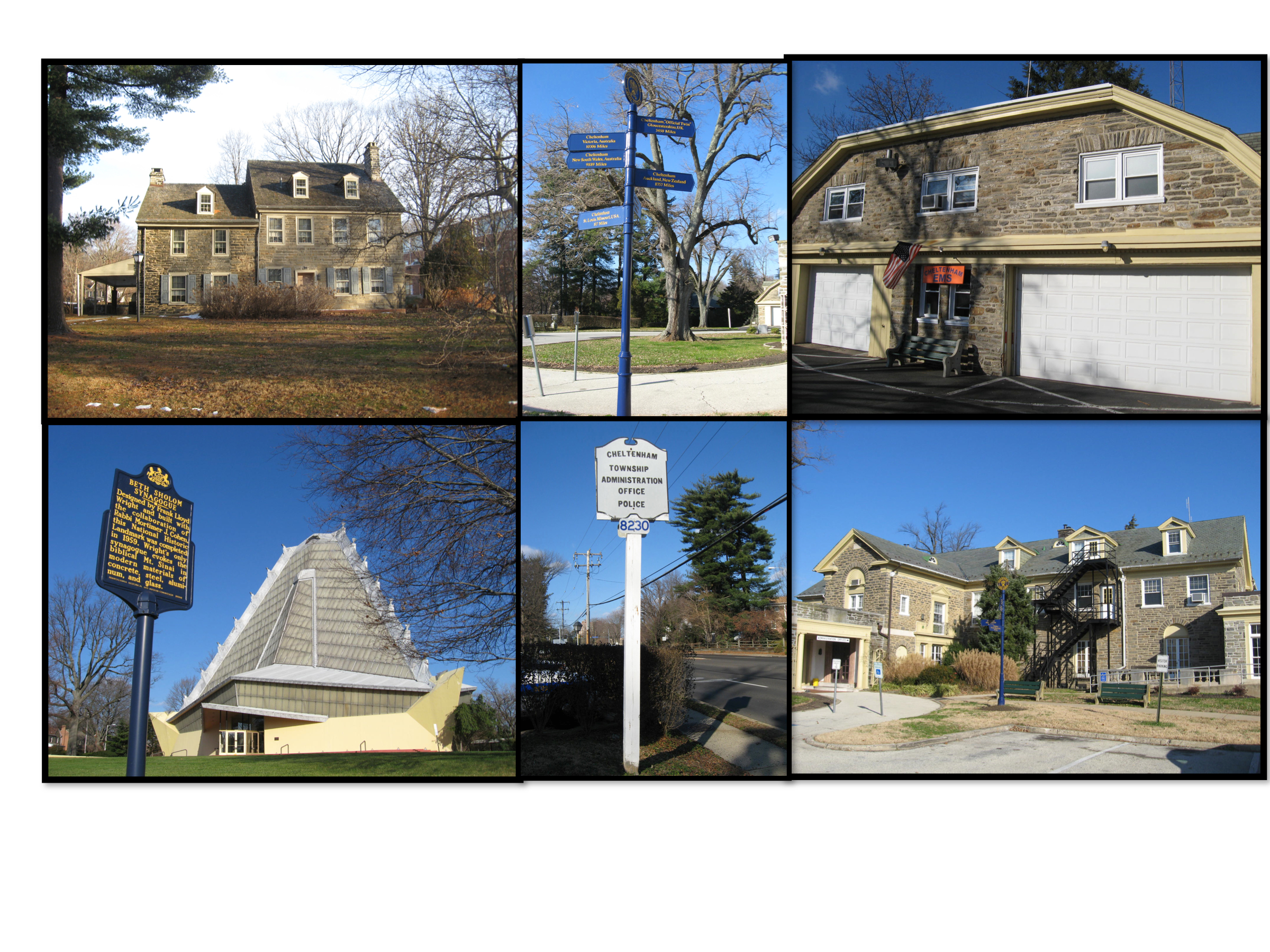
- Clockwise from top, Wall House, Cheltenham Twinning Fingerpost, Cheltenham EMS Building, Cheltenham Township Municipal Building, Township Police Headquarters sign on Old York Road, Beth Shalom Synagogue
- Nickname: EP
- Location of Elkins Park in Pennsylvania Elkins Park, Pennsylvania (the United States)
- Coordinates: 40°04′37″N 75°07′37″W
- Country: United States
- State: Pennsylvania
- County: Montgomery
- Townships: Abington, Cheltenham
- Commissioners: Ann L. Rappoport (West); Mitchell Zygmund-Felt (Central); Brad M. Pransky (West)

Area
  - Total: 1.74 sq mi (4.51 km^{2})
  - Land: 1.74 sq mi (4.51 km^{2})
  - Water: 0 sq mi (0.00 km^{2})
- Elevation: 157 ft (48 m)

Population (2020)
  - Total: 6,901
  - Density: 3,963.1/sq mi (1,530.18/km^{2})
- Time zone: UTC-5 (Eastern Standard Time)
  - Summer (DST): UTC-4 (Eastern Daylight Time)
- ZIP Code: 19027
- Area codes: 215, 267 and 445
- FIPS code: 42-23128

Elkins Park is an unincorporated community in Montgomery County, Pennsylvania, United States. It is split between Cheltenham and Abington Townships in the northern suburbs outside of Philadelphia, which it borders along Cheltenham Avenue roughly 7 miles (11 km) from Center City. The community is four station stops from Center City on Septa Regional Rail. It was listed as a census-designated place prior to the 2020 census.

Historically, Elkins Park was home to Philadelphia's early 20th century business elite, among them John B. Stetson, John Wanamaker, Henry W. Breyer, Jay Cooke, William Lukens Elkins, and Peter A.B. Widener. In the later 20th century, it was home to Ralph J. Roberts, co-founder of Comcast, as well as to the Gimbel family, the founders of Gimbels, founders of the department store chain.

Today, it remains home to many gilded age mansions such as Lynnewood Hall, a 110-room, neoclassical estate, the Elkins Estate presently being restored as a hotel-spa, distillery and events center and the Henry West Breyer Sr. House, the former residence of the ice cream magnate which now serves as the Cheltenham Township Municipal building.

In 2018, New York Magazine described Elkins Park as "an old, elegant neighborhood of close-clustered homes". It is notable for its varied architectural styles (among them: Modern, American colonial and Dutch colonial, Queen Anne, English Cottage and Tudor) its wealth of homes designed by renowned 19th and 20th century architects such as Horace Trumbauer, Louis Kahn and Robert A.M. Stern and its diversity of religious institutions. With six synagogues it also makes up the foundation of the "Old York Road Corridor" of the Philadelphia area Jewish community, supported by the approximately 25,000 Jews in the Cheltenham-Jenkintown-Abington region. Seasonally Elkins Park hosts a variety of religious and cultural festivals such as the "Taste of Greece" food festival, the Romanian food festival, the Serbian food festival, various Jewish festivals such as a multi-congregation Purim celebration, and arts festivals like "Arts in the Park".

Though distinct communities, the neighborhoods of Melrose Park and historic La Mott share a postal code with Elkins Park.

== Demographics ==
Historical population
Census	Pop.	Note	%±
2020	6,901		—
U.S. Decennial Census

As of 2021, the US Census QuickFacts reports that Elkins Park is 62.6% white alone, 27.6% Black or African American, 4.9% two or more races, 4.2% Hispanic or Latino, and 3.8% Asian alone.

The total population was 6,901 people according to 2020 Census figures.

The median household income in 2022 dollars was $121,135, the median family income was $158,000 and the median income for married-couple families was $180,189. The per capita income was $72,072.

== Points of interest ==
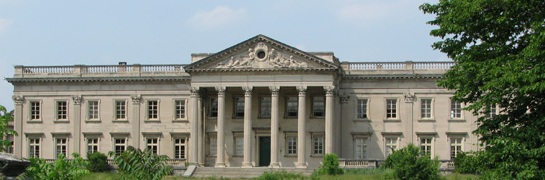
Lynnewood Hall, a 110-room, Gilded Age mansion

- Beth Sholom Synagogue, the only synagogue designed by Frank Lloyd Wright
- Elkins Estate, former family summer home of Pennsylvania Railroad magnate William L. Elkins
- High School Park, an 11-acre park with four distinct ecosystems, was the original grounds of Cheltenham High School and became a township park in 1996 after the building burned down
- Lynnewood Hall, a 110-room, Gilded Age mansion
- St. Paul's Episcopal Church, added to the National Register of Historic Places in 1982
- Richard Wall House Museum, a house listed on State and National Registers of Historic Places, had the distinction of being the oldest Pennsylvania house in continuous residence until rehabilitation work began, now a museum

== Government ==
Elkins Park is split between Cheltenham and Abington Townships in the suburbs outside of Philadelphia. It is represented by Madeleine Dean in Pennsylvania's 4th congressional district.

== Schools ==
=== Public schools ===
The portion in Cheltenham Township is zoned to Cheltenham Township School District.

- Myers Elementary School (Kindergarten through 5th grade)
- Wyncote Elementary serves West Elkins Park (Kindergarten through 5th grade)
- Cedarbrook East (6th grade) - temporary facility
- Cedarbrook Middle School (7th and 8th grade)
- Cheltenham High School (9th grade through 12th grade)

The portion in Abington Township is zoned to Abington School District.

- McKinley Elementary School (Kindergarten through 5th grade)
- Abington Middle School (6th grade through 8th grade)
- Abington High School (9th grade through 12th grade)

=== Private ===
- Mesivta Yesodei Yisroel of Elkins Park
- Perelman Jewish Day School
- Wyncote Academy

=== Tertiary ===
- Alvernia University's Philadelphia campus
- Gratz College
- Drexel University Elkins Park Campus
- Westminster Theological Seminary
- Yeshiva Gedolah of Elkins Park
- The former campus of the Tyler School of Art, the art school of Temple University.

== Transportation ==
=== Public transportation ===
Elkins Park is served by SEPTA Regional Rail trains on the Glenside Line, Warminster Line, West Trenton Line and Lansdale/Doylestown Line at the Elkins Park station. The Jenkintown and Melrose Park stations are also found near the neighborhood of Elkins Park, and are served by the same regional rail lines. SEPTA bus routes 28, 55, 70 and 77 also provide service to Elkins Park.

=== Road ===
Toward the western end of Elkins Park is Pennsylvania Route 611 (Old York Road). In Elkins Park, Pennsylvania Route 73 runs along Township Line Road, mostly marking the border between Cheltenham and Abington townships.

== Notable people ==
- Laurie Halse Anderson, American writer, lived in Elkins Park
- Jay Ansill, composer and folk musician
- Jenna Arnold, American businessperson, author, and a national organizer for the Women's March on Washington
- Melissa Bank, American author, grew up in Elkins Park
- Jan Berenstain and Stan Berenstain, writers and illustrators best known for creating the children's book series The Berenstain Bears
- Michael S. Brown, Nobel prize winner in medicine or physiology
- Ilene Chaiken, American television producer, director, writer, and founder of Little Chicken Productions
- Wilt Chamberlain, American professional basketball player who played center and is widely regarded as one of the greatest players in the sport's history, lived in Elkins Park
- Bill Cosby, stand-up comedian, actor, and author
- Eleanor Widener Dixon, socialite and philanthropist
- Douglas Feith, former Under Secretary of Defense for Policy, grew up in Elkins Park
- Marvin Harrison, NFL wide receiver for the Indianapolis Colts
- Lil Dicky, rapper and comedian
- William Lukens Elkins, oil and transport magnate
- William McIntire Elkins, rare book collector
- Mark Levin, radio talk show host
- Edgar Lee Masters, poet; spent his final years in Elkins Park
- Mary Ellen Mark, photojournalist
- Benjamin Netanyahu, Prime Minister of Israel
- Yonatan Netanyahu, Israeli soldier and brother of Benjamin Netanyahu
- Raymond Perelman, American businessman and philanthropist
- Ike Richman, personal attorney for National Basketball Association player Wilt Chamberlain and a co-owner of the Philadelphia 76ers
- Ralph J. Roberts, co-founder of Comcast; father of current Comcast chief executive officer, Brian L. Roberts
- Jeffrey Solow, classical cellist and academic
- Richard Suckle, American film producer; one of several producers nominated for an Academy Award for Best Picture for the 2013 film American Hustle
- Eleanor Elkins Widener, founder of Widener Library at Harvard University to honor her son
- Harry Elkins Widener, grandson of Peter A. B. Widener and namesake of Widener Library at Harvard University; born in Elkins Park and died on the Titanic
- Peter A. B. Widener, head of a wealthy and historically prominent family
- Bernard Wolfman, Dean of the University of Pennsylvania Law School

=== Fictional characters ===
- Betty Draper (January Jones), a main character on AMC's television series Mad Men

== In popular culture ==
In the AMC period drama television series Mad Men, the character Betty Draper was raised in the "tiny Philadelphia suburb of Elkins Park, Pennsylvania". During the show's second season, Betty's father has a series of strokes, and is taken to "Elkins Park Hospital". This would have actually been the former Rolling Hill Hospital, which opened in 1953, and is now known as MossRehab and Einstein at Elkins Park, part of the Einstein Healthcare Network.

Ann Patchett's 2019 novel The Dutch House is primarily set in Elkins Park.

== See also ==
- Philadelphia
- Elkins Estate
- Montgomery County, Pennsylvania
- Cheltenham Township, Pennsylvania
- Abington Township, Pennsylvania
- The Dutch House
