= Michael Warton =

Michael Warton or Wharton may refer to:

- Michael Wharton (1913–2006), British newspaper columnist
- Michael Wharton (died 1590), MP for Beverley
- Michael Warton (died 1688) (1623–1688), English politician
- Michael Warton (died 1645) (1593–1645), English politician
- Michael Warton (died 1725), English politician, Member of Parliament for Beverley
- Mike Wharton, British politician

== See also ==
- Michael (given name)
- Warton (surname)
