= Warton =

Warton may refer to:

== Places in England ==
- Warton, Fylde, a village between Preston and Lytham St. Annes, Lancashire
  - Bryning-with-Warton, civil parish containing Warton
  - Warton Aerodrome, a BAE Systems airfield near the above village
- Warton, Lancaster, a village in north Lancashire
- Warton, Northumberland, a hamlet near Rothbury
- Warton, Warwickshire

== Other uses ==
- Warton (surname), including a list of people with the name

== See also ==
- Wharton (disambiguation)
