= William Lukens Elkins =

American businessman and art collector

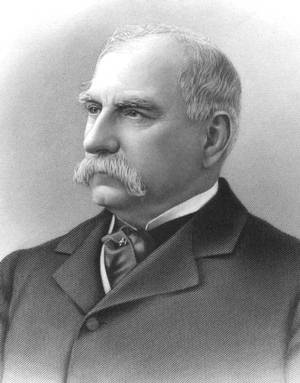
- Elkins in 1899
- Born: May 2, 1832; Wheeling, Virginia, U.S.
- Died: November 7, 1903 (aged 71); Elkins Estate, Elkins Park, Pennsylvania, U.S.
- Resting place: Laurel Hill Cemetery, Philadelphia, Pennsylvania, U.S.
- Occupations: Businessman, investor, art collector
- Board member of: Philadelphia Rapid Transit Co.; Pennsylvania Railroad Co.; United Gas Improvement Co.; Metropolitan Street Railway Co. of New York; Commercial Trust Company; Land Title & Trust Co.; American Surety Company of New York; International Navigation Co.; Philadelphia & Erie Co.; Consolidated Traction Company of New Jersey; Edison Electric Light Co.; Pennsylvania Globe Gas Light Co.; Consolidated Traction Company of Pittsburgh; Continental Tobacco Company; Philadelphia Electric Co.; Electric Company of America; Virginia & Charleston Railway Co.; American Air Power Co.; Electric Storage Battery Co.; New England Gas & Coke Co.; Asphalt Company of America
- Spouse: Maria Louise Broomall
- Children: 4, including Eleanor

William Lukens Elkins (May 2, 1832 – November 7, 1903) was an American businessman and art collector. He began his working career as a grocer in Philadelphia and became a business tycoon with financial interests in oil, natural gas, and transportation. He was one of the first to convert oil to gasoline and became a founding partner and major shareholder of Standard Oil after selling his refining business to John D. Rockefeller. He partnered with Peter Widener to found the Philadelphia Rapid Transit Company and developed streetcar and railway systems throughout several major cities in the United States. He founded the United Gas Improvement Company and was a member of the board of directors of 24 companies. He was a collector of art and filled his Elkins Estate with over 132 paintings. The exact value of his estate at the time of death is unknown, though today it would likely be worth several billion dollars.

== Early life ==
Elkins was born in Wheeling, West Virginia, on May 2, 1832, the seventh child and youngest son to George Elkins and Susanne (née Howell) Elkins. His father was a pioneer in paper manufacturing in the United States.

In 1840, his family returned to Philadelphia, where William continued his education in the local schools. His family was a prominent family in colonial-era Philadelphia, with roots from England.

== Career ==
He started his business career working as a clerk at a grocery store in Philadelphia. He entered the lumber business but did not have success. In 1852, he entered the produce business in New York and had modest success. In 1853, he returned to Philadelphia and formed a partnership with Peter Sayboldt to found the produce company Sayboldt & Elkins. By 1860, Elkins bought out his partner and built the produce operation into the largest store of its kind in the United States.

Elkins recognized the potential for the usages of oil being pumped from the oilfields of Northwestern Pennsylvania and became a pioneer in the refining of crude oil. In Philadelphia he founded Monument Oil Works that built a primitive oil refinery which he constantly modernized and expanded into other locations. His company was one of the first to make gasoline and was involved in the production of asphalt. His refining business grew until he was producing 20,000 barrels of gasoline a month. In 1875, Elkins entered into a partnership with Standard Oil and remained a significant shareholder.

In 1873, William Elkins met Peter Widener and the two became trusted friends. Together they started the Philadelphia Rapid Transit Company, a streetcar and railway business. Elkins and Widener expanded their streetcar enterprise to major cities across the United States including New York, Chicago, Baltimore, St. Louis, Cincinnati and Pittsburgh. Elkins founded the United Gas Improvement Company which implemented gas works in Philadelphia and 60 U.S. cities. He was a member of the board of directors of 24 companies. Elkins held sizeable financial positions in American Tobacco Company and International Mercantile Marine Co.

Elkins was also involved in real estate and partnered with Widener to purchase large tracts of land in North Philadelphia and build several thousand houses for sale.

He served on the Philadelphia City Council for one year in 1876 and served as aide-de-camp with the rank of colonel to Governor John F. Hartranft. He served as commissioner to represent Philadelphia at the International Expositions in Vienna in 1873 and Paris in 1900.

== Elkins estate ==
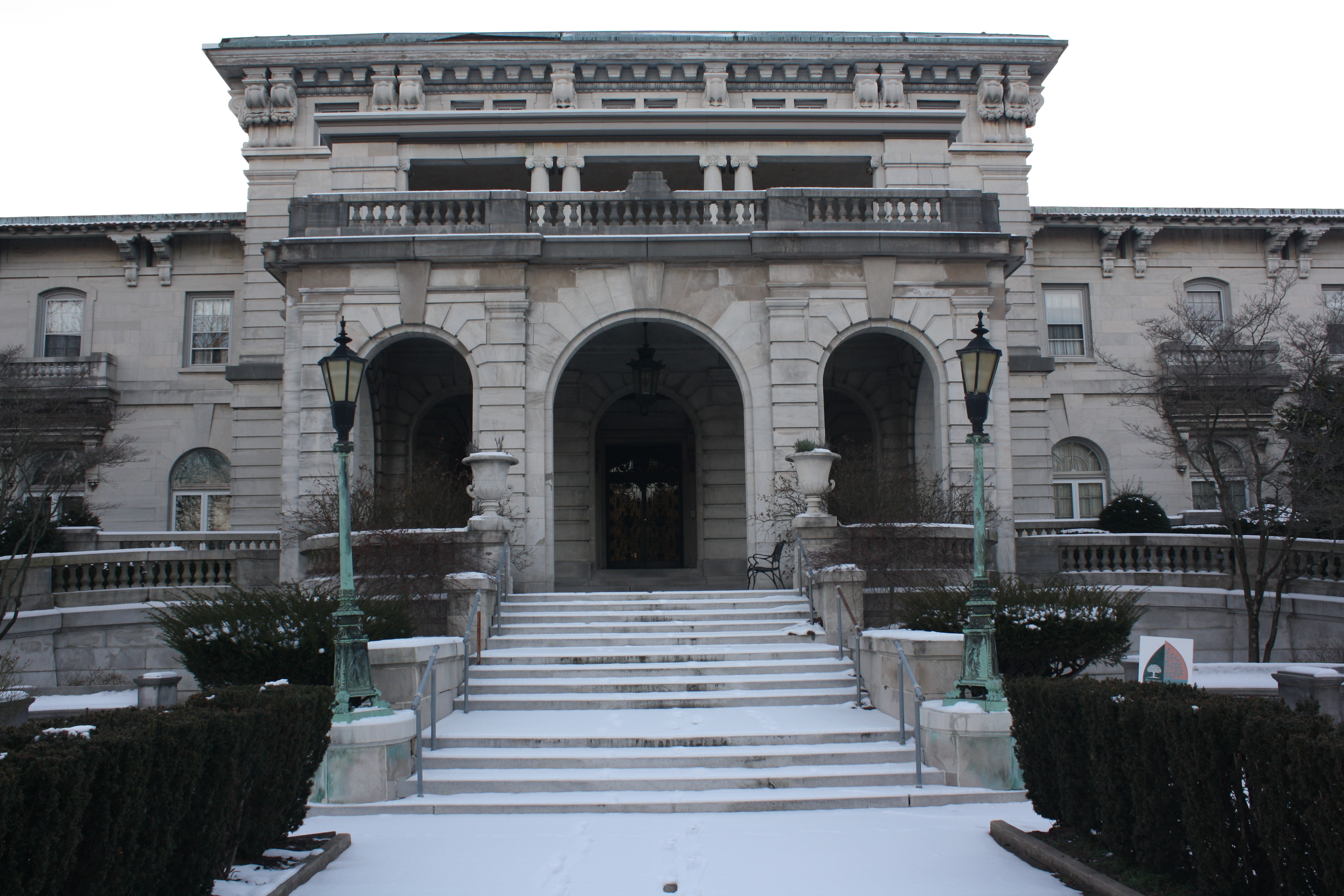
Elstowe Manor

In 1898, Elkins built a grand 45-room mansion named Elstowe Manor for himself and a mansion named Chelten House for his son on the 42-acre Elkins Estate in Elkins Park, Pennsylvania. Both mansions were designed by Horace Trumbauer.

Elkins was an art collector and instituted a $5,000 prize for "the most meritorious" painting exhibited by an American artist at the Pennsylvania Academy of Fine Arts. In 1900, he published a catalogue of his personal art collections which contained 132 paintings.

== Personal life ==
In 1858, William Elkins married Maria Louise Broomall, with whom he had two daughters and two sons:

- Ida Ameila Elkins (1859–1904), who married Sidney Frederick Tyler (1850–1935), bearing no children.
- Eleanor Elkins (1861–1937), who married George Dunton Widener, with whom she had three children, and lost her husband and eldest son, Harry, in the April 15, 1912 sinking of RMS Titanic. The Widener Library was donated by Eleanor Elkins upon his death to Harvard University in memoriam.
- George W. Elkins (1858–1919), who married Stella McIntire (1861–1913) and had four children. After her death, he married Allethaire Chase Ludlow (1880–1977).
- William L. Elkins, Jr. (1863–1902), who married Kate Felton, the daughter of Charles N. Felton, United States Congressman and Senator from California.

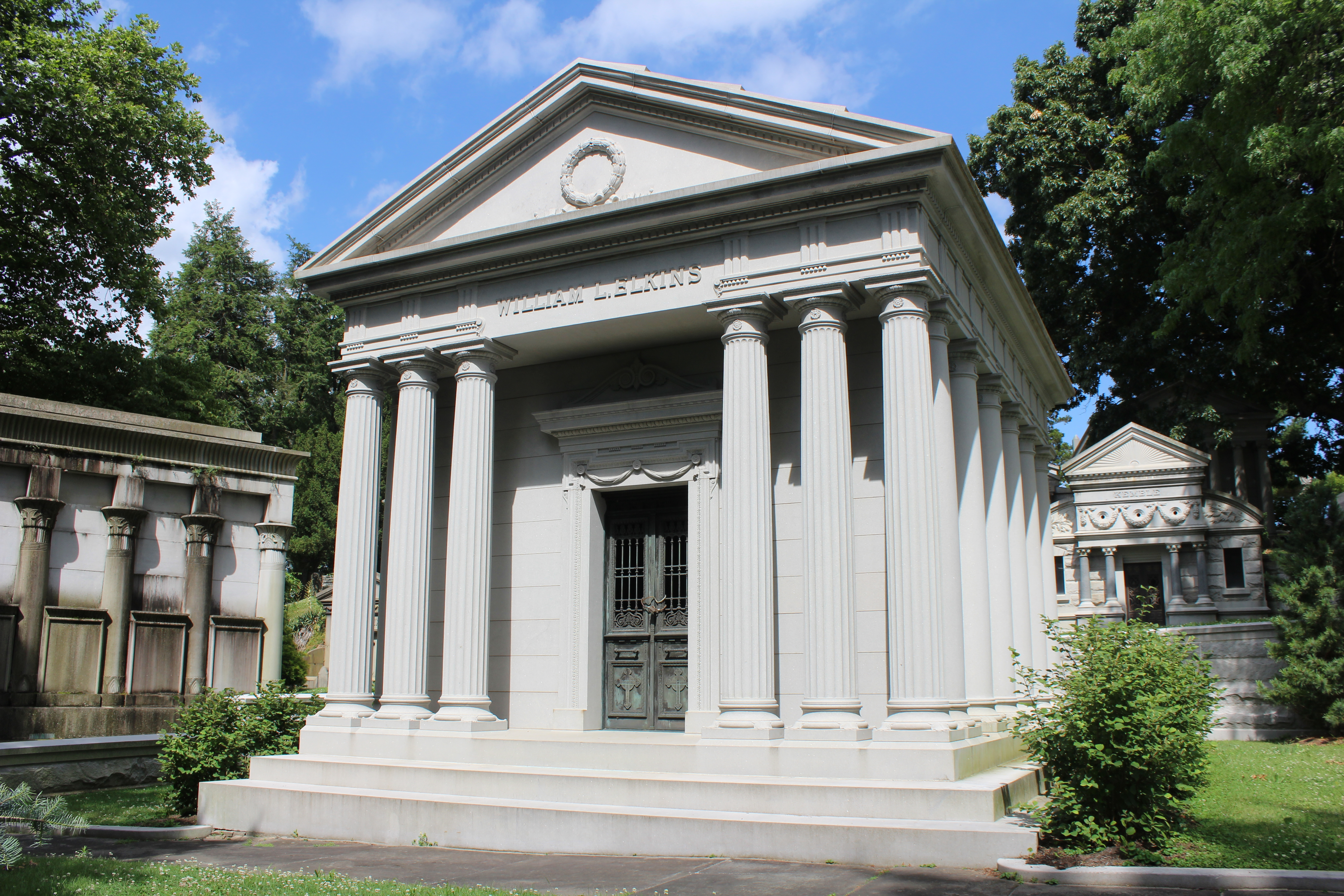
William L. Elkins Mausoleum in Laurel Hill Cemetery

William Elkins died at his summer home, at age seventy-one on November 7, 1903, in Elkins Park, Pennsylvania. He was interred at Laurel Hill Cemetery in Philadelphia. He left behind a grand fortune, consisting mostly of his art collection and sizable positions in the United Gas Improvement Company, Standard Oil, Philadelphia Rapid Transit Company, American Tobacco Company, Philadelphia Electric Company, and the International Mercantile Marine Company. He owned and displayed coveted artworks, including works from Raphael, Rembrandt, Diego Velázquez, Thomas Gainsborough, Winslow Homer, Claude Monet, Édouard Manet, and Jacob van Ruisdael. Among his philanthropic gifts, William Elkins left $240,000 to the Masonic Home for Girls in Philadelphia. He bequeathed his art collection to the city to be given following the death of his last heir.

=== Descendants ===
Through his son George, he was the grandfather of four grandchildren. They included Stella Elkins, who married George F. Tyler and founded the Stella Elkins Tyler School of Art. Another granddaughter, Louise Elkins, married Wharton Sinkler, a descendant of the William Penn and Wharton families. A grandson, William McIntire Elkins, was a book collector whose collection of early Americana is held at the Free Library of Philadelphia. Through his son William, he was the grandfather of two grandchildren: Felton Broomall Elkins, a playwright and artist, and Marie Louise Broomall Elkins, who married three times and was a Broadway producer.

== Sources ==
- Leach, Josiah Granville (1898). Genealogical and Biographical Memorial of the Reading, Howell, Yerkes, Watts, Latham, and Elkins Families. J.B. Lippincott Company.
