= Henry West Breyer Sr. House =

Historic house in Pennsylvania, United States

- Henry W. Breyer Sr. House
- U.S. National Register of Historic Places
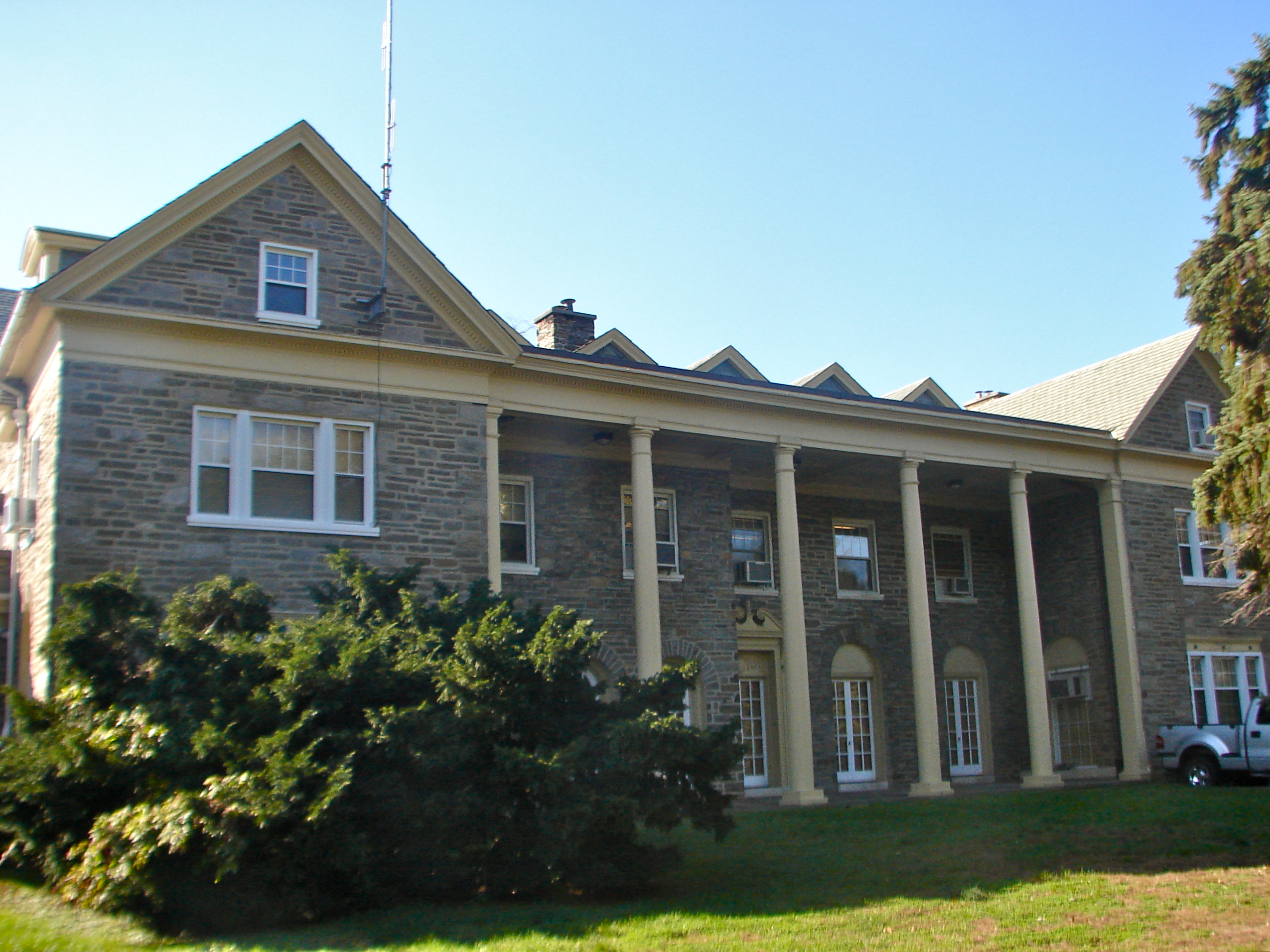
- Henry West Breyer Sr. House, November 2011

- Location within Philadelphia
- Location: 8230 Old York Rd., Elkins Park, Pennsylvania
- Coordinates: 40°4′53″N 75°7′41″W
- Area: 2 acres (0.81 ha)
- Built: 1915
- Architect: Koelle, Speth & Co.
- Architectural style: Colonial Revival
- NRHP reference No.: 04000065
- Added to NRHP: February 20, 2004

The Henry W. Breyer Sr. House, also known as Haredith and officially known today as the Cheltenham Township Municipal Building, is an historic property which is located in Elkins Park, Montgomery County, Pennsylvania, United States.

Added to the National Register of Historic Places in 2004, it is located across the street from National Historic Landmark Beth Sholom Synagogue.

== History and architectural features ==
Built in 1915, this historic structure is a large 2 1/2-story, irregularly-shaped, stone dwelling, which was designed in the Colonial Revival style. It features a full-height porch supported by four Doric order columns. Also located on the property is a contributing garage. The house was built by Henry W. Breyer Sr., owner of Breyers Ice Cream. The house was purchased by Cheltenham Township in 1956, and was then converted to office space.

== Gallery ==
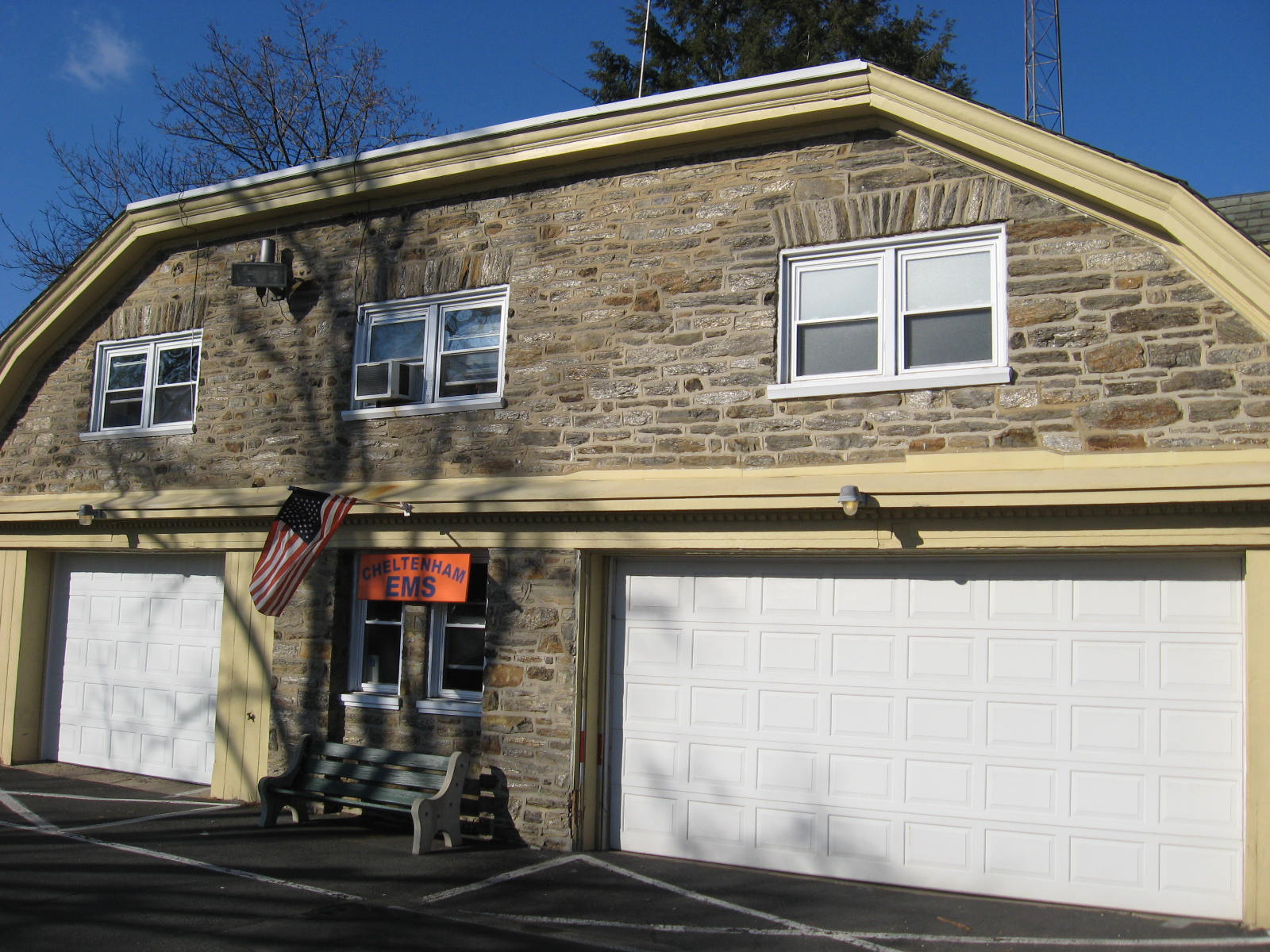
The Cheltenham EMS building at the Township Building

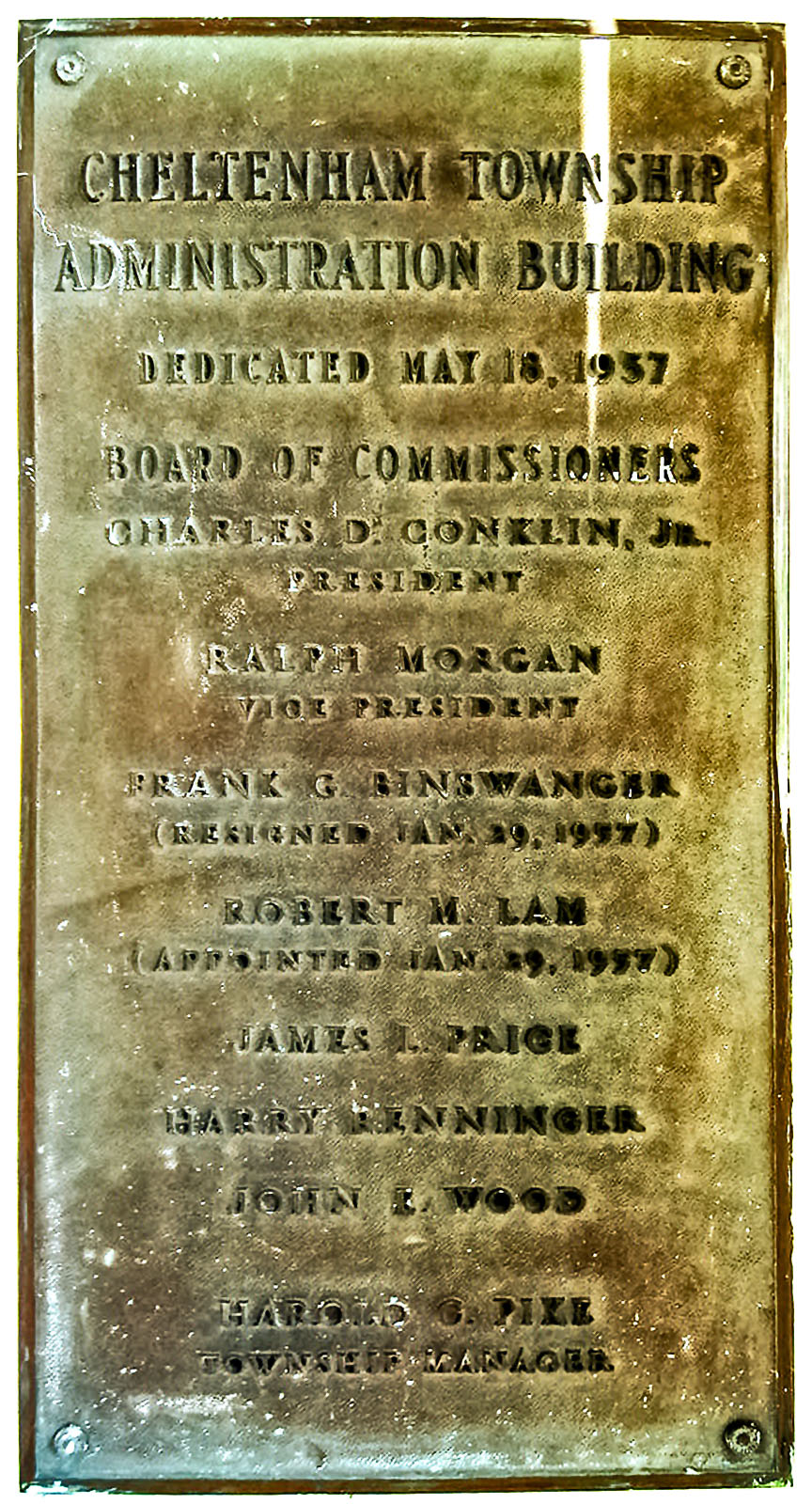
Township building dedication plaque

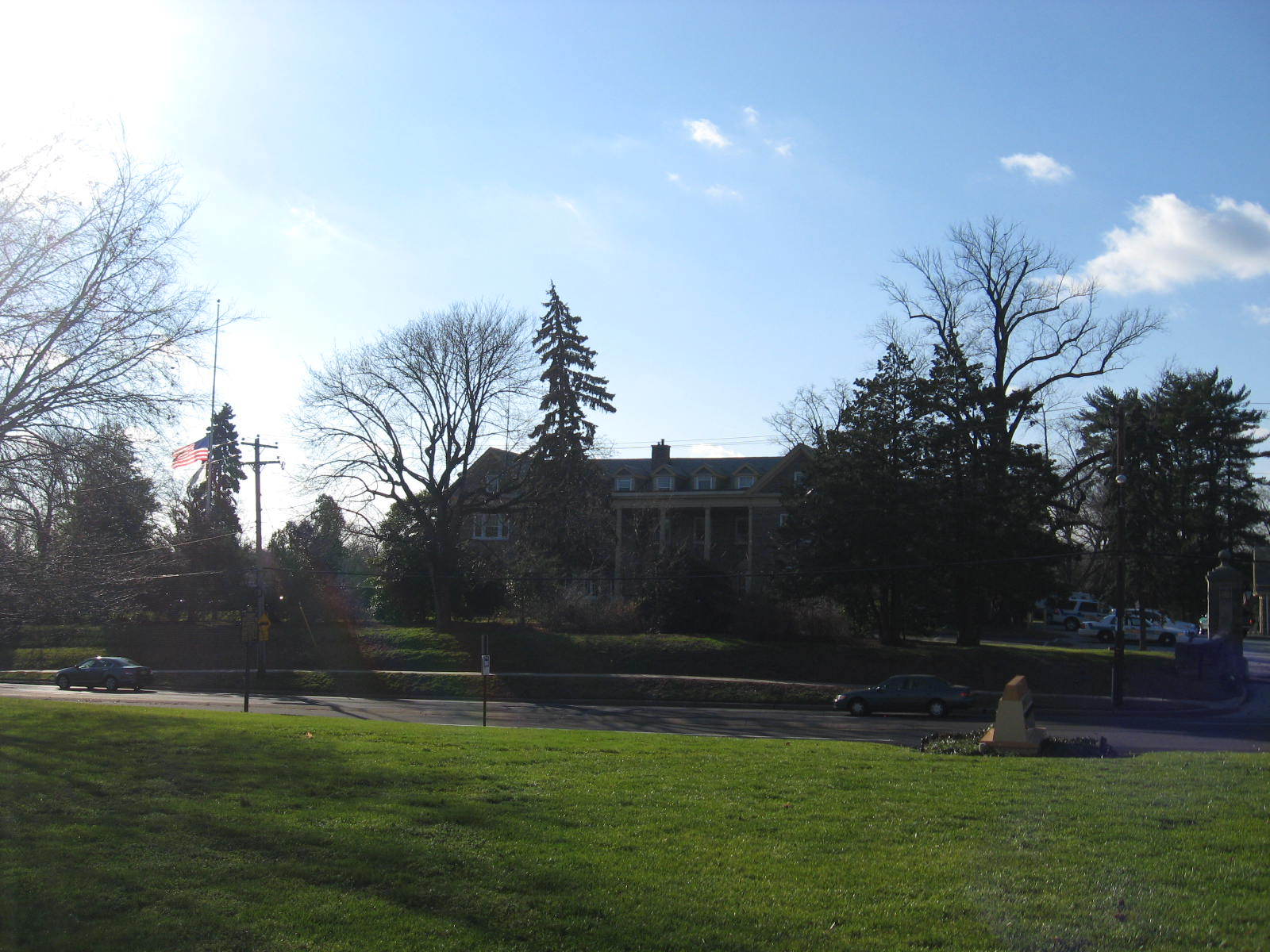
As viewed from the lawn of Beth Sholom Congregation

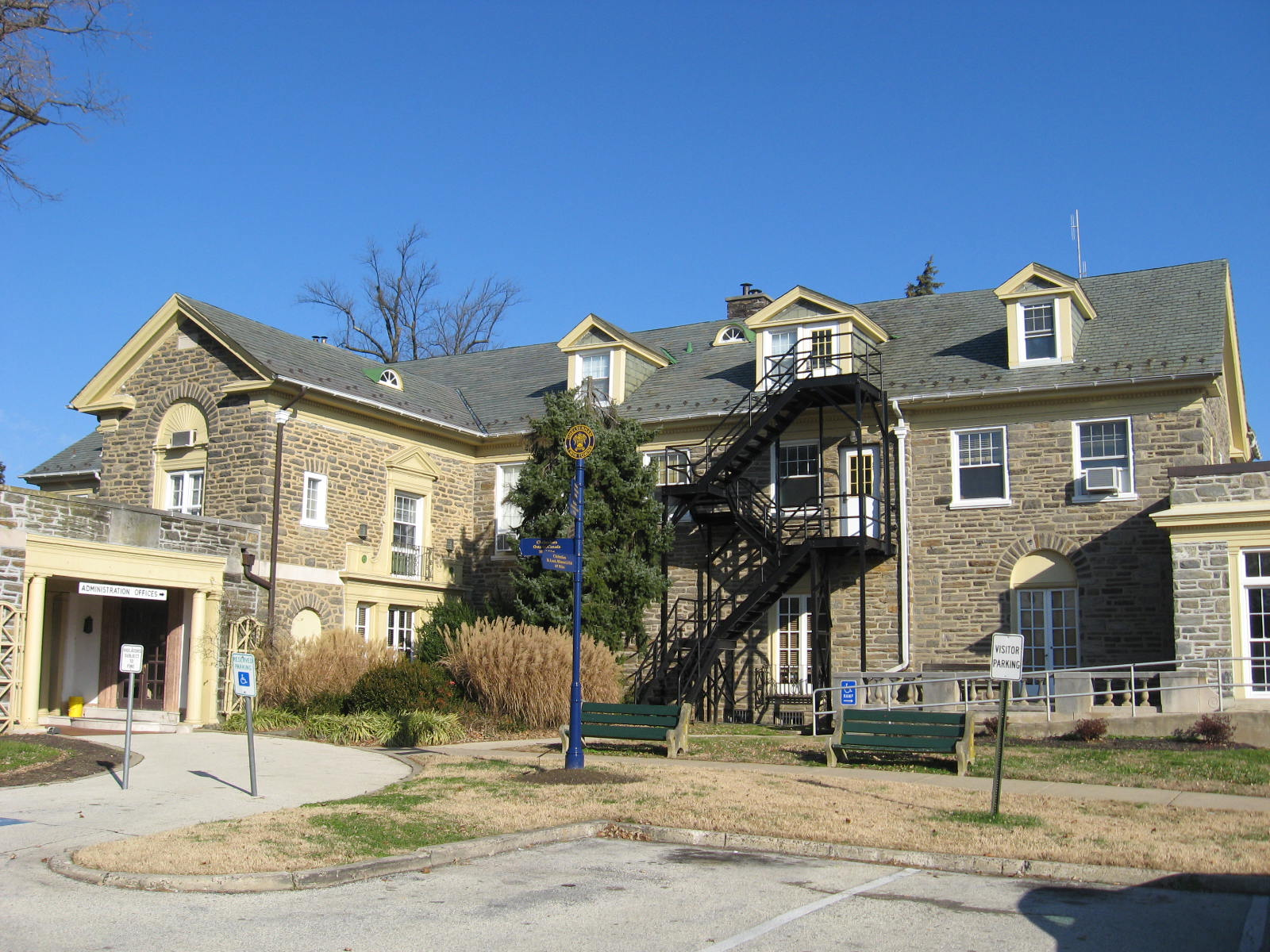
Back view of the building

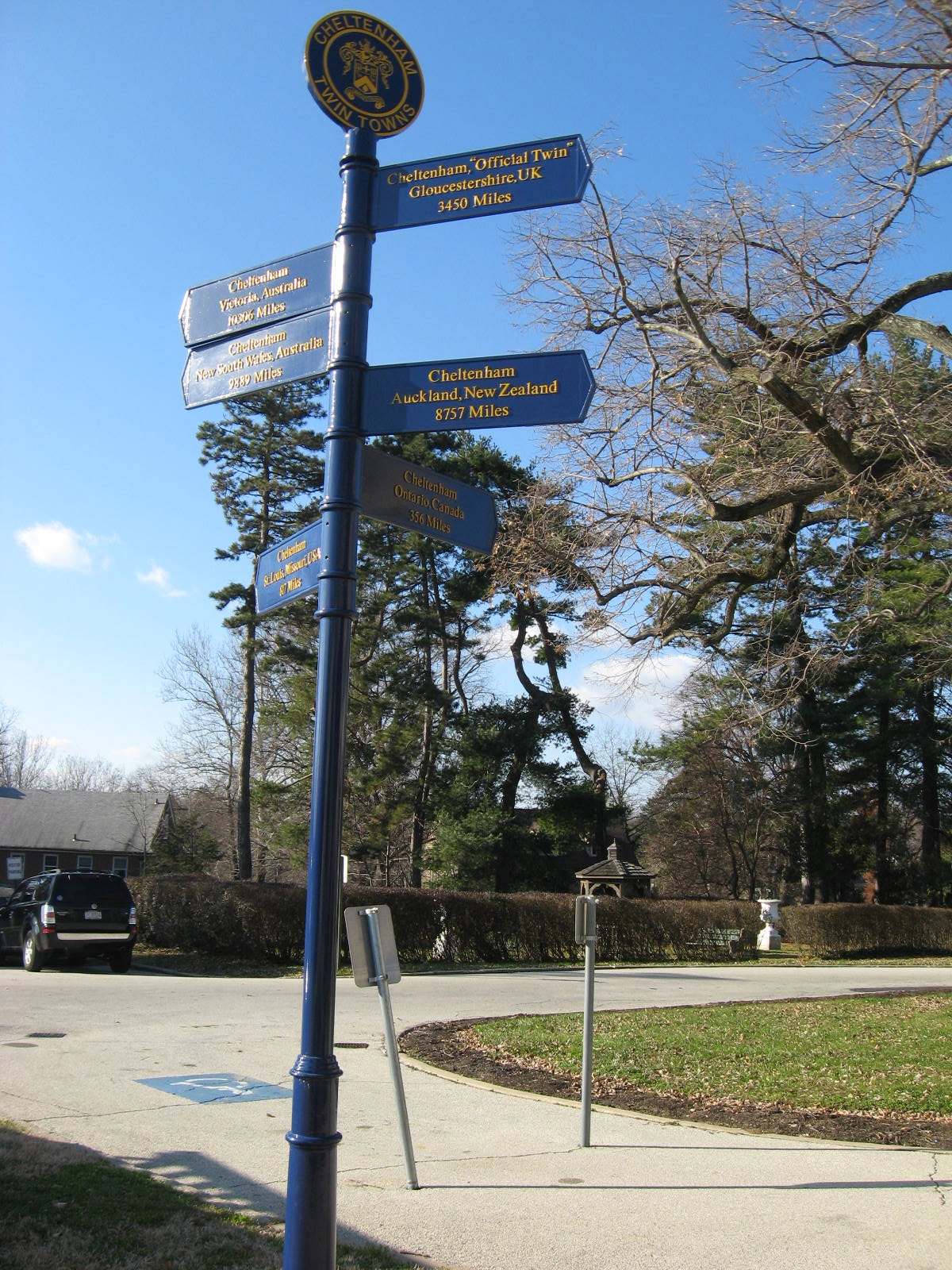
Cheltenham Twinning Fingerpost

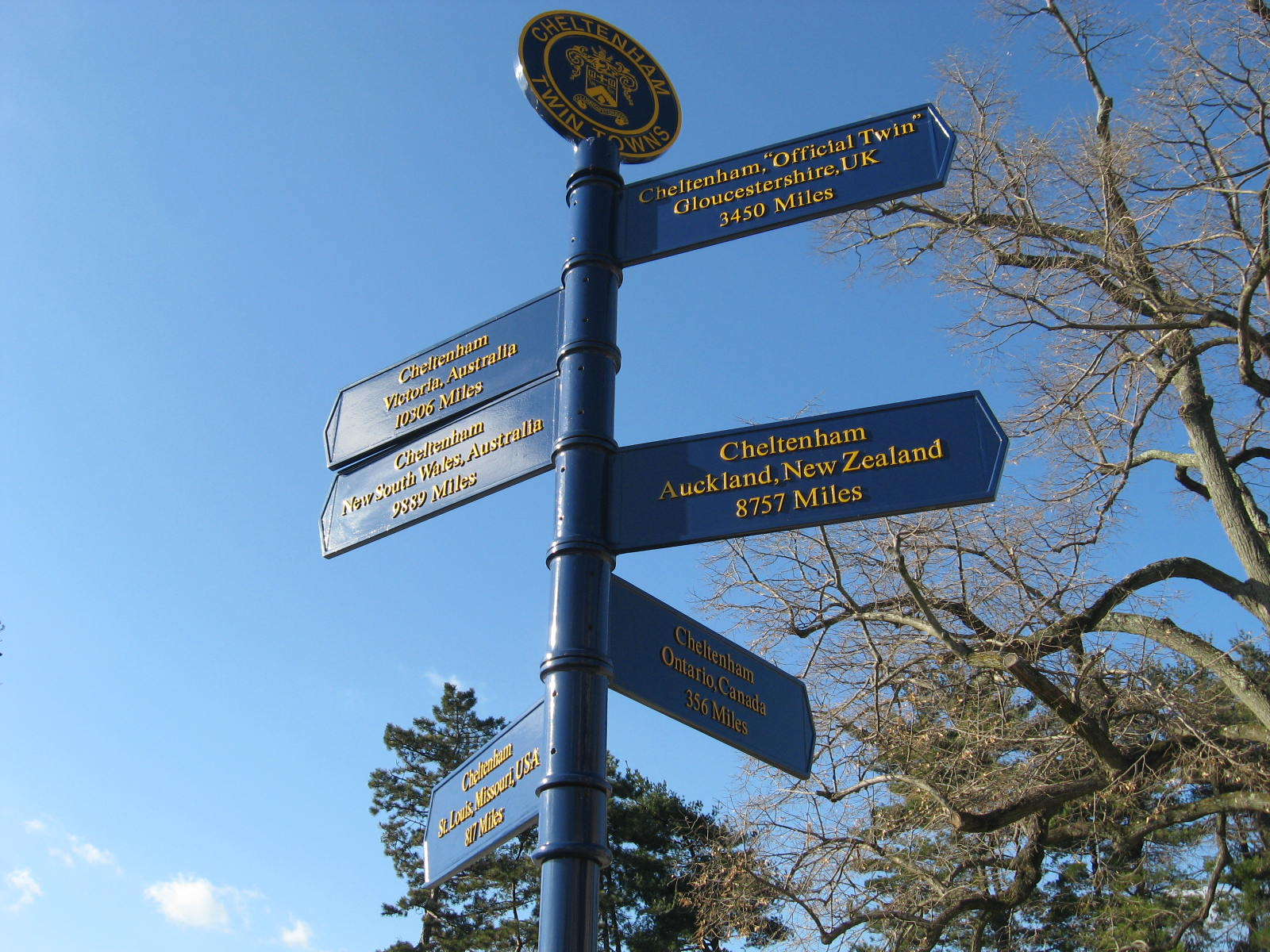
Close-up of the Twin Towns

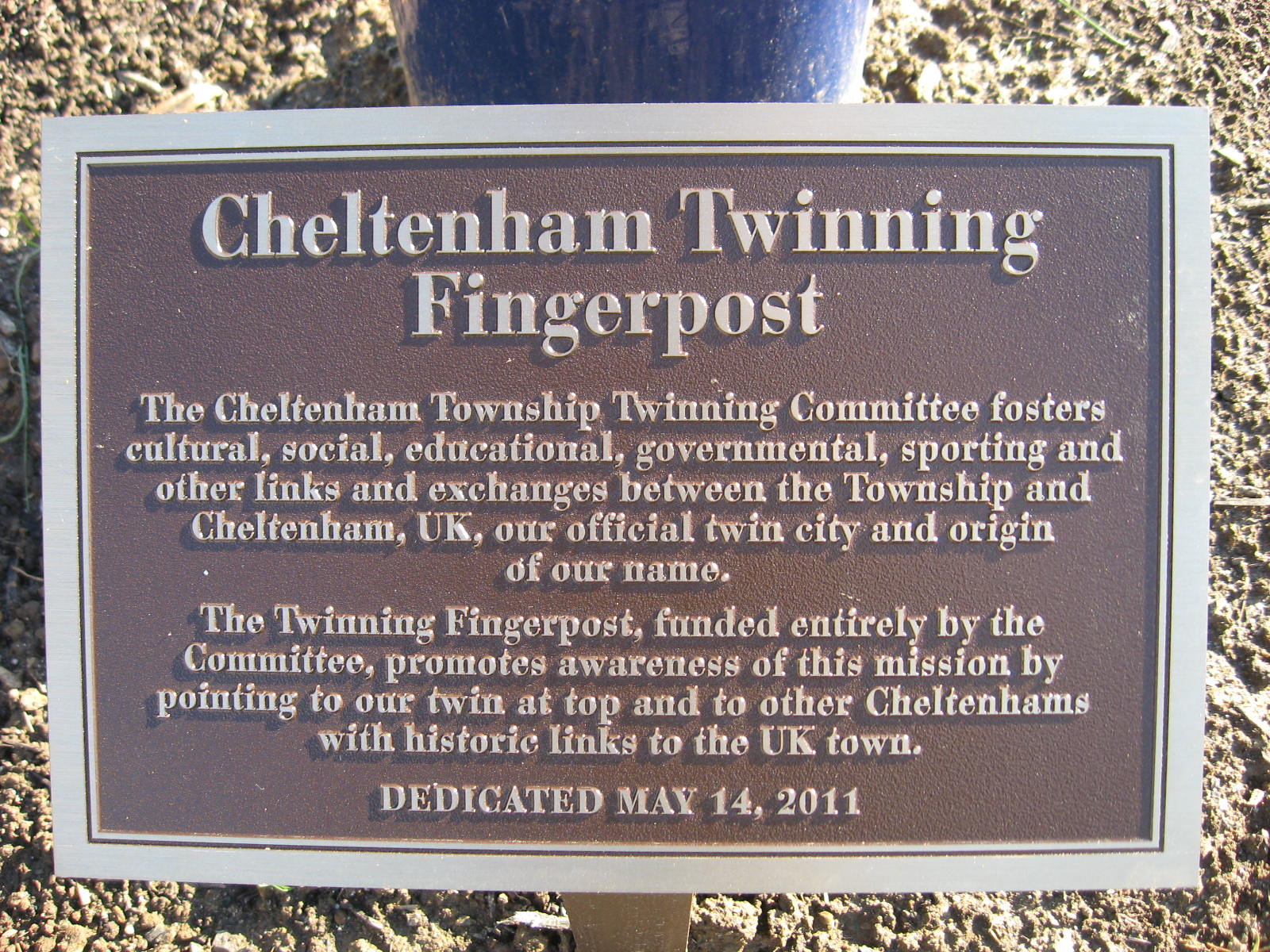
Twin Towns memorial plaque
