= Richard Wall house =

Historic house in Pennsylvania, United States

- Wall House
- U.S. National Register of Historic Places
- Pennsylvania state historical marker
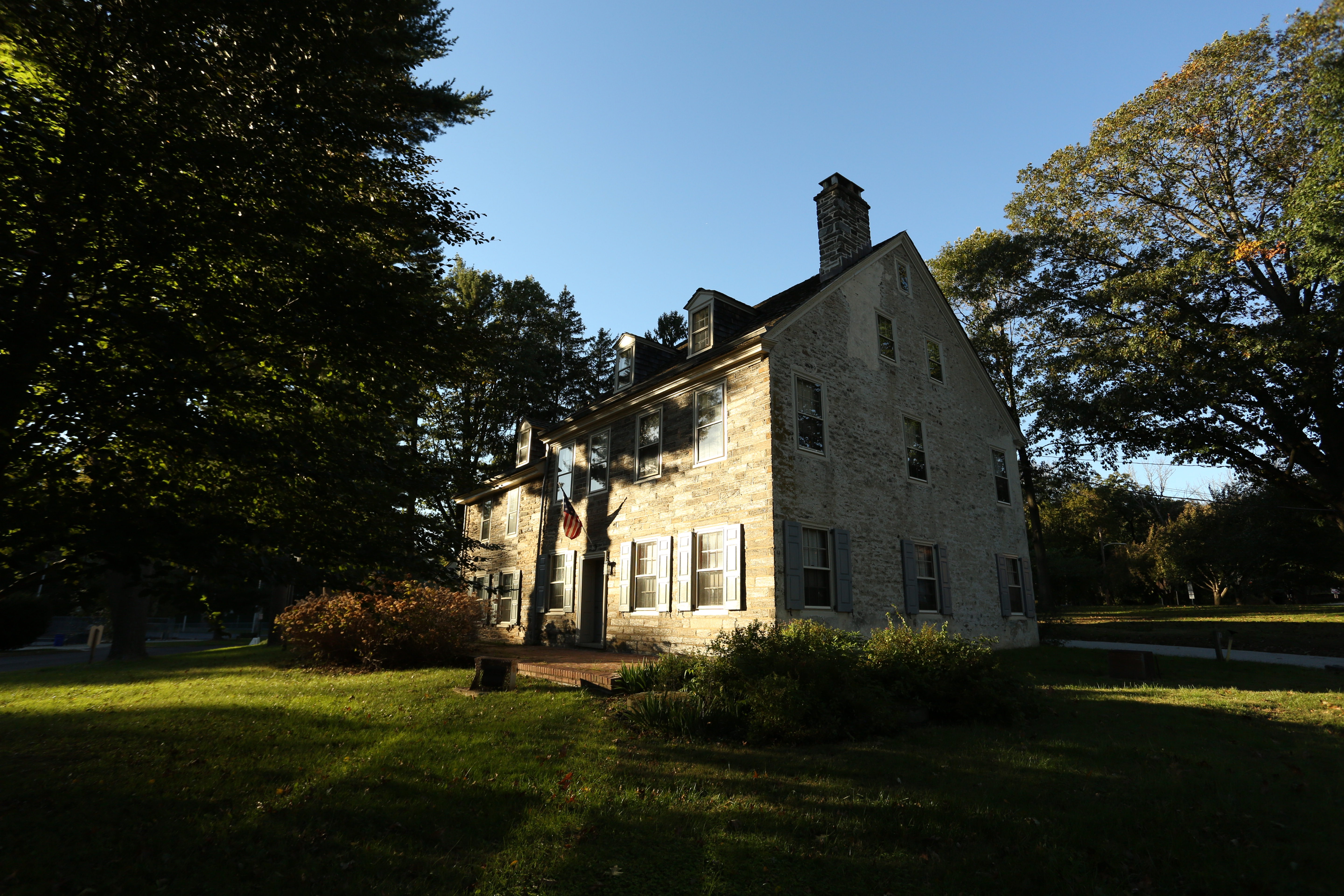
- Richard Wall house in October 2018

- Location within Philadelphia
- Location: Wall Park Drive, Elkins Park, Pennsylvania, U.S.
- Coordinates: 40°4′42″N 75°7′44″W
- Area: 1 acre (0.40 ha)
- Built: 1682
- NRHP reference No.: 79002302

Significant dates
- Added to NRHP: June 28, 1979
- Designated PHMC: November 21, 1982

The Richard Wall house is a historic home in Elkins Park, Pennsylvania, built in 1682. It was owned by the Wall family for 165 years, and was in continuous occupancy from its construction until 1979. It is listed in the National Register of Historic Places as Wall House and is also sometimes referred to as The Ivy.

The home has undergone several renovations, and a section of the basement wall is the only original remaining construction. It was the site of religious meetings and weddings, and among the earliest locations of Quaker worship in the United States. It is now a museum open to the public, and is located at Church Road and Wall Park Drive in Elkins Park.

== History ==
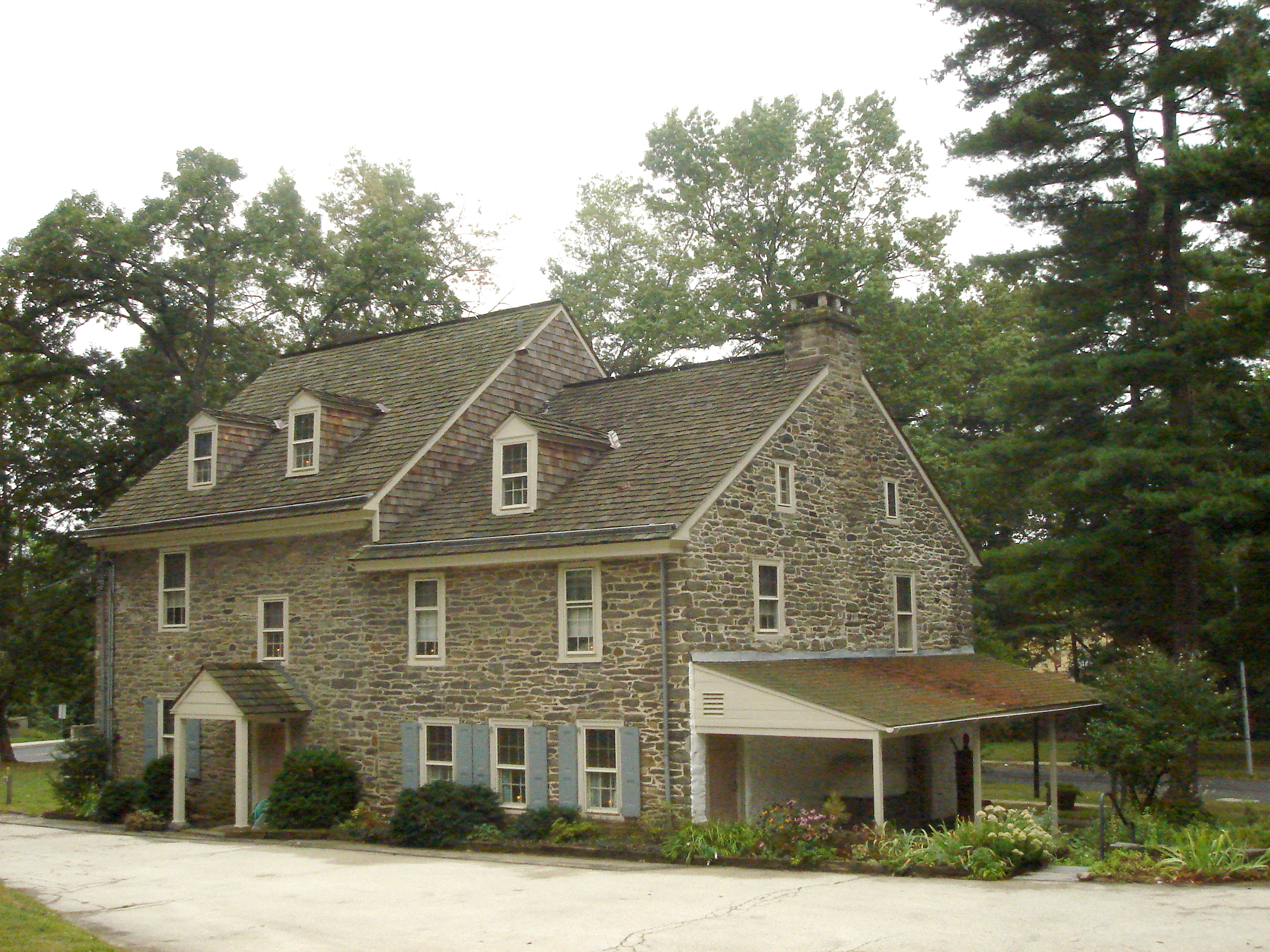
The Wall House from the rear

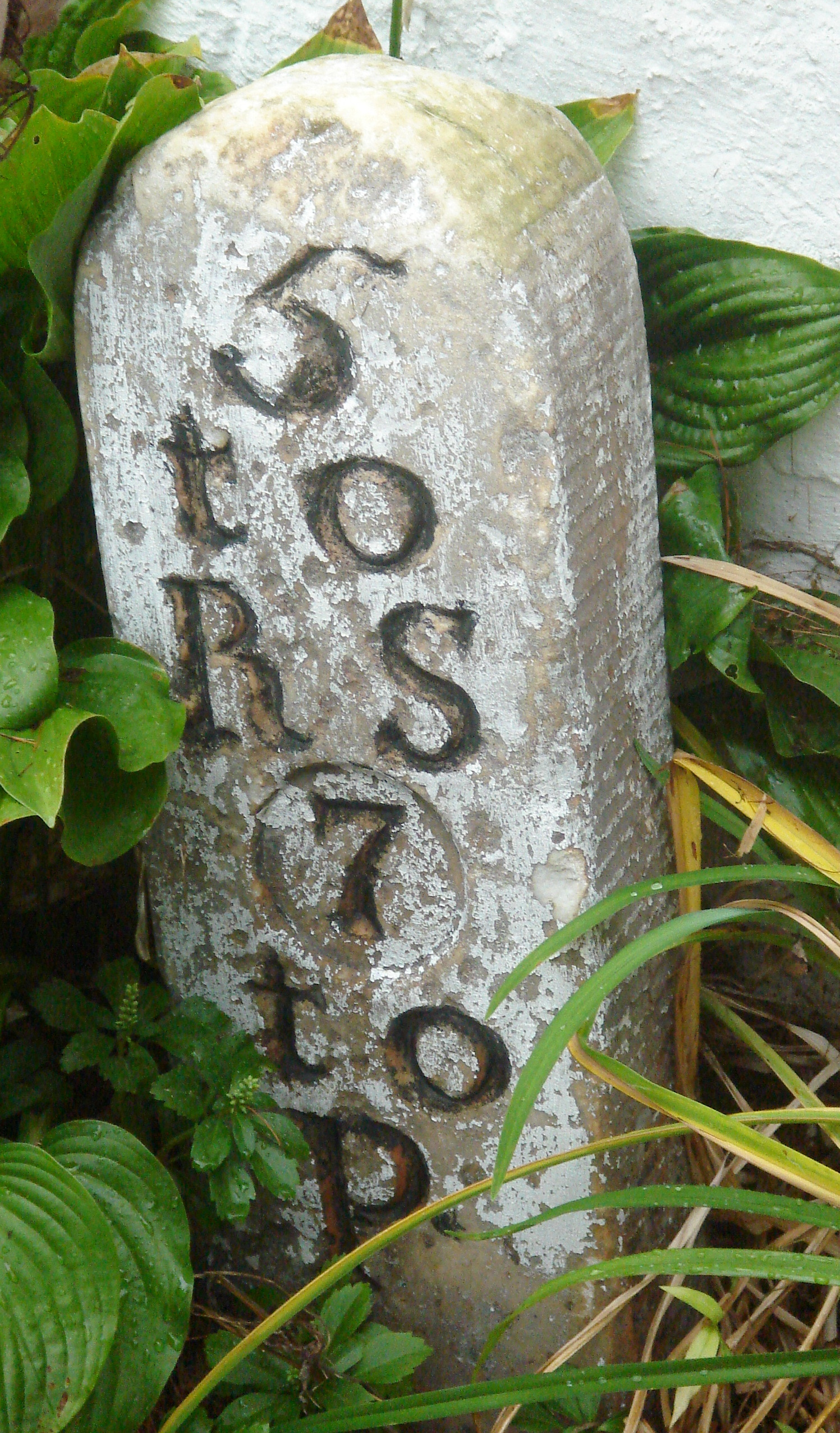
A mile marker on the Wall House grounds

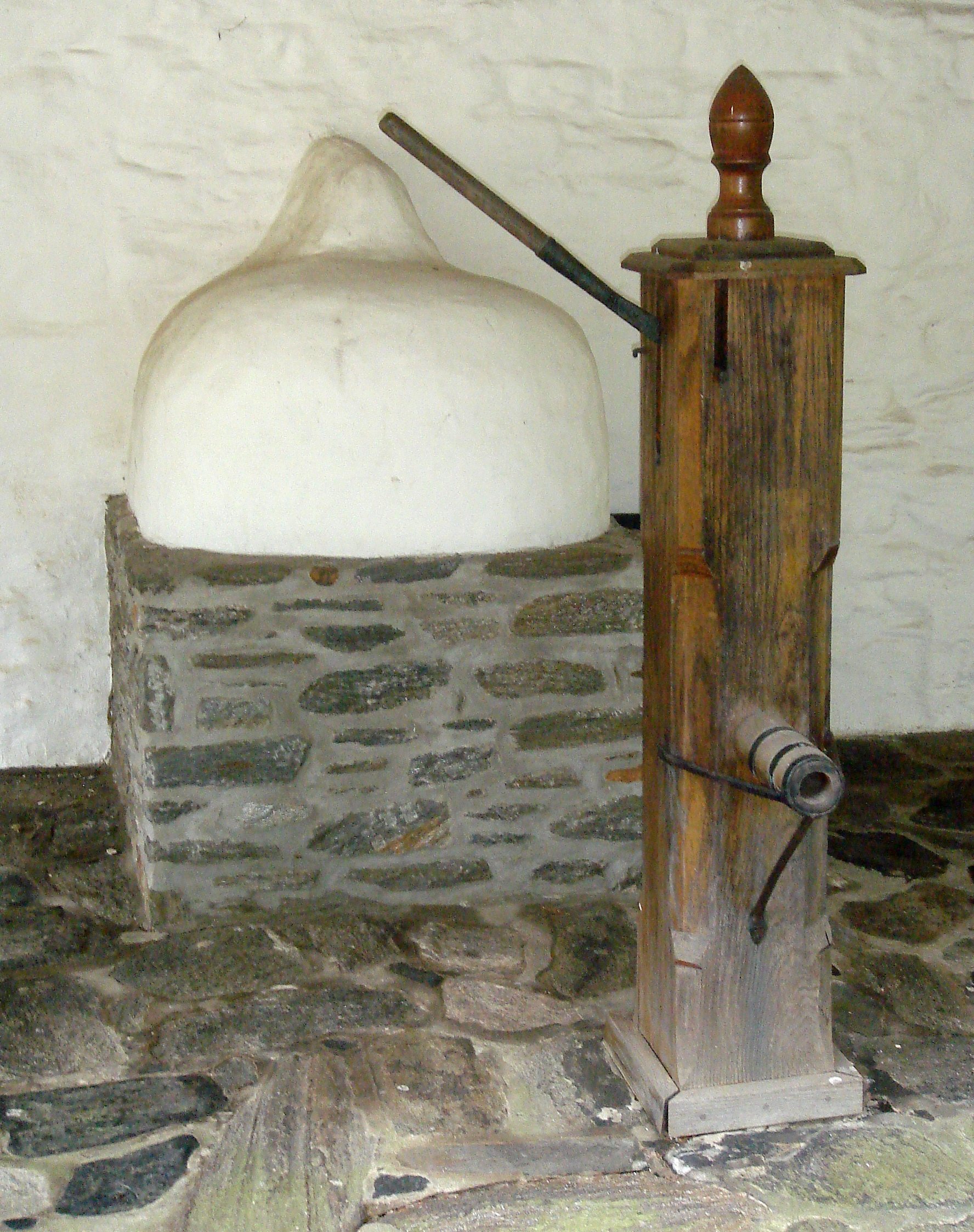
A beehive oven and a water pump on the side porch of the Wall House

Richard Wall was one of the fifteen original founders of Cheltenham Township, Pennsylvania, likely arriving with William Penn's group of Quakers in 1682. They named the township for the main town in Gloucestershire, England, where they originated.

In 1692, the house was first constructed as a log cabin in the wilderness, with a stone fireplace wall, the masonry that can still be seen in the present construction. The Walls made renovations from around 1730 to 1805, many probably due to the growth of the Wall family.

The Wall family was joined in marriage by the Shoemaker family. The families owned a corn grist mill on Tacony Creek. Descendants of the Walls lived in the house until 1847, when it was sold to the Bosler family.

In 1927, running water and electricity were added. The Bosler family remained the owners until 1932, when the property was purchased by the township and named Wall Park. The house was rented from 1932 to 1979. In 1941, Harold C. Pike, the township manager, moved into the home and resided there until his death in 1978.

Since 1980, the house has been managed by the Cheltenham Township Historical Commission, which opened the museum and orientation center in 1994.

The permanent exhibits display elements of life over more than 200 years of residence. Highlights include a fully furnished and electrified 5-foot-tall (1.5 m) doll house created before 1920 and a collection of over 100 antique tools.

== See also ==
- List of the oldest buildings in Pennsylvania
- List of the oldest buildings in the United States
