= Worton =

Worton may refer to:

== People ==
- Alf Worton (1914-2000), English footballer
- Dan Worton (born 1972), English musician
- Harry Worton (1921-2002), Canadian politician
- Michael Worton (born 1951), Scottish academic based at University College London
- Ronald Worton (born 1942), Canadian doctor
- William A. Worton (1897-1973), American police chief

== Places ==
United Kingdom

- Worton, North Yorkshire
- Worton, Oxfordshire (disambiguation)
- Worton, Wiltshire

United States

- Worton, Maryland
