= Worton, Oxfordshire =

Worton, Oxfordshire may refer to:

- Worton (civil parish), Oxfordshire, containing the villages of Nether Worton and Over Worton,
- Worton (hamlet), Oxfordshire, in Cassington civil parish
