= Wharton =

Wharton may refer to:

== Education ==
- Wharton School of the University of Pennsylvania, in Philadelphia, Pennsylvania, United States
- Wharton County Junior College, in Wharton, Texas, United States
- Paul R. Wharton High School, in Tampa, Florida, United States
- Wharton Center for Performing Arts, at Michigan State University in East Lansing, Michigan, United States

== Places ==
=== Antarctica ===
- Mount Wharton

=== Australia ===
- Wharton, Western Australia, a town in the Shire of Esperance

=== England ===
- Wharton, Cheshire
- Wharton, Cumbria

=== United States ===
- Wharton, New Jersey
- Wharton, Ohio
- Wharton, Texas
- Wharton, West Virginia
- Wharton Township, Fayette County, Pennsylvania
- Wharton Township, Potter County, Pennsylvania
- Wharton Creek, a stream in New York State
- Wharton State Forest, New Jersey

=== Other ===
- Wharton Basin, the north-eastern part of the Indian Ocean

== People ==
- Wharton (name), including a list of people with the name

== See also ==
- Warton (disambiguation)
