= Wharton (name) =

Notable people named Wharton include:

== Politicians and diplomats ==
- A C Wharton (born 1944), former Mayor of Memphis, Tennessee
- Clifton Reginald Wharton, Sr. (1899–1990), American diplomat
- Clifton R. Wharton, Jr. (1926–2024), United States Deputy Secretary of State
- James Wharton (born 1984), British politician, ex member of parliament and minister
- Jeff Wharton, Canadian provincial politician from Manitoba
- John Austin Wharton (1806–1838), soldier and statesman in the Republic of Texas
- John Wharton (fl. 1407–1420), MP for Guildford
- John Wharton (MP for Beverley) (1765–1843)
- John Lloyd Wharton (1837–1912), British Member of Parliament for Durham, 1871–1874, and Ripon, 1886–1906
- Robert Wharton (Philadelphia) (1757–1834), Mayor of Philadelphia
- Thomas Wharton Jr. (1735–1778), Governor of Pennsylvania
- Thomas Wharton, 1st Marquess of Wharton and Malmesbury (1648–1715), English Whig politician, Lord Lieutenant of Ireland
- Trey Wharton (born 1966), Texas politician
- William H. Wharton (1802–1839), Republic of Texas politician

== Sportspeople ==
- Adam Wharton (born 2004), English footballer
- Alan Wharton (1923–1993), English cricketer
- Albert Buckman Wharton, Jr. (a.k.a. Buster Wharton) (1909–1963), American rancher and polo player
- Andy Wharton (1961–2025), English footballer
- Arthur Wharton (1865–1930), Ghanaian-born footballer who played in England
- Ben Wharton (born 1990), English footballer
- Jackie Wharton (1920–2007), English footballer
- Ken Wharton (1916–1957), Formula One racing driver
- Kenny Wharton (born 1960), English footballer
- Louis Wharton (1896–1957), West Indian-born English cricketer
- Shonica Wharton (born 1996), Barbadian netball player
- Terry Wharton (1942–2026), English footballer
- Tershawn Wharton (born 1998), American football player
- Wharton Davies (1874–1961), Welsh rugby union and rugby league footballer

== Other people ==
- Albert Buckman Wharton III, American rancher
- Anne Wharton (1659–1685), English poet and playwright
- Edith Wharton (1862–1937), American novelist, short story writer, and designer
- Gabriel C. Wharton (1824–1906), Confederate general in the American Civil War
- Gabriel Caldwell Wharton (1839–1887), Union lieutenant colonel in the American Civil War
- George Wharton, (1618–1681), English pamphleteer and astrologer
- Gordon Wharton, (1929–2011), English poet
- Henry Wharton (writer) (1664–1695), English writer
- Henry Wharton (soldier) (died 1689), English soldier who served in Ireland
- James Wharton (racing driver) (born 2006), Australian racing driver
- John A. Wharton (1828–1865), Confederate general during the American Civil War
- John F. Wharton (lawyer) (1894–1977), American entertainment lawyer
- John F. Wharton (general) (born 1957), United States Army general
- Joseph Wharton (1826–1909), prominent Philadelphia merchant, industrialist and philanthropist
- Joseph John Cheyne Wharton, (1859–1923), journalist in South Australia and New South Wales
- Michael Wharton (1913–2006), British newspaper columnist who wrote under the pseudonym Peter Simple
- Morton Bryan Wharton (1839–1908), American pastor and author
- Philip Wharton, 4th Baron Wharton (1613–1696), English peer and Parliamentarian during the English Civil War
- Philip Wharton, 1st Duke of Wharton (1698–1731), powerful Jacobite politician, notorious libertine and rake
- Steve Wharton, British academic
- Thomas Wharton, 1st Baron Wharton (1495–1568), English nobleman
- Thomas Wharton, 2nd Baron Wharton (1520–1572), English nobleman
- Thomas Wharton, 1st Marquess of Wharton (1648–1715), English nobleman and politician, credited with being the lyricist of Lilliburlero
- Thomas Wharton Jr. (1735–1778), American politician and 1st President of Pennsylvania
- Thomas Wharton (anatomist) (1614–1673), English anatomist
- Thomas Wharton (author) (born 1963), Canadian novelist
- Thomas Kelah Wharton (1814–1862), English artist and architect
- Tiny Wharton (1927–2005), Scottish soccer referee
- William Wharton (author) (1925–2008), American novelist
- William Wharton (hydrographer) (1843–1905), British admiral and hydrographer
- Baron Wharton, a title of English nobility
