= Warton (surname) =

Warton is a surname. Notable people with the name include:

- Brett Warton (born 1975) Australian former professional rugby league footballer
- Charles Warton (1832–1900) British and Australian politician
- Dan Warton (born 1972) English drummer
- Joseph Warton (1722–1800) English literary critic
- Michael Warton (died 1645) (1593–1645), English politician
- Robert Warton (umpire) (1847–1923), English cricket umpire
- Robert Parfew, also known as Robert Warton, (died 1557), English Benedictine abbot
- Thomas Warton (1728–1790) English literary historian and Poet Laureate
- Thomas Warton the elder (c. 1688 – 1745), English clergyman and schoolmaster
