= William McIntire Elkins =

American collector (1882-1947)

William McIntyre Elkins (1882–1947) was an American collector of rare books and Dickensiana.

== Early life ==
He was born September 3, 1882, in Philadelphia into the wealthy Elkins family. He was the son of George W. Elkins and grandson of William Lukens Elkins of Pennsylvania who made his fortune in oil and gasoline. William M. Elkins attended Harvard University, graduating in 1905. He spent much time in his early days with his cousin, Harry Elkins Widener, who was lost in the Titanic disaster in 1912.

== Later life ==
After university Elkins became an investment banker in 1906 and was a member of both the New York and Philadelphia Stock Exchanges. He founded his own investment company in 1911. He was a member of the board of trustees of the Penn Mutual Life Insurance Company, as well as a director of the Land Title Bank and Trust Company. He also engaged with local civic institutions such as the Philadelphia Museum and School of Industrial Art and the library of Philadelphia. He was elected chairman of the board of trustees of the Pennsylvania Museum of Art in Philadelphia in 1933 He also acted as director of the Pennroad Corporation, affiliated with the Pennsylvania Railroad Company from 1932.

== Book collector ==
From his early days at Harvard he purchased books from rare book sellers. He eventually specialized in two areas: early Americana and the works of Charles Dickens. He collected not only rare editions of Dickens's books, many in their original publications as periodical series, but also various ephemera such as speeches, addresses, original illustrations, mementos, and letters. Elkins also owned a desk that Dickens used, along with his postal scale and pen tray, his pocket compass, travelling lantern, and a bedside candlestick. In terms of rarity, the collection contains the Pickwick Papers in parts, of which Dickens inscribed the first fourteen to his young sister-in-law, Mary Hogarth.

Elkins seated at the Dickens desk

He was active in The Book Table Club, a group founded in 1931 by New York antiquarian booksellers. In 1935 Elkins had printed a small publication in cooperation with A. Edward Newton called "Eddie Newton's Ride, or the Diverting History of A. Edward," whose proceeds were given to The Book Table Club.

== Death and legacy ==
He died on June 5, 1947, at his home, Briar Hill, in Whitemarsh, Pennsylvania, which he had had built by the architect Horace Trumbauer. He bequeathed his entire rare book collection to the Free Library of Philadelphia. When it came time to transfer the collection, his heirs requested that the library room and all of its furnishings also be transferred, so the room with the collection was re-created in a space in the library.

== Bibliographies and lists ==
- The Collections of William M. Elkins in the Free Library of Philadelphia: A Brief Description. Philadelphia: The Free Library, 1949.
- Shaffer, Ellen, and Howell J. Heaney. Portrait of a Philadelphia Collector, William Mcintire Elkins (1882–1947): With a Check-List of the Elkins Americans, 1493–1869, Now in the Free Library of Philadelphia. Philadelphia: Free Library of Philadelphia, 1956.
- Elkins, William McIntire. The Life and Works of Charles Dickens, 1812-1870. An Exhibition From the Collection of William M. Elkins, of Philadelphia, Held at the Free Library, June–July, 1946. 58 p. Free Library of Philadelphia, 1946.
