= Settlement Music School =

Coordinates: 39.9375°N 75.1509°W

- Philadelphia, Pennsylvania; U.S.

Information
- Type: Music School
- Established: 1908
- Executive Director: Helen S. Eaton
- Campus: Urban
- Website: www.settlementmusic.org

Settlement Music School is a community music school with branches in and around Philadelphia.

Founded in 1908 by two young women, Jeannette Selig Frank and Blanche Wolf Kohn, it is the largest community school of the arts in the United States. Its five branches are in South, West and Northeast Philadelphia, Germantown, and Willow Grove, Pennsylvania. It is the largest employer of musicians in the region, with over 200 faculty members; since its founding, its faculty has included current and former members of the Philadelphia Orchestra. Among its alumni are Albert Einstein, Michael and Kevin Bacon, Stanley Clarke, Chubby Checker, Clamma Dale, Joey DeFrancesco, Kevin Eubanks, Christian McBride, Questlove, former Philadelphia Mayor Frank Rizzo, Wallace Roney, and members of many symphony orchestras across the United States and around the world.

Mary Louise Curtis Bok Zimbalist, only child of Cyrus H. K. Curtis, a wealthy magazine publisher and founder of the Curtis Publishing Company, became involved with the Settlement School at the age of 48. At the time, the school was focused on providing musical training to young immigrants. Mrs. Bok made a gift to the school of $150,000 for a Settlement Music House. The music house's goal was "Americanization among the foreign population of Philadelphia." A close friend of the Bok family, pianist Josef Hofmann, played a recital at the school's dedication. Today this facility on 416 Queen Street in Philadelphia is known as the Mary Louise Curtis Branch.
