= Mary Louise Curtis =

American arts patron (1876–1970)

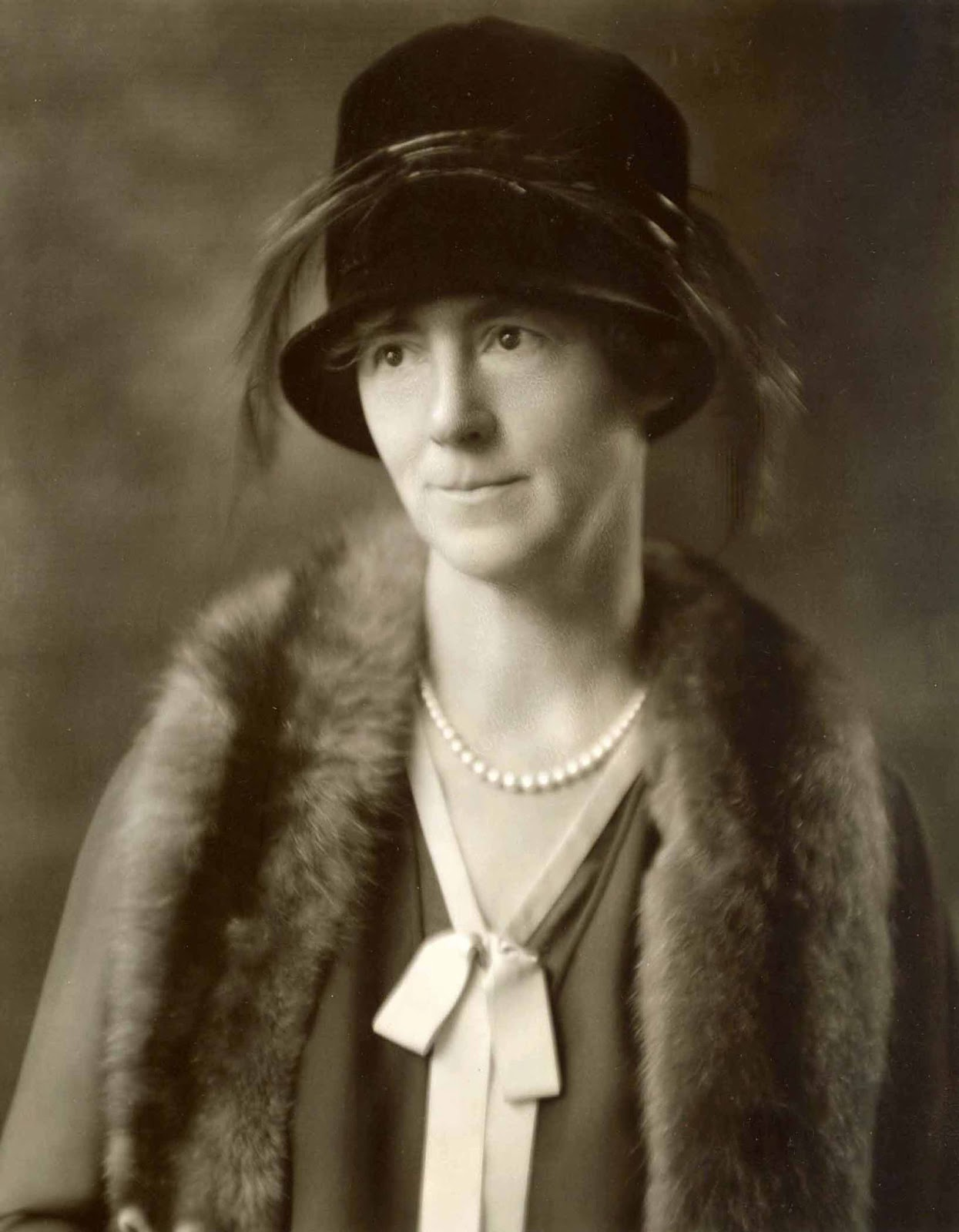
- Born: August 6, 1876; Boston, Massachusetts, U.S.
- Died: January 4, 1970 (aged 93); Philadelphia, Pennsylvania, U.S.
- Occupation: Philanthropist
- Known for: Founder of the Curtis Institute of Music
- Spouses: Edward Bok (m. 1896; died 1930) Efrem Zimbalist (m. 1943)
- Parent(s): Cyrus H. K. Curtis and Louisa Knapp Curtis

Mary Louise Curtis (August 6, 1876 – January 4, 1970) was the founder of the Curtis Institute of Music in Philadelphia. She was the only child of the magazine and newspaper magnate Cyrus H. K. Curtis and Louisa Knapp Curtis, the founder and editor of the Ladies' Home Journal.

She has also been credited with funding many of the landscape improvements made to the inner waterfront of the Camden, Maine village harbor during the early to mid-20th century.

== Early life and first marriage ==
Aged 13, writing under her mother's maiden name (as Mary L. Knapp), she was one of sixteen people on the staff of Ladies' Home Journal in 1890, the first year of Edward W. Bok's long tenure as editor of the magazine. In 1896, at the age of nineteen, she married Bok, who was fourteen years her senior. The couple had two sons, William Curtis Bok and Cary William Bok.

Her husband retired from the magazine in 1919, and they spent their winters in Florida, where they built the Bok Tower Gardens near Lake Wales. The marriage of Mary Louise and Edward Bok lasted 34 years until his death in 1930.

== Settlement Music School ==
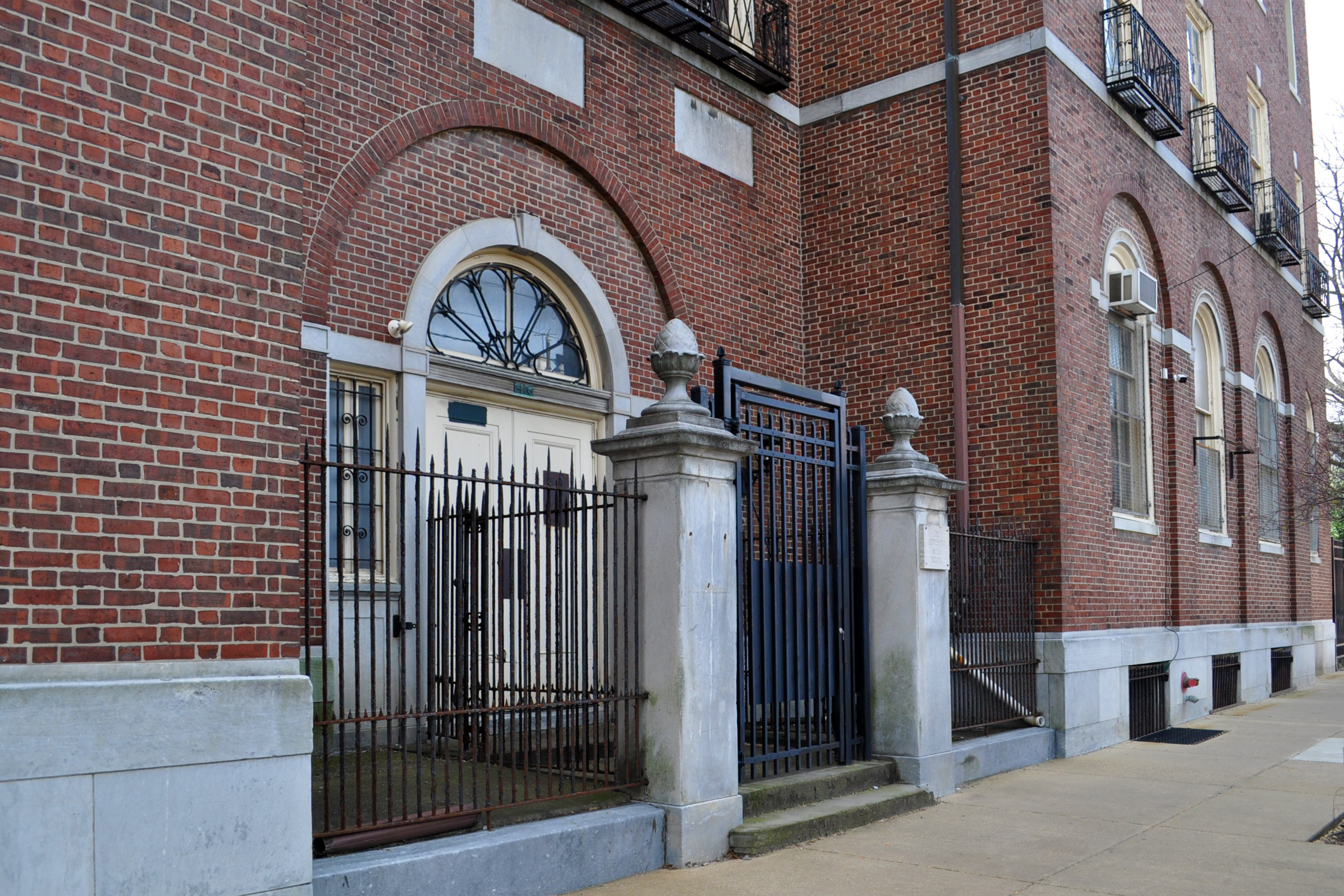
Mary Louise Curtis Branch, Settlement Music School, 416 Queen St., Philadelphia.

She became involved with the Settlement Music School at the age of 48. At the time, the school was focused on providing musical training to young immigrants. In 1917, she made a gift to the school of $150,000 for a Settlement Music House. The music house's goal was "Americanization among the foreign population of Philadelphia." A close friend of the Bok family, pianist Josef Hofmann, played a recital at the school's dedication. Today, this facility on Queen Street in Philadelphia is known as the Mary Louise Curtis Branch.

== Curtis Institute of Music ==
In 1924, she established the Curtis Institute of Music, which she named in honor of her father, who also had a great interest in music. After consulting with musician friends, including Josef Hofmann and Leopold Stokowski, on how best to help musically gifted young people, Mrs. Bok purchased three mansions on Philadelphia's Rittenhouse Square and had them joined and renovated. She established a faculty of prominent performing artists and made several gifts to the institute, eventually leaving it with an endowment of $12 million.

She was the chief beneficiary of her father's estate, inheriting assets estimated at $18 to 20 million when he died in 1933. At this time, she became the largest shareholder, director and a vice president of Curtis Publishing. She founded the Curtis Hall Arboretum at the family residence in Wyncote, Pennsylvania.

It was revealed on March 13, 1958, that she had been awarded the Philadelphia Art Alliance's Medal of Achievement for "advancement of or outstanding achievement in the arts." Alliance president Laurence H. Eldredge made the announcement at the organization's annual dinner.

== The Research Studio and other philanthropic efforts ==
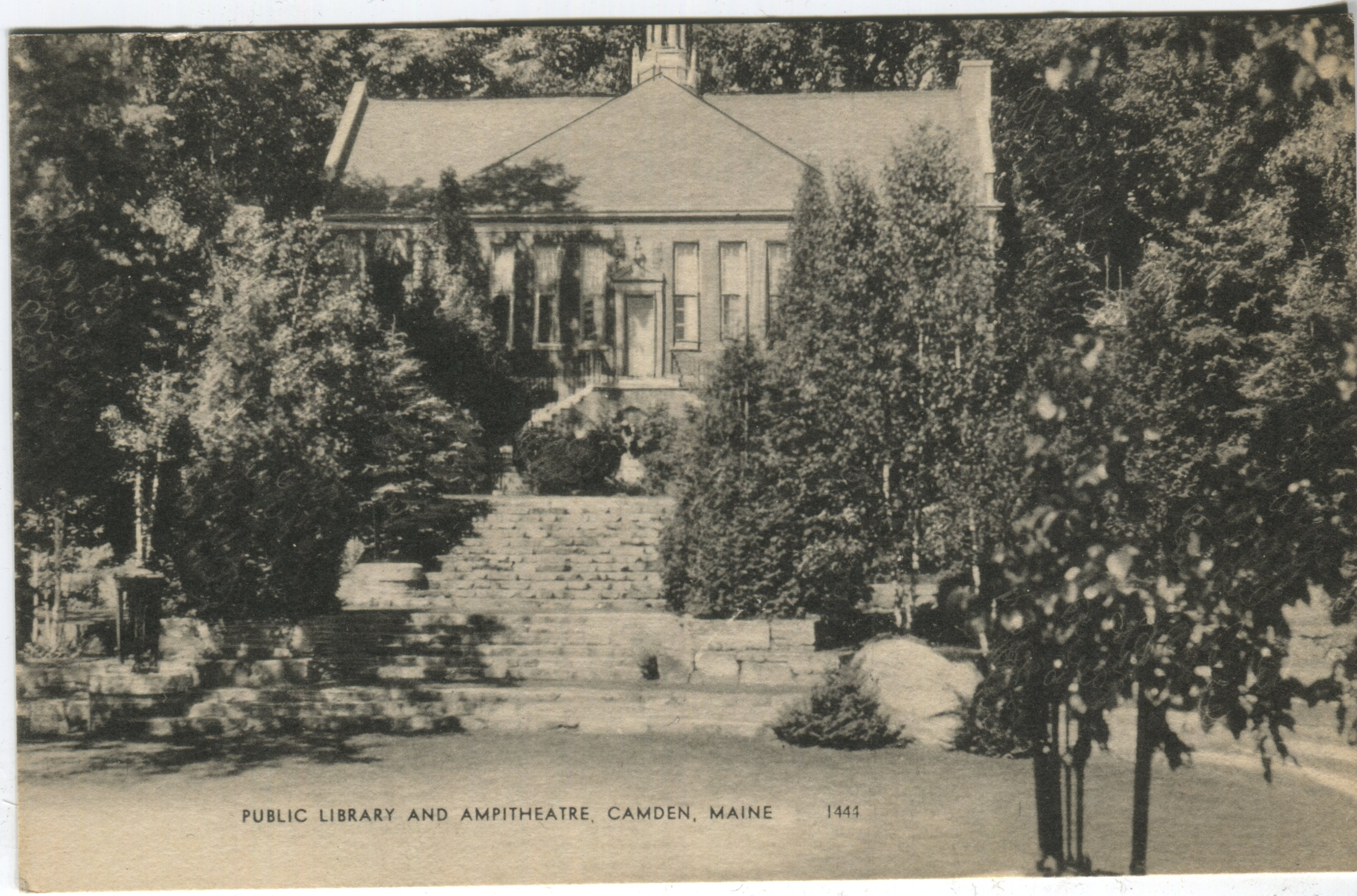
Mary Louise Curtis Bok donated the property for the Camden Public Library to the town of Camden, Maine in 1916

She gave Andre Smith sufficient patronage to enable him to establish an artist's colony known as The Research Studio (now the Maitland Art Center) in Maitland, Florida. The two met through a mutual friend, stage actress Annie Russell, with whom he had worked in summer theater in Connecticut. Mrs. Bok had already served Russell as a patron, funding the Annie Russell Theatre at Rollins College, Winter Park. Mrs. Bok, in addition to her other philanthropic pursuits, funded Smith's artist colony, which they named The Research Studio. Built between 1934 and 1937 (with additional construction in the 1940s), The Research Studio was dedicated to what Smith inscribed in one of the courtyards: "The artist's job is to explore, to announce new visions, and to open new doors."

At the time of its opening (the first artists arrived in 1938, coinciding with an inaugural exhibition in the gallery space), it was one of the few art galleries in the state of Florida. Among the nationally prominent artists who lived and worked at the studio were Milton Avery, Ralston Crawford, Ernest D. Roth, Arnold Blanch, Doris Lee, and Elizabeth Sparhawk-Jones.

She also became known for purchasing and preserving important music manuscripts in order to bring manuscripts together in the collections of academic institutions, conservatories, libraries, and state archives in order to facilitate easier use of these resources by musicians and researchers.

== Marriage to Efrem Zimbalist ==
In 1943, she married the director of the Curtis Institute, violinist Efrem Zimbalist.

== Curtis Publishing ==
Together with one of her sons, Cary, she controlled 32 percent of Curtis Publishing Company through its final turbulent years. She held a seat on the board of directors but reportedly "rarely attended board meetings during these declining years - refusing either to sell the stocks they had held all their lives or to exercise the authority that those stocks gave them." She finally did resign her seat on the board of directors in 1967, a few years before the final dissolution of Curtis Publishing and her death.
