= Louisa Knapp Curtis =

American magazine columnist and editor (1851–1910)

- Born: October 21, 1851
- Died: February 25, 1910 (aged 58)
- Resting place: Laurel Hill Cemetery, Philadelphia, Pennsylvania, U.S.
- Occupation(s): Columnist, editor
- Spouse: Cyrus H. K. Curtis
- Children: Mary Louise Curtis

Louisa Knapp Curtis (October 21, 1851 – February 25, 1910) (also known as Louisa Knapp) was an American columnist and the first editor of the Ladies' Home Journal from 1883 to 1889. It became one of the most popular magazines published in the United States and reached a circulation of one million within ten years. Curtis turned over the editorship to Edward Bok in 1889 but she continued to author a column and provide oversight.

She was married to Cyrus Curtis, head of the Curtis Publishing Company, and took over from her husband as the author of the women's page monthly supplement Women at Home for the Tribune and Farmer weekly newspaper.

== Early life ==
In 1875, Louisa Knapp married Cyrus Curtis when he was the publisher of The People's Ledger in Boston. They met while singing in a concert to celebrate the end of the Civil War. Louisa was working as a private secretary for Samuel Gridley Howe, a prominent Boston physician and husband of women's suffrage activist Julia Ward Howe. After a fire destroyed the Boston publishing plant for Cyrus' newspaper, they moved to Philadelphia, Pennsylvania, in 1876 and he founded the Tribune and Farmer.

== Career ==
1886 edition of Ladies' Home Journal

Cyrus was the original author of the Women and Home column in the Tribune and Farmer weekly newspaper. It was originally developed from articles clipped from other sources and surrounded by advertisements directed toward women. Louisa criticized the column to her husband since she felt it did not address the real concerns of women. She convinced her husband that she could do a better job and began to write original content directed toward women. The column proved extremely popular and soon grew to fill a full page. The Curtises decided to publish a monthly supplement that would be included in the Tribune and Farmer. The first issue of the supplement was released in December 1883 and titled Ladies' Home Journal and Practical Housekeeper. It was written by Louisa under her maiden name and published by her husband.

The supplement proved so popular that it was expanded to a magazine and Louisa became the first editor. The magazine title was shortened to Ladies' Home Journal in 1886. In July 1889, the Curtises decided to expand the magazine to a 32-page magazine with a cover. Louisa resigned as editor and Edward Bok became the new editor.

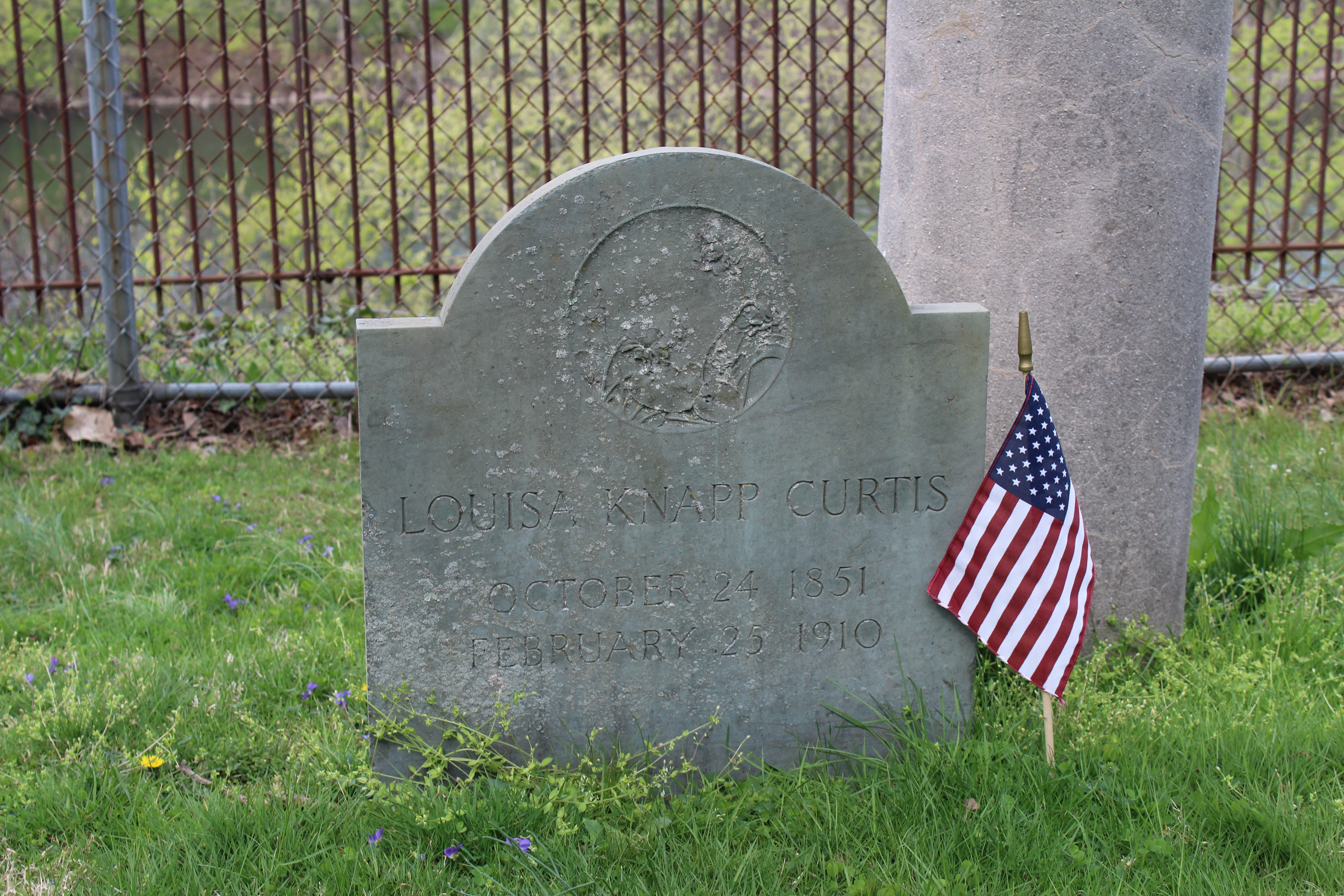
Louisa Knapp Curtis gravestone in Laurel Hill Cemetery

She died on February 25, 1910, in Cheltenham Township, Pennsylvania, and was interred at Laurel Hill Cemetery in Philadelphia.

== Family ==
Louisa and Cyrus Curtis had one child, Mary Louise Curtis, who married Edward Bok in 1896. She founded Bok Tower Gardens, the Curtis Institute of Music, the Curtis Hall Arboretum and the Curtis Center.

== Sources ==
- Damon-Moore, Helen (1994). Magazines for the Millions: Gender and Commerce in the Ladies' Home Journal and the Saturday Evening Post, 1880-1910. State University of New York Press; Albany. ISBN 0-7914-2057-4.
