= SS Edward W. Bok =

Liberty ship of WWII

History

United States
- Name: Edward W. Bok
- Namesake: Edward W. Bok
- Owner: War Shipping Administration (WSA)
- Operator: Luckenbach Steamship Co., Ltd.
- Ordered: as type (EC2-S-C1) hull, MC hull 2469
- Awarded: 23 April 1943
- Builder: St. Johns River Shipbuilding Company, Jacksonville, Florida
- Cost: $1,228,217
- Yard number: 33
- Way number: 3
- Laid down: 14 January 1944
- Launched: 12 March 1944
- Sponsored by: Mrs. H.M. Nornabell
- Completed: 27 March 1944
- Identification: Call sign: KWKD
- Fate: Laid up in the, National Defense Reserve Fleet, Wilmington, North Carolina, 19 August 1946; Sold for commercial use, 4 January 1947, removed from fleet, 16 January 1947

Italy
- Name: Paolina
- Owner: Imprese Nav. Commerciale
- Fate: Sold, 1959

Italy
- Name: Nando
- Owner: Navigazione San Giorgio
- Fate: Sold, 1960

Panama
- Name: Kim
- Owner: General Navigation, SA
- Operator: Agemar, SA
- Fate: Sold, 1965

Panama
- Name: Sun
- Owner: Sun Navigation Co
- Operator: L. Ottaviani
- Fate: Scrapped, 1970

General characteristics
- Class & type: Liberty ship; type EC2-S-C1, standard
- Tonnage: 10,865 LT DWT; 7,176 GRT
- Displacement: 3,380 long tons (3,434 t) (light); 14,245 long tons (14,474 t) (max)
- Length: 441 feet 6 inches (135 m) oa; 416 feet (127 m) pp; 427 feet (130 m) lwl
- Beam: 57 feet (17 m)
- Draft: 27 ft 9.25 in (8.4646 m)
- Installed power: 2 × Oil fired 450 °F (232 °C) boilers, operating at 220 psi (1,500 kPa); 2,500 hp (1,900 kW)
- Propulsion: 1 × triple-expansion steam engine, (manufactured by General Machinery Corp., Hamilton, Ohio); 1 × screw propeller
- Speed: 11.5 knots (21.3 km/h; 13.2 mph)
- Capacity: 562,608 cubic feet (15,931 m^{3}) (grain); 499,573 cubic feet (14,146 m^{3}) (bale)
- Complement: 38–62 USMM; 21–40 USNAG
- Armament: Varied by ship; Bow-mounted 3-inch (76 mm)/50-caliber gun; Stern-mounted 4-inch (102 mm)/50-caliber gun; 2–8 × single 20-millimeter (0.79 in) Oerlikon anti-aircraft (AA) cannons and/or, 2–8 × 37-millimeter (1.46 in) M1 AA guns

SS Edward W. Bok was a Liberty ship built in the United States during World War II. She was named after Edward W. Bok, a naval constructor, Dutch-born American editor and Pulitzer Prize-winning author. He was editor of the Ladies' Home Journal for 30 years (1889–1919) and created Bok Tower Gardens in central Florida.

== Construction ==
SS Edward W. Bok was laid down on 14 January 1944, under a Maritime Commission (MARCOM) contract, MC hull 2469, by the St. Johns River Shipbuilding Company, Jacksonville, Florida. The ship was sponsored by Mrs. H.M. Nornabell, the wife of Major Henry Marshall Nornabell, the director of Bok Tower Gardens, and was launched on 12 March 1944.

== History ==
She was allocated to the Luckenbach Steamship Company, on 27 March 1944. On 18 May 1946, she was laid up in the National Defense Reserve Fleet, Wilmington, North Carolina. She was sold for commercial use, 4 January 1947, to Italy, for $544,506. She was removed from the fleet on 16 January 1947. Edward W. Bok was renamed Paolina and flagged in Italy. She was renamed Nando in 1959. In 1960, she was sold and renamed Kim and flagged in Panama. In 1965, she was sold and renamed Sun. She was scrapped in Japan, in 1970.

== Bibliography ==
- "St. John's River Shipbuilding, Jacksonville FL". www.ShipbuildingHistory.com. 16 October 2010.
- Maritime Administration. "Edward W. Bok". Ship History Database Vessel Status Card. U.S. Department of Transportation, Maritime Administration.
- Davies, James (May 2004). "Specifications (As-Built)" (PDF). p. 23.
- "SS Edward W. Bok".
