= Cyrus H. K. Curtis =

American magazine and newspaper publisher (1850-1933)

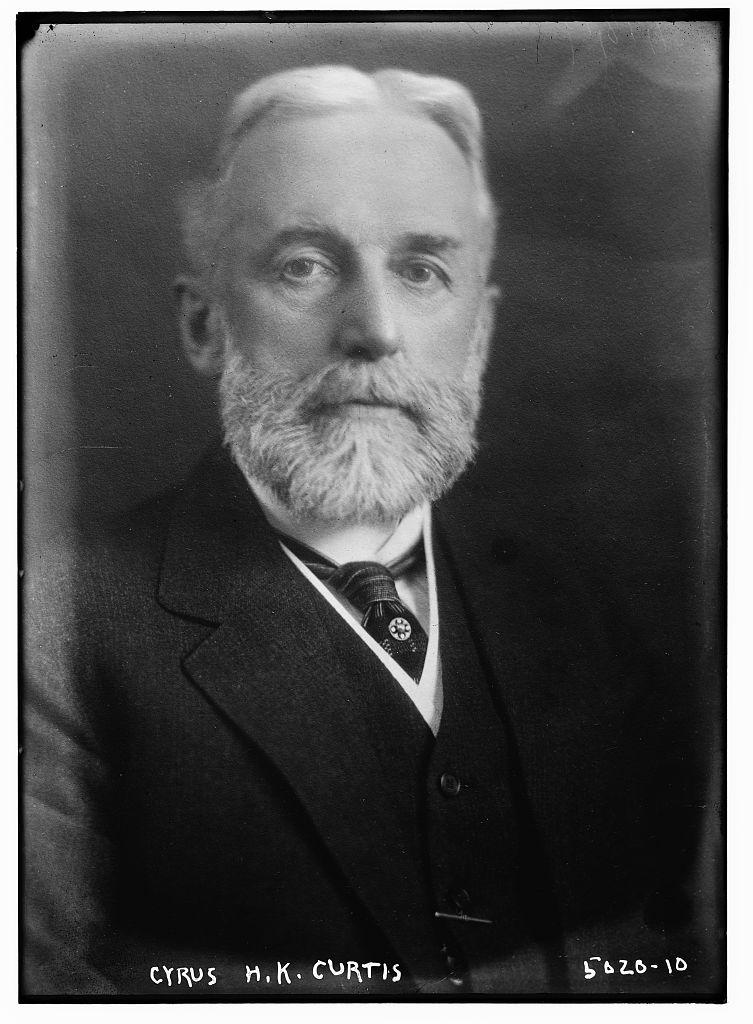
- Curtis in 1918
- Born: Cyrus Hermann Kotzschmar Curtis; June 18, 1850; Portland, Maine, U.S.
- Died: June 7, 1933 (aged 82); Wyncote, Pennsylvania, U.S.
- Resting place: West Laurel Hill Cemetery, Bala Cynwyd, Pennsylvania, U.S.
- Occupation: Publisher
- Spouse(s): Louisa Knapp (m. 1875); Kate Stanwood Cutter Pillsbury
- Children: Mary Louise Curtis Bok Zimbalist

Pennsylvania Historical Marker
- Official name: Cyrus H. K. Curtis (1850–1933)
- Type: Roadside
- Designated: November 7, 2005
- Location: 1250 W Church Rd.(SR73), Wyncote

Cyrus Hermann Kotzschmar Curtis (June 18, 1850 – June 7, 1933) was an American publisher of magazines and newspapers, including the Ladies' Home Journal and The Saturday Evening Post.

== Early life and education ==
Curtis was born in Portland, Maine. He was forced to leave high school after his first year to start working after his family lost their home in the 1866 Great Fire of Portland.

== Career ==
Curtis held a variety of newspaper and advertising jobs in Portland and Boston before starting his first publication, a weekly called the People's Ledger, in Boston in 1872.

In 1876, he moved to Philadelphia, then a major publishing center, to reduce his printing costs.

Curtis's first wife was Louisa Knapp, whom he married in 1875. In 1883, Knapp contributed a one-page supplement to the Tribune and Farmer, a magazine published by Curtis. The following year, the supplement was expanded as an independent publication with Louisa as the editor. Its original name was The Ladies Home Journal and Practical Housekeeper, but Knapp dropped the last three words in 1886, and it became Ladies Home Journal. The Ladies' Home Journal rapidly became the leading magazine of its type, reaching a circulation of one million subscriptions within ten years. It was the first American magazine to do so.

Louisa Knapp continued as editor until 1889, when she was succeeded by Edward William Bok. In 1896, Bok married Mary Louise Curtis, becoming the Curtises' son-in-law. Bok retired from the magazine in 1919, but the changes he made had vastly increased circulation. Bok introduced business practices such as: low subscription rates, inclusion of advertising to off-set costs, and reliance on popular content. This operating structure was adopted by men's magazines such as McClure's and Munsey's roughly a decade after it had become the standard practice of American women's magazines. Scholars argue that women's magazines, like the Ladies' Home Journal, pioneered these strategies "magazine revolution".

Curtis founded the Curtis Publishing Company in 1891; it would eventually publish Ladies' Home Journal, The Saturday Evening Post, Holiday, and others. A separate company founded by Curtis, Curtis-Martin Newspapers, controlled several newspapers, including for a time the Philadelphia Public Ledger, The Philadelphia Inquirer, and the New York Evening Post. Management mistakes at the newspapers led to poor financial returns, and eventually, they were sold.

While Curtis was alive, his businesses, excepting the newspapers, were successful. Ladies Home Journal was for decades the most widely circulating women's magazine in the U.S., and The Saturday Evening Post enjoyed the highest circulation of any weekly magazine in the world. In 1929, the Post and the Journal together ran fully forty percent of all US magazine advertising. One source lists Curtis as the 51st richest person ever, with a fortune of $43.2 billion adjusted for inflation (to 2008 dollars), which according to this source made him richer than J. P. Morgan.

Curtis built Lyndon, a Renaissance revival estate in Wyncote, Pennsylvania, with landscaping designed by Frederick Law Olmsted. Two of Curtis's yachts, built 1907 and 1920, were named Lyndonia.

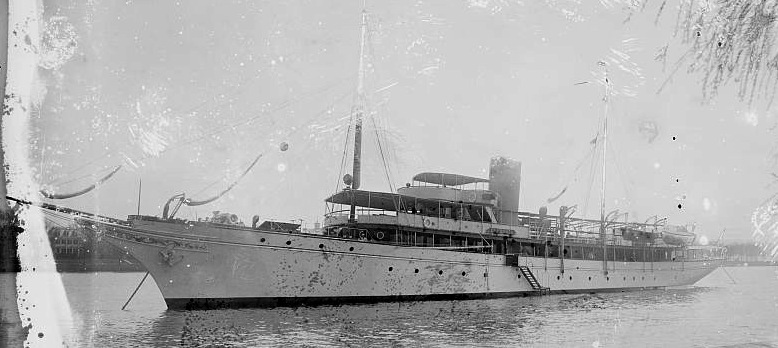
Second Lyndonia photographed March 27, 1925

Curtis was more than an occasional sailor, however, noting in a 1922 New York Times interview, "Yachting is not a hobby with me. It is a necessity. I spend half my time on this ship," and further noting that most of his meetings with staff or board members were held in the second Lyndonia's dining room. Curtis had three large yachts built at Charles L. Seabury Co.: the 115-foot Machigonne in 1904; (Note: Not to be confused with the Machigonne built by the same builder in 1909 for William L. Douglas and later USS Machigonne (SP 507).) the 163-foot Lyndonia in 1907; and the 228-foot Lyndonia in 1920. (Note: Both yachts named Lyndonia saw later service. Lyndonia of 1907 as the World War I Vega (SP 734) and Lyndonia of 1920 as Pan American World Airways' Southern Seas until it was commandeered by the US armed services for use in the Pacific theater during World War II.) Curtis was a founding member of the Camden Yacht Club in Camden, Maine, and its Commodore from 1909 to 1933, later donating the club's facilities to the town.

In the summer of 1932, Curtis suffered a heart attack while aboard his yacht, the second Lyndonia. While he was recuperating at Jefferson Hospital in Philadelphia, his second wife, Kate Stanwood Cutter Pillsbury Curtis, died suddenly. Curtis then remained in frail health until his death on June 7, 1933, at age 82, and he was interred at West Laurel Hill Cemetery in Bala Cynwyd, Pennsylvania.

Soon after his death, most of the buildings on Curtis's estate were demolished, and his daughter founded the Curtis Arboretum on the site. After the Curtis Publishing Company moved to Indianapolis, Indiana, in 1982, the company's former headquarters on Independence Square in downtown Philadelphia became the Curtis Center, home to a conference center, offices, a health club, retail shops, and restaurants.

Before his death, Curtis was elected to the American Philosophical Society (1933). He was among the first ten inductees in the American Advertising Federation's Advertising Hall of Fame (1999).

== Philanthropy ==
Cyrus Curtis remains #20 on the list of the richest Americans ever. He was known for his philanthropy to hospitals, museums, universities, and schools. He donated $2 million to the Franklin Institute; $1.25 million to the Drexel Institute of Technology for the construction of Curtis Hall; and $1 million to the University of Pennsylvania. He also purchased a pipe organ manufactured by the Austin Organ Company that had been displayed at the Philadelphia Sesquicentennial Exposition of 1926 and donated it to the University of Pennsylvania. It was incorporated into Irvine Auditorium when the building was constructed and is known to this day as the Curtis Organ, one of the largest pipe organs in the world. (The largest working organ resides in Philadelphia's John Wanamaker Building, only twenty blocks east of Irvine Auditorium, and the largest in the world, though it isn't currently working, is in the Atlantic City Convention Center, some 60 miles east.) Curtis donated pipe organs to many institutions in Philadelphia and on the day of his funeral, all of those organs were played in his honor.

In memory of his boyhood music teacher, Hermann Kotzschmar, for whom he had been named, Curtis in 1912 donated the Kotzschmar Memorial Organ to Maine's Portland City Hall Auditorium. In Thomaston, Maine, he funded the 1927–29 recreation of Montpelier, the demolished 1795 mansion of Revolutionary War general Henry Knox.

Curtis was a major organizer and backer of the Philadelphia Orchestra, founded in 1900. In its early years, he paid off its debts anonymously. Curtis's daughter, Mary Louise Curtis Bok, founded Philadelphia's Curtis Institute of Music in 1924 and dedicated it to her father.

== Gallery ==
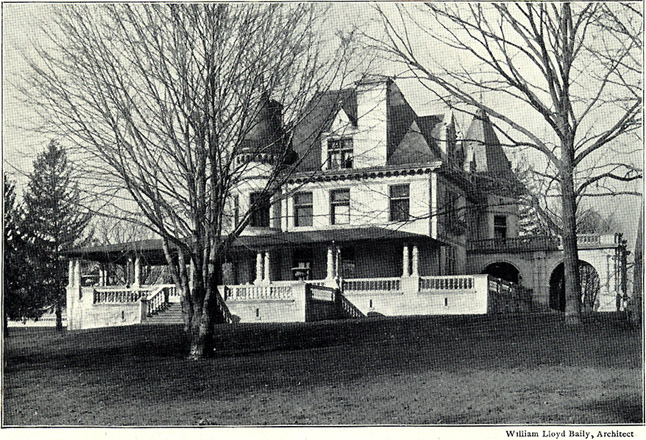
Lyndon (1895), Wyncote, PA. Demolished, except for the 1903 ballroom addition, now Curtis Hall.

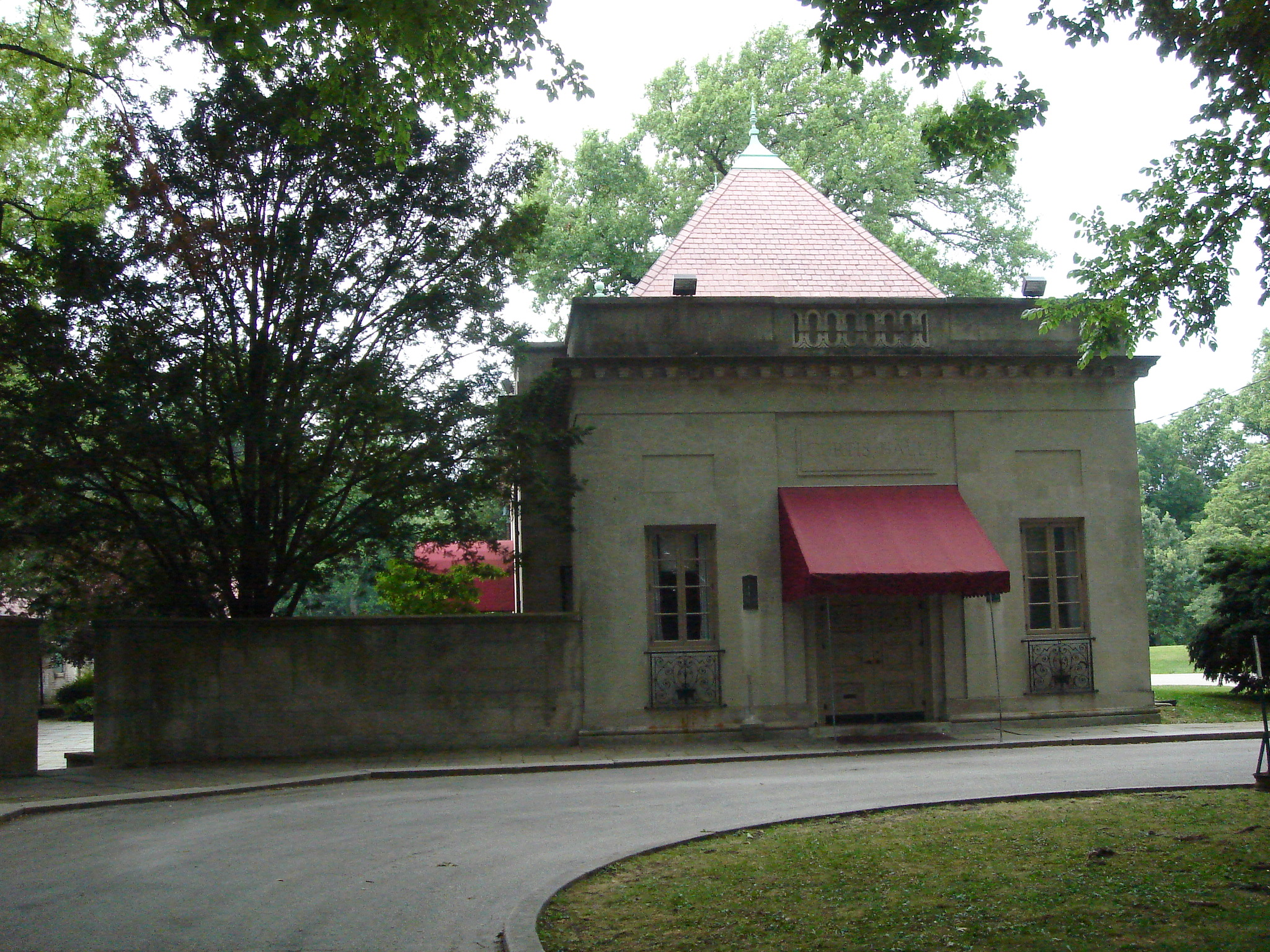
Curtis Hall (1903), Church Rd. & Greenwood Ave., Wyncote, PA.

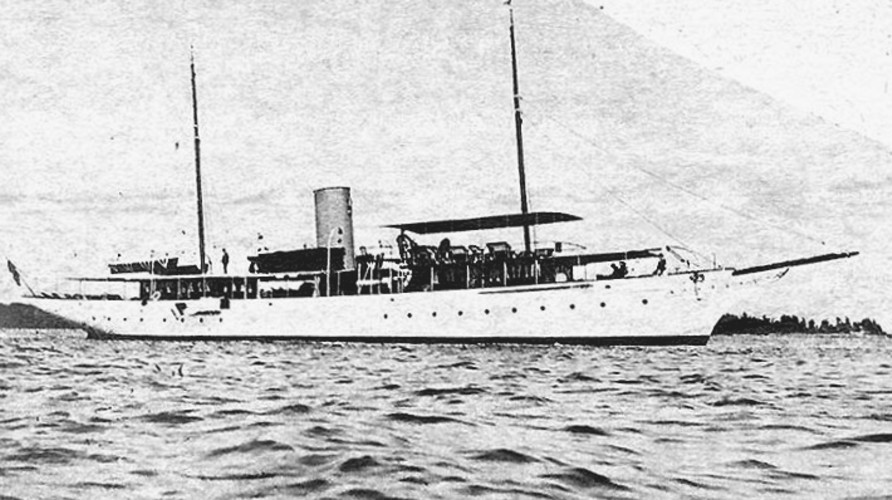
The Lyndonia (built 1907).

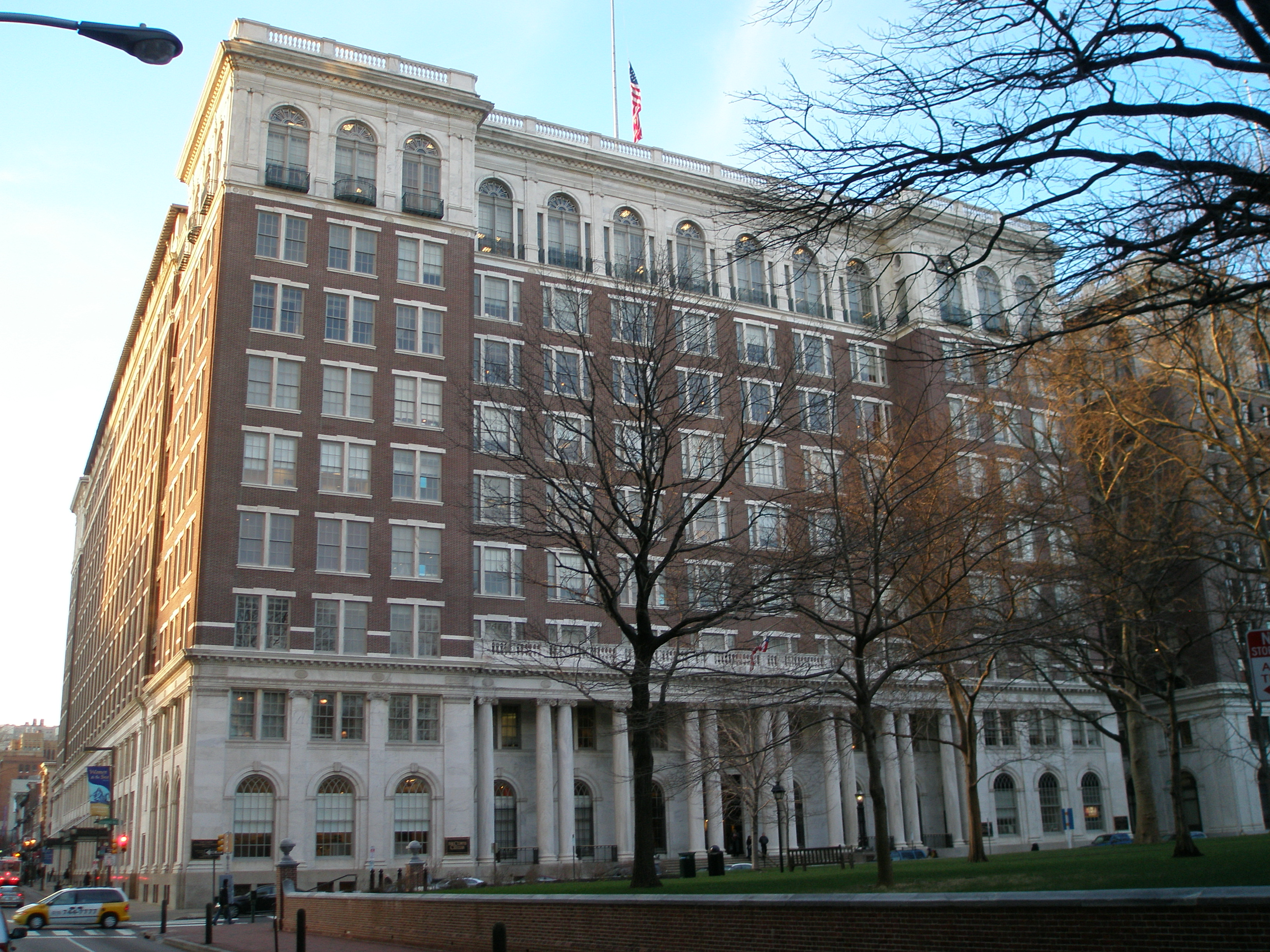
Curtis Building (1910), 6th & Walnut Sts., Philadelphia, PA.

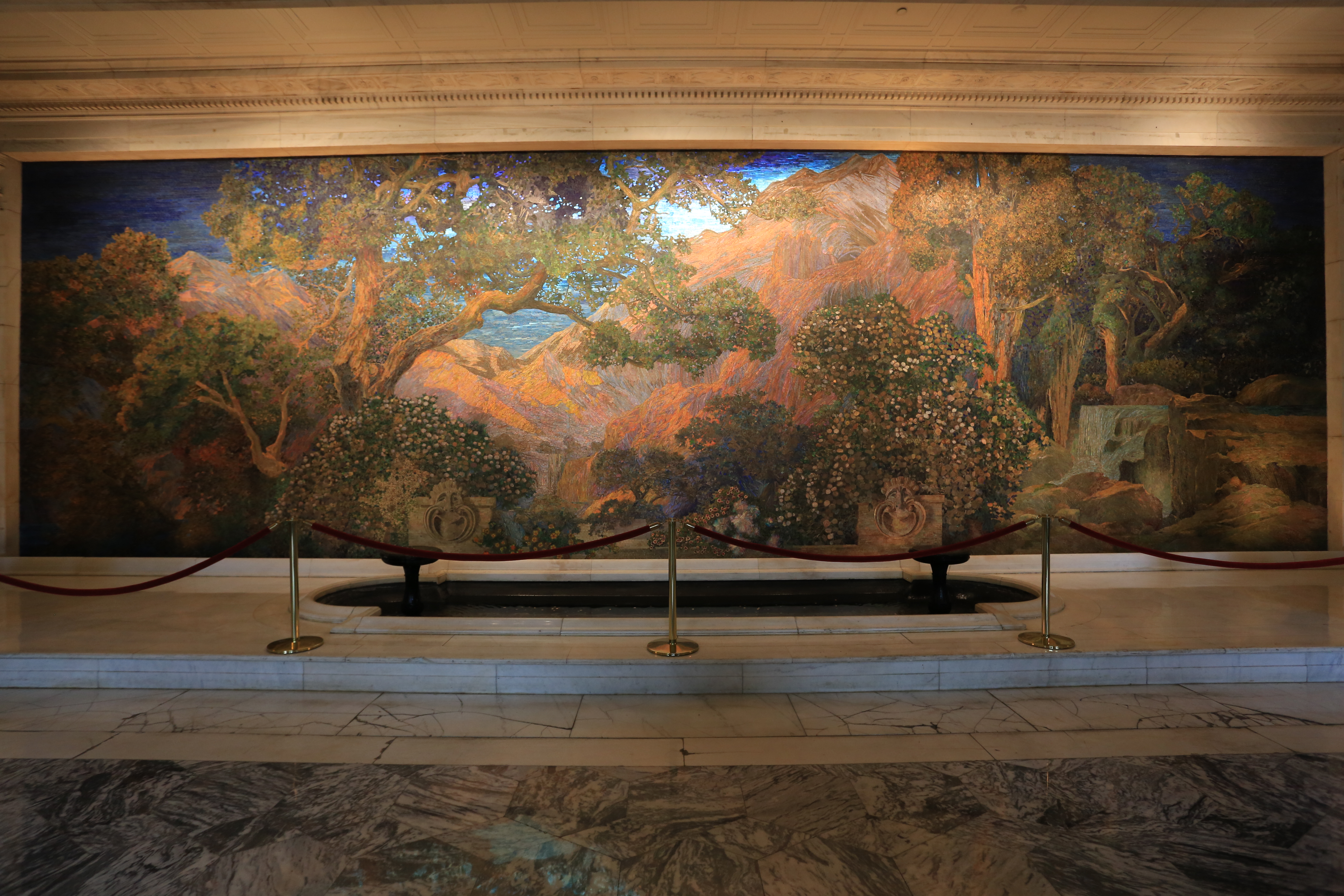
Dream Garden mosaic (1916) by Louis Comfort Tiffany and Maxfield Parrish, in the Curtis Building.

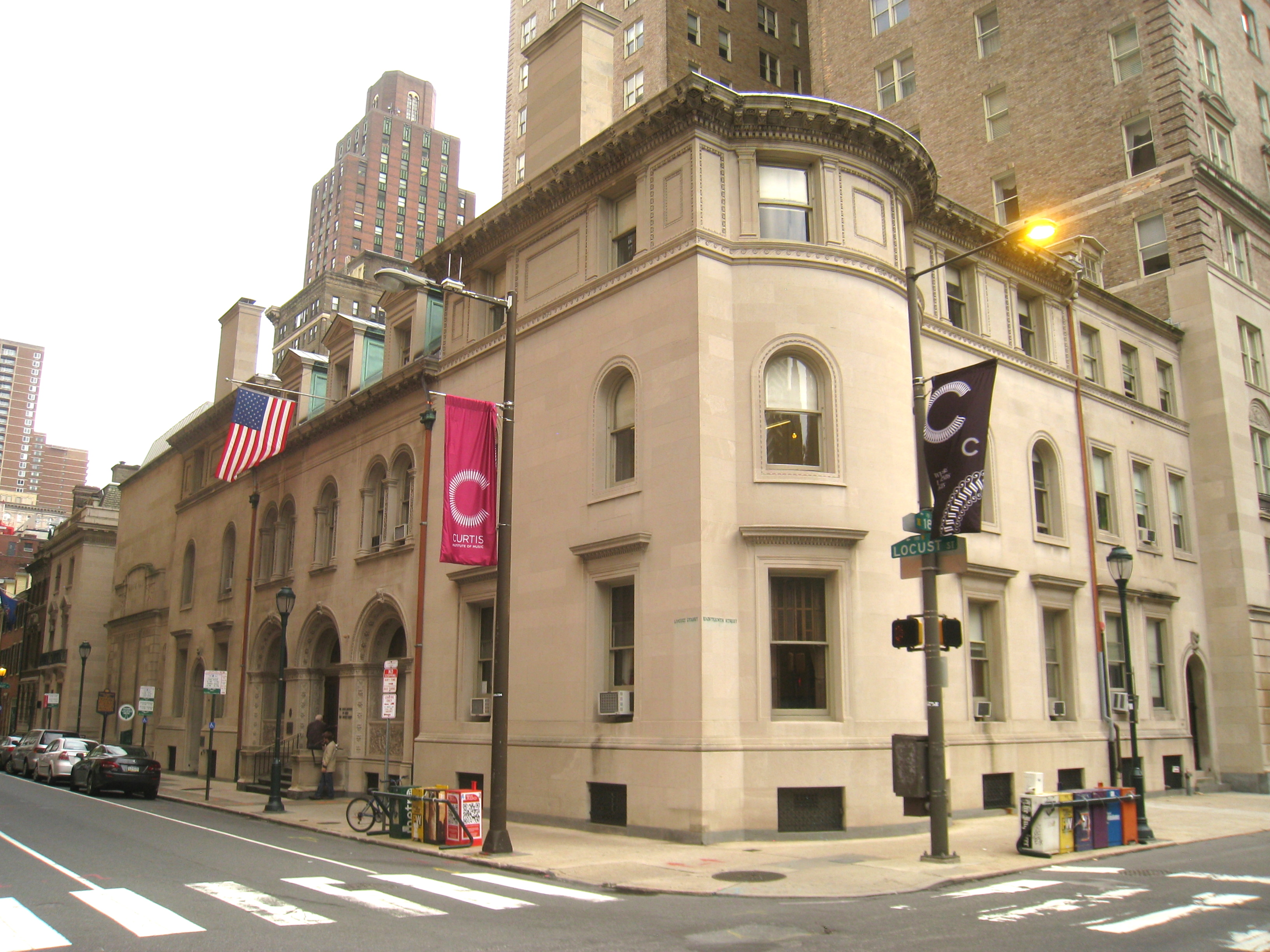
Curtis Institute of Music (est. 1924), 18th & Locust Sts., Philadelphia, PA.
