= Curtis Arboretum =

Arboretum and historic place in Wyncote, Pennsylvania, United States

- U.S. National Register of Historic Places
- Pennsylvania state historical marker
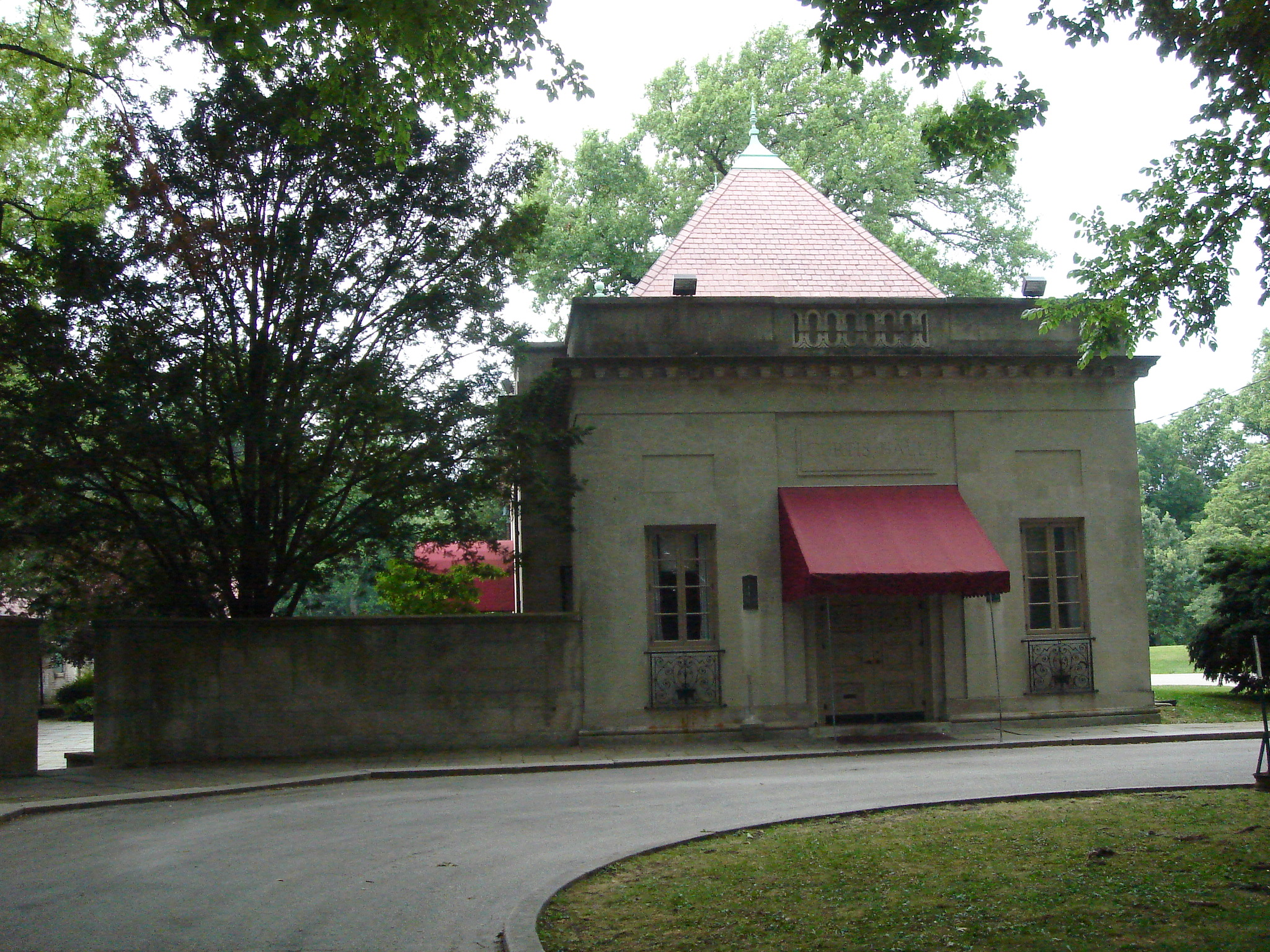
- Curtis Hall on the grounds of the Curtis Arboretum

- Location within Philadelphia
- Location: 1250 W. Church Rd. Wyncote; Cheltenham Township, Pennsylvania
- Coordinates: 40°5′6.2262″N 75°8′52.5942″W
- Area: 45 acres (180,000 m^{2})
- Built: 1937
- Architect: Baily & Truscott, et al.; Frederick Law Olmsted
- Architectural style: Renaissance Revival
- Website: Official website
- NRHP reference No.: 02000229

Significant dates
- Added to NRHP: March 20, 2002
- Designated PHMC: November 7, 2005

The Curtis Arboretum is a 45-acre (18 ha) arboretum in Wyncote, Pennsylvania. The arboretum was founded by Mary Louise Curtis Bok in honor of her father, Cyrus Curtis.

The landscaping was designed by Frederick Law Olmsted. The arboretum is listed on the National Register of Historic Places.

== Description ==
The arboretum surrounds Curtis Hall, once the ballroom of the Curtis family mansion, which now is operated by the Cheltenham Township Parks and Recreation Department. The arboretum features hills, two ponds, a dog park, a small World War II memorial, and over 50 types of trees.

Curtis Arboretum serves as the home course for the Cheltenham High School men's and women's cross country running teams.

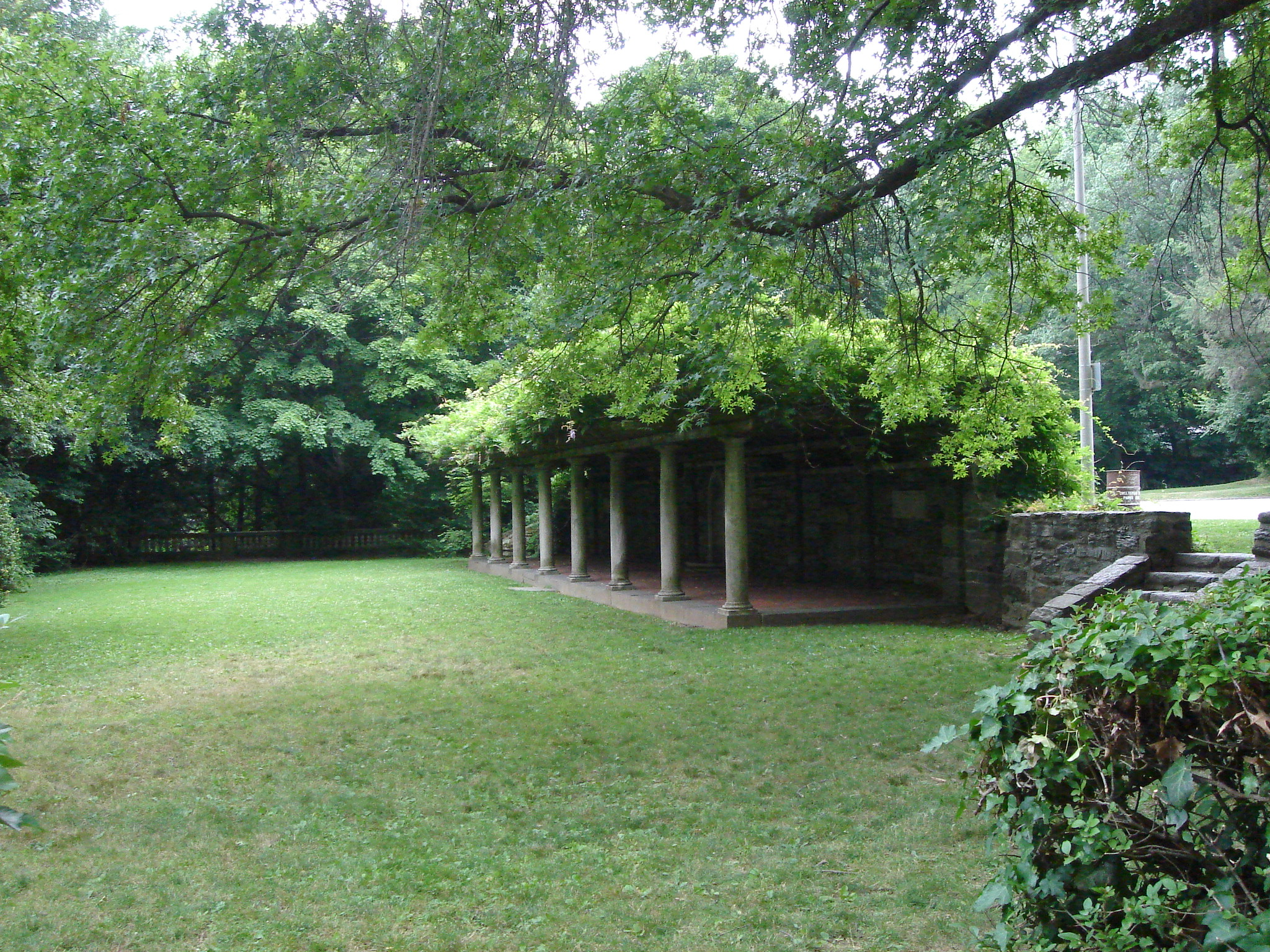
A colonnade or pergola remaining from the Curtis mansion

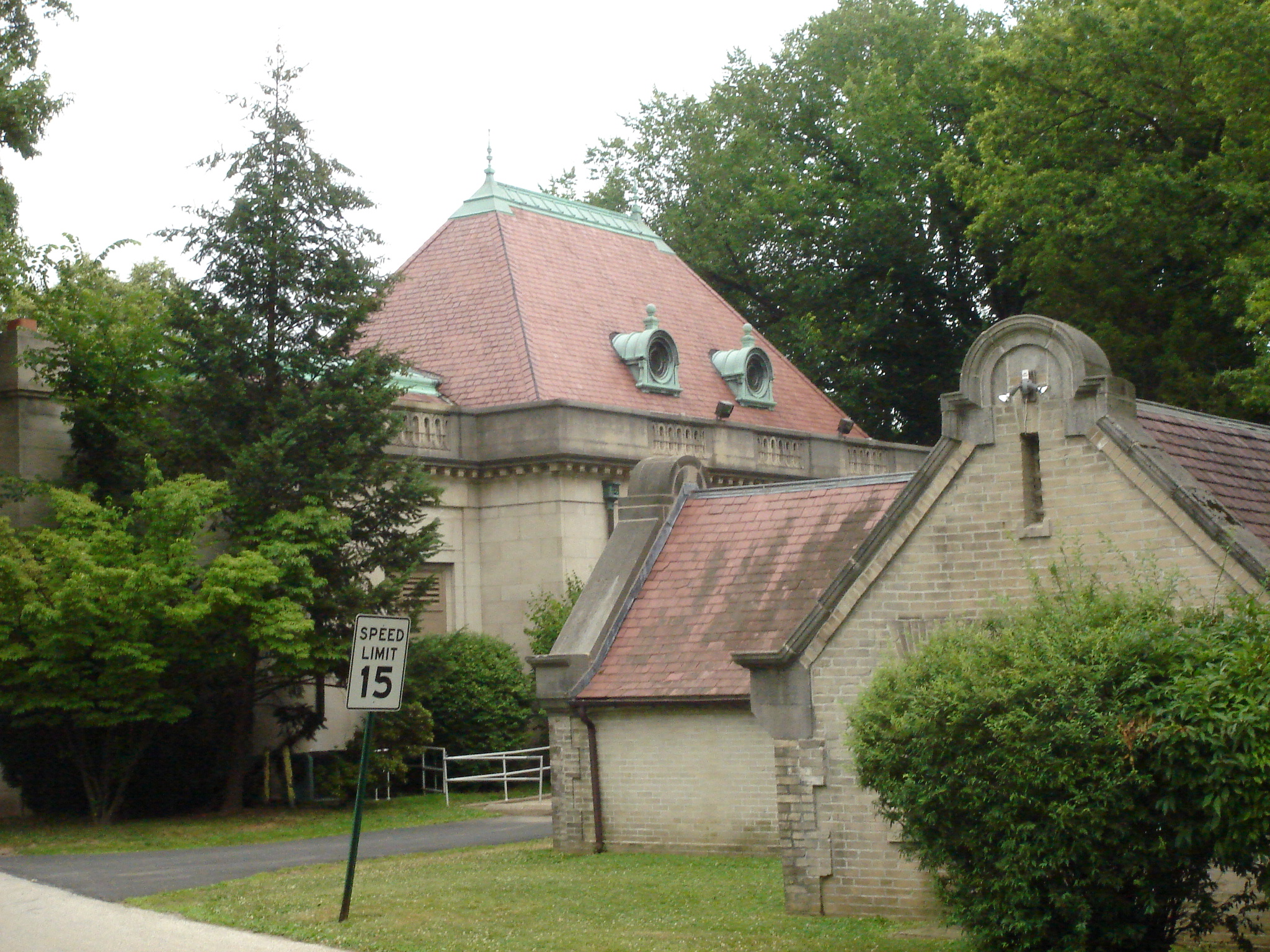
Curtis Hall from the rear

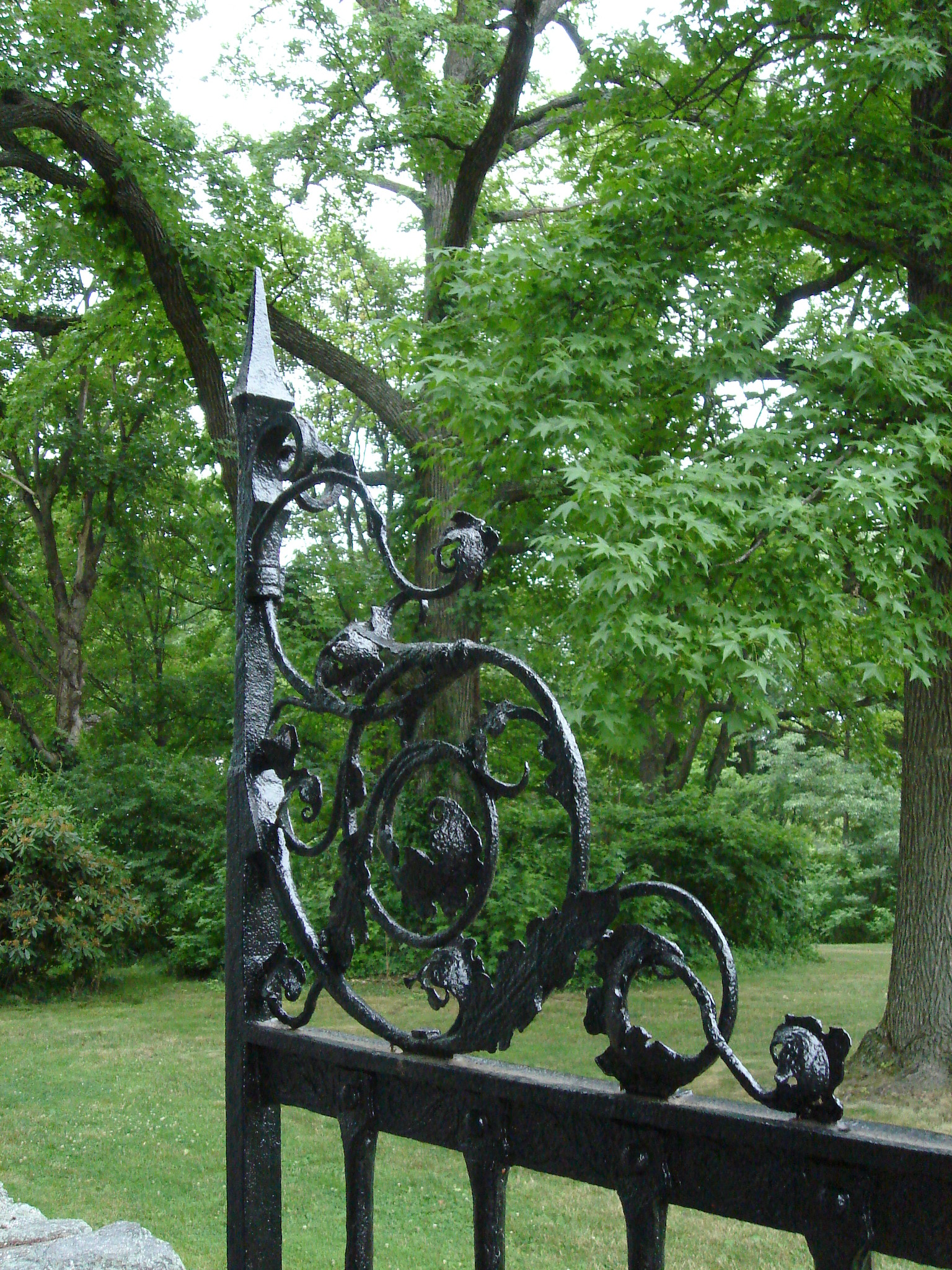
Ironwork with an oak leaf motif at the entrance gate

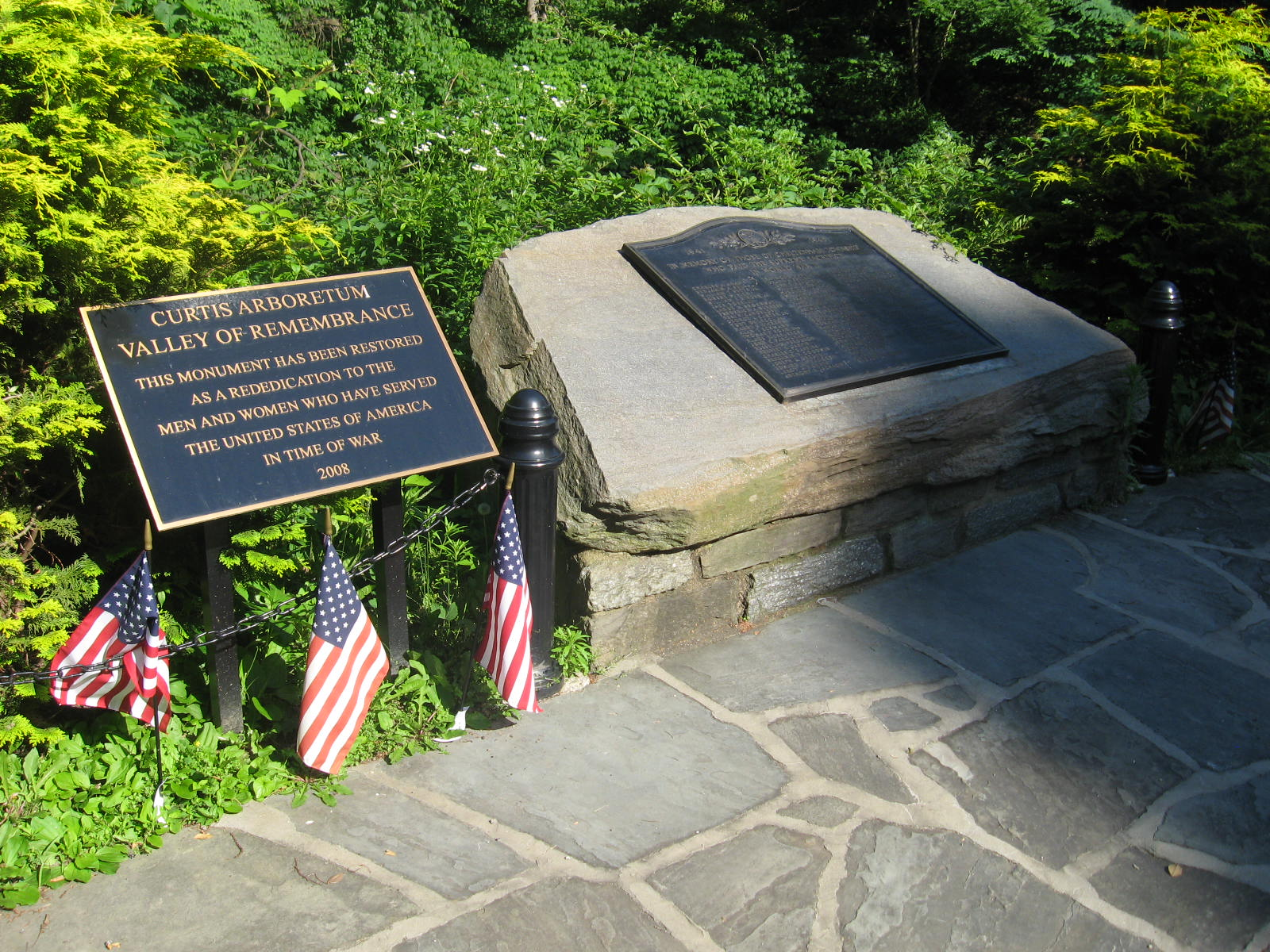
The Curtis Arboretum Valley of Remembrance

== See also ==
- List of botanical gardens in the United States
