= Wyncote, Pennsylvania =

Unincorporated community in Pennsylvania, US

- Census-designated place Cheltenham Township
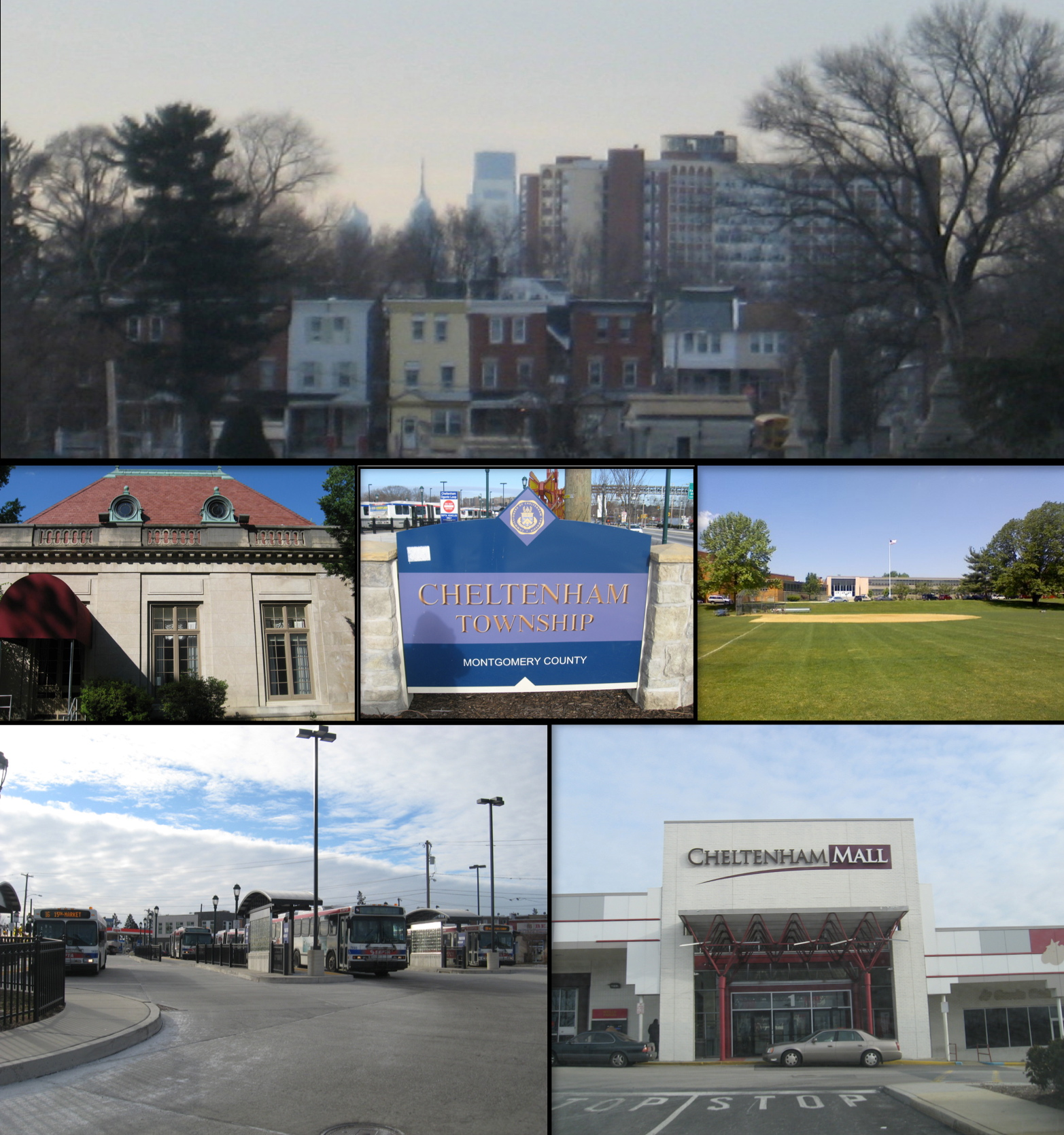
- From top L-R, Center City Philadelphia skyline from Cheltenham Avenue, Curtis Hall, Cheltenham Township welcome sign, Cheltenham High School, SEPTA City buses waiting at the Cheltenham & Ogontz Loop, Cheltenham Mall

- Location of Wyncote in Pennsylvania Wyncote, Pennsylvania (the United States)
- Coordinates: 40°05′34″N 75°08′33″W
- Country: United States
- State: Pennsylvania
- County: Montgomery
- Township: Cheltenham

Government
  - Commissioners: Art Haywood (West); Harvey Portner; Kathy A. Hampton (North)

Area
  - Total: 0.82 sq mi (2.13 km^{2})
  - Land: 0.82 sq mi (2.13 km^{2})
  - Water: 0 sq mi (0.00 km^{2})
- Elevation: 285 ft (87 m)

Population (2020)
  - Total: 3,081
  - Density: 3,751/sq mi (1,448.4/km^{2})
- Time zone: UTC-5 (Eastern Standard Time)
  - Summer (DST): UTC-4 (Eastern Daylight Time)
- ZIP Code: 19095
- Area codes: 215, 267 and 445
- FIPS code: 42-86744

Wyncote is a census-designated place (CDP) in Cheltenham Township, Montgomery County, Pennsylvania, United States. It borders the northwestern section of Philadelphia. Wyncote is located 11 miles from Center City Philadelphia at the southeasternmost tip of Montgomery County. The Jenkintown-Wyncote SEPTA station is the fifth busiest regional rail station in the SEPTA system.

Wyncote is bordered by the Cheltenham neighborhoods of Glenside, Elkins Park, La Mott, and Cedarbrook; the Philadelphia neighborhoods of West Oak Lane and Cedarbrook, as well as the borough of Jenkintown and Abington Township.

== Geography ==
Wyncote is located at 40°5′34″N 75°8′33″W. According to the U.S. Census Bureau, Wyncote has a total area of 0.8 square miles (2.1 km^{2}), all of which is land.

== Demographics ==
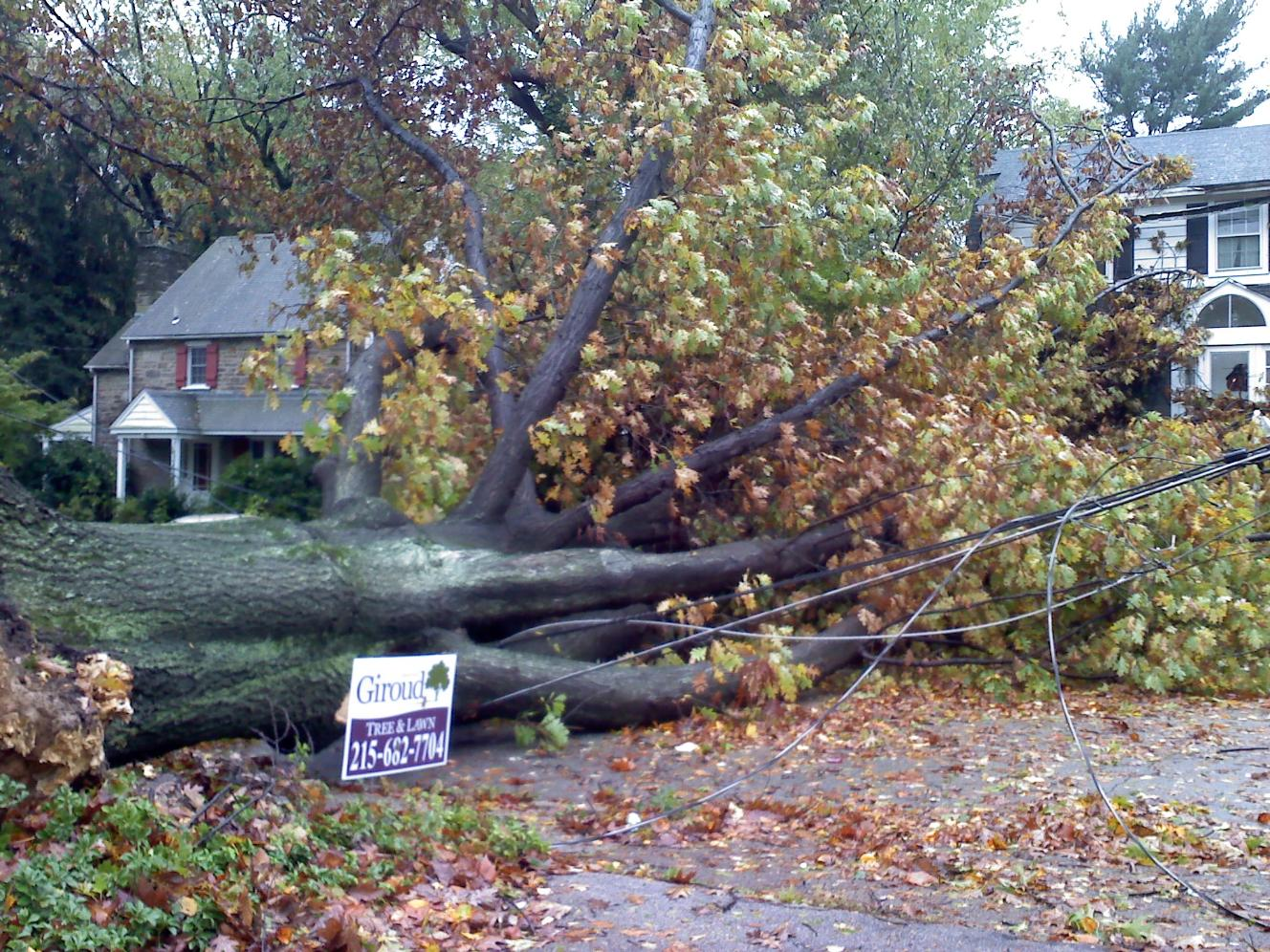
Damage in Wyncote from Hurricane Sandy in 2012

Historical population
| Census | Pop. | Note | %± |
|---|---|---|---|
| 1990 | 2,960 | | — |
| 2000 | 3,046 | | 2.9% |
| 2010 | 3,044 | | −0.1% |
| 2020 | 3,081 | | 1.2% |
U.S. Decennial Census

=== 2020 census ===
As of the 2020 census, Wyncote had a population of 3,081. The median age was 51.1 years. 15.2% of residents were under the age of 18 and 29.1% of residents were 65 years of age or older. For every 100 females there were 87.6 males, and for every 100 females age 18 and over there were 85.0 males age 18 and over.

100.0% of residents lived in urban areas, while 0.0% lived in rural areas.

There were 1,134 households in Wyncote, of which 25.8% had children under the age of 18 living in them. Of all households, 53.4% were married-couple households, 13.8% were households with a male householder and no spouse or partner present, and 28.8% were households with a female householder and no spouse or partner present. About 29.9% of all households were made up of individuals and 19.0% had someone living alone who was 65 years of age or older.

There were 1,237 housing units, of which 8.3% were vacant. The homeowner vacancy rate was 2.4% and the rental vacancy rate was 12.7%.

Racial composition as of the 2020 census
| Race | Number | Percent |
|---|---|---|
| White | 2,088 | 67.8% |
| Black or African American | 609 | 19.8% |
| American Indian and Alaska Native | 10 | 0.3% |
| Asian | 142 | 4.6% |
| Native Hawaiian and Other Pacific Islander | 0 | 0.0% |
| Some other race | 38 | 1.2% |
| Two or more races | 194 | 6.3% |
| Hispanic or Latino (of any race) | 127 | 4.1% |

=== 2010 census ===
As of the 2010 census, there were 3,044 people, 1,057 households, and 713 families residing in the CDP. The population density was 3,732.5 inhabitants per square mile (1,441.1/km^{2}). There were 1,069 housing units at an average density of 1,309.9 per square mile (505.8/km^{2}). The racial makeup of the CDP was 79.7% White, 13.6% African American, 0.03% Native American, 3.9% Asian, 0.10% Pacific Islander, 0.26% from other races, and 0.53% from two or more races. Hispanic or Latino of any race were 0.79% of the population.

There were 1,057 households, out of which 30.4% had children under the age of 18 living with them, 59.0% were married couples living together, 7.1% had a female householder with no husband present, and 32.5% were non-families. 29.5% of all households were made up of individuals, and 21.0% had someone living alone who was 65 years of age or older. The average household size was 2.48 and the average family size was 3.08.

In the CDP, the population was spread out, with 20.3% under the age of 18, 4.8% from 18 to 24, 19.5% from 25 to 44, 23.5% from 45 to 64, and 32.0% who were 65 years of age or older. The median age was 49 years. For every 100 females, there were 75.7 males. For every 100 females age 18 and over, there were 69.9 males.

The median income for a household in the CDP was $77,043, and the median income for a family was $91,217. Males had a median income of $60,592 versus $41,458 for females. The per capita income for the CDP was $32,340. None of the families and 2.2% of the population were living below the poverty line, including no under eighteens and 4.9% of those over 64.

== Notable people ==
- Eddie Applegate, actor
- Brecker Brothers, Musicians.
- Chris Conlin, All-American football player at Penn State
- Cyrus Hermann Kotzschmar Curtis, longtime publisher of The Saturday Evening Post and Ladies' Home Journal, as well as other magazines and newspapers
- John Blair Deaver (1855–1931), surgeon and educator
- Marian Filar (1917–2012), Polish-born American-based concert pianist and virtuoso
- Reggie Jackson, retired Hall of Fame baseball player; born and lived in Wyncote through high school
- George Horace Lorimer, author and longtime editor of the Saturday Evening Post
- Bernie Lowe, founder of Cameo Records.
- John Charles Martin, newspaper publisher
- Yonatan Netanyahu (1946–1976), Israeli soldier and Entebbe rescue commander; brother of Benjamin Netanyahu; attended Cheltenham High School
- Benjamin Netanyahu, currently serves his second term as Israeli prime minister, lived in township during high school
- Iddo Netanyahu, Israeli physician, author, playwright, brother of Benjamin Netanyahu and Yonatan Netanyahu
- Ezra Pound, poet; grew up in Wyncote

== Wyncote Historic District ==
- Wyncote Historic District
- U.S. National Register of Historic Places
- U.S. Historic district
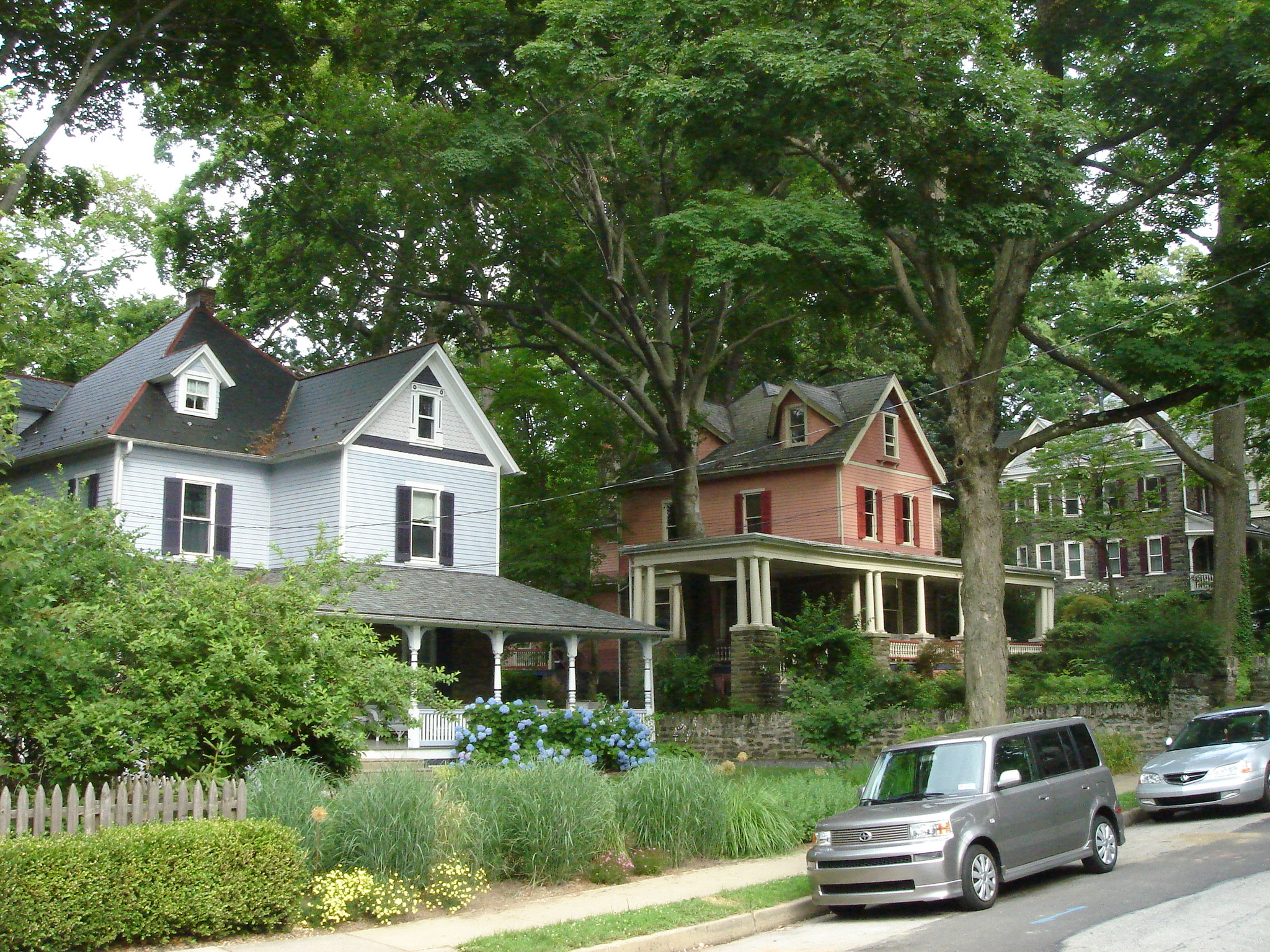
- Queen Anne-style houses in the district

- Location within Philadelphia
- Nearest city: Philadelphia, Pennsylvania
- Coordinates: 40°5′23″N 75°8′33″W
- Area: 108 acres (44 ha)
- Built: 1865
- Architect: Frank Furness, et al.
- Architectural style: Colonial Revival, Tudor Revival, Queen Anne
- NRHP reference No.: 86002884
- Added to NRHP: October 16, 1986

Wyncote features the Wyncote Historic District which is a US Historic district, added in October, 1986. It was made a historic district for its Architecture, Community Planning, and Development. The district covers over 100 acres, and 178 contributing buildings.

The Wyncote Historic District has a number of restored Victorian-era homes. The All Hallows Church (constructed 1896–1897) was designed by a firm founded by Philadelphia architect Frank Furness (Furness, Evans and Company). Wyncote also has a number of classical Philadelphia stone Colonial Revival homes; notable among them is Beechwood, designed in the school of Brognard Okie, the architect responsible for the reconstruction of Pennsbury Manor on the upper Delaware River, and Appleford in Villanova, Pennsylvania.

Wyncote Historic District
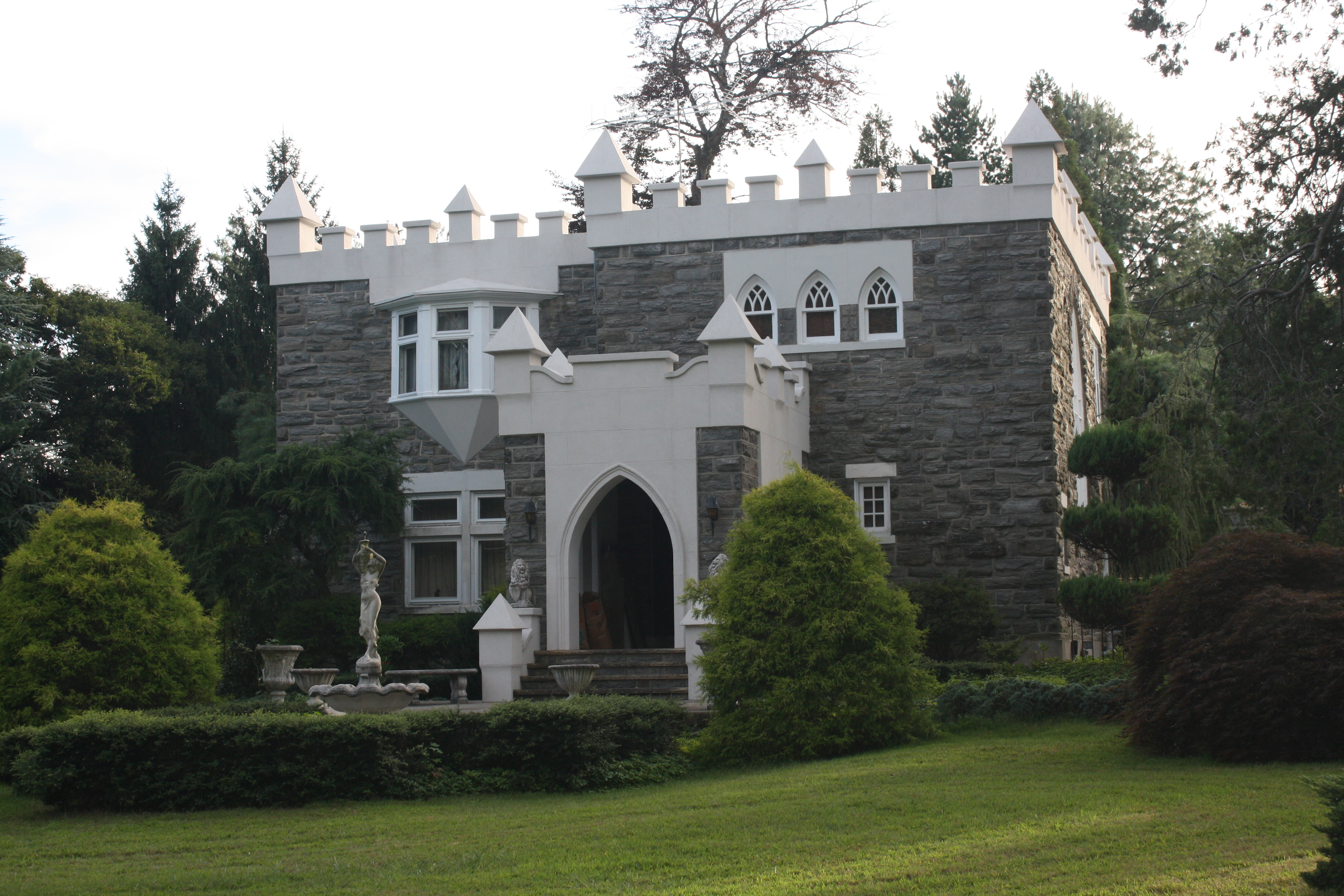
Historic Home

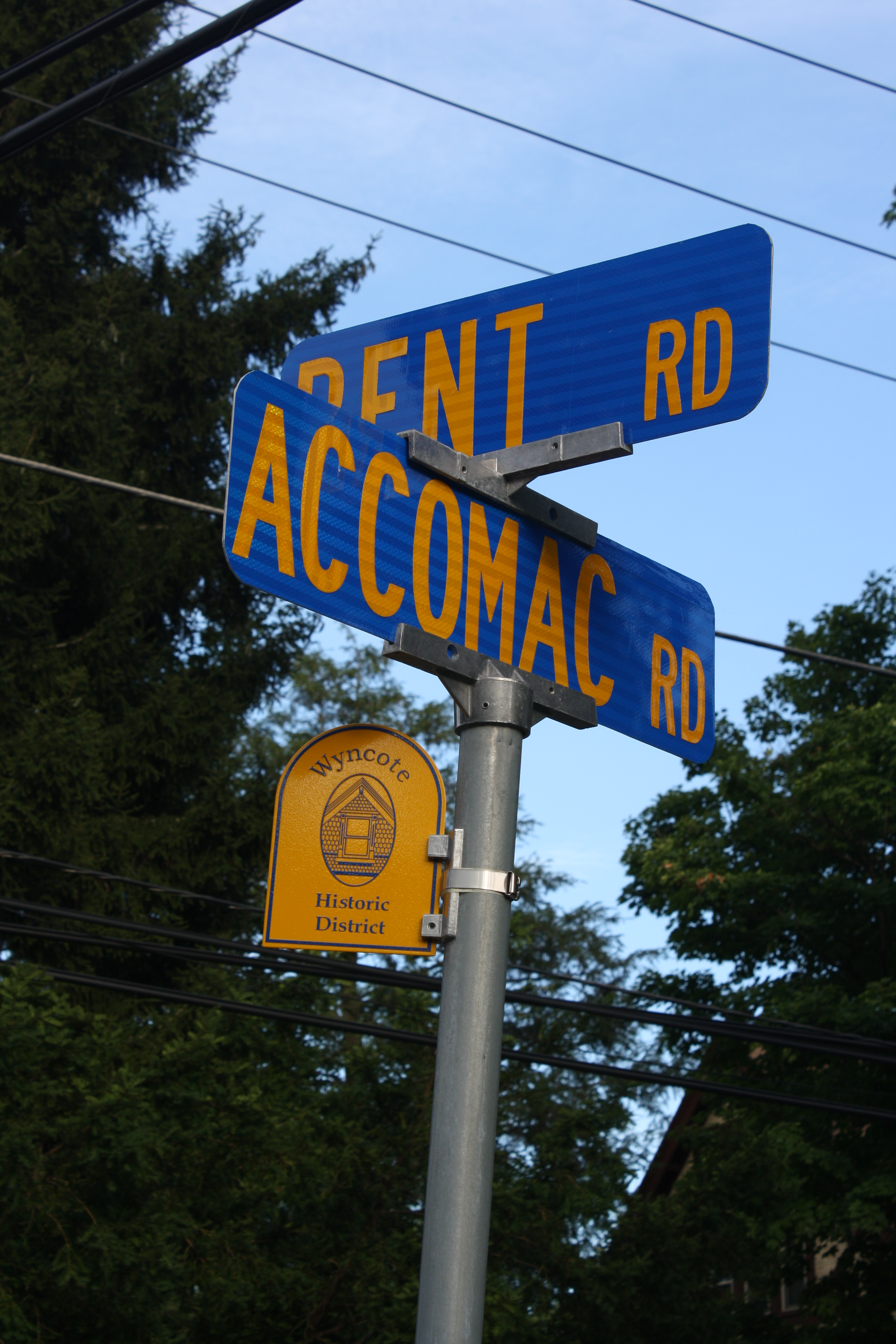
Street Sign showing the Wyncote Historic District sign on the post

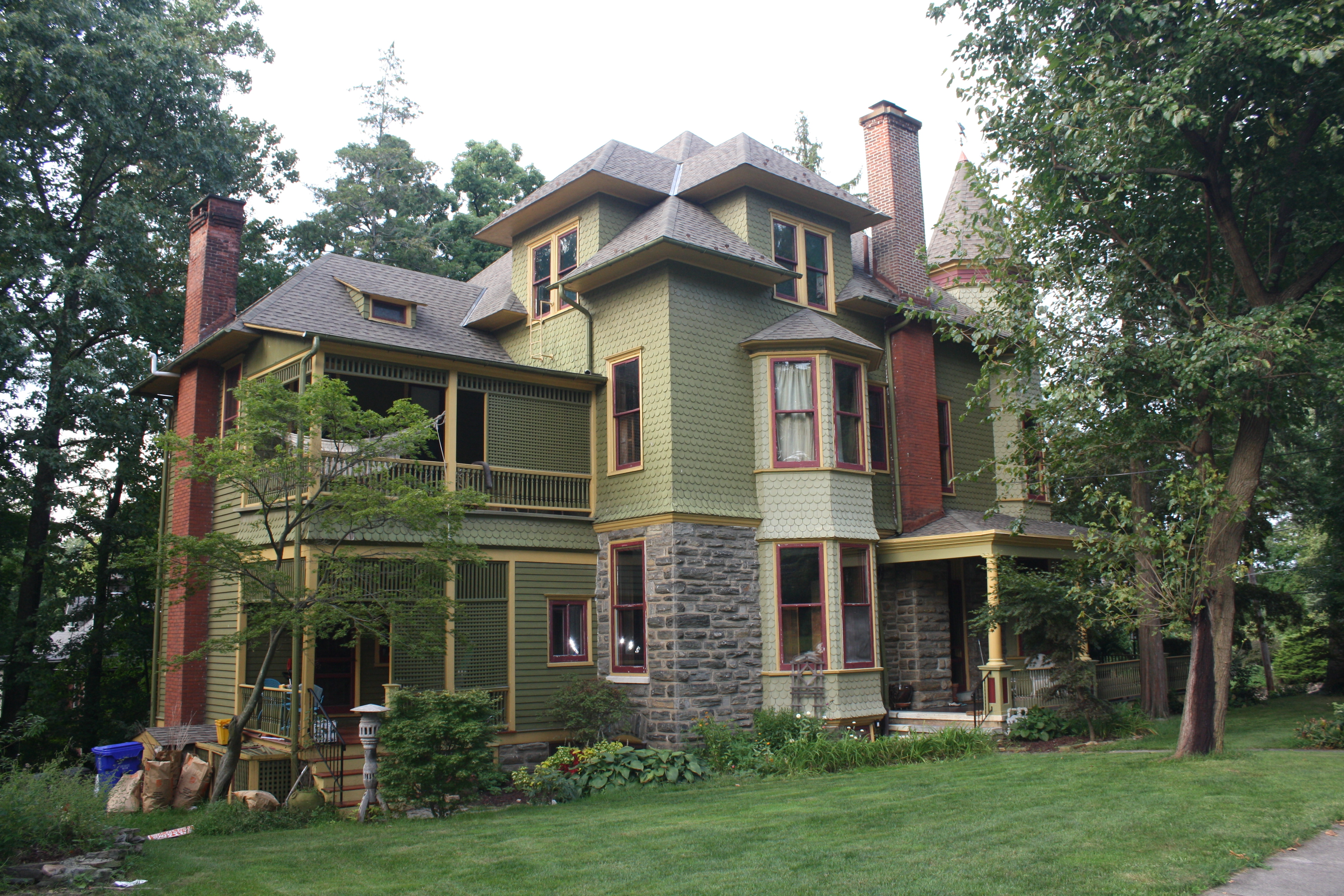
Historic Home

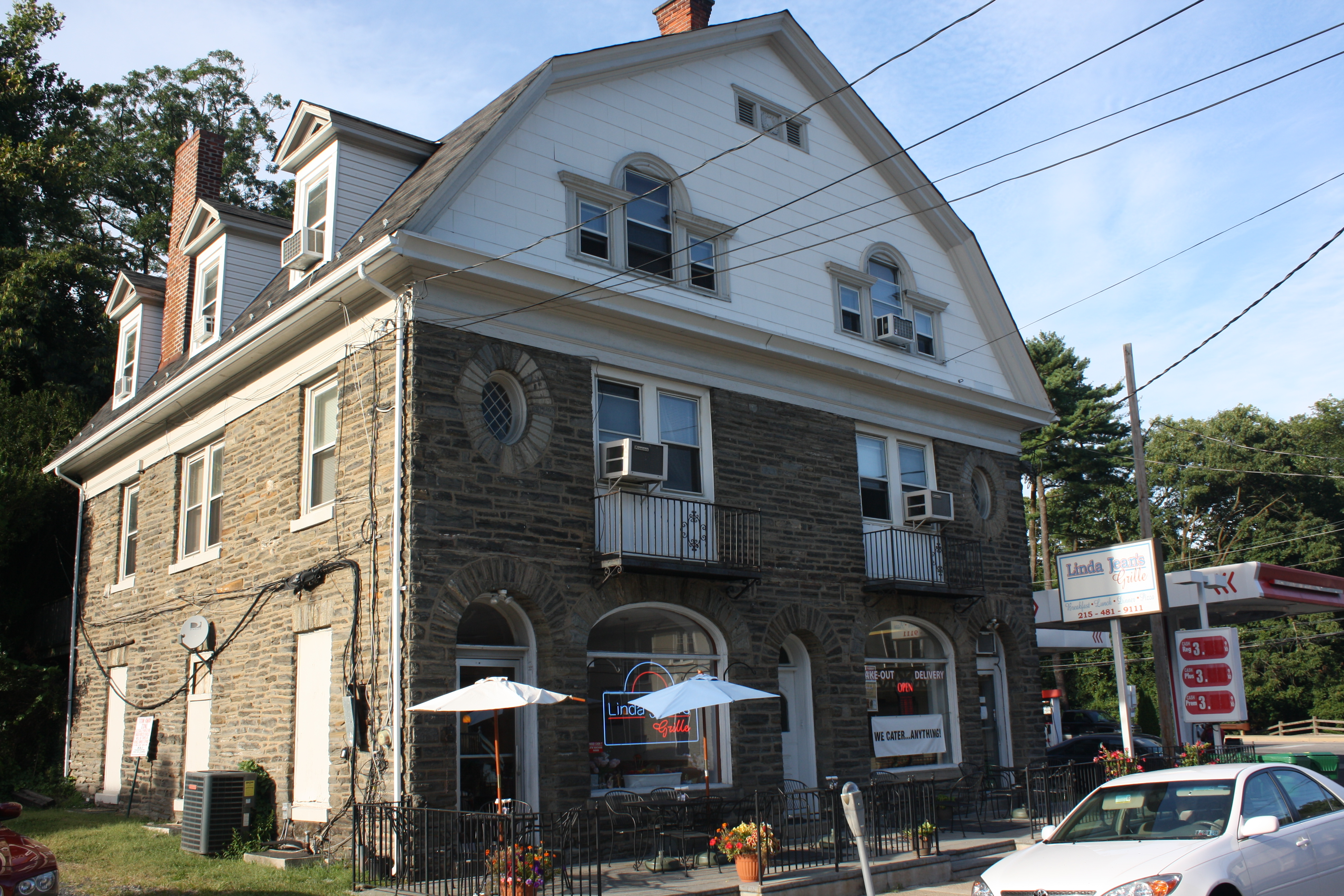
Shop in Wyncote along Greenwood Avenue

== Transportation ==
=== Public transit ===
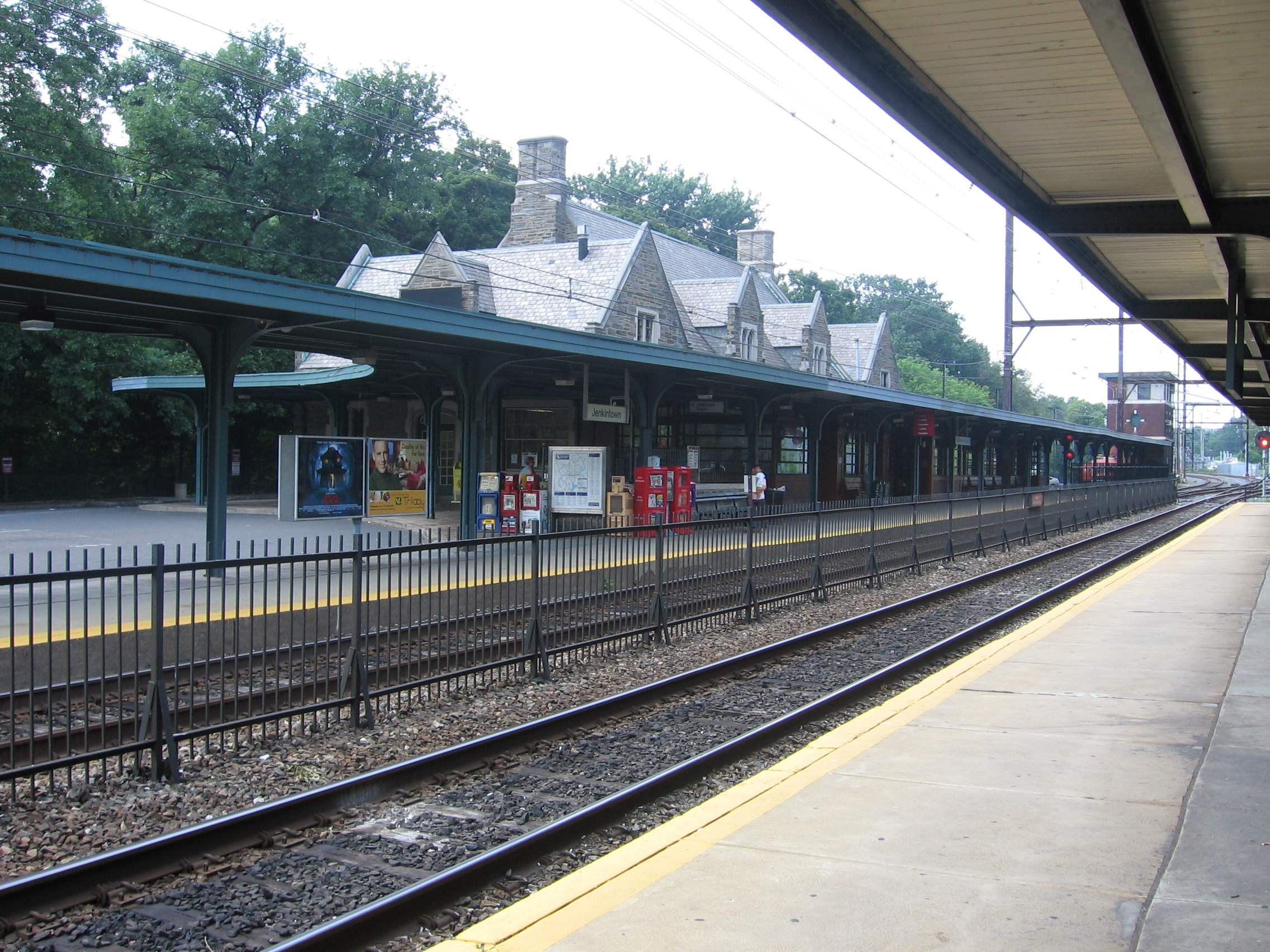
The Jenkintown–Wyncote station is one of the busiest in the SEPTA system.

Wyncote is served by SEPTA, through regional rail at the Jenkintown–Wyncote station. The building is a historic structure, dating back to its original use with the North Pennsylvania Railroad. Trains pass through regularly going south to Philadelphia or north to Bucks County. Wyncote is a 30-minute train ride from downtown Philadelphia. Wyncote is also served by SEPTA buses, in particular the 77 route, which connects Chestnut Hill to Mayfair, Philadelphia.

=== Roads ===
Wyncote is in a convenient location driving-wise; about a 25-minute drive to downtown Philadelphia, 2 hours from New York City, 2 hours to the Pocono Mountains, and 1.5 hours to the Jersey Shore, just to name a few accessible locations. The following are the most heavily traveled roads in Wyncote:

- PA 73 provides a thruway for Wyncote, Cheltenham Township, and Montgomery County as a whole.
- PA 309 has its beginnings with the intersection of PA 611, and continues up through Wyncote. It provides a key route to the Pennsylvania Turnpike.
- PA 152 also known as Limekiln Pike, connects PA 309 and PA 73 in Wyncote.

== Climate ==
Wyncote has the climate of a typical Mid-Atlantic town. Summers are hot with highs averaging in the high 80s (°F), with lows being anywhere from the high 60s to the low 80s. Summers also see some days climb into the 90s, and even some that top the 100-degree mark. Spring and Fall are pleasant, with highs averaging in the mid 60s, and lows in the mid 40s. Winters are cold, with highs averaging around 40, and lows averaging in the high teens. The middle of winter occasionally sees a few days where highs do not rise above the teens, and lows fall into the single digits. The following is a chart of the average temperatures in Wyncote

Climate data for Wyncote, Pennsylvania
| Month | Jan | Feb | Mar | Apr | May | Jun | Jul | Aug | Sep | Oct | Nov | Dec | Year |
|---|---|---|---|---|---|---|---|---|---|---|---|---|---|
| Record high °F | 73 | 73 | 88 | 95 | 96 | 102 | 102 | 102 | 98 | 88 | 82 | 76 | 102 |
| Mean daily maximum °F | 37 | 42 | 50 | 62 | 72 | 81 | 85 | 84 | 77 | 65 | 54 | 43 | 62.6 |
| Mean daily minimum °F | 18 | 22 | 32 | 41 | 51 | 62 | 67 | 65 | 56 | 43 | 34 | 23 | 42.8 |
| Record low °F | −11 | −3 | −1 | 16 | 32 | 34 | 45 | 37 | 30 | 20 | 11 | −10 | −11 |
| Average precipitation inches | 3.44 | 3.01 | 4.32 | 4.12 | 4.37 | 4.60 | 5.05 | 3.98 | 4.53 | 3.82 | 3.94 | 4.23 | 49.41 |
| Record high °C | 23 | 23 | 31 | 35 | 36 | 39 | 39 | 39 | 37 | 31 | 28 | 24 | 39 |
| Mean daily maximum °C | 3 | 6 | 10 | 17 | 22 | 27 | 29 | 29 | 25 | 18 | 12 | 6 | 17.0 |
| Mean daily minimum °C | −8 | −6 | 0 | 5 | 11 | 17 | 19 | 18 | 13 | 6 | 1 | −5 | 6.0 |
| Record low °C | −24 | −19 | −18 | −9 | 0 | 1 | 7 | 3 | −1 | −7 | −12 | −23 | −24 |
| Average precipitation mm | 87 | 76 | 110 | 105 | 111 | 117 | 128 | 101 | 115 | 97 | 100 | 107 | 1,255 |
Source: The Weather Channel "The Weather Channel". The Weather Channel.

== Points of interest ==
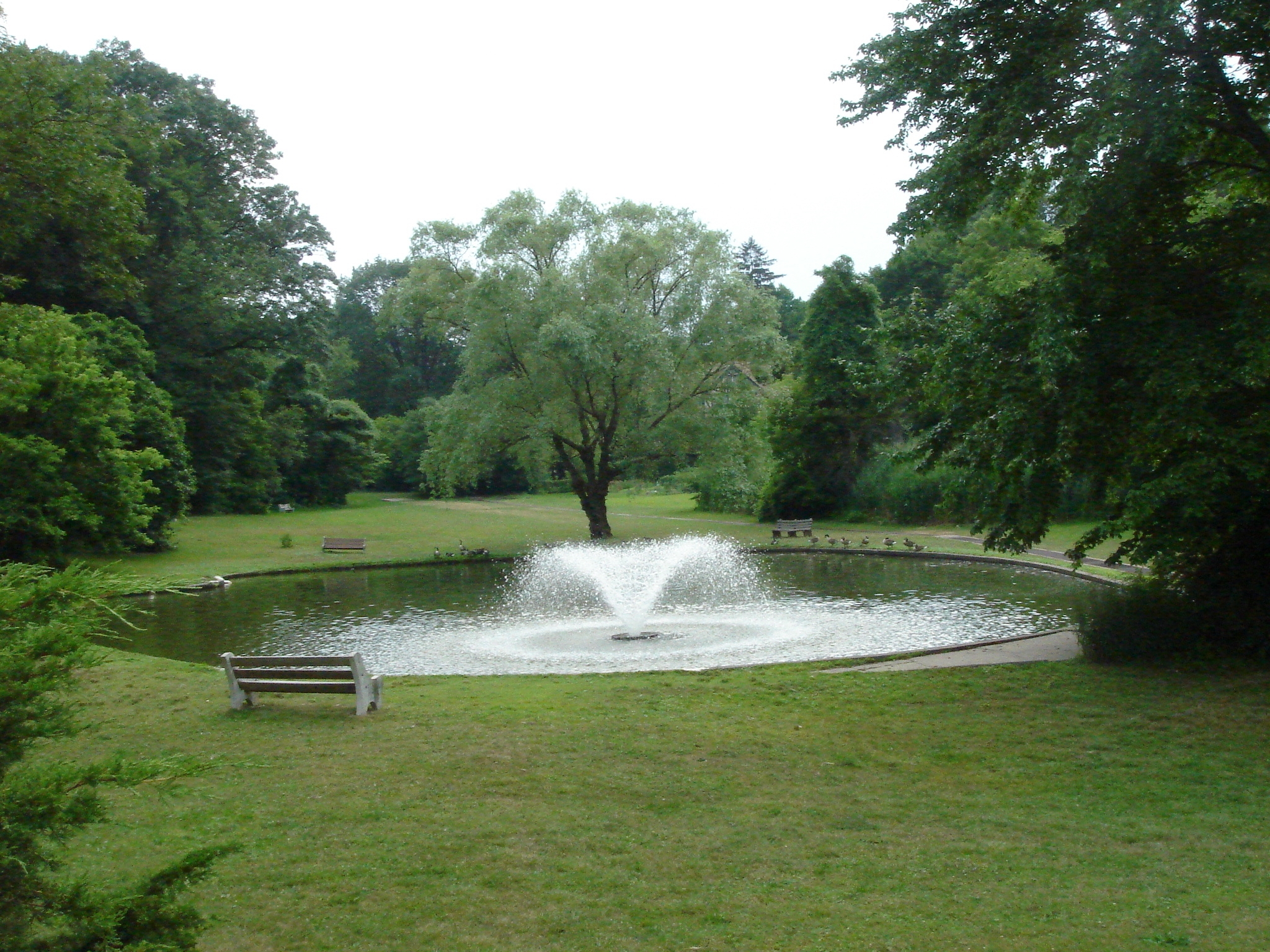
Robinson park in Wyncote. The pond in the background typically freezes, and provides recreation for the locals.

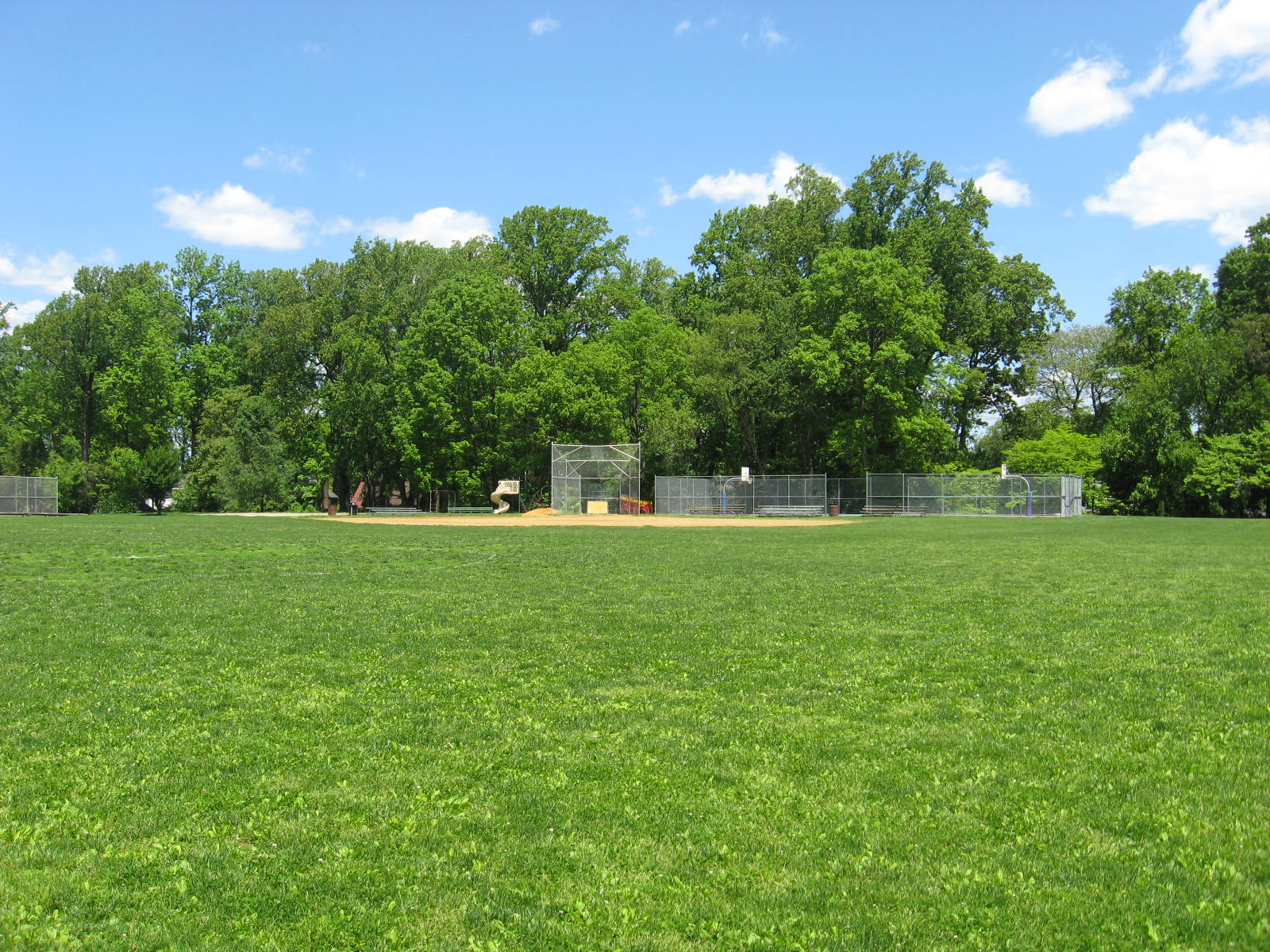
Thomas Williams Park

- Curtis Arboretum
- Thomas Williams Park

== Schools ==
- Ancillae Assumpta Academy
- Wyncote Elementary School
- Cedarbrook Middle School
- Cheltenham High School
- Wyncote Academy
- Bishop McDevitt High School (Wyncote, Pennsylvania)
- Reconstructionist Rabbinical College, the only seminary affiliated with Reconstructionist Judaism
- Arcadia University
