= St. John the Baptist Roman Catholic Church =

St. John the Baptist Roman Catholic Church may refer to:

- St. John the Baptist Roman Catholic Church (Newark, Delaware)
- St. John the Baptist Roman Catholic Church (Wilder, Kentucky)
- St. John the Baptist Roman Catholic Church (Glandorf, Ohio)
- St. John the Baptist Roman Catholic Church, Manayunk Philadelphia, PA
