= Kotzschmar =

Kotzschmar may refer to:

- Cyrus Hermann Kotzschmar Curtis, an American publisher who was named after Hermann Kotzschmar
- Hermann Kotzschmar, a German-American musician
- Kotzschmar Memorial Organ, a pipe organ located in Portland, Maine
