= Will C. Macfarlane =

American composer (1870–1945)

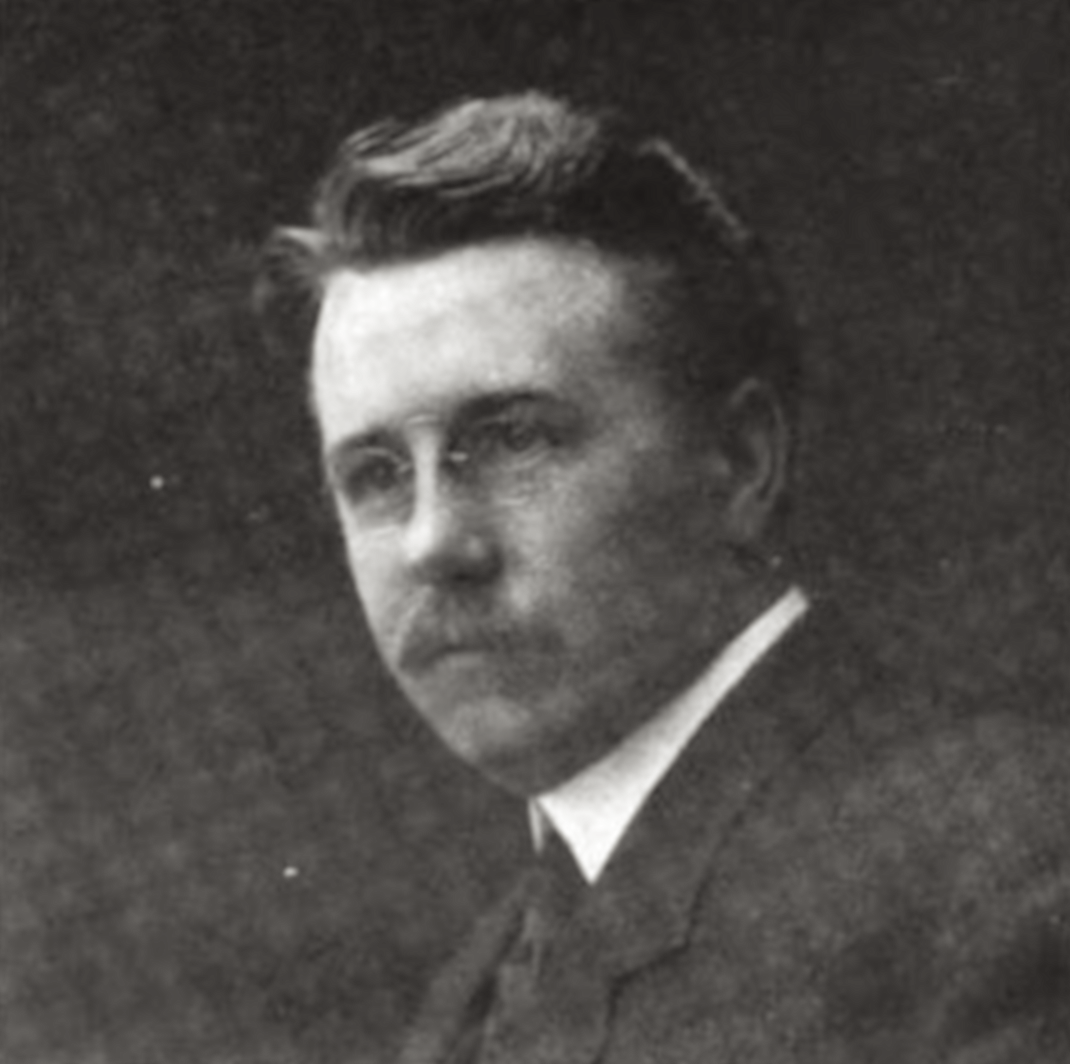
Will C. Macfarlane

William Charles Macfarlane, generally referred to as Will C. Macfarlane, (October 2, 1870 – May 12, 1945) was an English-born American composer, choirmaster, and organist. Born in London, he moved to New York City as a child. There he became a well known organist and choirmaster, holding posts at Unitarian Church of All Souls (1888–1900), Temple Emanu-El (1898–1912), and Saint Thomas Church (1900–1912). From 1912 until 1919 he was municipal organist in Portland, Maine, a post created by the city for use of the Kotzschmar Memorial Organ at the Merrill Auditorium. While he predominantly composed sacred music, he also wrote the music to the operettas Little Almond Eyes (1917) and Swords and Scissors (1918).

== Life and career ==
The son of Duncan Macfarlane, William Charles Macfarlane was born in London, England on October 2, 1870. He immigrated with his family to the United States at the age of 4; settling in New York City. His earliest musical training was received from his father, and as a treble vocalist at Christ Church (Episcopal) in New York City. He was a student of composer, conductor, and organist Samuel Prowse Warren who was his primary instructor in organ and music theory.

Macfarlane made his debut as a concert organist at Chickering Hall in 1885. In New York City he held organist/choirmaster posts at the Unitarian Church of All Souls (1888–1900), Temple Emanu-El (1898–1912), and Saint Thomas Church (1900–1912). He also worked as an organist at the Broadway Tabernacle. He was a founding member of the American Guild of Organists in 1896, and compiled The Church Service Book (1912). He was also the conductor of the Yonkers Choral Society from 1902 to 1912. From 1912 until 1919 he was municipal organist in Portland, Maine, where he presented 40 recitals annually on the Kotzschmar Memorial Organ during that period. In 1915 he gave a concert tour along the Pacific Coast of the United States.

His compositional output was mainly dedicated to sacred music like anthems, hymns, pieces for organ, sacred songs, and the cantata The Message of the Cross. However, he did compose the music to the operettas Little Almond Eyes (1917) and Swords and Scissors (1918). He also wrote an operetta for the Boy Scouts of America, America First, A Boy Scout Operetta (1917). In 1897 he won the Clemson medal for one of his anthems, and he won the Chicago Madrigal Club's Kimball Prize for music composition in 1911, 1914, and 1917. He was the recipient of honorary master's (1915) and doctoral degrees (1918) from Bates College.

Macfarlane died at his home in Kearsarge, New Hampshire, on May 12, 1945. He was 74 years old.

== Partial list of compositions ==
- Three Pieces, Op. 27 (1888)
- Hymns (1893)
- Romanza (1905)
- Scherzo (1905)
- Cantilena in D♭ (1907)
- Reverie (1909)
- Spring Song (1909)
- Caprice (1910)
- Meditation (1910)
- Evening Bells (1912)
- Cradle Song (1912)
- Lullaby (1914)
- Elegy (1915)
- Scotch Fantasia on National Airs
- Folk Songs (1915)
- Serenade (1917)
- March: America the Beautiful (1918)
- In Memoriam (1923)
- Chanson Joyeuse (1930)
- Adoration (1934)
- Ad ecclesiae gloriam
- Fantasy (1945)
- Marche Pontificale (1945)
- Pastorale (1945)
