= James Bellak =

Bohemian-American musician

- Born: March 1, 1813; Prague, Bohemia
- Died: September 1, 1891 (aged 78); Atlantic City, New Jersey, U.S.
- Education: Charles University
- Occupation: Musician
- Spouse: Nina Bellak

James Bellak (March 1, 1813 – September 1, 1891) was a Bohemian-American musician and instrument manufacturer active in Philadelphia during the nineteenth century.

Bellak was born in Prague and educated at the former Jesuit College. He was involved in calico manufacturing until political unrest caused him to immigrate to the United States in 1846. Bellak began teaching music in Philadelphia and in 1854 began manufacturing pianos and organs. Bellak himself served as organist at St. Joseph's Roman Catholic Church, St. John's Roman Catholic Church, and the Church of the Holy Trinity. He composed music and was active in his business until a couple years before his death.

Bellak's youngest son, Alfred, died suddenly on February 11, 1891, after developing inflammatory rheumatism the previous November. James Bellak and his wife were both already in poor health. Mr. Bellak died on September 1; he was survived by his two eldest sons, Leopold and Charles, and his two daughters, Bertha and Betty. His widow did not long survive him, dying on October 7, 1891.

James Bellak was a Freemason (Rising Star Lodge No. 126 and Columbia Mark Lodge No. 91 in the Scottish Rite), an Odd Fellow (Herman Lodge No. 7, I.O.O.F.), and a member of the Union League. His estate, including the piano and organ business bequeathed to his sons, was valued at $200,000 to the surprise of the Philadelphia music community, which had imagined him to be even wealthier.
