= Cora S. Briggs =

American organist and composer

Cora Skillings Briggs (Note: Her first surname can be rendered as Skilling without the letter s.) (13 May 1859, South Paris, Maine – 12 December 1935) was an American composer and organist. She studied harmony with Stephen A. Emery and piano and organ with Hermann Kotzschmar and E. W. Hanscom; performed as the organist for the First Congregational Church of her birthplace for forty-eight years. She wrote around eighty sacred Christian songs, the most famous one being Hold Thou My Hand. Her husband, George A. Briggs was a vocalist.

== List of compositions ==
Some of the compositions are stored in Christopher A. Reynolds Collection of Women’s Song.

- Hold Thou My hand
- Song of Confidence
- What Would You Say, Dear?
