= Temple Emanu-El (New York, 1868) =

Former Reform synagogue in Manhattan, New York

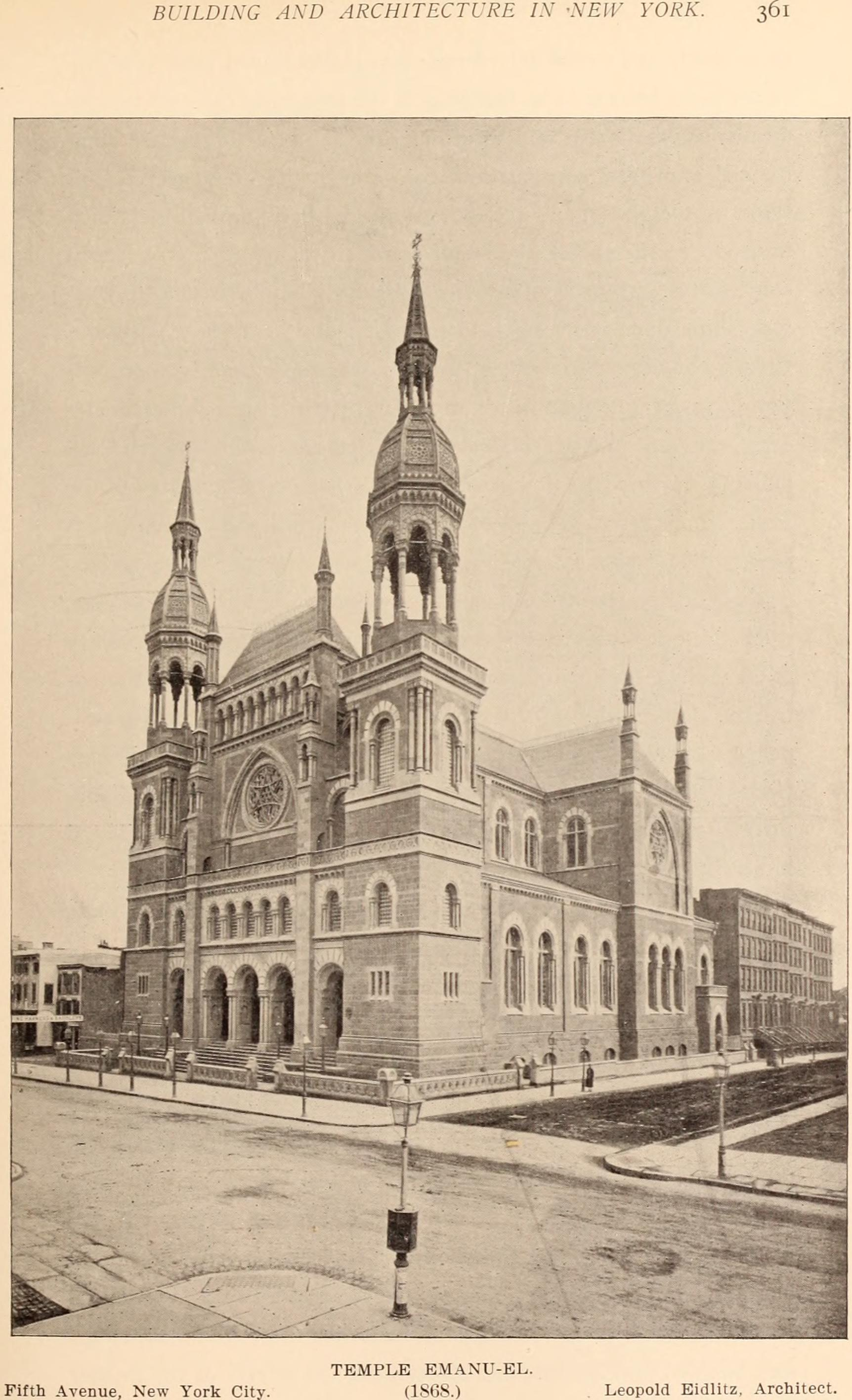
- A postcard of the former synagogue, before the construction of Delmonico's 1897 fifth avenue restaurant.

- Location of the former synagogue in Manhattan, New York City

Religion
- Affiliation: Reform Judaism (former)
- Ecclesiastical or organisational status: Synagogue (1868–1927)
- Ownership: Congregation Emanu-El of New York
- Status: Closed; demolished

Location
- Location: Fifth Avenue and 43rd Street in Modtown Manhattan, New York City, New York
- Country: United States
- Coordinates: 40°45′14″N 73°58′48″W

Architecture
- Architects: Leopold Eidlitz; Henry Fernbach
- Type: Synagogue
- Style: Moorish Revival
- Established: 1845 (as a congregation)
- Groundbreaking: 1866
- Completed: 1868
- Demolished: 1927 (replaced in 1930)

Temple Emanu-El was a large Reform Jewish synagogue located on Fifth Avenue and 43rd Street in Midtown Manhattan, New York City, New York, United States. Built in 1868, it was demolished in 1927.

== History ==
In 1868, the Congregation Emanu-El of New York erected a new synagogue building for the first time, a Moorish Revival structure designed by Leopold Eidlitz, assisted by Henry Fernbach, at 43rd Street and 5th Avenue after raising about $650,000. It was demolished in 1927, and replaced by a 1930s synagogue, also called Temple Emanu-El.

== Notable people ==
- Will C. Macfarlane, organist at Temple Emanu-El from 1898-1912.

== Gallery ==
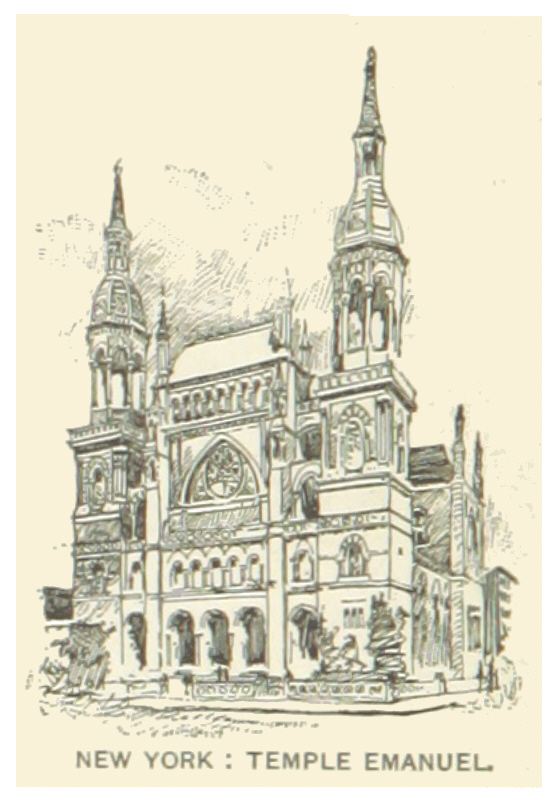

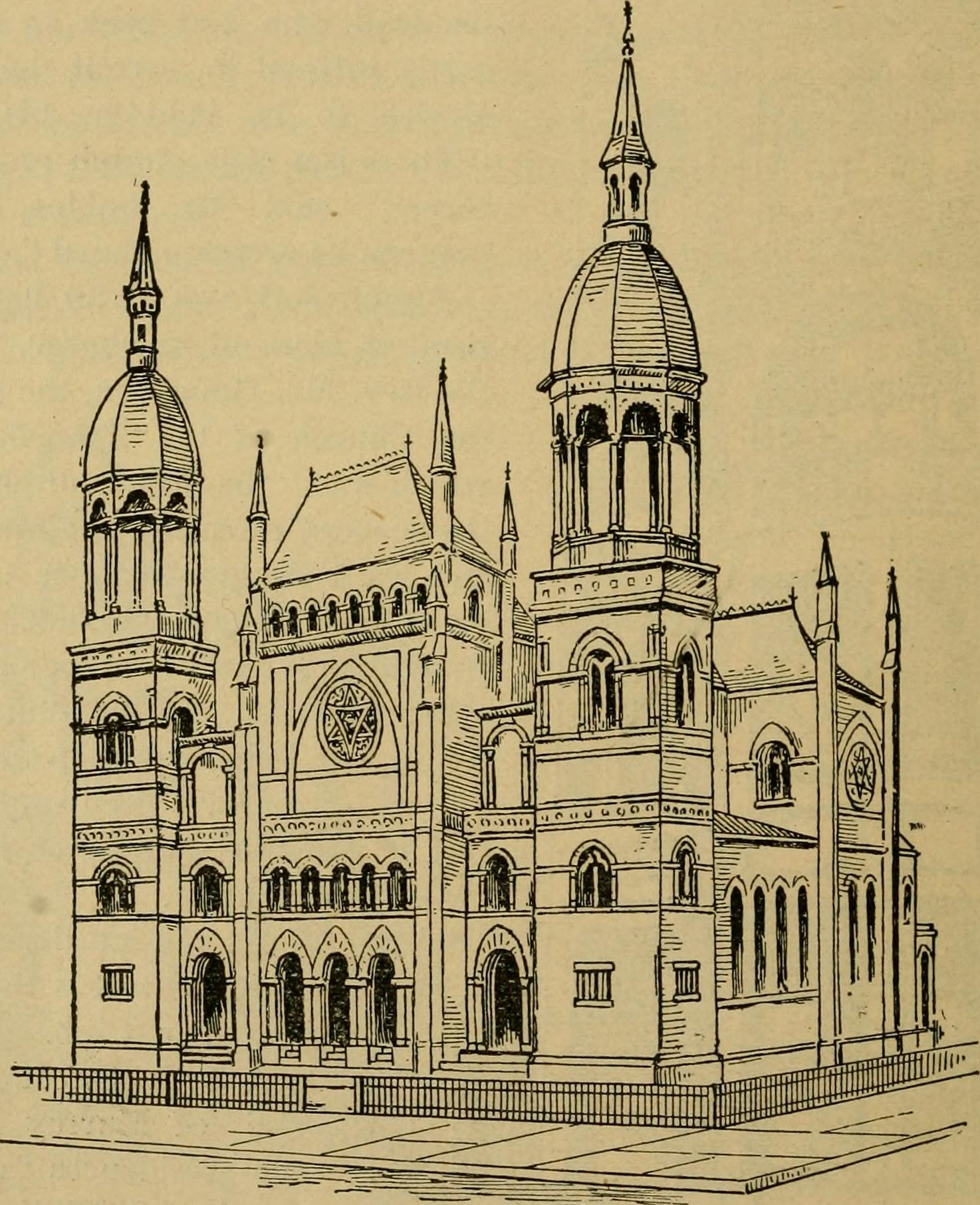

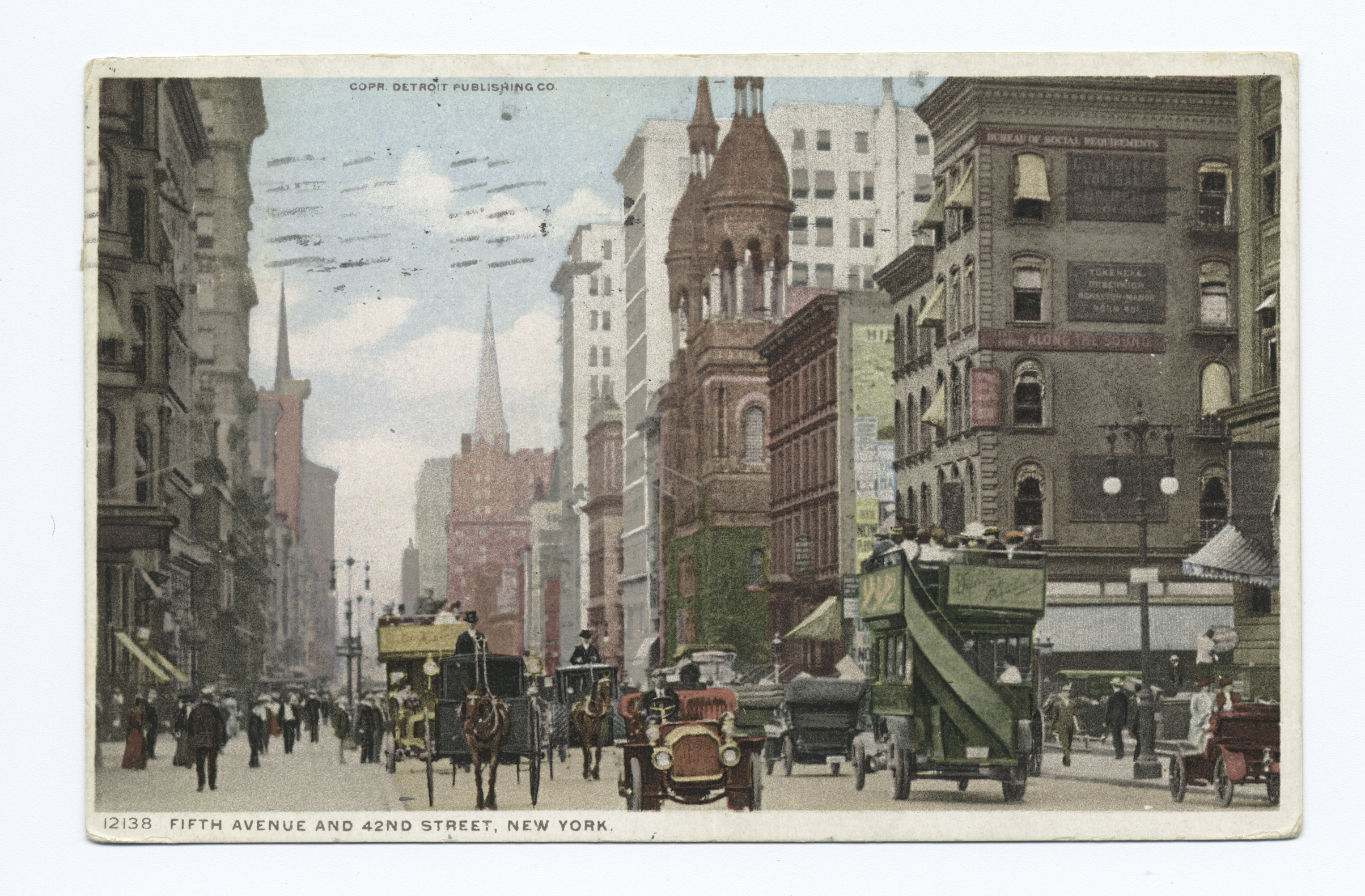

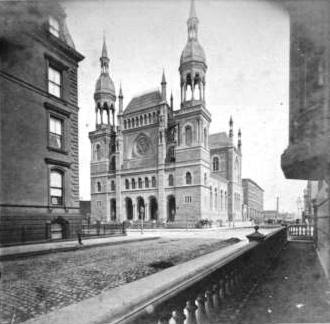

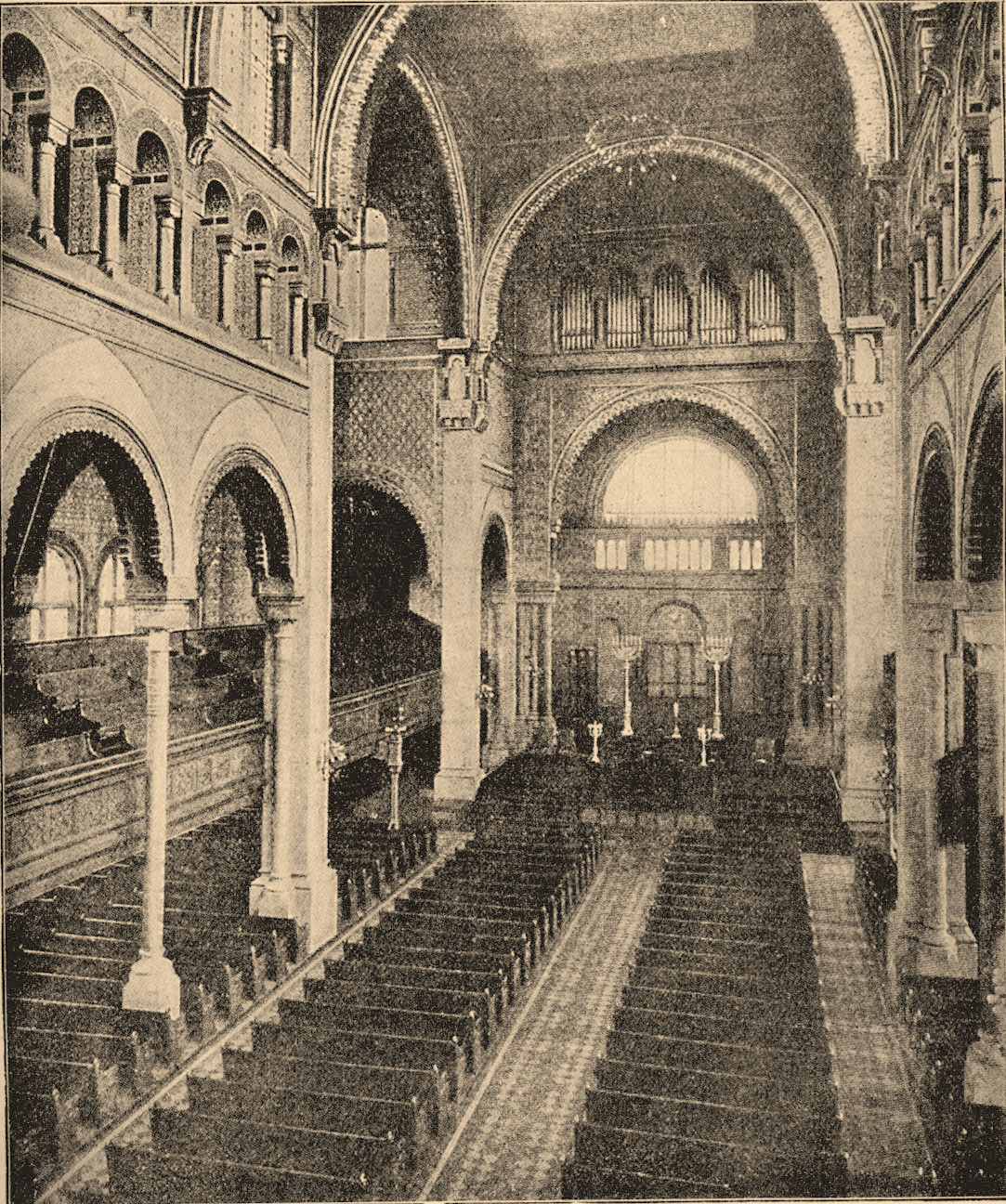
