= First Parish Church (Portland, Maine) =

Historic church in Maine, United States

- U.S. National Register of Historic Places
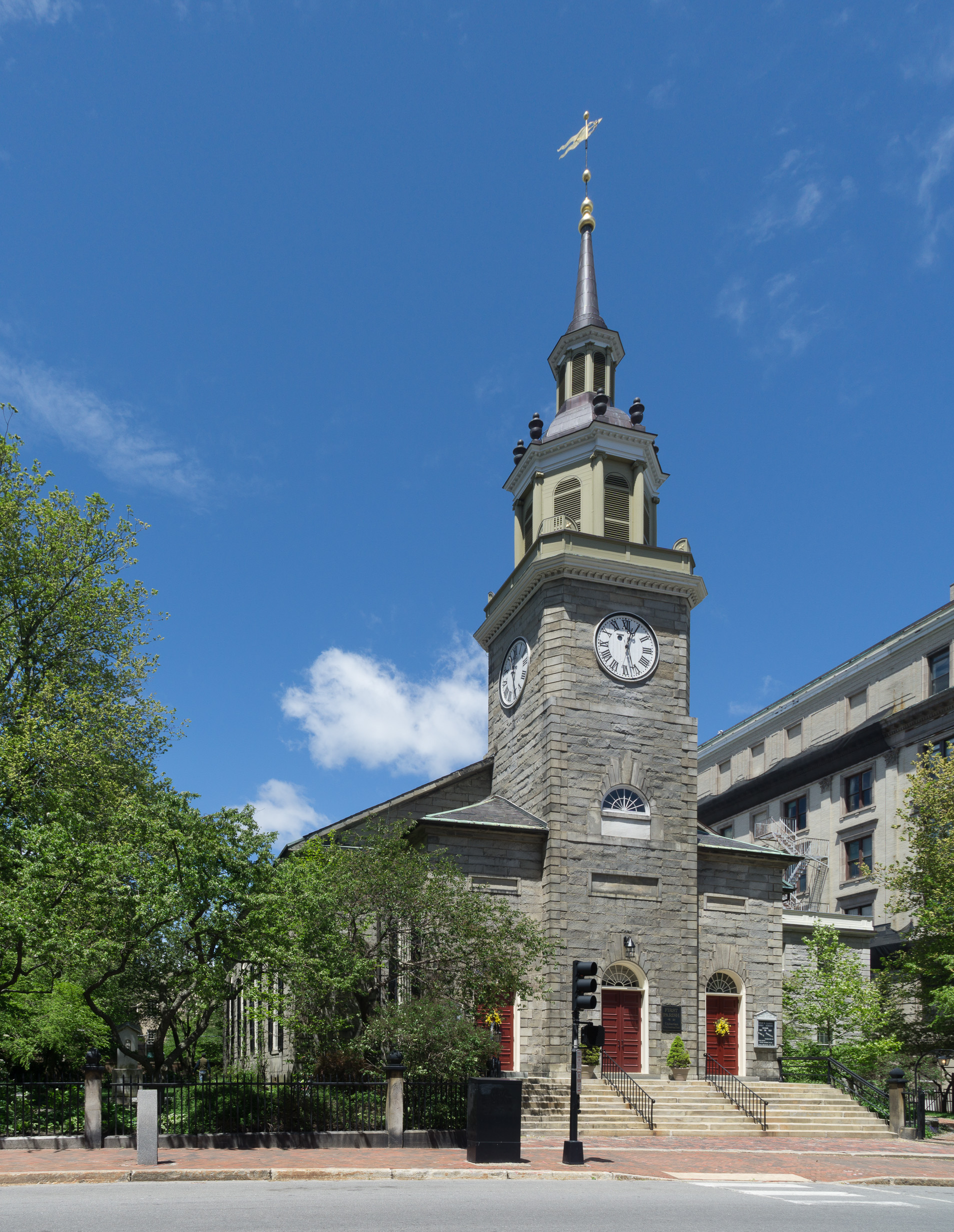
- Pictured in 2017

- Location within Maine Location within the United States
- Location: 425 Congress St., Portland, Maine
- Coordinates: 43°39′30″N 70°15′32″W
- Area: less than one acre
- Built: 1825
- Architect: multiple
- Architectural style: Federal
- NRHP reference No.: 73000113
- Added to NRHP: January 12, 1973

First Parish Church is a historic church at 425 Congress Street in Portland, Maine. Built in 1825 for a congregation established in 1674, it is the oldest church building in the city, and one of its finest examples of Federal period architecture. It was listed on the National Register of Historic Places in 1973. The congregation is Unitarian Universalist; its pastor is Reverend Norman Allen.

== Description and history ==
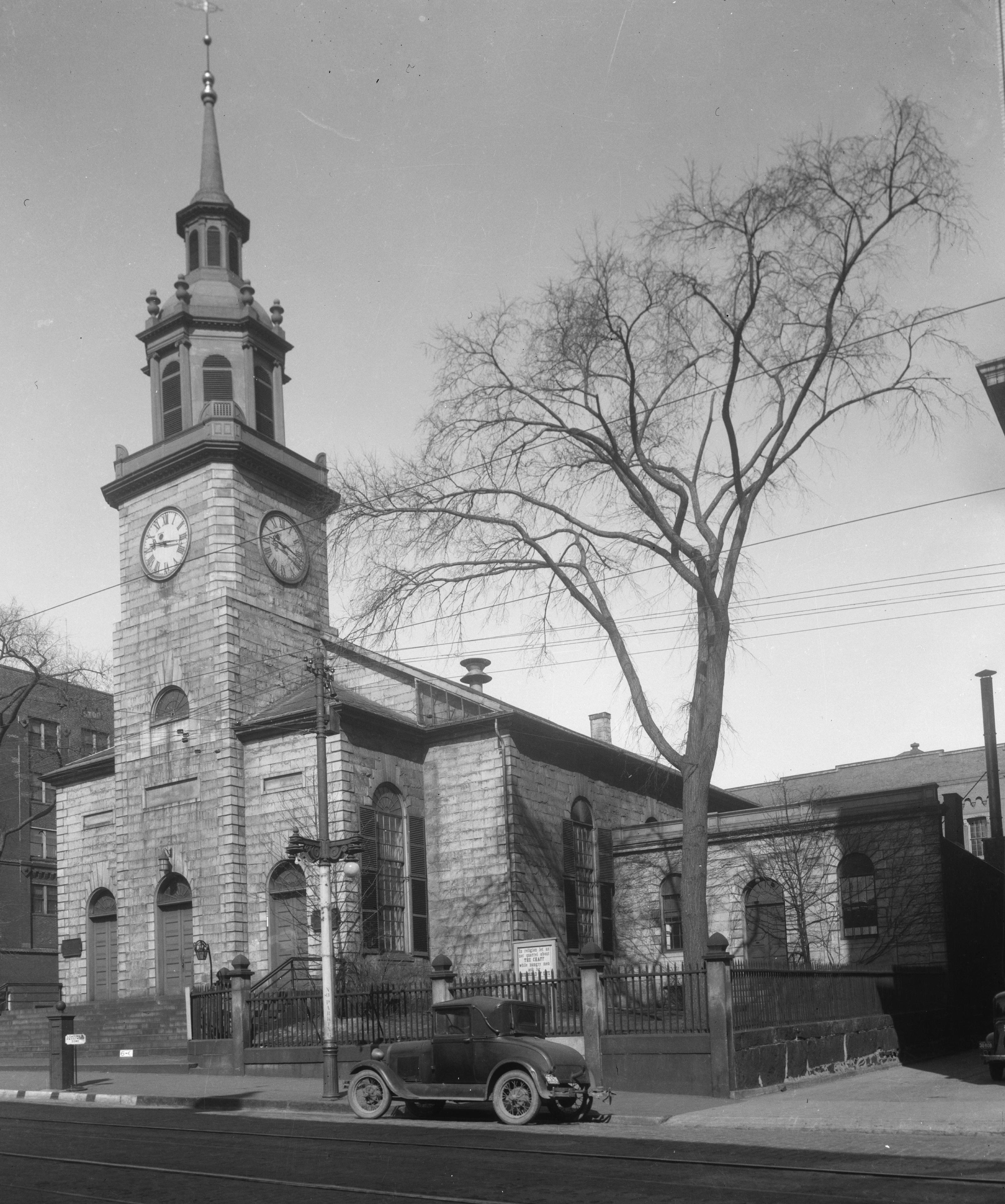
1936 photo

The First Parish Church stands on the north side of Congress Street, opposite its intersection with Temple Street (formerly Meetinghouse Lane), in the civic heart of Portland, with Portland City Hall a short way to the east, the public library a short way west, and Portland High School immediately to its north. The church is a tall single-story structure, built out of granite from Freeport. The granite is ashlar, except for finely dressed corner quoining. The building is basically rectangular, with a projecting three-bay entrance vestibule, from which a square tower projects slightly further. The three entrances are set in round-arch openings with a fanlight above. The multistage tower has an arched louver above a marble date panel at the second stage, and a clock at the third stage, which is differentiated from the second by rounded corners. The belfry is octagonal, with round-arch louvered openings, and is topped by a smaller octagonal cupola and a short spire.

The church congregation was founded in 1674, when Portland was known as Falmouth, then in the Province of Maine, and its early history was interrupted by Native American attacks. Its period of continuous history begins in 1718, when it began meeting in a log church, which was replaced in 1721 and again in 1740 by frame structures. The latter was where a convention was held to draft the soon-to-be state's first constitution in 1819 (statehood being awarded the following year). This church was built on the site of the 1740 "Old Jerusalem" church, and was the first major granite structure east of Portsmouth, New Hampshire. The building, which reused the tower clock, bell (replaced in 1862) and weathervane from the previous incarnation, was the only one in the surrounding area to survive Portland's great fire of 1866.

A chandelier in the church's interior includes a 12 pounds (5.4 kg) cannonball fired at the building during the British attack on Portland in 1775.

Hermann Kotzschmar (1829–1908) was the church organist for 47 years.

== See also ==
- National Register of Historic Places listings in Portland, Maine
- Thomas Smith (parson), the church's leader from 1727-1795
