= Stephen A. Emery =

American composer and theorist (1841–1891)

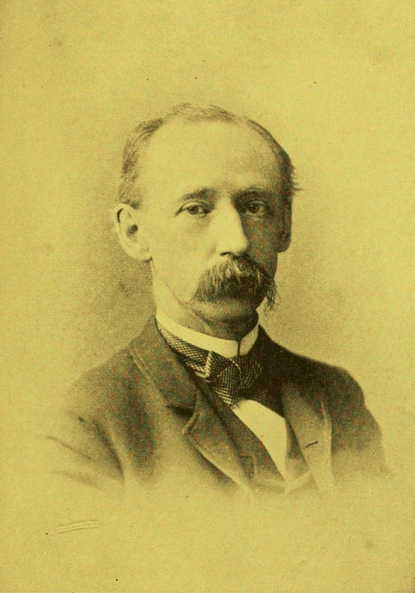
Stephen Albert Emery

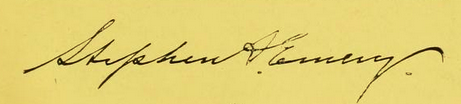
signature

Stephen Albert Emery (October 4, 1841 – 1891) was a 19th-century American music composer and theorist. Many of the younger American composers were indebted to Emery for their instruction in the art of composition, and he stood in the front rank of American theorists. Emery has a national reputation as a lecturer upon musical subjects, a contributor to musical papers, a composer, a teacher of harmony, counterpoint and piano. As a composer, he wrote about a 150 published pieces, all of which were musicianly, and many of which enjoyed a large share of popular favor.

== Early life and education ==
Stephen Albert Emery was born in Paris, Maine on October 4, 1841. His father, Hon. Stephen Emery, was a distinguished lawyer and judge.

Emery early manifested a strong love for music, and he even composed some little pieces before he was able to read notes, an elder sister showing him how to write them. After a common school education, he entered upon a collegiate course at Colby University in the fall of 1859, but owing to ill-health and impaired sight, he was compelled to leave after the freshman year. He, then as a pastime, took up the study of the piano and harmony, his teacher being Henry L. Edwards, of Portland, Maine. Acting upon the advice of his teacher, Emery went to Leipzig in 1862, and there for two years, he studied with Richter, Papperitz, Plaidy and Haupt. In Dresden, he studied under Spindler.

== Career ==
Emery returned to the United States, remaining in Portland until the great fire there in 1866, when he relocated to Boston. He was engaged as teacher of the piano and harmony by Eben Tourjee, at the opening of the New England Conservatory of Music, in 1867, and was afterwards appointed professor of harmony, theory and composition in the Boston University College of Music.

Emery wrote many piano pieces and songs. His Foundation Studies in Pianoforte Playing, Op. 35 (written for his own children), was a remarkably simple and easy course for beginners, while his Elements of Harmony was used throughout the U.S. Emery lectured and composed a considerable quantity of music, both vocal and instrumental. He was equally known as a didactic lecturer and as a teacher. He was also associate editor of the Boston Musical Herald where his editorial contributions exercised a decided influence in elevating the standard of musical taste.

His students included: Horatio Parker, Arthur Foote, Henry Kimball Hadley, Ethelbert Nevin, Nellie Moyer Budd, and Cora S. Briggs.

== Death and legacy ==
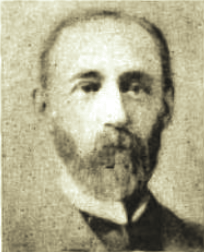
(undated)

Stephen Albert Emergy died in 1891. His papers are held by Yale University.

== Selected piano compositions ==
- Alma Polka
- Among the Islands
- At the Castle
- Crystal Spring
- Petite Fantaisie
- Sonatellas
- No. 1 in E flat
- No. 2 in A
