= Temple Emanu-El of New York (1930) =

Reform synagogue in Manhattan, New York

Temple Emanu-El
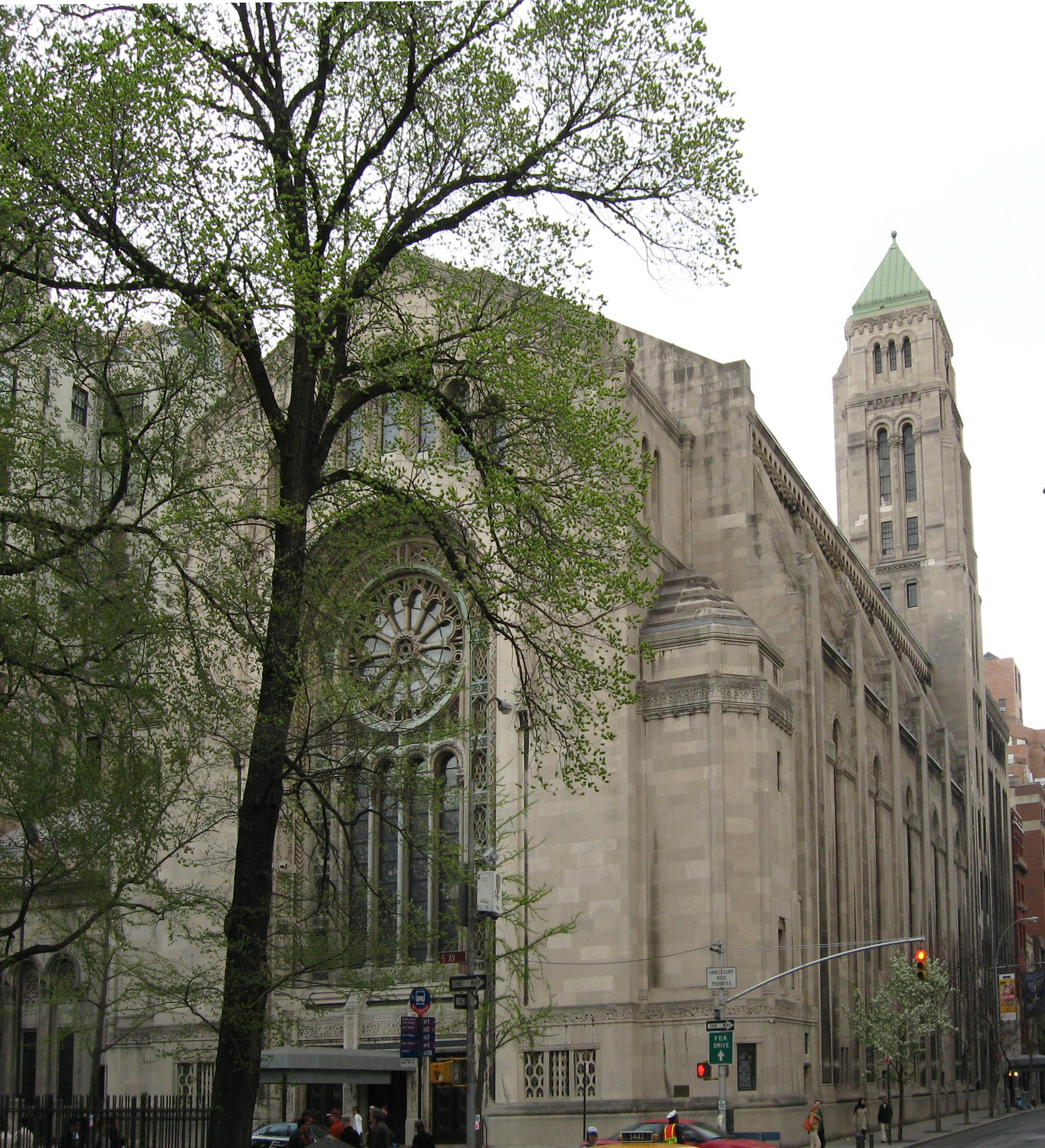
- The synagogue in 2008

- Location in New York City

Religion
- Affiliation: Reform Judaism
- Ecclesiastical or organisational status: Synagogue
- Ownership: Congregation Emanu-El of New York
- Status: Active
- Notable artworks: Mosaics by Hildreth Meière

Location
- Location: 1 East 65th Street
- Municipality: New York City
- State: New York
- Country: United States
- Coordinates: 40°46′05″N 73°58′11″W

Architecture
- Architects: Clarence Stein; Robert D. Kohn; Charles Butler
- Type: Synagogue
- Style: Romanesque Revival; Moorish Revival
- Established: 1845 (as a congregation)
- Completed: 1930
- Capacity: 2,500

Website
- emanuelnyc.org

Temple Emanu-El of New York is a synagogue at 1 East 65th Street on the Upper East Side of Manhattan, at the northeast corner with Fifth Avenue, in New York City, New York, United States. It was built in 1928–1930 for the Reform Jewish Congregation Emanu-El of New York. With capacity for 2,500 seated worshippers, it is one of the largest synagogues in the world.

== History ==
Temple Emanu-El began on April 6, 1845. Initially meeting on the second floor of a building at Grand and Clinton Streets, in 1854 the congregation acquired the 12th Street Baptist Church, built in 1847 on East 12th Street. In 1868, the congregation built the Moorish Revival synagogue at 43rd Street and Fifth Avenue, designed by Leopold Eidlitz. This building was demolished in 1927 before the construction of the new, present synagogue.

In 1929, the congregation moved to its present location at 65th Street and Fifth Avenue, where the Temple building was constructed to designs of Robert D. Kohn (Note: Kohn was working in partnership with Charles Butler and Clarence S. Stein; Mayers, Mauray & Philip consulted.) on the former site of the Mrs. William B. Astor House. The vast load-bearing masonry walls support the steel beams that carry its roof. The hall seats 2,500, larger than St Patrick's Cathedral.

The building was built between 1928 and 1929 and consecrated in 1930. Its style is said by some to be Romanesque Revival — others say Moorish Revival with art deco ornamentation. The mosaics were made by Hildreth Meière (1892–1961).

The building on Fifth Avenue is one of the largest synagogues in the world. In size, it rivals many of the largest European synagogues such as the Grand Choral Synagogue of St. Petersburg, Moscow Choral Synagogue, and the Budapest Great Synagogue. Emanu-El means "God is with us" in Hebrew.

In the building there is a museum with a collection that includes more than 650 pieces that date from the 14th century to the present day, which can be separated into two main categories: History of Emanu-El and Judaica. The museum also has special exhibitions, lectures and tours.

== Beliefs ==
=== Marriage ===
The synagogue has an inclusive vision and celebrates both opposite-sex marriages and same-sex marriages.

== Gallery ==
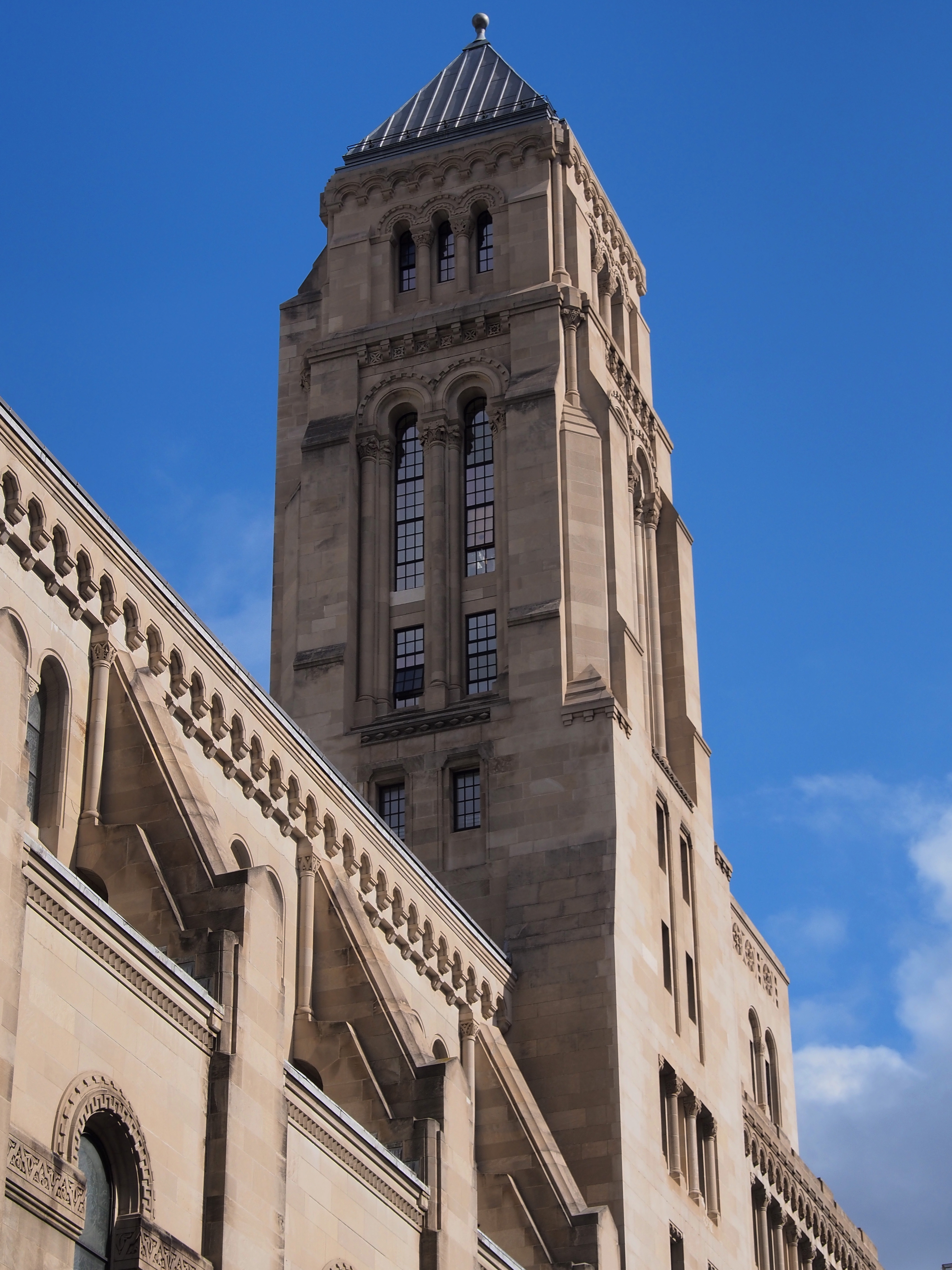

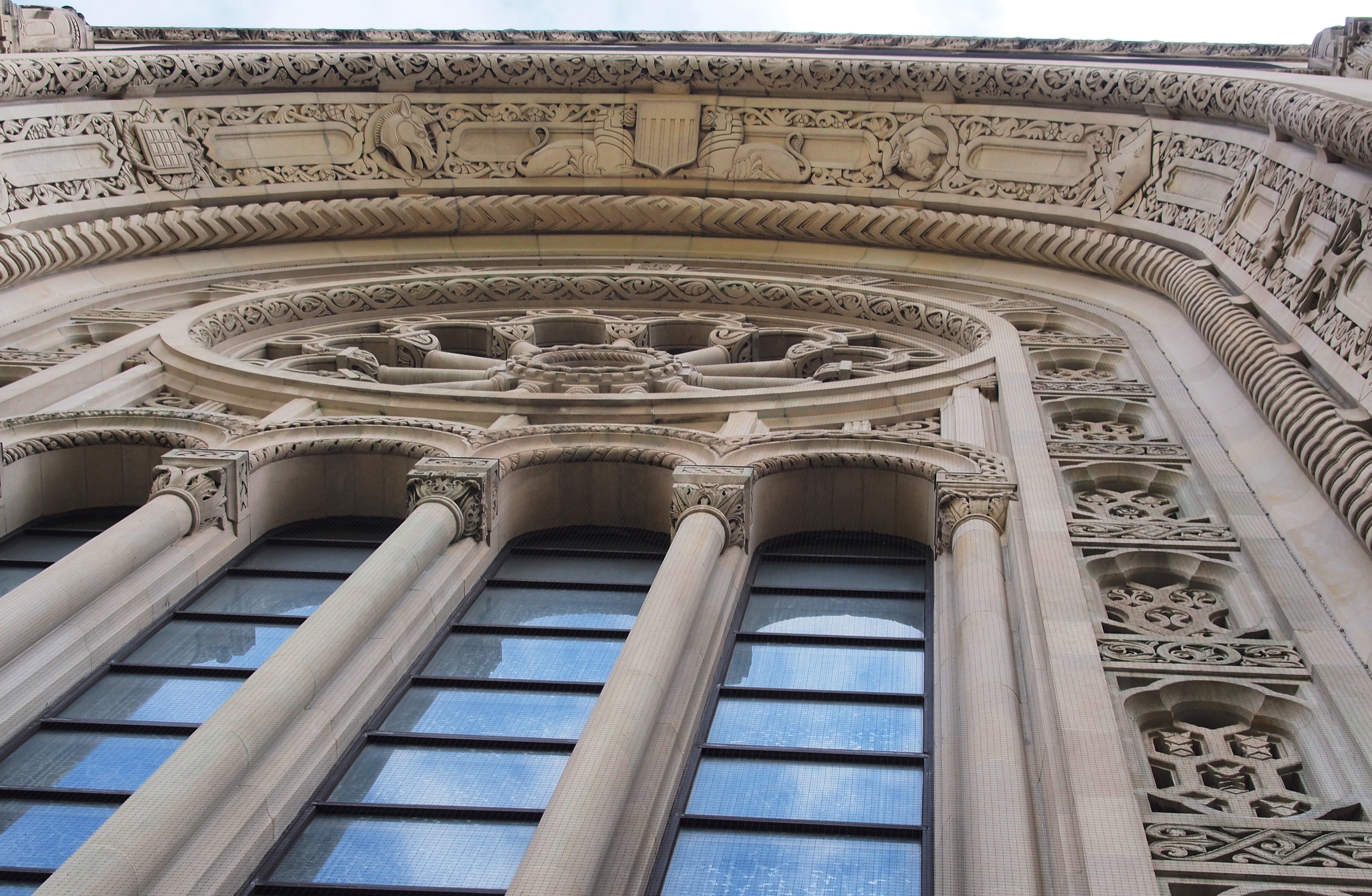

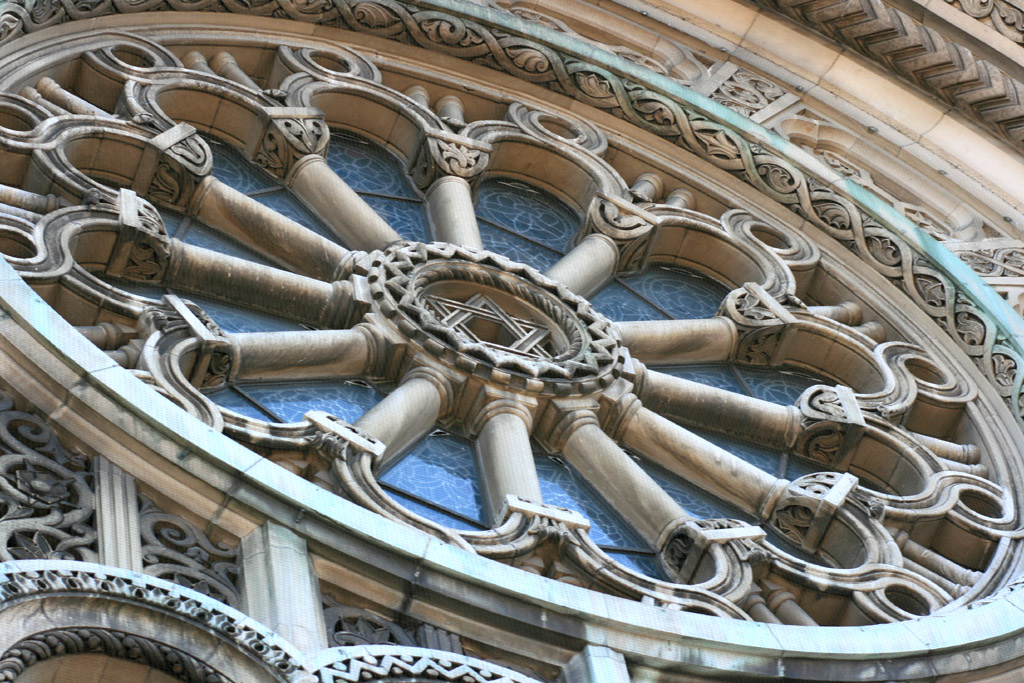

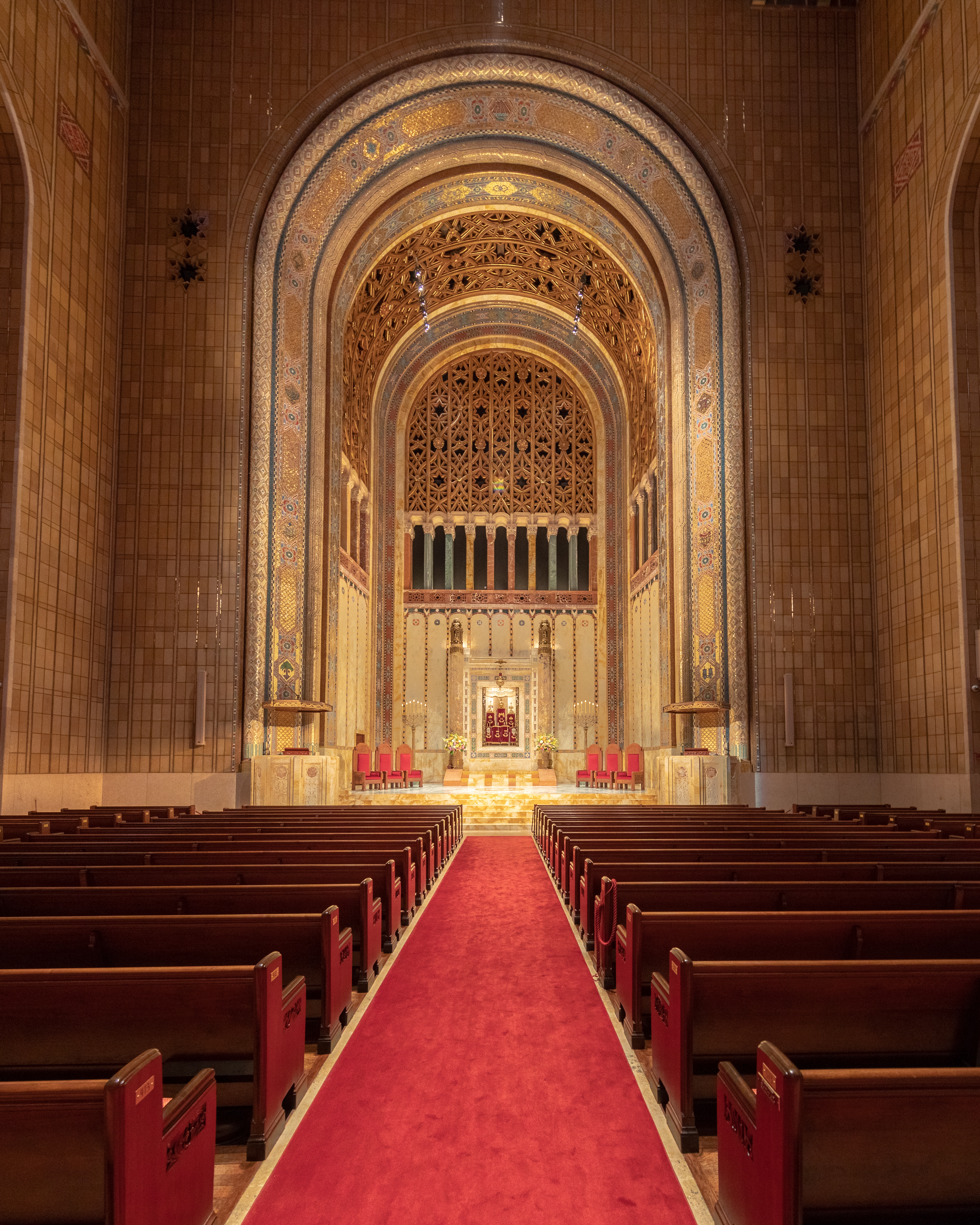

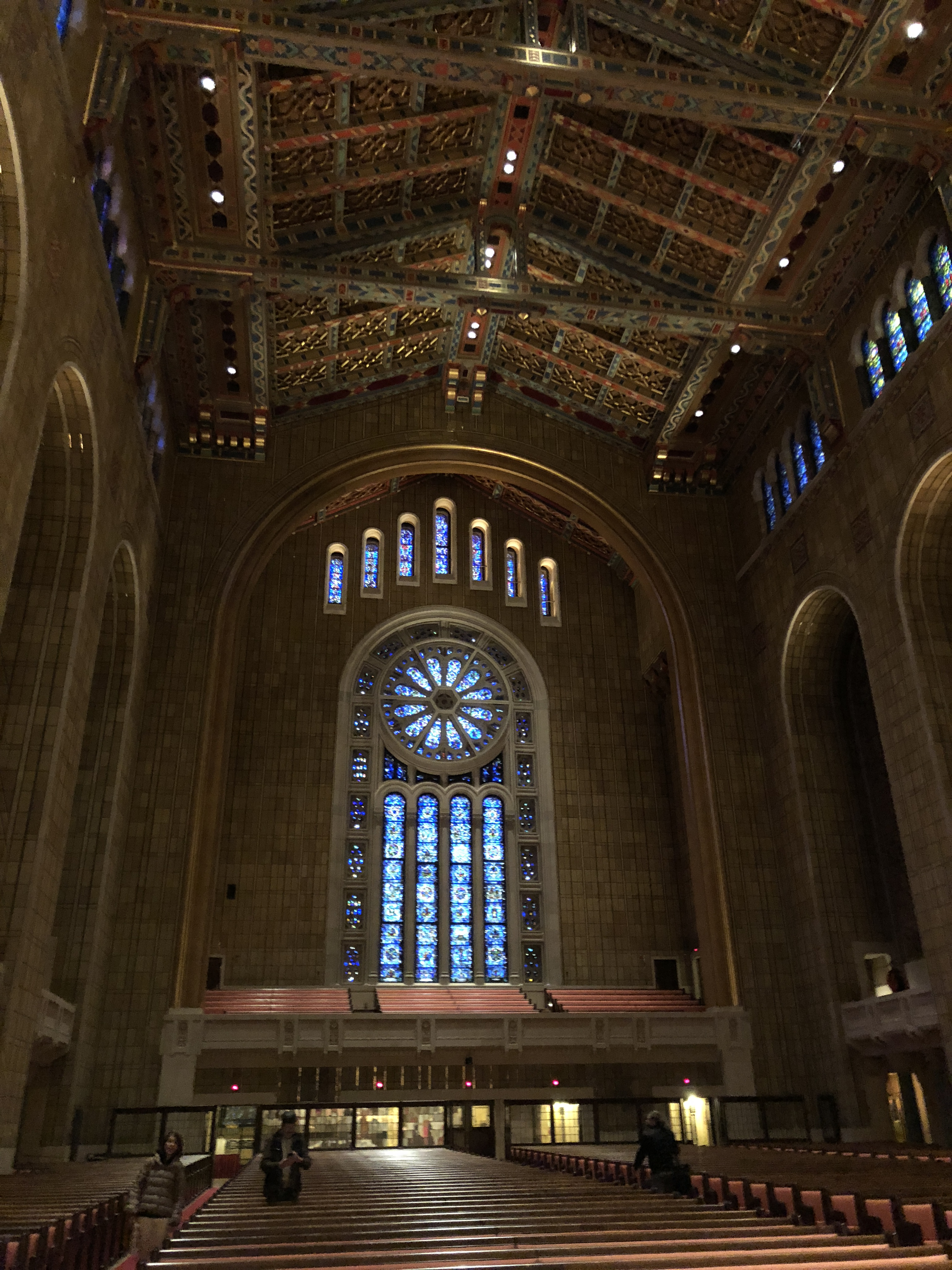

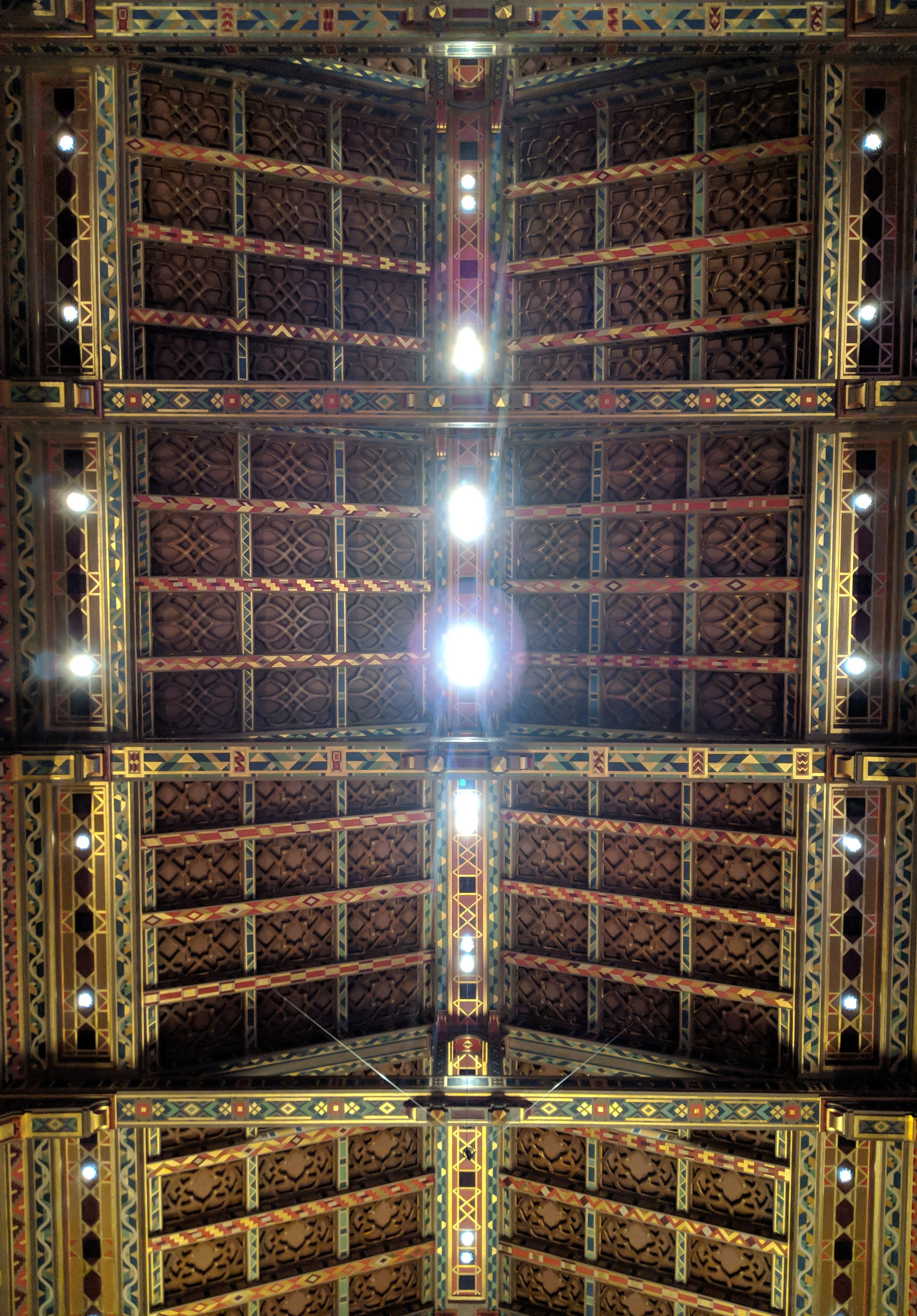

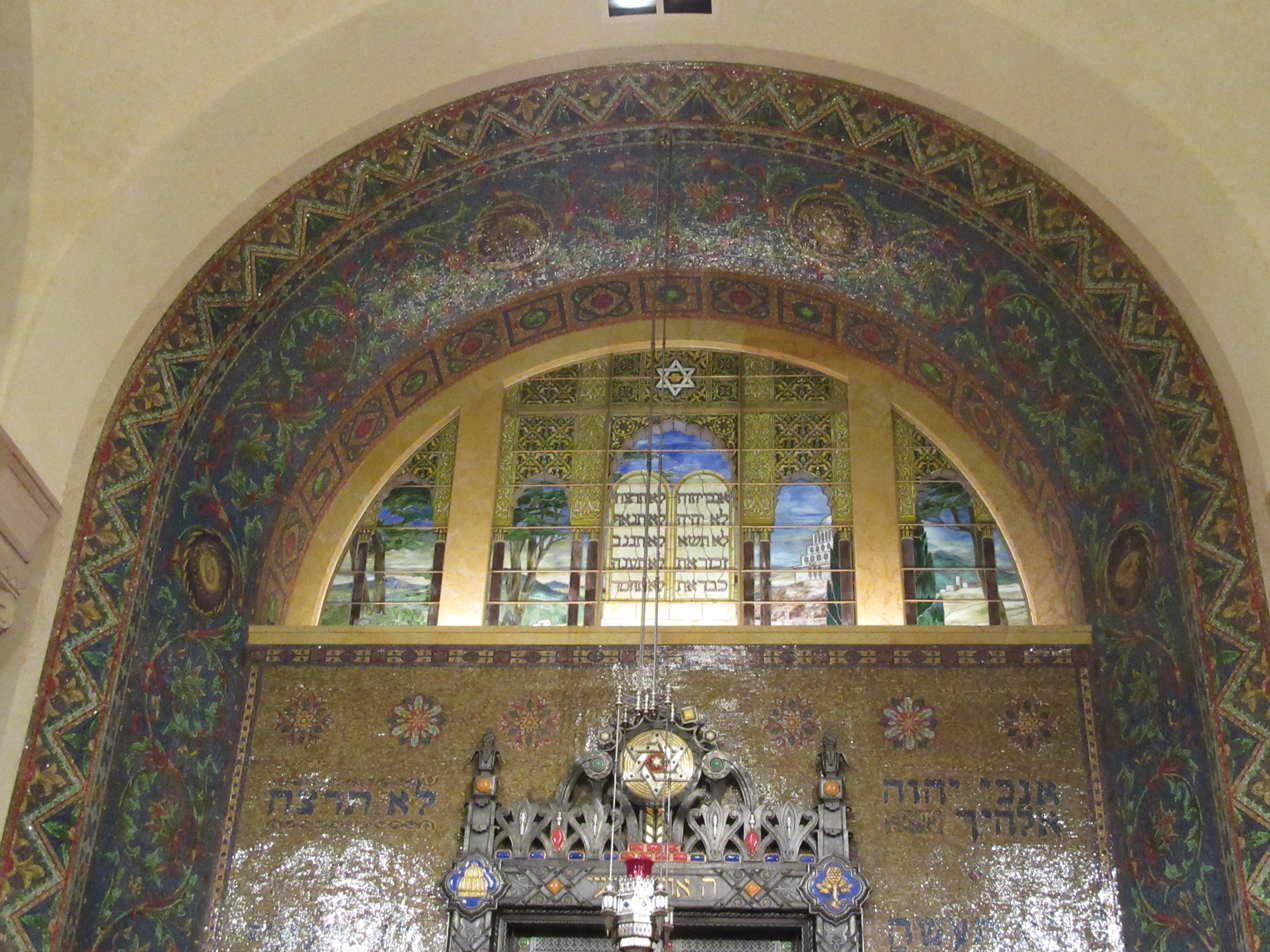

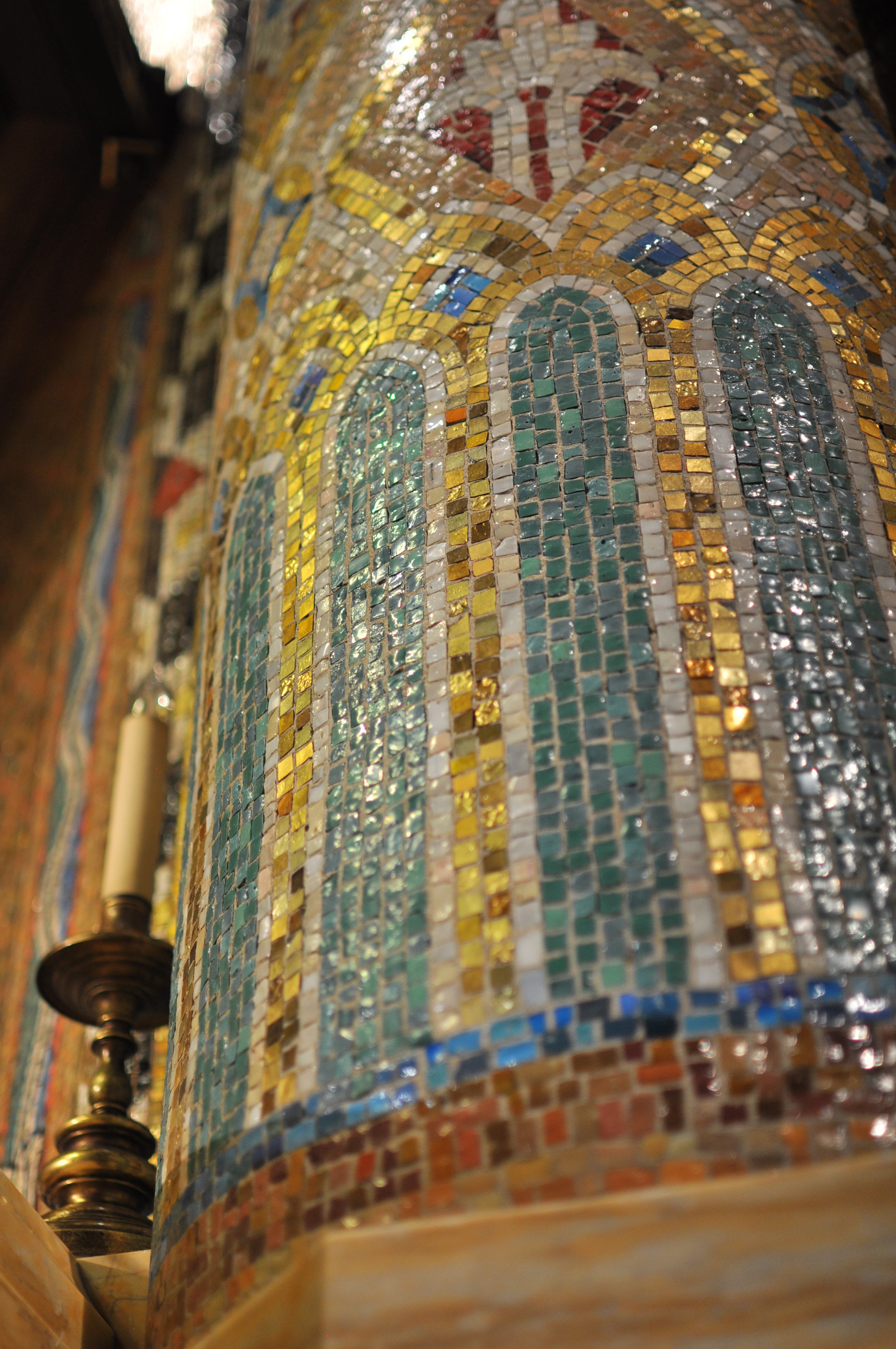

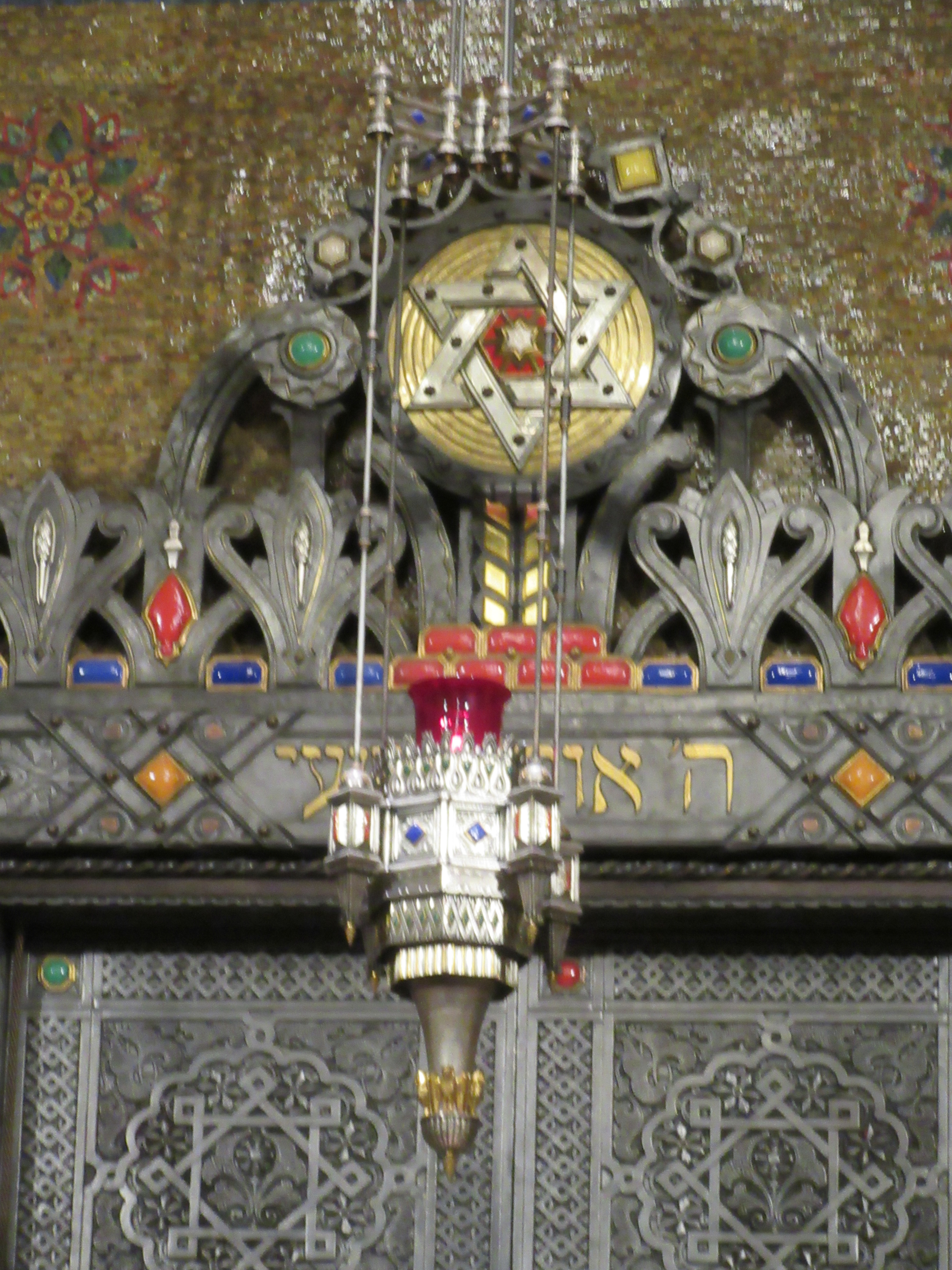

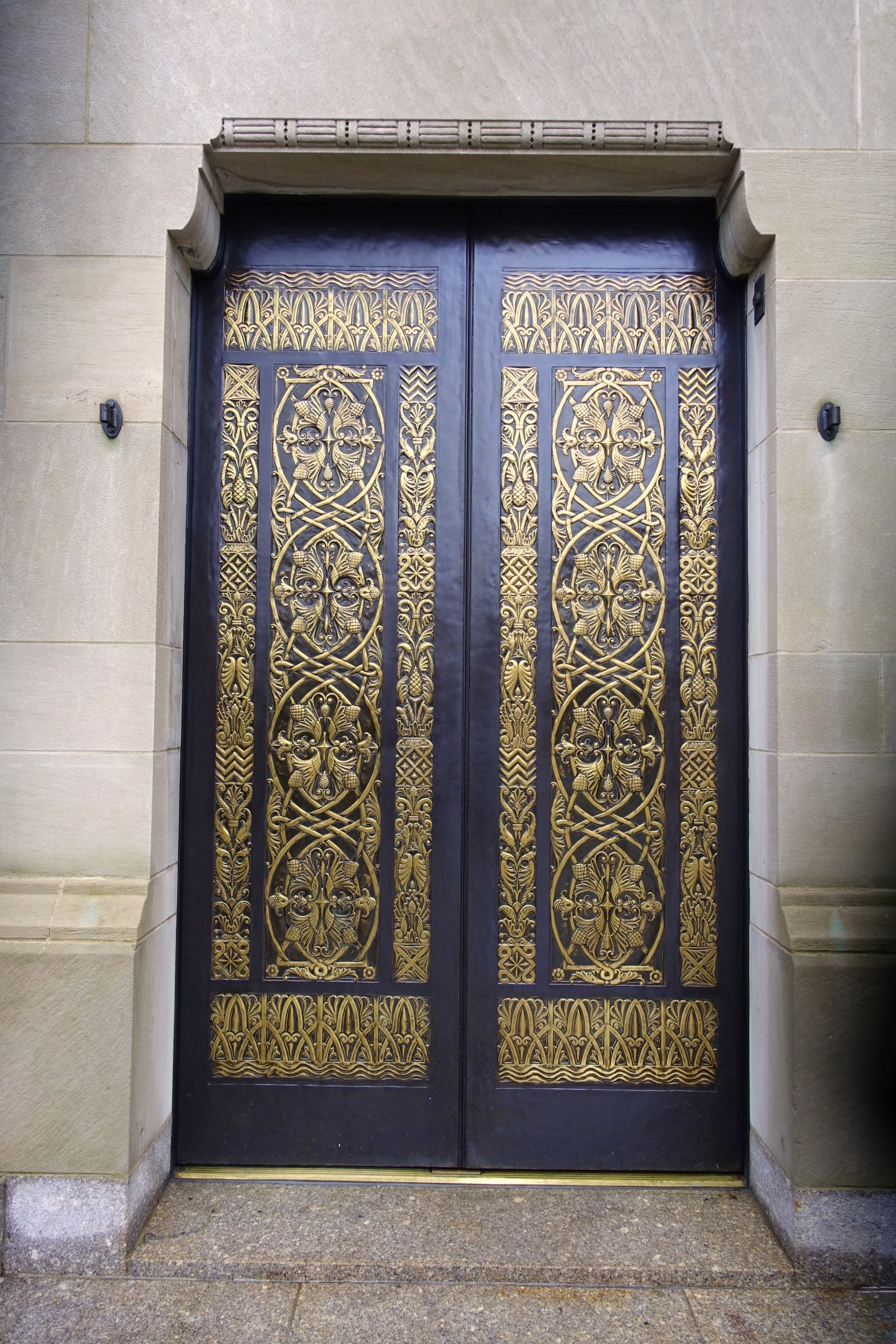

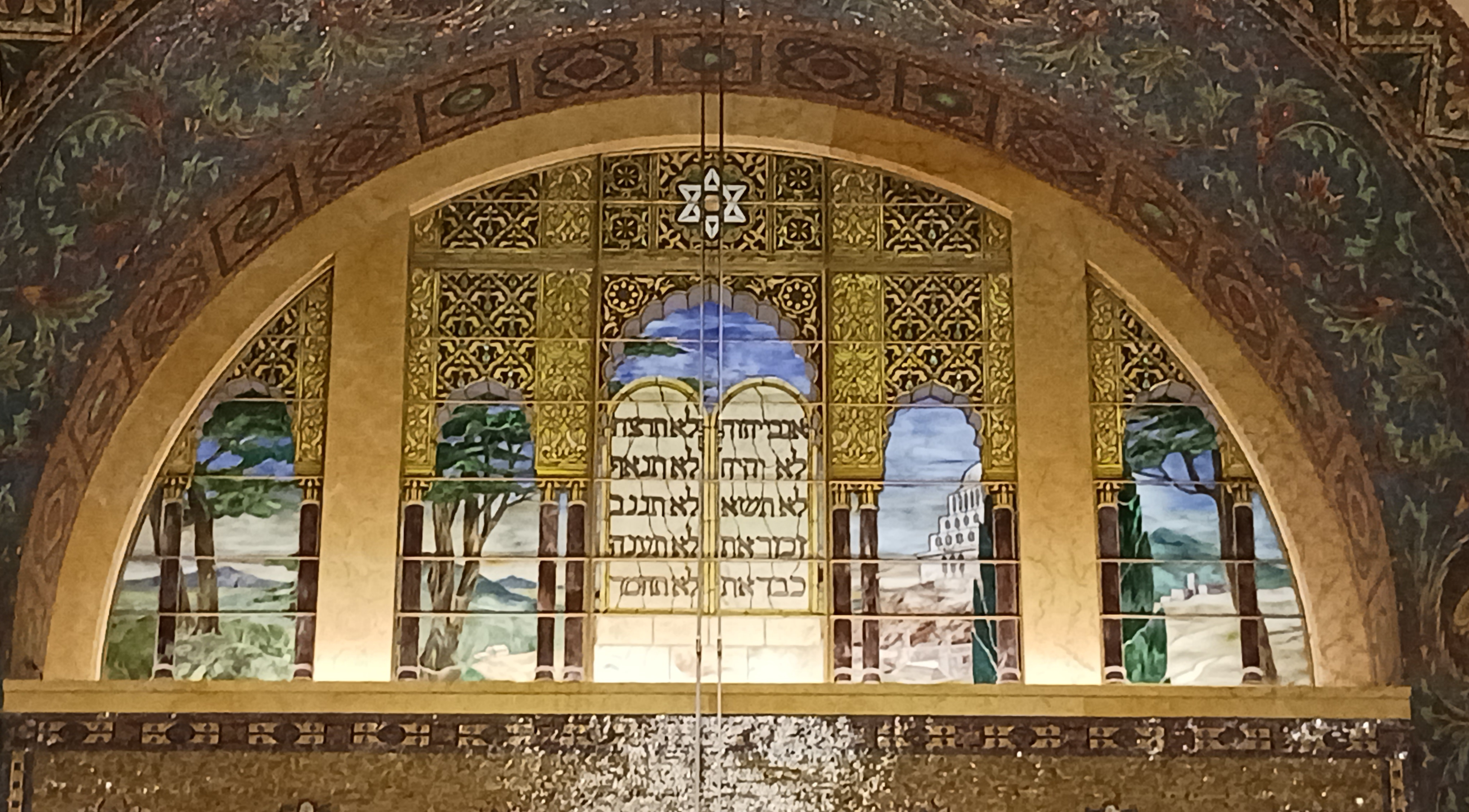
