= Hermann Kotzschmar =

German-American musician, conductor and composer (1829–1908)

- Born: July 4, 1829; Finsterwalde, Kingdom of Prussia
- Died: April 15, 1908 (aged 78); Portland, Maine, U.S.
- Resting place: First Parish Church, Portland, Maine, U.S.
- Occupation: Musician
- Known for: Organist of First Parish Church between 1851 and 1898
- Spouse: Mary Ann Torrey (married 1872–1908; his death)

Johann Carl Hermann Kotzschmar (July 4, 1829 – April 15, 1908) was a German-American musician, conductor, and composer.

Kotzschmar was born in 1829 in Finsterwalde, Kingdom of Prussia. His father, Johann Gottfried Kotzschmar, was the town Stadtmusiker and taught his son to play the violin, keyboard, flute, and horn. At age 14, Kotzschmar went to Dresden to study with Julius Otto, a choral conductor who was the cantor at the Kreuzkirche, Dresden. He studied with Otto for five years, then emigrated to America with a group of other musicians from Dresden who called themselves the Saxonia Band. The group toured New York and Philadelphia with Fry's Italian Opera, then split up when the show folded in Boston.

While in Boston, Kotzschmar met Cyrus Libby Curtis, an amateur musician from Portland, Maine, who suggested he move there to find work. Kotzschmar arrived in Portland in July 1849 and lived with the Curtis family for his first year there. In June 1850, Curtis' first son was born and named Cyrus Hermann Kotzschmar Curtis, in Kotzschmar's honor.

In 1851, Kotzschmar was hired to be the organist at the First Parish Church in Portland, where his ashes are kept. It was a position he would keep for 47 years. While living in Portland, Kotzschmar was very active as a composer, conductor, and performer. As an organist, he was well known for his improvisational skills. He was also a noted pianist and accompanist. He composed music for a variety of instruments and ensembles and in a variety of formats.

In addition to his position at the First Parish Church, Kotzschmar's other major professional collaboration was as the conductor of the Haydn Association. This group of singers first came together in 1869 to present Haydn's Creation. After the success of this performance, they decided to form a permanent group called the Haydn Association or, informally, the Haydns.

In December 1872, Kotzschmar married one of his former piano students, Sacramento native Mary Ann Torrey, on her 19th birthday. The couple had two children: Dorothea and Hermann Jr. Mary published Half-hour Lessons in Music: Class Work for Beginners at Piano in 1907.

In 1898, Kotzschmar left his positions at both the First Parish Church and the Haydn Association. He took a position at the State Street Congregational Church and worked there until 1903.

== Death ==
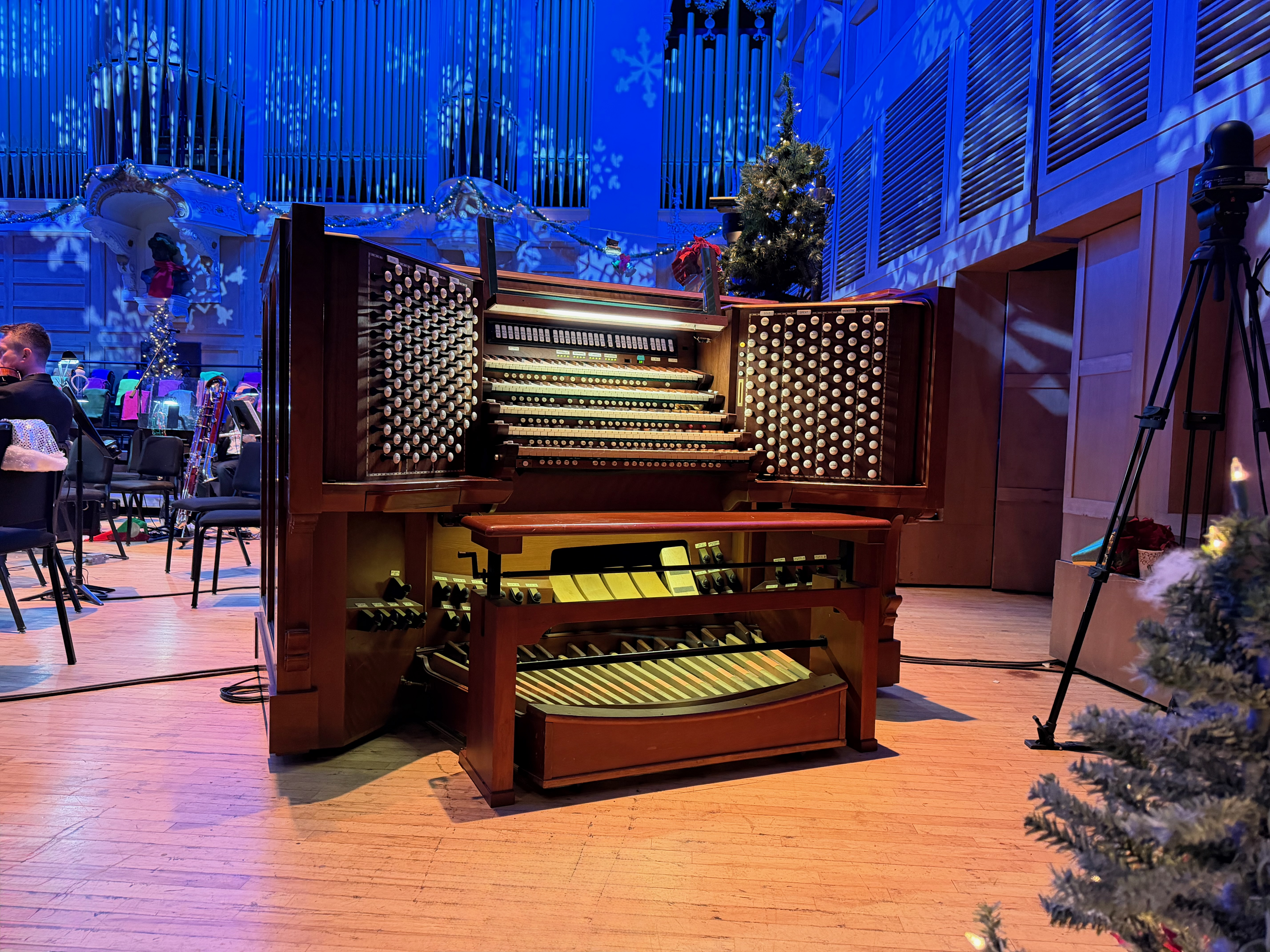
The Kotzschmar Memorial Organ at Merrill Auditorium, Portland, Maine

Hermann Kotzschmar died in Portland in 1908, at the age of 78, from a cerebral hemorrhage. Earlier that year, a fire had destroyed Portland City Hall. When a new city hall was built, Cyrus Hermann Kotzschmar Curtis, having become a wealthy publisher, donated an organ for an auditorium in the building, on the condition that it be a memorial to Hermann Kotzschmar. The Kotzschmar Memorial Organ was dedicated on August 22, 1912. His widow survived him by 29 years. She is interred in Portland's Eastern Cemetery.

=== Legacy ===
Hermann Kotzchamar's legacy includes two students who left an indelible mark on American music and music education: John Knowles Paine, American's first composer of large scale orchestral works and America's first music professor, and Cyrus H. K. Curtis, who, having become one of America's richest men publishing magazines including the Ladies' Home Journal and The Saturday Evening Post, became a music philanthropist who donated several important organs, funded the early Philadelphia Orchestra, and provided, through his daughter's memorial gifts, the Curtis Institute of Music.

His other student includes Cora S. Briggs.
