= Parson Smith House =

Historic house in Maine, United States

- U.S. National Register of Historic Places
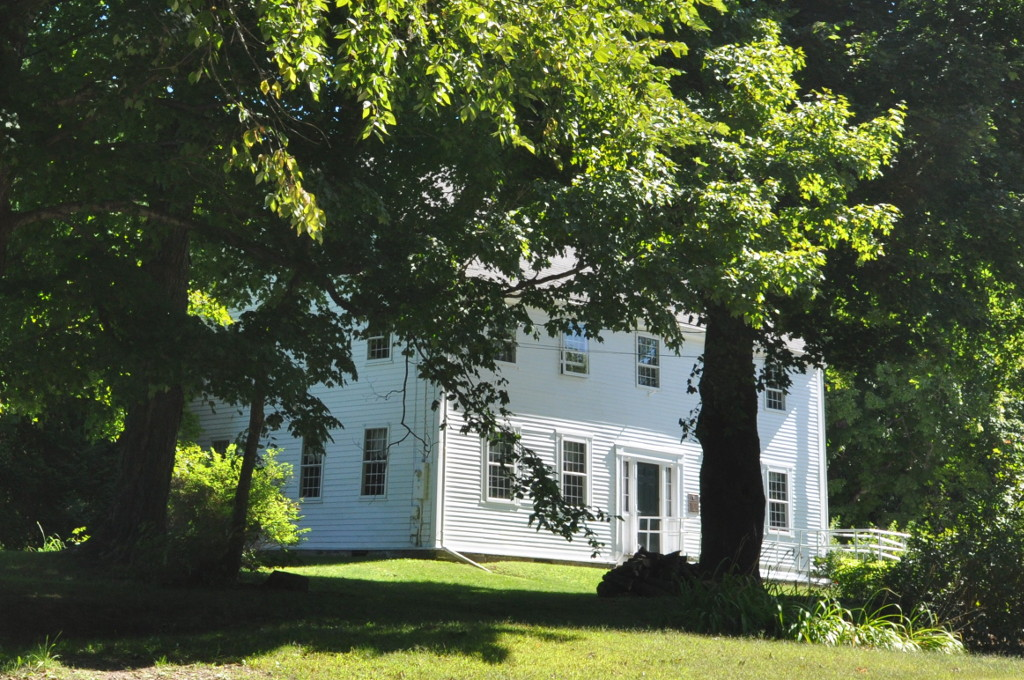

- Location within Maine Location within the United States
- Nearest city: South Windham, Maine
- Coordinates: 43°42′58″N 70°23′33″W
- Area: 5 acres (2.0 ha)
- Built: 1764
- Architectural style: Colonial
- NRHP reference No.: 73000237
- Added to NRHP: July 16, 1973

The Parson Smith House is a historic house on River Road in southern Windham, Maine. Built in 1764 and virtually unaltered since, it is one of the state's finest examples of Colonial Georgian architecture. It was listed on the National Register of Historic Places in 1973. Now a private residence, it was for 40 years a historic house museum owned and operated by the Society for the Preservation of New England Antiquities.

== Description and history ==
The Parson Smith House is located on the east side of River Road in southernmost Windham, just north of its junction with Anderson Road. It is set at the top of a rise, overlooking former farmlands (now partly wooded) of the old Maplewood Farm property. The house is a 2 1/2-story wood-frame structure, five bays wide, with a side-gable roof, two end chimneys, and clapboard siding. The main entrance is framed by sidelight windows and molded trim, the latter also surrounding the building's sash windows. Nearly all of the building's interior features are of 18th century origin, excepting some 19th-century fireplace mantels. There are wall sections that have fragments of early wallpaper. An ell, probably of mid-19th century origin, extends to the rear.

The house was built in 1764 by Parson Peter Thatcher Smith, the son of Rev. Thomas Smith, Windham's first settled Congregational minister. It was built on the "ministerial lot", set aside by the town founders for the benefit of the minister. The house remained in the hands of Smith descendants (often descending through the female line with changes of last name), until 1952, when it was bequeathed to the Society for the Preservation of New England Antiquities (SPNEA, known as Historic New England). SPNEA operated the house as a museum, open to the public, until 1991. It then sold the property into private ownership, with preservation covenants restricting interior and exterior alterations.

== See also ==
- National Register of Historic Places listings in Cumberland County, Maine
