= Thomas Smith (parson) =

Thomas Smith (March 10, 1701 – 1795) was an American religious leader, real estate speculator, physician, and advocate for ethnic genocide against the Penobscot people. Smith was the parson for the First Parish Church in Falmouth (now Portland, Maine) from 1727 until his death in 1795. While in this position, he engaged in the genocidal murder of Penobscot people between the Kennebec and Penobscot rivers. His actions led to significant personal fortune while also severely weakening the Wabanaki Confederacy. During the 21st-century, his former church has publicly sought to reckon with their congregation's role in the genocide.

In 1755, Spencer Phips, lieutenant governor of the Province of Massachusetts Bay, issued a proclamation that declared the Penobscot people enemies, rebels, and traitors to King George II, and called on all "his Majesty’s Subjects of this Province to Embrace all opportunities of pursuing, captivating, killing, and Destroying all and every of the aforesaid Indians." This served as the catalyst for the genocide committed by Smith and others in colonial Maine.

== Personal ==
Born in Boston on March 10, 1701, he was the son of a merchant by the same name. He enrolled at Harvard College in 1716 at the age of 15 and studied Hebrew.

Smith was married three times throughout his life. He married his first wife, Sarah Tyng, who was the daughter of Col. Jonathan Tyng in 1728. The couple had 8 children before her death on October 1, 1742. She died less than a month after giving birth to their final child, who was born on September 6 and died 8 days later on September 14. Approximately 5 months later, he married a widow with the last name of Jordan who was from Saco, Maine on March 1, 1743. Jordan died on January 3, 1763. He married again on August 10, 1768, to Elizabeth Wendall, who was also a widow. He had no children with either his second or third wives.

The home of his son, known as the Parson Smith House in Windham, Maine, has been listed on the National Register of Historic Places since 1973. In 1821, his papers were published under the title Extracts from the Journals Kept by the Rev. Thomas Smith: Late Pastor of the First Church of Christ in Falmouth, in the County of York, (now Cumberland,) from the Year 1720, to the Year 1788, with an Appendix, Containing a Variety of Other Matters.
