= Merrill Auditorium =

Auditorium in Portland, Maine

- Portland City Hall Auditorium
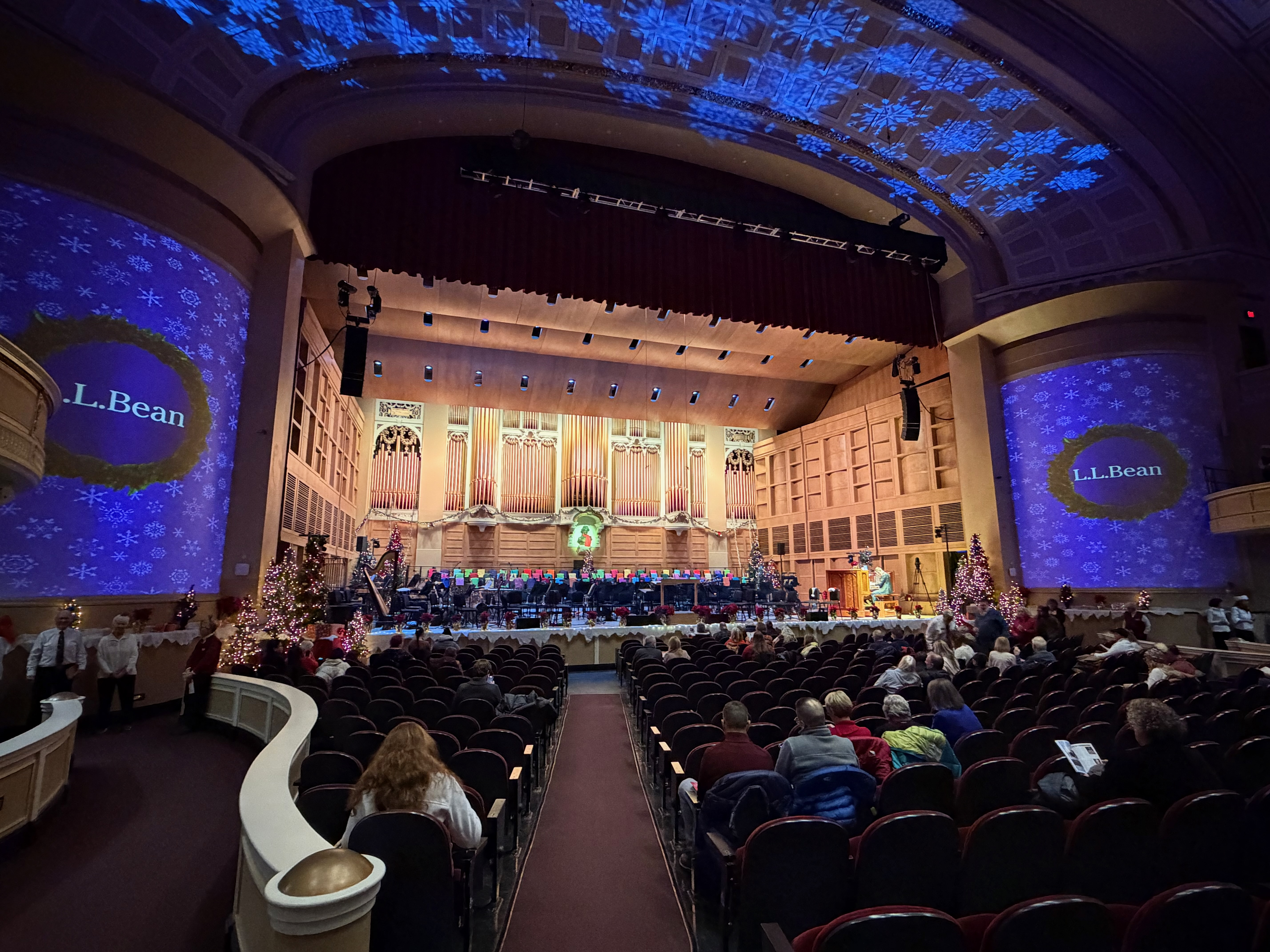
- Pictured in 2025. The Kotzschmar Memorial Organ is on the right of the stage

- Interactive map of
- Address: 20 Myrtle St. Portland, Maine; United States
- Coordinates: 43°39′34″N 70°15′26″W
- Owner: City of Portland
- Capacity: 1,908

Construction
- Opened: 1912
- Rebuilt: 1997

Website
- Merrill Auditorium

Merrill Auditorium is a 1,908-seat auditorium located in Portland, Maine, United States. Originally known as Portland City Hall Auditorium, it is located in the eastern section of Portland City Hall.

The auditorium was built in 1912 and underwent a major rebuild and renovation in 1997. It features a large pipe organ, the Hermann Kotzschmar Memorial Organ, donated by Cyrus Curtis and built by the Austin Organ Company (Opus 323). It was renamed in the 1990s following a bequest from Paul and Virginia Merrill which allowed the facility to be renovated.

Prime tenants at Merrill are the Portland Symphony Orchestra, Portland Ovations and the Friends of the Kotzschmar Organ. Resident organizations include the Maine State Ballet, Portland Ballet and Opera Maine.
