= Kotzschmar Memorial Organ =

Pipe organ in Portland, Maine

Coordinates: 43°39′34″N 70°15′26″W

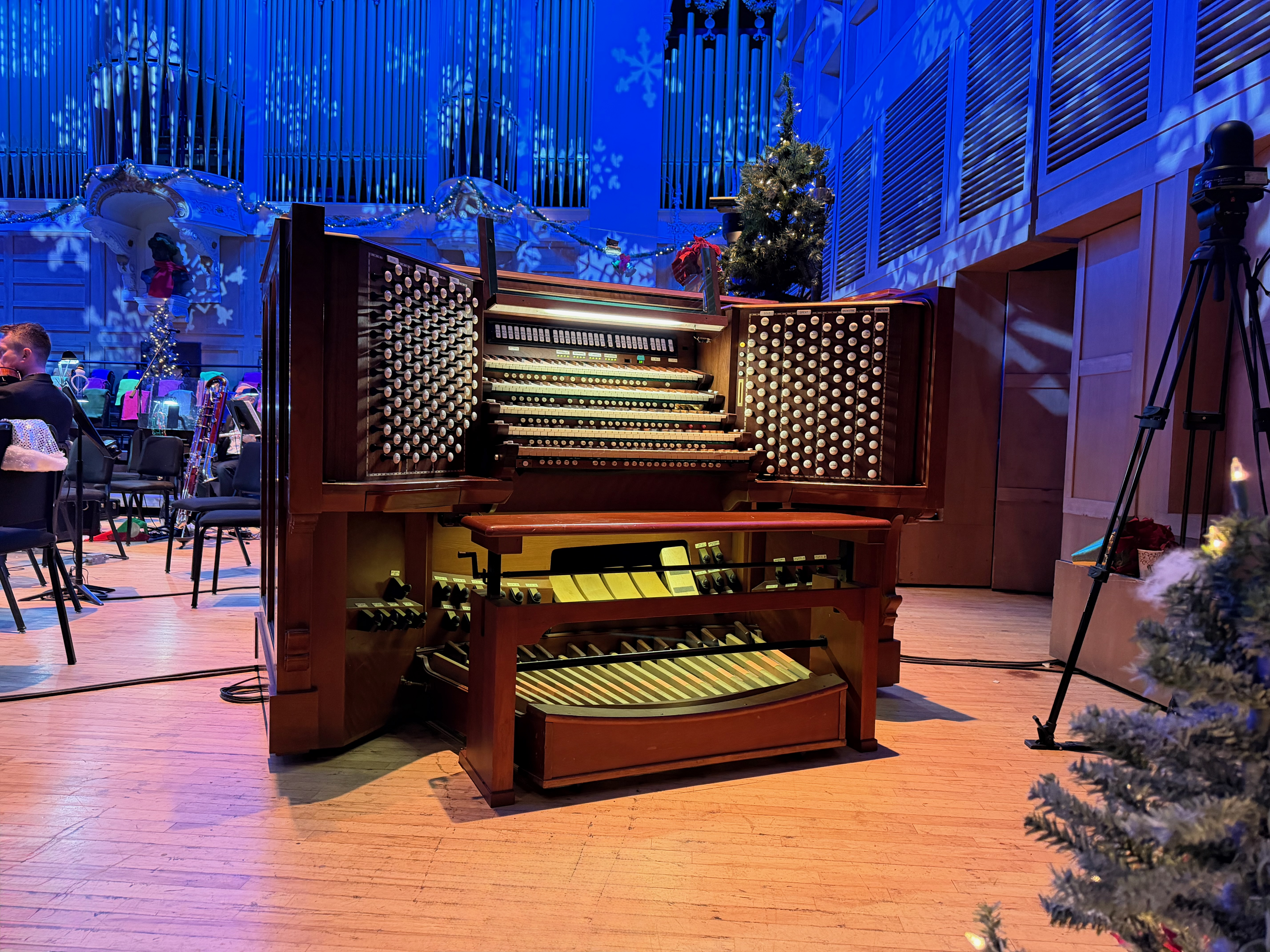
Pictured in 2025

The Kotzschmar Memorial Organ, usually referred to as the Kotzschmar Organ, is a pipe organ located at Merrill Auditorium in the City Hall of Portland, Maine, United States.

== History ==
Built in 1911 by the Austin Organ Co. as Opus 323, the Kotzschmar Organ was the second-largest organ in the world at the time, and it remains the largest organ in Maine today.

The organ was donated to the city by Portland native Cyrus Hermann Kotzschmar Curtis, founder of the Curtis Publishing Company of Philadelphia, as a memorial to Hermann Kotzschmar, a close family friend for whom he had been named. Kotzschmar was a German-born musician who came to Portland in 1849, acquired a reputation as the city's most prominent musician, and lived there until his death in 1908.

The Kotzschmar Organ is a prime example of the U.S. style of municipal (city–owned) organs which were once a prevalent part of American culture throughout the first half of the 20th century. It was the first municipal organ built in the U.S., and is one of only two U.S. municipal organs still owned by a municipality – the other being the Spreckels Organ in San Diego, California.

== Organists ==
=== Municipal organists ===
The City of Portland created the position of Municipal Organist in 1912. The position was maintained until 1981 when it was eliminated due to budget constraints. That same year a non-profit organization called Friends of the Kotzschmar Organ was formed in order to provide continued funding for a municipal organist (who would become an FOKO employee), as well as to fund maintenance and restoration of the organ.

To date, there have been eleven municipal organists in Portland:

- Will C. Macfarlane, 1912–1919
- Irvin John [James] Morgan, 1919–1921
- Edwin H. Lemare, 1921–1923
- Charles Raymond Cronham, 1924–1932
- Alfred Brinkler, 1935–1952
- John E. Fay, 1952–1976
- Douglas Rafter, 1976–1981
- Gerald McGee, 1983–1988
- Earl Miller, 1988–1989
- Ray Cornils, 1990–2017
- James Kennerley, 2018–present

=== Visiting organists ===
A partial list of notable organists who have played the Kotzschmar Memorial Organ:

- E. Power Biggs
- Joseph Bonnet
- Cameron Carpenter
- Ken Cowan
- Virgil Fox
- Felix Hell
- Thomas Heywood
- Dennis James
- Olivier Latry
- Ben van Oosten
- John Scott
- Frederick Swann
- Gillian Weir
- Carol Williams
- Berj Zamkochian
