= Austin Organs =

Austin Organs, Inc.
- Industry: pipe organs
- Founded: 1898
- Founder: John T. Austin
- Headquarters: Hartford, Connecticut, USA
- Key people: Michael B. Fazio (President), Richard G. Taylor (CEO)
- Owner: private partnership
- Website: austinorgans.com

Austin Organs, Inc., is a manufacturer of pipe organs based in Hartford, Connecticut. The company is one of the oldest continuously-operating organ manufacturers in the United States.

== History ==
The first instruments were built in 1893 with the Austin Patent Airchest, and many remain in fine playing condition to this day. The Austin Organ Company was formally organized in 1898 by John Turnell Austin in Boston, Massachusetts, although it traces its beginning to 1893 with the first instruments Austin built at the Clough & Warren Company in Detroit, Michigan. In 1899 the company moved to Hartford.

Austin was from England and had come to the United States in 1889. Austin's father Jonathan had a hobby of organ building. When son John made his way to Detroit he found work at the Farrand & Votey Organ Company. While servicing organs for Farrand, Austin worked with tracker and slider chests and some of the nascent electric mechanisms. He developed what would be named the "Universal Air Chest System". This is an airtight chamber with the chest action on the ceiling of the chamber. A feature of this system was that the chest could be entered from below while the organ was turned on; this allowed for servicing of the organ keying action. The modern (current) chest design was further developed in 1913, and has been refined over the years. In 1905 the company began building electric consoles; these have also been refined over the years.

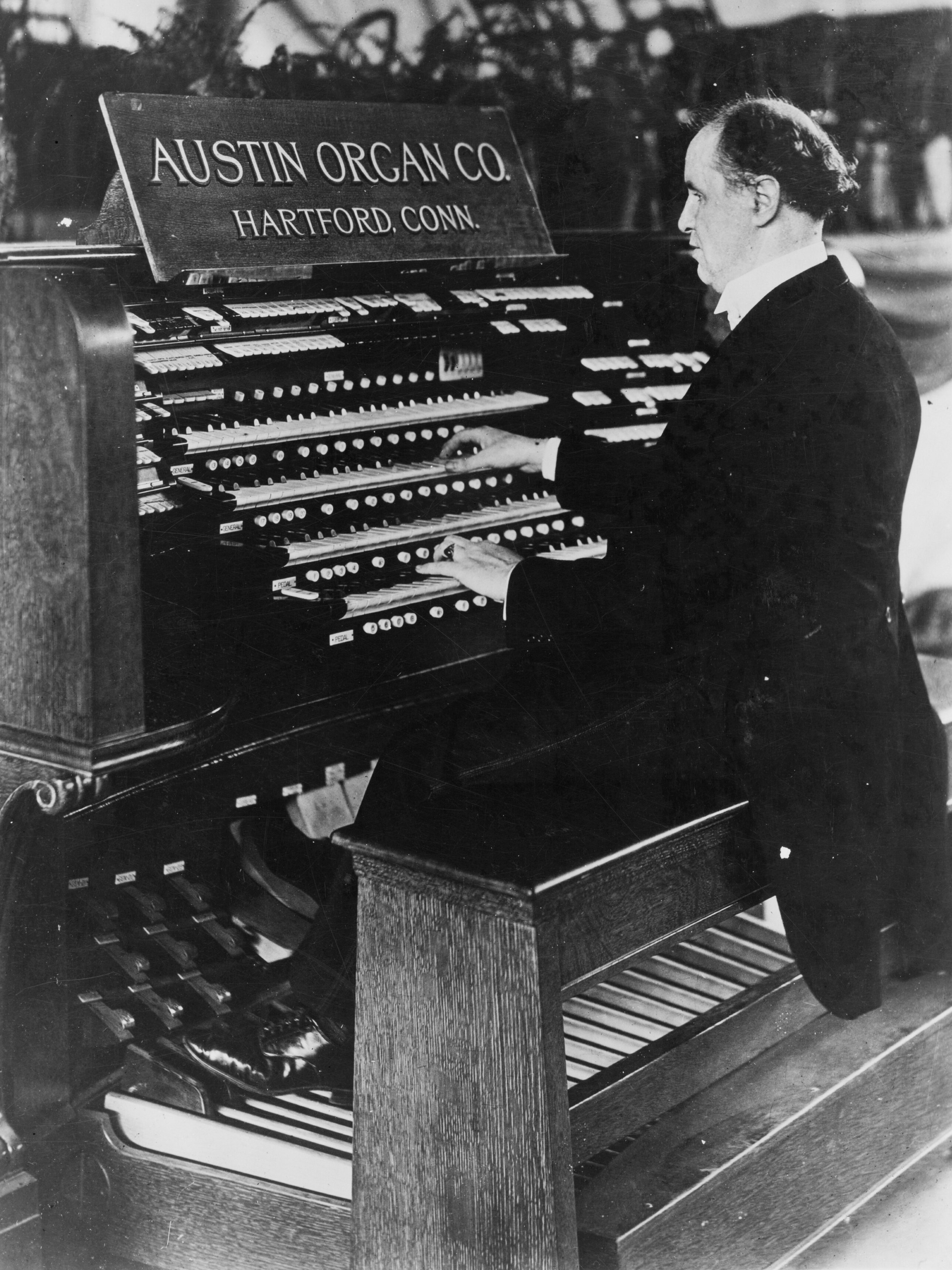
An Austin Organ played by C. Walter Wallace, blind organist inside auditorium at the Sesquicentennial International Exposition, Philadelphia, 1926

The Austin Organ Company reached its peak in the 1920s when it was delivering more than 80 instruments each year. In the Depression years the company struggled with high overhead, decreased new business, and cash flow. By 1935 the company announced that it would close after fulfilling existing contracts, with its last instrument as Opus 1885. The company vacated its factory building, sold some assets and put others into storage.

In February 1937 the nephew of the company founder and a long-term employee purchased what remained of the company and formed "Austin Organs, Inc." They re-established the factory in Hartford although in more modest facilities that were adjacent to their old plant. The first instrument produced by the re-organized company was given Opus 2000. During the Second World War, the company contributed to the war effort by constructing gliders. As of 2020 the company still builds instruments at the same four-story edifice located at 156 Woodland Street.

In March 2005 the company closed when annual revenue fell below $150K per year after a payment dispute regarding an installation. Weeks later a business partnership was formed by the owner of an organ service and repair company and a long-time Austin employee. They purchased the company, restructured its operations, and recalled several company veterans. As of 2019 Austin was building eight new instruments per year. Over 2600 organs have been built with the Austin nameplate.

== Selected installations ==
- Opus 2 – Sweetest Heart of Mary Roman Catholic Church (Detroit, Michigan), 1894. The oldest Austin in existence. As of 2022 reported as "needs attention, but in usable condition".
- Opus 25 – Rushden Baptist Church, Northamptonshire, United Kington, 1897. The two manual, 14 rank instrument was moved to the what is now the Park Road Baptist Church in 1901. Reported to be good condition and in regular use as of 2018, making this the only surviving instrument from Austin's year based in Boston.
- Opus 167 – St. John the Baptist Roman Catholic Church (Manayunk, Philadelphia, Pennsylvania), 1906.
- Opus 265 – The Lodge at the Regency Center, San Francisco, 1909. Originally built for the Scottish Rite Freemasons, the facility is now an event space. In 2009 the two manual, 24 rank organ was listed as available for use but in July 2020 the status of the organ was not listed.
- Opus 301 – Immanuel Baptist Church (Scranton, Pennsylvania), 1910. Now the Houlihan-McLean Center at the University of Scranton. In 2005 the four manual, 45 rank instrument was restored and the console modernized.
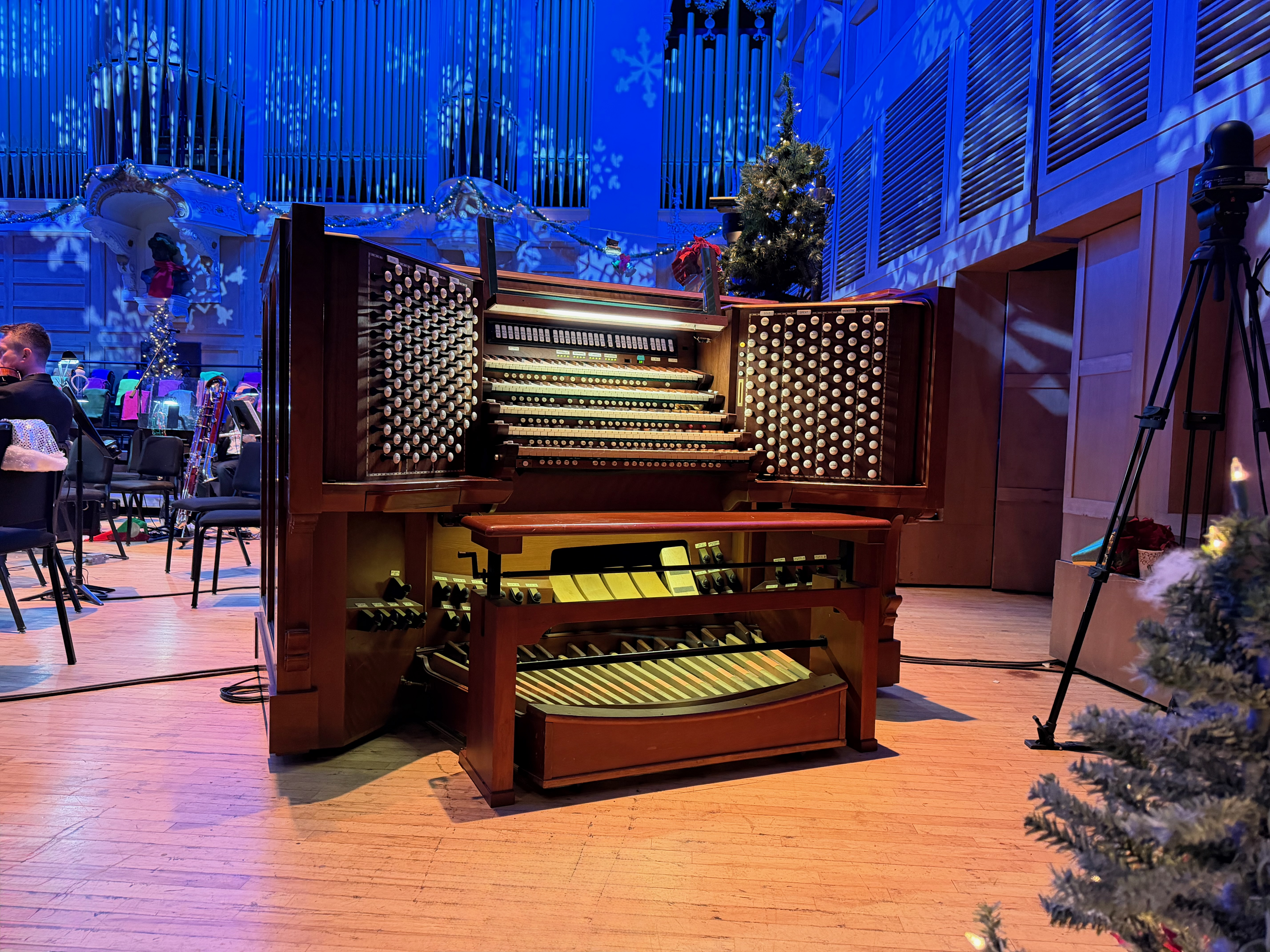
  Kotzschmar Memorial Organ, 2025
- Opus 323 – Kotzschmar Memorial Organ, Portland City Hall Auditorium, (now Merrill Auditorium), Portland, Maine, 1912. Restored 2012-2014.
- Opus 453 – Spreckels Pavilion Organ, Balboa Park, San Diego, California, 1914. The four manual, 46 rank instrument plays in the open air when in use. Renovated in 1993 with changes from its original state. Used for about 62 performances each year.
- Opus 464 – Cathedral of Saints Peter and Paul (Providence, Rhode Island), 1914. 3 Manual, 31 stop gallery organ and a 2 manual, 17 stop Chancel Organ. Replaced in 1972 by a 4 manual, 126 rank Casavant, Opus 3145.
- Opus 490 – St. Michael's Roman Catholic Church, Convent, Rectory, and School, Providence, Rhode Island. Circa 1915. Condition Unknown.
- Opus 500 – Panama–Pacific International Exposition Organ, San Francisco, California, 1915. The four manual, 121 rank instrument was originally installed in Festival Hall of the exposition then relocated to what is now the Bill Graham Civic Auditorium in 1917. Heavily damaged in the 1989 Loma Prieta earthquake, the instrument was shipped to Austin for restoration. The space occupied by the organ was re-purposed and the instrument was not re-installed. As of July 2023 it was listed with a Maine-based instrument broker, free of charge, provided that the new owner would keep it "...intact and historically whole."
- Opus 591 – Calvinistic Congregational Church (now Casa De Gracia y Restauración) Fitchburg, Massachusetts, 1915. As of May 2018 the condition of the three manual, 38 rank instrument was reported as unknown.
- Opus 681 – Ninth Church of Christ, Scientist (now Christ Church), Chicago, Illinois, 1915. Three manuals, 47 ranks. Fate unknown after a 2022 major renovation.
- Opus 770 – University United Methodist Church (Originally University Methodist Episcopal Church), Salina, Kansas, 1917. Originally three manuals, 13 ranks. Rebuilt and expanded to 21 ranks by another builder in 1990. In use as of 2018.
- Opus 844 – Trinity United Methodist Church (originally Trinity Methodist Church), Kansas City, Missouri, 1919. Three manuals, 23 ranks.
- Opus 913 – Bohemian Grove, a campground near Monte Rio, California, 1920. Organ plays outdoors when in use. As of May 2018 the condition of the three manual, 28 rank instrument was reported as unknown.
- Opus 1028 – St. Joseph of the Holy Family – Harlem, New York City, c. 1922. Two manuals, 13 ranks. Condition unknown as of 2018.
- Opus 1167 – Lewis and Clark High School, Spokane, Washington, 1924. Four manual, 34 rank orchestral organ and the largest civic organ west of the Mississippi River at the time of its construction. Rebuilt and upgraded in 2002.
- Opus 1206 – Soldiers and Sailors Memorial Auditorium, Chattanooga, Tennessee, 1924. Installed in 1924 at a cost of $50,000 in Memorial Auditorium, the organ contains 81 ranks and originally had 5,261 pipes. It was restored over a 21 years long process by the Chattanooga Music Club from 1986 to 2007 and was first played in its restored form on July 2, 2007. The organ is the only Austin-manufactured one remaining in the Southeast.
- Opus 1215 – Saint Matthew Lutheran Church, Hanover, Pennsylvania. Organ has four manuals, 231 ranks, and is among the world's largest. (1924)
- Opus 1267 – First United Methodist Church, Elgin, Illinois – Restored by Rogers Instruments Corp. in 2004. Now uses a Rogers console and several ranks have been added.
- Opus 1416 – Curtis Organ in the Irvine Auditorium of the University of Pennsylvania, with 10,719 pipes/162 ranks. It was restored along strict historical guidelines by Austin in 2002 and modified to be MIDI programmable. (1926)
- Opus 1526 – St. Florian Church (Hamtramck, Michigan). The organ, with 3 manuals and 26 ranks, dating from 1928, was renovated and rededicated April 13, 2008.
- Opus 1548 – Main Auditorium of Drexel University, Philadelphia, Pennsylvania, 1928. The four manual, 77 rank instrument is also called the Curtis Organ as it was donated and endowed by the same benefactors of Opus 1416 for the University of Pennsylvania. As of late 2023 the instrument was reported to need "serious restoration and cleaning" with restoration efforts proceeding "slowly".
- Opus 1591 – Holy Trinity Church Inwood, New York, New York, 1928. The two manual, 7 rank instrument was removed in 2019 for relocation to a new sanctuary. As of 2023 the restored instrument was in use in the new parish house Worship Hall.
- Opus 1712 & 1713 – Scranton Cultural Center (Masonic Temple and Scottish Rite Cathedral), Scranton, Pennsylvania. Both are operable but are in need of restoration to be fully playable. 1713 is housed in the main theater, 1712 in the larger lodge hall.
- Opus 1717 – Bulkeley Memorial Hall (now Aetna Auditorium), Rogers Building headquarters of Aetna Inc, Hartford, Connecticut, 1930. Three manuals, 20 ranks. The only Austin Quadruplex organ (roll player) still in its original installation. As of 2024 the organ and its roll player were both functional.
- Opus 1865 – Bard College, Annandale on Hudson, NY, Chapel of the Holy Innocents. 3 manuals, 47 stops.
- Opus 2180 – Third Presbyterian Church, sanctuary, Rochester, New York. Built 1952; new console & revisions 1991, with 79 ranks and 4 manuals. Features multi-level SSL combination action with piston sequencer – 40 generals per level + divisionals – 5 each.
- Opus 2199 – St. Patrick's Seminary and University, Menlo Park, California. The organ was built in 1955 and installed at St. Joseph's College in Mountain View, California. Moved and rebuilt after the 1989 Loma Prieta earthquake heavily damaged the original building.
- Opus 2237 – Bridgewater COGIC (Church of God in Christ), Cheshire, Connecticut. An organ of 7 ranks, it was purchased from St. John's Episcopal Church, West Hartford, Connecticut, in 1995.
- Opus 2369 – First Congregational Church, Stratford, Connecticut. One of the oldest continuously operating congregations in America (first gathered in 1639). The organ, with 3 manuals and 48 ranks, is installed in their fifth sanctuary that was originally built in 1859. (1962)
- Opus 2398 – Christ's Church, Rye, New York, 1964. Three manuals, 70 ranks, 56 stops.
- Opus 2432 – First Congregational Church, Port Huron, Michigan, 1965. Three manuals, 50 ranks, condition as of September 2020 not reported.
- Opus 2465 – St. Matthew's German Evangelical Lutheran Church, Charleston, South Carolina. It has 3 manuals, 47 stops, 61 ranks and electropneumatic action. (1967)
- Opus 2599 and 2600 – Christ Church, Greenwich, Connecticut, 1976-1977. Two manuals, 25 ranks (gallery) and four manuals, 67 ranks (chancel). Removed in 2021 and "returned to the builder to be repurposed"; status unknown as of 2023.
- Opus 2613 – Church of the Good Shepherd (Rosemont, Pennsylvania), 1977. Three manuals, 57 ranks. In regular use as of 2020.
- Opus 2616 – Christ Church of Oak Brook, sanctuary, Oak Brook, IL. 4-manual Allen console (added in 2002), 80 ranks with 40 additional digital ranks, 4440 pipes. (1978/80/82/86)
- Opus 2754 – First Presbyterian Church, Lakeland, Florida, 1994. Three manuals, 60 ranks. As of May 2018 reported to be in regular use.
- Opus 2761 – St. John's Episcopal Church, West Hartford, Connecticut, with 51 stops, 64 ranks, and 3,721 pipes. Pipework from Austin Opus 2123 which survived a 1992 fire was incorporated into the new instrument.
- Opus 2778 – Oxford-University United Methodist Church, Oxford, Mississippi. Installed in 2001. Two manuals, 30 ranks.
- Opus 2779 – Forbidden City Concert Hall, Beijing China, 1999
- Opus 2782 – Fountain Street Church, Grand Rapids, Michigan (1924; restored 2003)
- Opus 2785 – Cathedral of the Most Blessed Sacrament, (Detroit, Michigan), 2003.
- Opus 2795 – The First Baptist Church of the City of Washington, D.C. As of 2020 it is only the second 5-manual instrument ever built by Austin. Completed in 2013 with 120 ranks.
- Opus 2800 – Connelly Chapel of the Sacred Heart, DeSales University, Center Valley, Pennsylvania, 2019.
- Opus 2804 – The Reformed Church of Bronxville, NY. Four manuals, 90 ranks. Installation completed in February 2023.

== Lost instruments ==
- Opus 252 – Hotel Astor, New York, NY, 1910. Largest and most advanced instrument built by Austin at that point. Located on the ninth floor auditorium and the cafe L'Orangerie, it had 131 ranks. Three four-manual consoles could each control both organs. The main console contained an early form of combination pistons and two consoles were movable. There was also a roll player. The hotel was demolished in 1967 and the instrument lost to dispersion.
- Opus 309 – 1912 Chapel, Mount Hope Cemetery, Rochester, New York, 1912. Two manuals, 10 ranks. Disused since the 1970s, the chapel and its organ sustained heavy damage by neglect, vandalism, and exposure.
- Opus 558 – Medinah Temple, Chicago, Illinois, 1915. Austin's first five-manual organ. The 92-rank instrument was controlled by a five-manual gallery console and a movable four-manual console. Before the building interior demolition began for conversion to retail space in 2001, the City Council approved funding to remove the organ for eventual donation to a non-profit organization. After fourteen years in storage it was donated to a church in Old Mill Creek, Illinois but was never installed due to the prohibitively high cost of re-assembly. According to the Organ Historical Society database the instrument is no longer extant.
- Opus 939 – Cathedral-Basilica of SS. Peter and Paul Philadelphia, Pennsylvania, 1920. Four manuals, 71 ranks. Austin air chests were replaced with Tellers chests in 1957 in conjunction with a major enlargement and renovation of the cathedral. Instrument underwent additional modifications and rebuilds and only some Austin pipes remain.
- Opus 1010 – Eastman Theatre, University of Rochester, Rochester, New York, 1922. Four-manual theater organ originally listed at 229 ranks including percussion traps for the accompaniment of silent films. After rebuilding in 1951 and the theater traps were removed it was listed at 134 ranks. Removed in 1971 and dispersed. Only the echo chamber and its air chest, without pipes, remains in the theater. In 1977 the console was installed in the Cathedral-Basilica of SS. Peter and Paul in Philadelphia.
- Opus 1019 – First Presbyterian Church (now Kinergy Lifestyle Center) Wyandotte, Michigan. Built in 1922, this organ had three manuals, four divisions, 33 stops and 33 registers. In 1983, the organ received a new Schantz console and the instrument was rebuilt by the Muller Organ Company. In 2015, the organ became non-functional due to an electrical malfunction with the blower motor that caused the instrument to short-circuit. In September 2017 the church closed after 161 years of service. The building was sold and is now a complex offering worship, wellness, and event rental space. As of April 2021, the organ has been removed from the building and is no longer in existence.
