= St. John the Baptist Roman Catholic Church (Newark, Delaware) =

Historic church in Delaware, United States

- U.S. National Register of Historic Places
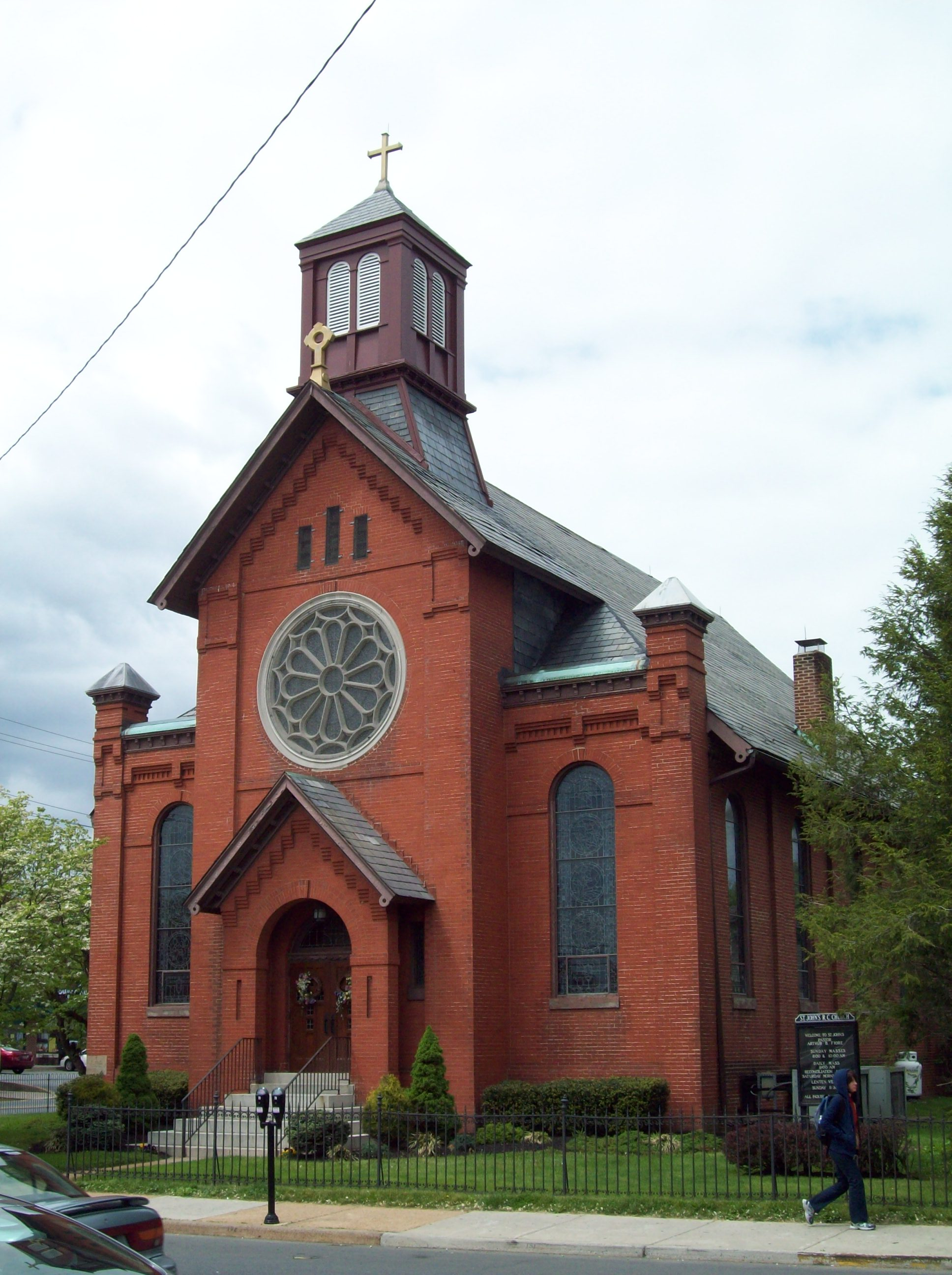
- St. John the Baptist Roman Catholic Church, Newark DE, April 2010

- Location within Delaware Location within the United States
- Location: 200 E. Main St, Newark, Delaware
- Coordinates: 39.683896°N 75.745276°W
- Area: 0.7 acres (0.28 ha)
- Built: 1883
- Architectural style: Romanesque, Vernacular Romanesque
- MPS: Newark MRA
- NRHP reference No.: 82002349
- Added to NRHP: May 7, 1982

St. John the Baptist Roman Catholic Church is a historic Roman Catholic church at 200 E. Main Street in Newark, New Castle County, Delaware. The first congregants of the church were Irish immigrants. The church was dedicated on June 24, 1883, replacing the previous structure built in the late 18th century, after the floor collapsed on Christmas Eve of 1880. The church building is a one-story rectangular brick building with a central tower and three bays on the south front facade.

It was added to the National Register of Historic Places in 1982.

It is maintained and directed by the parish of St. John the Baptist-Holy Angels which houses another worship site at 82 Possum Park Road in Newark.

== See also ==
- National Register of Historic Places listings in Newark, Delaware
