= St. John the Baptist Roman Catholic Church (Philadelphia) =

Coordinates: 40.025610°N 75.219692°W

St. John the Baptist Church
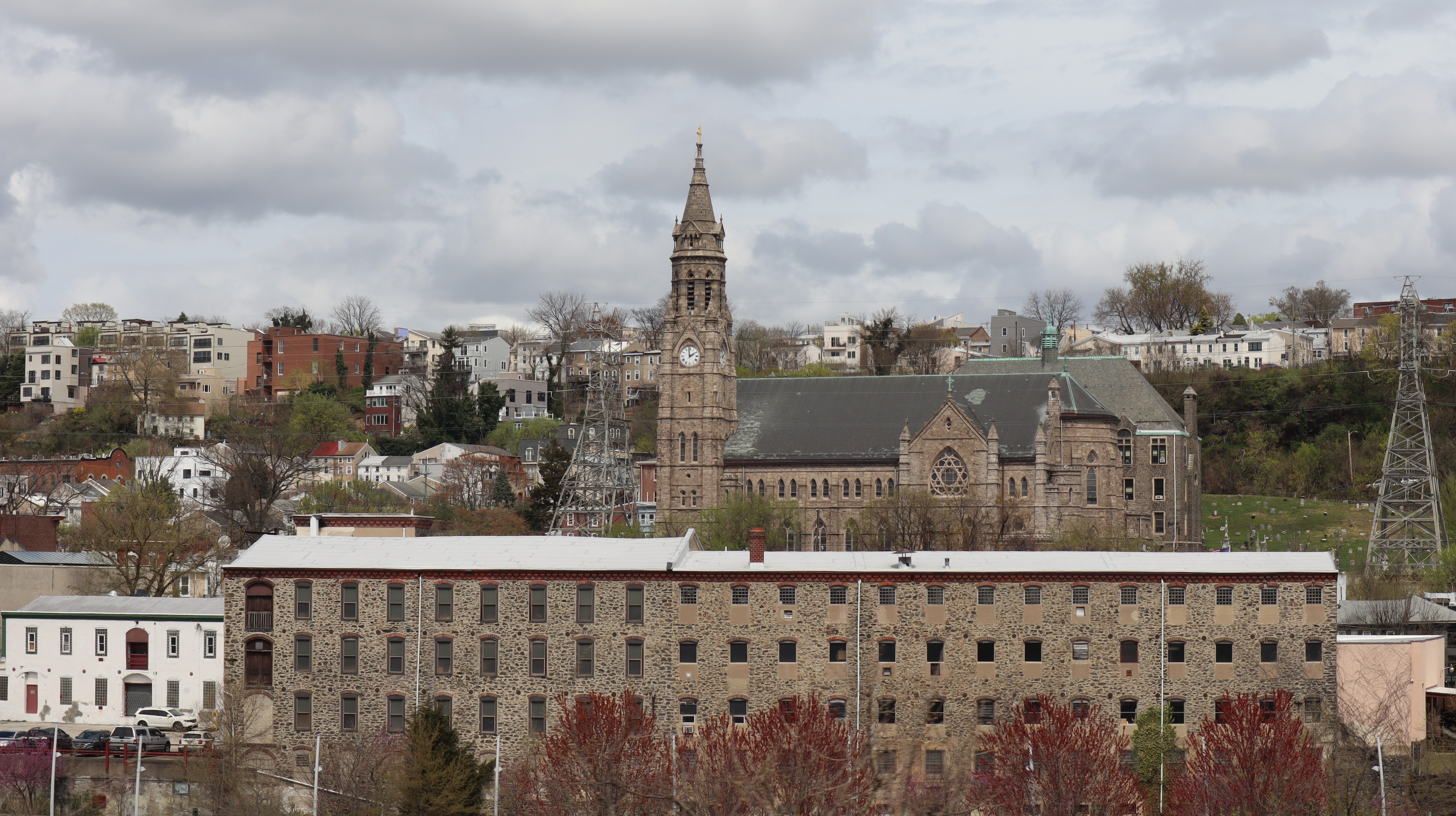
- The church and its surroundings seen from I-76 in 2024
- St. John the Baptist Church
- Location: Manayunk, Philadelphia, Pennsylvania, U.S.
- Denomination: Catholic Church

St. John the Baptist Church is a parish of the Roman Catholic Church in the Manayunk section of Philadelphia, Pennsylvania. Established in 1831, it is the tenth oldest parish in the Archdiocese of Philadelphia. The current Neo Gothic church was dedicated on April 1, 1894 and is the spiritual home for Roman Catholics living in the Philadelphia neighborhoods of Manayunk, Roxborough, and Wissahickon.

== History ==
=== Early history of the Parish ===
The prosperous mill town of Manayunk was the setting for a flood of Irish immigration in the early twentieth century. Lured by the promise of work and freedom in the dark days of the Irish Famine many moved to this location along the Schuylkill River and chose to make their home there.

As the sixth oldest parish founded within the Philadelphia city limits, yet the first parish established outside of Center City, St. John the Baptist was the first location where Catholics who immigrated to the region in the mid-nineteenth century could worship. Jerome Keating was a wealthy mill owner who came to Manayunk with his wife Eulalia, and took up residence in what later became a convent on Cresson Street. The first Catholic Mass in the area was held in the winter of 1829-1830 in the Keatings’ home. Each week, the Keatings would invite a priest to visit and celebrate mass with local Catholics. Eulalia Keating was said to have held a weekly Sunday school for a dozen or so neighboring children. Eventually, when about 20 families or 100 people were celebrating mass at the Keatings’ home, Jerome Keating proposed founding a parish. To that end he made a gift of the ground bordering his home for the construction of the church and an adjoining cemetery. The cornerstone for Saint John’s first Church was laid into place on May 10, 1830 at the site where the upper school stands today. The parish was officially established on April 4, 1831.

Bishop Kenrick conducted the cornerstone ceremony at the Presbyterian Dutch Reformed Church on Green Lane, where Mass was Occasionally help prior to the construction of the first church. Thus, Saint John the Baptist became the third church to be built in Manayunk and the first Catholic parish established outside Philadelphia's Center City. Later, Bishop Kenrick announced that Father Thomas Gegan would be appointed first pastor. Bishop Kenrick wrote in his diary: "...the buildling of the original church was mainly due to Jerome Keating's practical piety and his excellent wife."

Less than a year later, construction was complete. The parish of St. John the Baptist, now 60 families strong, had its first home. The first recorded burial in St. John's cemetery was for "Patrick Montegue, age 50 years, born in Ireland, buried August 29, 1832."

Sadly Jerome Keating did not live long enough to see the rapid growth of the new parish. Not long after he passed away in 1833, his wife joined convent. Eulalia Keating, mother of three, became Sister Mary Joseph in the Order of the Visitation in Georgetown. Their daughter, Amelia, who was among the first 12 children to receive their First Holy Communion at the church, eventually entered the Carmelite Order in Baltimore, MD. Eulalia Keating joined her husband in death in 1873 and is buried alongside him at St. John's cemetery near the Rector Street entrance.

With a growing population of the small manufacturing town, the first church of Saint John the Baptist Manayunk became too small. In 1881 Bernard McCane bequeathed $100,000 to “Erect and build a church where Saint John the Baptist Church now stands on Rector Street, and to buy and have cast a bell.” The cornerstone for the current church was laid on the northwest corner of the property on September 13, 1886. The church was built at a total cost of $250,000, financed with the help of the local community.

=== Consolidation of the Parish ===
In 2012, the Archdiocese of Philadelphia consolidated St. John the Baptist Parish with St. Mary of the Assumption and St. Josaphat Roman Catholic Church in Philadelphia. The St. Josaphat Church property (1898, Cotton Street) is used and maintained as a worship site for the parish, while the St. Mary of the Assumption Church property (1848, Connaroe Street) was sold. The St. Mary church stands although it no longer functions as a worship site. The St. Mary of the Assumption Cemetery on Cinnaminson Street in Roxborough is maintained by the parish.

== Physical description ==
The present church was completed in 1894, with the ensuing clock and bell tower completed in 1906. The church was designed by famed New York architect Patrick Keely and towers over the rowhouses of Manayunk. a)

Much of the church interior was completed in the early 1900s Many of the sculptures and the Stations of the Cross were crafted by the eminent New York ecclesiastical sculptor Joseph Sibbel, who is said to have worked often with Patrick Keely.

The organ is a 1906 Austin.

In 2015, the parish undertook a $1 million capital campaign to restore the tower and roof of the church.

=== Parish cemetery ===
The parish cemetery contains several interments the earliest being in 1829. Numerous Civil War veterans are buried here including Medal of Honor recipient Peter McAdams. Purportedly, the cemetery contains the largest collection of Civil War veterans of any small cemetery in the nation.
