= Steve McCarter =

American politician (born 1947)

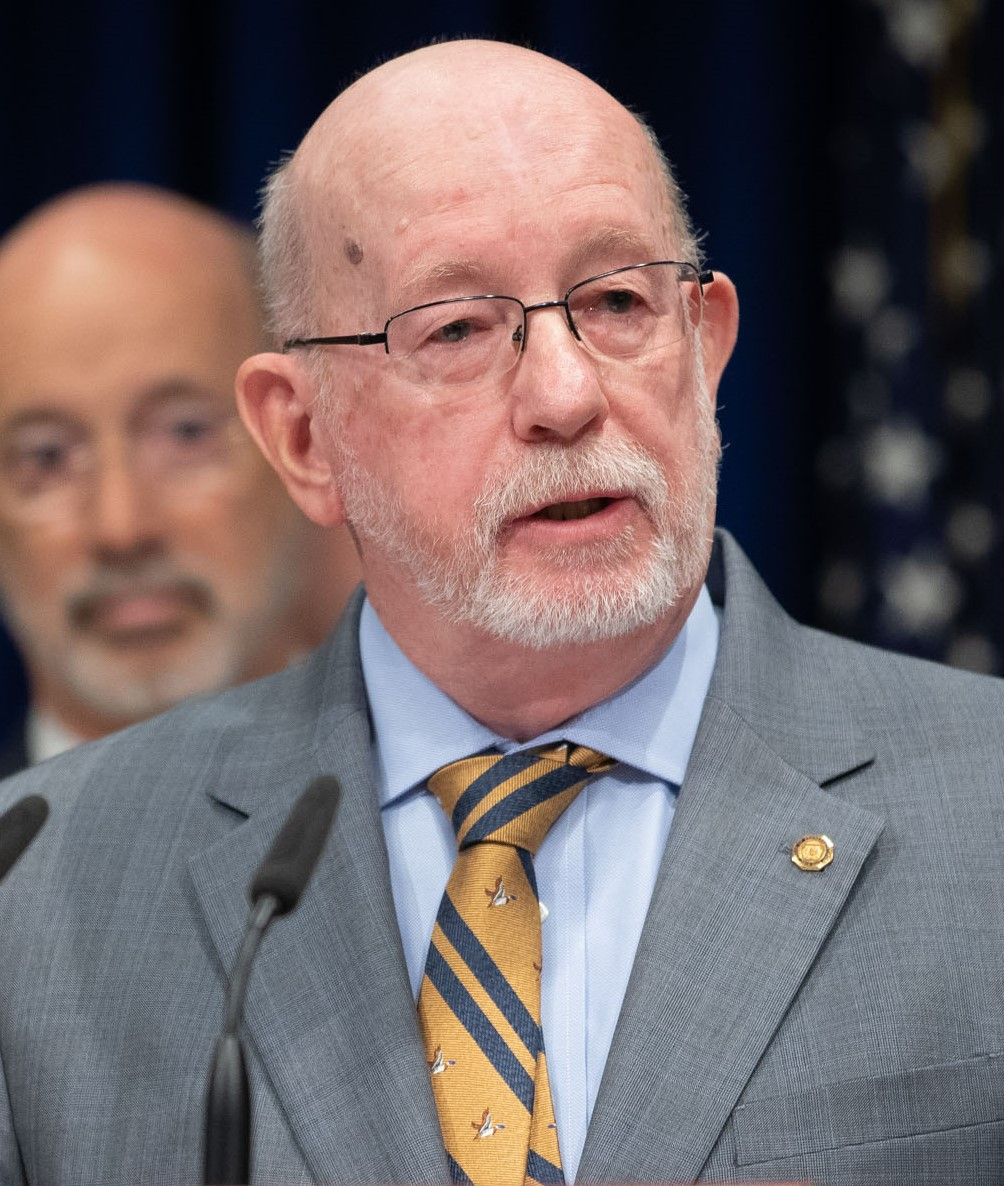

Member of the Pennsylvania House of Representatives from the 154th district
- In office January 1, 2013 – November 30, 2020
- Preceded by: Lawrence Curry
- Succeeded by: Napoleon Nelson

Personal details
- Party: Democratic
- Spouse: Deborah McCarter
- Occupation: Politician, schoolteacher

Stephen McCarter (born February 16, 1947) is a retired American educator and politician. He was a Democratic member of the Pennsylvania House of Representatives, representing the 154th legislative district from 2012 until 2020. The district was located in Montgomery and Philadelphia counties, including Cheltenham Township, Jenkintown, Springfield Township, and part of Philadelphia's 35th Ward.

== Background ==
Prior to his election as a state representative, McCarter was a high school social studies teacher for 35 years in Abington and Lower Merion. He holds a Bachelor of Science degree in education from Temple University and a Masters of Science degree in education from the University of Pennsylvania. He also worked as an adjunct professor of education at the University of Pennsylvania, and was a captain in the US Army Reserve.

McCarter has served as the Chairman of the Cheltenham School District Local Tax Study Commission, and he was also a member of the Cheltenham Development Corporation, Cheltenham Historical Commission, and a board member and mideastern region president for the Pennsylvania State Education Association. McCarter and his wife Deborah currently reside in Glenside. They have lived in Cheltenham Township for 25 years, including nearby Elkins Park and Jenkintown.

== State representative ==
Following an announcement by incumbent State Representative Lawrence Curry that he would not be seeking re-election in 2012, McCarter announced his candidacy for the 154th District's house seat. He ran unopposed in the primary election and went on to defeat Republican Mark Sirinides with 72.62 percent of the vote. McCarter won every precinct in the legislative district.

McCarter serves on the Aging & Older Adult Services, Children & Youth, Environmental Resources & Energy, and Policy committees.

As a state representative, McCarter has called for increased state funding for infrastructure and education, and supported an extraction tax on natural gas drillers. Following the Supreme Court's decision on the Defense of Marriage Act, McCarter announced that he and State Representative Brian Sims would introduce a bill to legalize same-sex marriage in Pennsylvania.

In December 2019, McCarter announced that he will not seek re-election in 2020.
