= Charles Mebus =

American politician (1928–1990)

Charles F. Mebus

Member of the Pennsylvania House of Representatives from the 154th district
- In office 1969–1978
- Preceded by: District created
- Succeeded by: Charles Nahill

Member of the Pennsylvania House of Representatives from the Montgomery County district
- In office 1965–1968

Personal details
- Born: Charles Fillmore Mebus; June 15, 1928 Abington, Pennsylvania
- Died: January 12, 1990 (aged 61) Hershey, Pennsylvania
- Party: Republican
- Spouse: Kathleen A. Carlson
- Children: Lisa Jane Mebus
- Education: Pennsylvania State University
- Occupation: Civil engineer, business owner

Charles Fillmore Mebus (June 15, 1928 — January 12, 1990) was a former Republican member of the Pennsylvania House of Representatives.

== Biography ==
A resident of Wyncote, Pennsylvania in 1965, Charles Mebus was elected to the multi member Third Legislative District of the Pennsylvania State House of Representatives from Montgomery County, Pennsylvania, United States. He served until 1968 when he was elected to the newly established single member 154th Pennsylvania State Assembly District which included all of Cheltenham Township, the borough of Jenkintown, Pennsylvania and a portion of Springfield Township, Montgomery County, Pennsylvania.

He would serve for six terms before retiring in 1978.

He died in Hershey, Pennsylvania on January 2, 1990.
