= Charles Nahill =

American politician (1938–2009)

Charles F. Nahill, Jr.

Member of the Pennsylvania House of Representatives from the 154th district
- In office 1979–1992
- Preceded by: Charles Mebus
- Succeeded by: Lawrence Curry

Personal details
- Born: November 12, 1938 Philadelphia, Pennsylvania
- Died: October 4, 2009 (aged 70) Wyncote, Pennsylvania
- Party: Republican
- Spouse(s): (1) Nancy Chestek; (2) Joanne Buggy
- Children: 3
- Education: College of William and Mary, B.A., Temple University, M.B.A.
- Occupation: Business Executive

Charles Francis Nahill, Jr. (November 12, 1938 – October 4, 2009) was a former Republican member of the Pennsylvania House of Representatives.

== Early life ==
Nahill grew up in Mount Airy, Pennsylvania. He attended Germantown Academy for high school. He received his bachelor's degree from the College of William and Mary and his master's degree from Temple University.

== Career ==
From 1961 to 1963, Nahill served in the US Army and remained in the Army Reserve until 1968.

== Political career ==
A resident of Wyncote, Pennsylvania, Charles F. Nahill, Jr., succeeded Charles F. Mebus as the representative of the 154th Pennsylvania State Assembly District, representing Cheltenham Township, the borough of Jenkintown, Pennsylvania, and Springfield Township, Montgomery County, Pennsylvania in 1979, and served until 1992 when he declined renomination. During his tenure, he chaired the Committee on Aging and Youth and served on the Transportation Committee and Local Government Commission.

From 1990 to 1993, Nahill headed the Montgomery County Republican Party.

== Death ==
Nahill died of heart disease in October 2009.
