= Pennsylvania House of Representatives, District 154 =

American legislative district

Pennsylvania's 154th State House of Representatives district
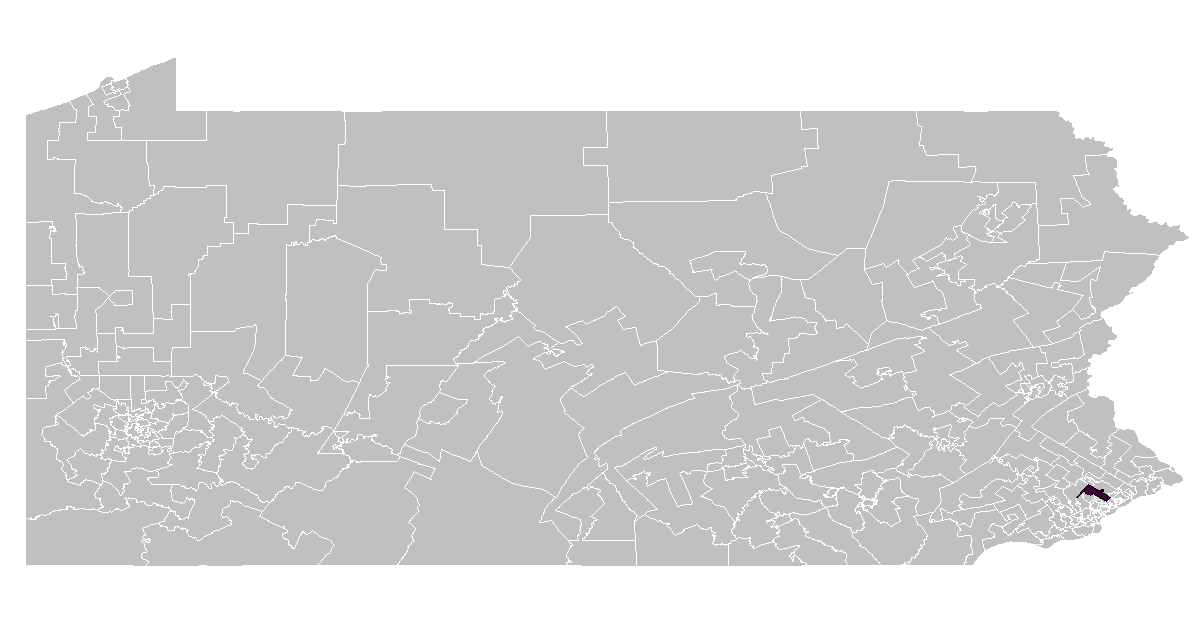
Representative
Napoleon Nelson; D–Cheltenham Township

The 154th Pennsylvania House of Representatives District is located in Montgomery County and includes the following areas:

- Cheltenham Township
- Jenkintown
- Springfield Township

== Representatives ==
Representative	Party	Years	District home	Note
Prior to 1969, seats were apportioned by county.
Charles F. Mebus	Republican	1969 – 1979	Wyncote	
Charles F. Nahill, Jr.	Republican	1979 – 1993	Wyncote	
Lawrence H. Curry	Democrat	1993 – 2013	Jenkintown	
Steven McCarter	Democratic	2013 – 2020	Glenside	
Napoleon Nelson	Democratic	2020 – present	Cheltenham Township	
