= Carl J. Seiberlich =

United States Navy admiral

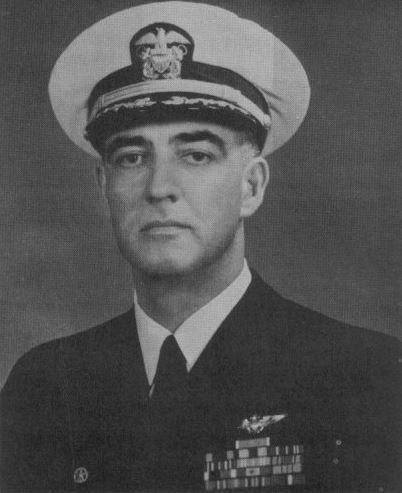
- Born: July 4, 1921; Jenkintown, Pennsylvania, US
- Died: March 24, 2006 (aged 84) Reston, Virginia, US
- Buried: Arlington National Cemetery
- Allegiance: United States
- Branch: United States Navy and United States Merchant Marine
- Service years: 1943–1980
- Rank: Rear Admiral
- Commands: USS Salamonie; USS Hornet
- Conflicts: World War II: Battle of the Atlantic; Battle of Salerno; Battle of Anzio; Battle of Okinawa
- Awards: Legion of Merit (6); Air Medal

Rear Admiral Carl Joseph Seiberlich (July 4, 1921 – March 24, 2006) was a naval aviator in the United States Navy who commanded the aircraft carrier USS Hornet that picked up the Apollo 11 and Apollo 12 astronauts after splashdown in the Pacific. He was the first man qualified to land airships, airplanes and helicopters on an aircraft carrier.

== Early life ==
Carl J.Seiberlich was born in Jenkintown, Pennsylvania, on July 4, 1921, to Charles A. and Helen L. (Dolan) Seiberlich. In high school he joined the Sea Scouts, earning the Quartermaster Award, its highest rank. His first experience of flight came when he accepted a demonstration ride around New York Harbor in a Pitcairn PCA-2 autogyro from aviation pioneer Harold Pitcairn.

On graduation from high school, Seiberlich received an appointment to the United States Naval Academy, but a physician at the Philadelphia Navy Yard rejected him for having flat feet. He instead entered the University of Pennsylvania, but later decided to transfer to the United States Merchant Marine Academy in Kings Point, New York. While there he served briefly in the Battle of the Atlantic on the troop ships SS Joseph Lykes and SS Mormachawk. He graduated in 1943 with a Bachelor of Science degree in Marine Transportation, and accepted a commission as an ensign in the United States Navy Reserve in April 1943.

Seiberlich was posted to the destroyer USS Mayo. He spent the rest of World War II on her, participating in the Battle of Salerno, where Mayo engaged German tanks, and the Battle of Anzio, where Mayo was badly damaged by a naval mine. In 1945, Mayo went to the Pacific, and participated in the Battle of Okinawa. Seiberlich was present on Mayo in Tokyo Bay for the signing of the Japanese Instrument of Surrender on the USS Missouri in September 1945.

== Naval aviation ==
With the war over, Seiberlich reported to the Naval Air Training Center at the Naval Air Station (NAS) Lakehurst, where he was trained to fly K-class blimps. Here, he met Trudy Germi, who later became his wife, during a Miss America pageant in Atlantic City. On graduation, he was posted to NAS Santa Ana and then NAS Moffett, flying blimps. At one point he set a record for crossing the United States in a blimp. He also became the first person to make a night landing on an aircraft carrier, the USS Mindoro, in a blimp. In 1951 he was awarded the Harmon Trophy for his pioneering work in blimps.

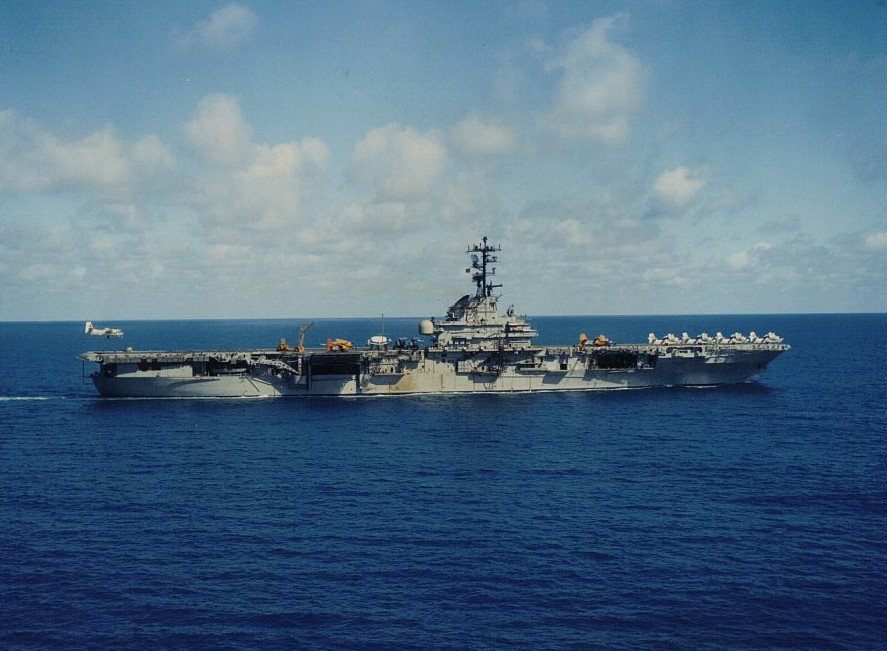
The aircraft carrier USS Hornet

In March 1952, Seiberlich went to NAS Pensacola for training in heavier than air aircraft. On graduation, he was posted to NAS Hutchinson, where he qualified on the Consolidated PB4Y-2 Privateer. He subsequently flew the Lockheed P2V Neptune. In 1958, he became executive officer of VS-36 on the aircraft carrier USS Valley Forge. The following year he attended the Armed Forces Staff College. He then assumed command of VS-26, flying the Grumman S-2 Tracker from the aircraft carrier USS Randolph.

In 1961, Seiberlich became the Plans Officer for Vice Admiral Edmund B. Taylor, the Commander of Antisubmarine Warfare Forces of the Atlantic Fleet. As such Seiberlich had an important role in surveillance, reconnaissance and anti-submarine warfare during the Cuban Missile Crisis. In 1963 he became the navigator of the aircraft carrier USS Intrepid. He qualified to land HSS-1 Seabat helicopters on an aircraft carrier, thereby becoming the first naval aviator to qualify to land airships, airplanes and helicopters on an aircraft carrier.

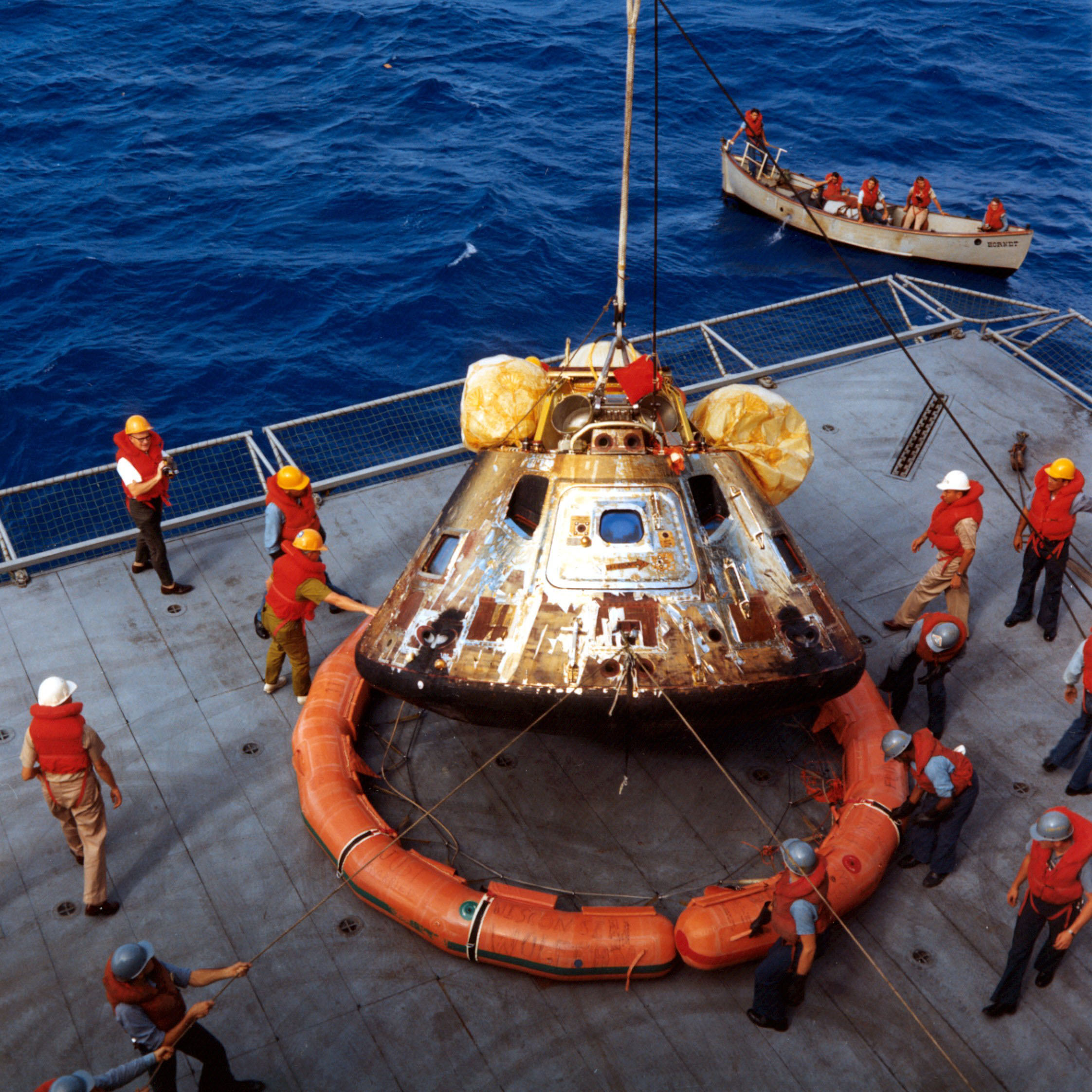
The Apollo 11 Command Module is lowered to the deck of the USS Hornet.

After two years with the Naval Air Reserve Training Command at NAS Glenview, Seiberlich received his first ship command, of the fleet oiler USS Salamonie in 1967. He was its last commanding officer, remaining with it until its decommissioning at the Philadelphia Navy Yard in December 1968. In May 1969, he assumed command of the aircraft carrier USS Hornet. As such, he was in charge of the recovery of the crew of Apollo 11 on July 24, 1969, and of the crew of Apollo 12 on November 24, 1969. He remained in command of Hornet until it too was decommissioned, in June 1970. He then became the commander of Antisubmarine Warfare Group 3, flying his flag from the aircraft carrier USS Ticonderoga.

Seiberlich subsequently served as Director of Aviation Programs, Assistant Deputy Chief of Naval Operations for Air Warfare, Deputy Chief of Naval Personnel, and Commander, Naval Military Personnel Command. He retired from the Navy in 1980. During his career he had been awarded the Legion of Merit six times. He had also been awarded the Air Medal.

== Later life ==
Seiberlich became director of personnel of VSE Corporation in 1980. In 1982 he became president of the US Maritime Resource Center at the United States Merchant Marine Academy in King's Point. The following year he joined American President Lines as its Director of Military programs. He received the Navy League of the United States' Vincent T. Hirsch Maritime Award for his role in sealift operations support of Operation Desert Shield and Operation Desert Storm. In 1997 he became a consultant for transportation and military programs at TranSystems Corporation. He served as the U.S. representative to the International Standards Organization Subcommittee on Intermodal and Short Sea Shipping, and on the International Maritime Security Working Group and Ship/Port Interface Committee. RADM CARL J. SEIBERLICH ’43, USN (RET.) was inducted into the United States Merchant Marine Academy Hall of Distinguished Graduates on September 28, 1996 citing his “Distinguished Merchant Marine and Navy Careers” as well as being “First Kings Pointer to Attain Flag Rank”

Seiberlich and his wife Trudy are survived by two sons, Eric Paul Seiberlich and Curt August Seiberlich, a daughter, Heidi Seiberlich, and four grandchildren, Cole Frederic Seiberlich, Blair August Seiberlich, Carl Robert Weimer, and Margaret Whitney Weimer. He died at Reston Hospital Center in Virginia on March 24, 2006. A memorial Catholic mass was held on July 11 at the Fort Myer Chapel in Arlington, Virginia, after which he was buried with full military honors at Arlington National Cemetery.
