= Jenkins' Town Lyceum Building =

- U.S. National Register of Historic Places
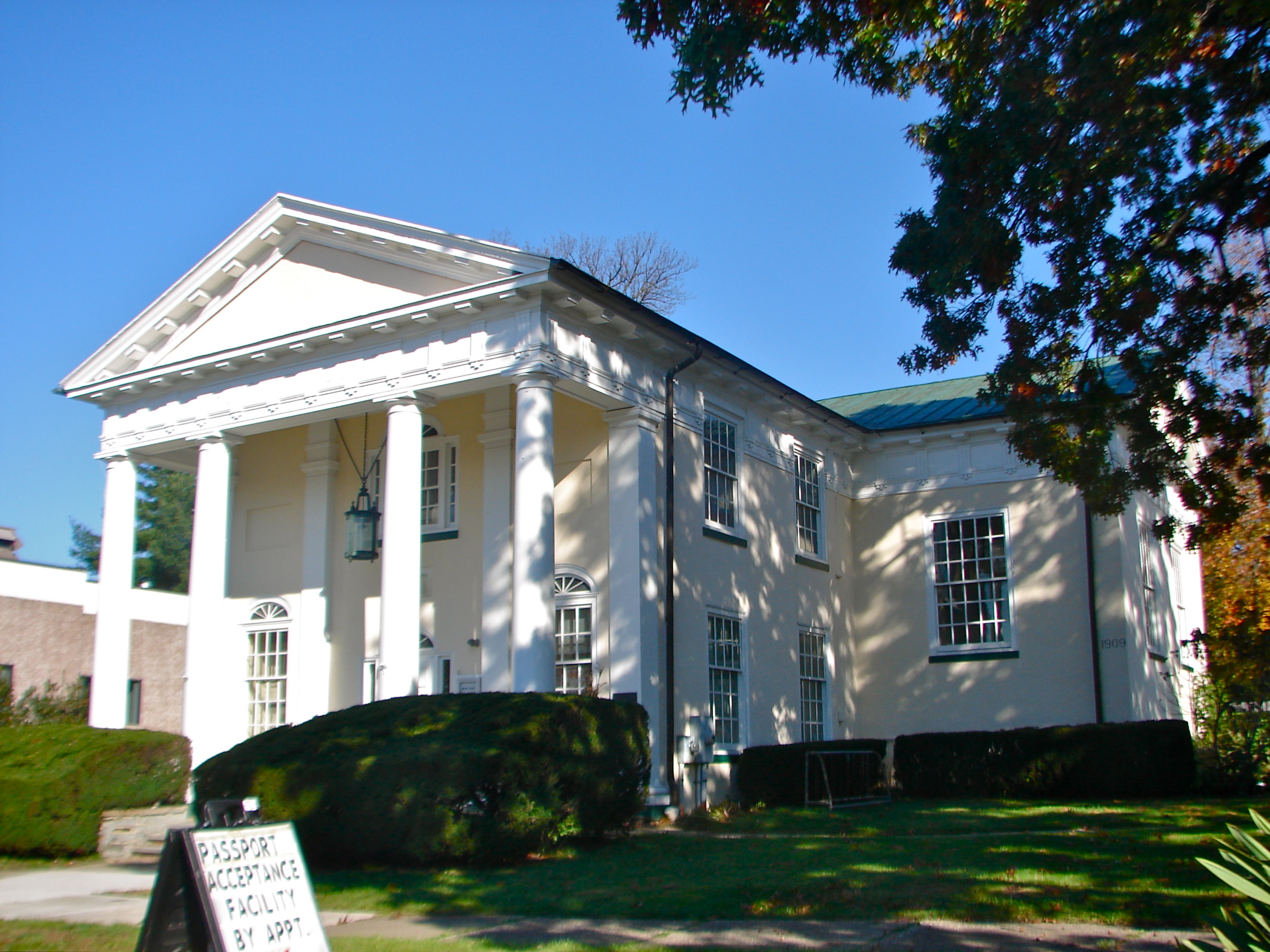
- Jenkins' Town Lyceum Building, November 2011

- Location within Pennsylvania Location within the United States
- Location: Old York and Vista Roads, Jenkintown, Pennsylvania
- Coordinates: 40°05′55″N 75°07′32″W
- Area: 1.1 acres (0.45 ha)
- Built: 1839, 1909–1910
- Architect: Sines, John; Borie, Charles L.
- NRHP reference No.: 79002303
- Added to NRHP: October 16, 1979

The Jenkins' Town Lyceum Building, also known as the Jenkintown Library, is an historic lyceum and library building in Jenkintown, Pennsylvania, United States.

It was added to the National Register of Historic Places in 1979.

== History and architectural features ==
The original building was built in 1839, and was then expanded between 1909 and 1910. It is a two-story, fieldstone building with a gable roof and a one-story rear wing and addition. It features a two-story, columned portico with a flagstone floor. The Reading Room and Lambert Memorial Room have notable decorations.
