= Glenside Memorial Hall =

- U.S. National Register of Historic Places
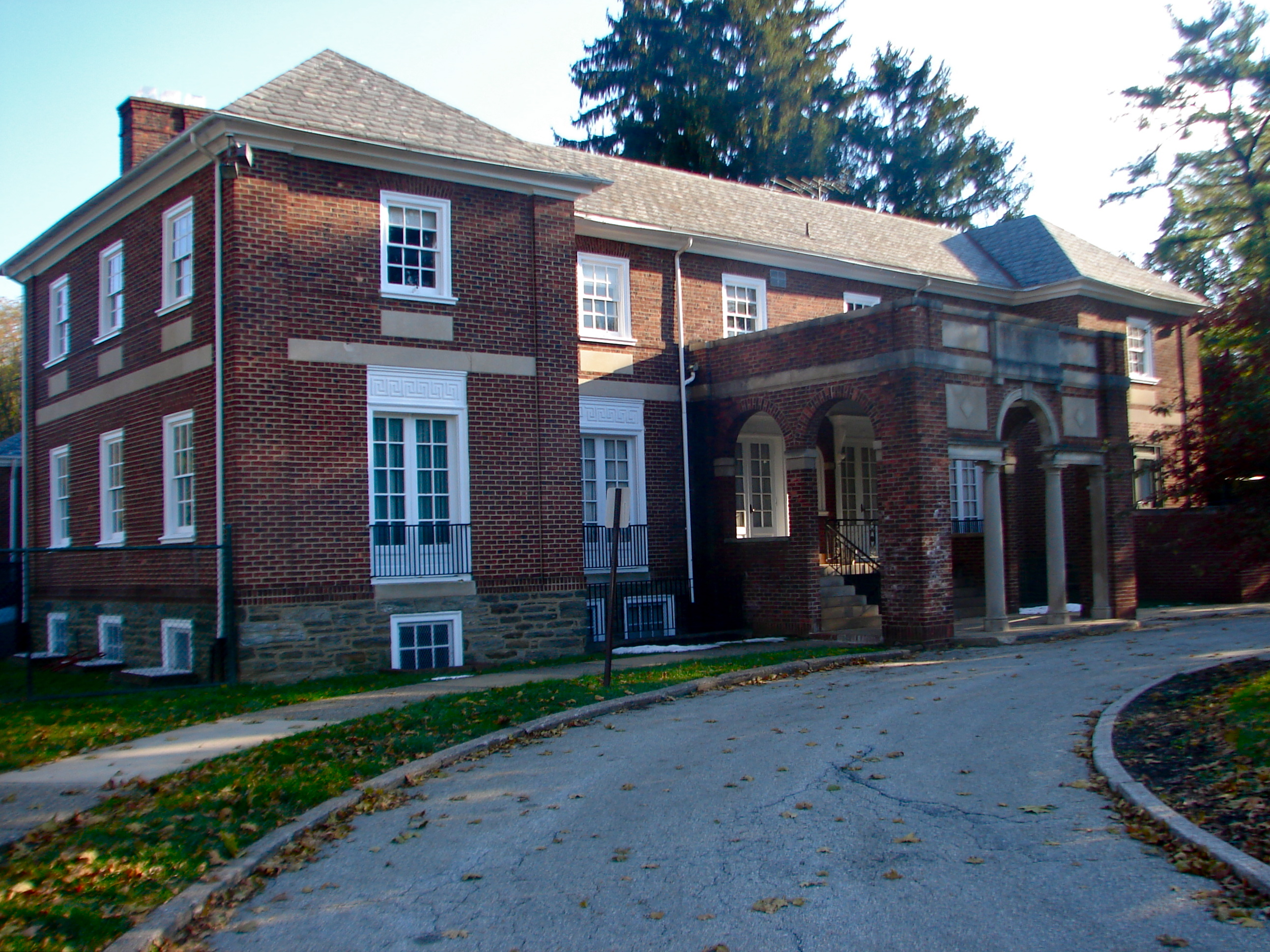
- Glenside Memorial Hall from Keswick Avenue

- Location within Philadelphia
- Location: 185 South Keswick Avenue; Glenside, Cheltenham Township, Pennsylvania United States
- Coordinates: 40°5′51″N 75°9′10″W
- Built: 1926
- Architect: Frank Seeburger
- Architectural style: Colonial Revival
- NRHP reference No.: 04000438
- Added to NRHP: May 12, 2004

Glenside Memorial Hall often abbreviated "Glenside Hall" is a historic meeting hall located in the Philadelphia suburb of Glenside, Cheltenham Township, Montgomery County, Pennsylvania. Glenside Hall was built in 1926, and is a 2 1/2-story, T-shaped, red-brick Colonial Revival-style building with limestone trim. It sits on a raised stone foundation and has a slate-covered gable roof. It was to honor the veterans of World War I. Today, it is used primarily for banquets, meetings, and other social events.

It was added to the National Register of Historic Places in 2004.

== Gallery ==
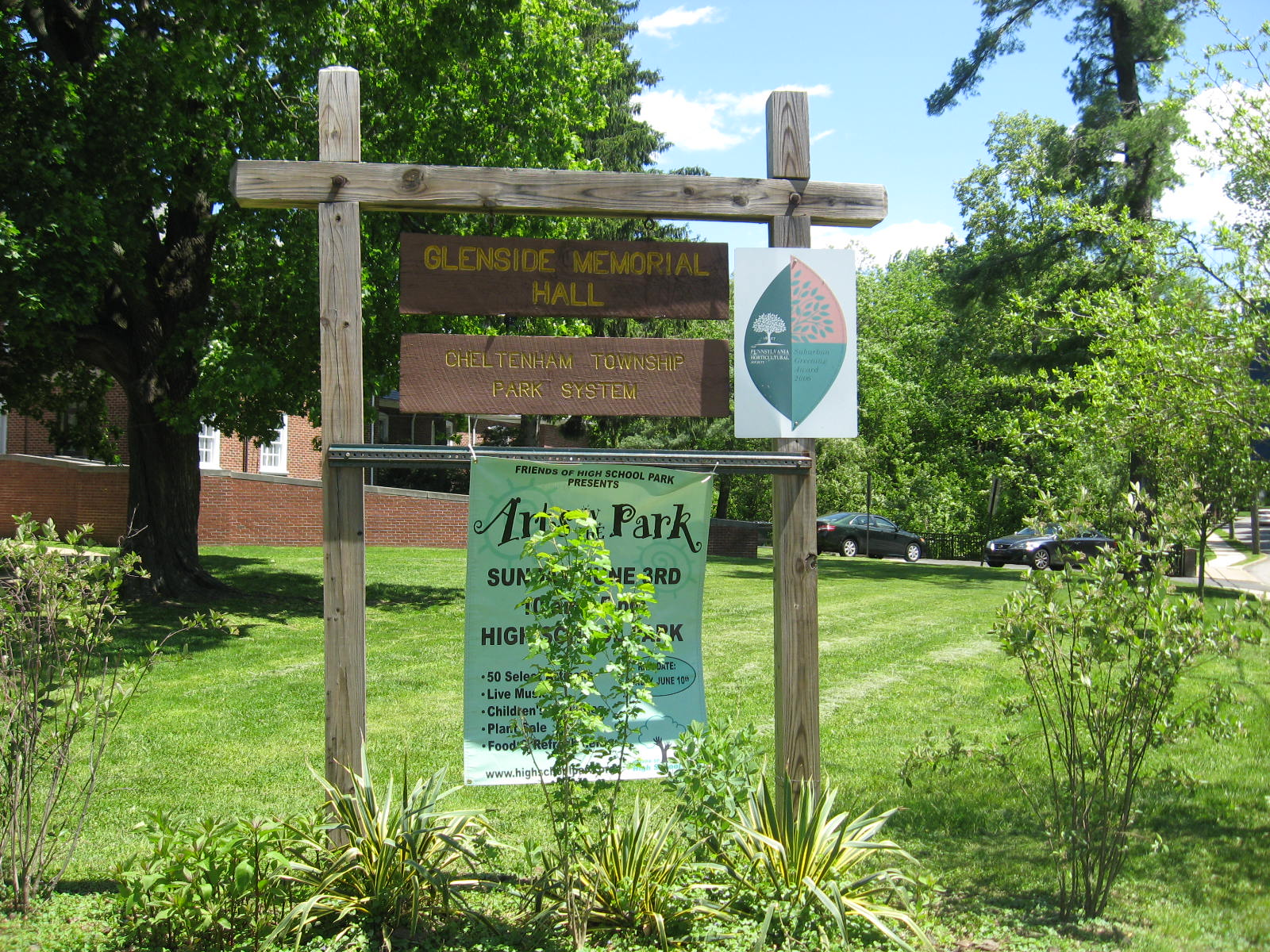
The entrance sign to Glenside Hall

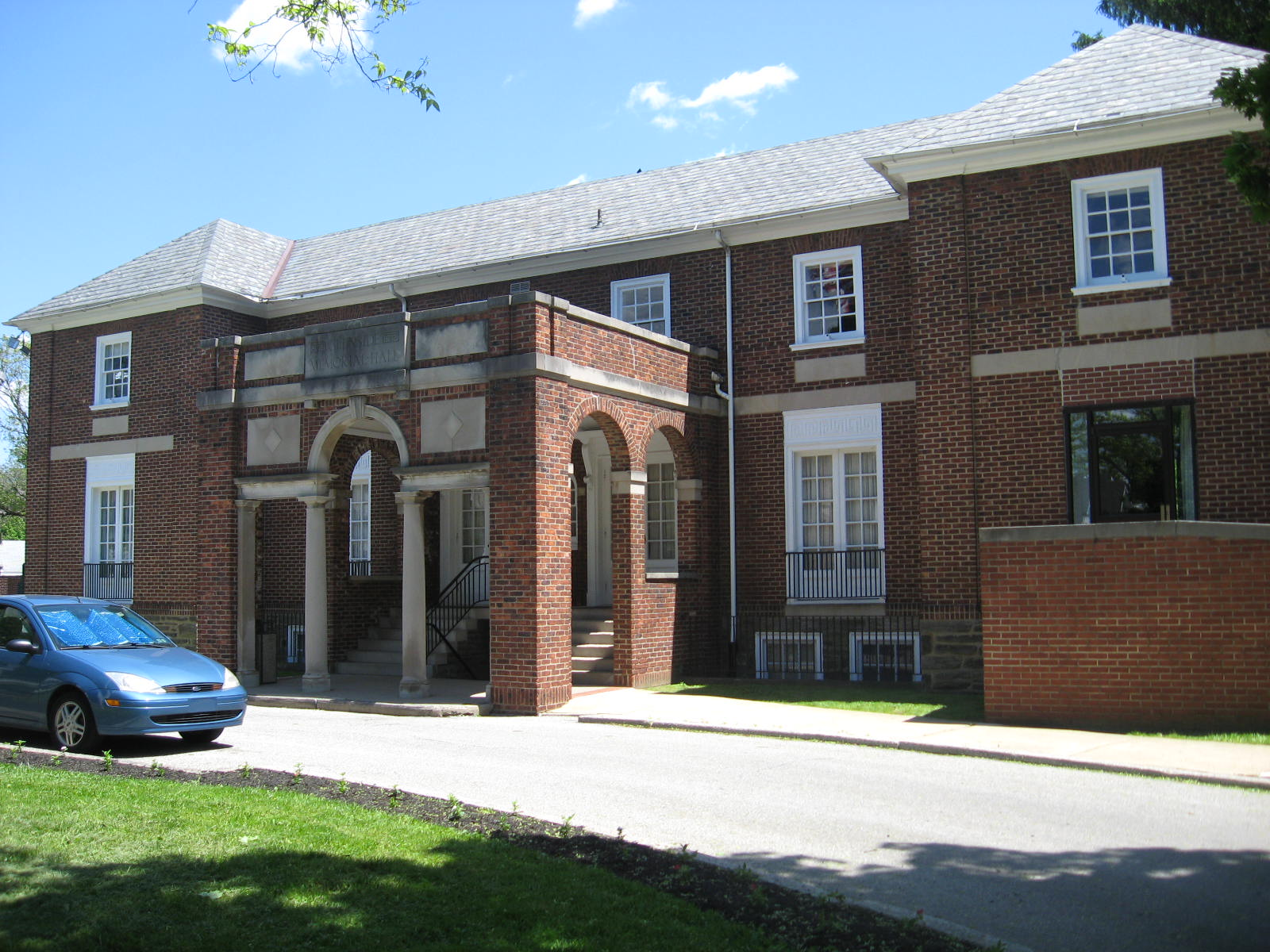
Close-up of Glenside Hall

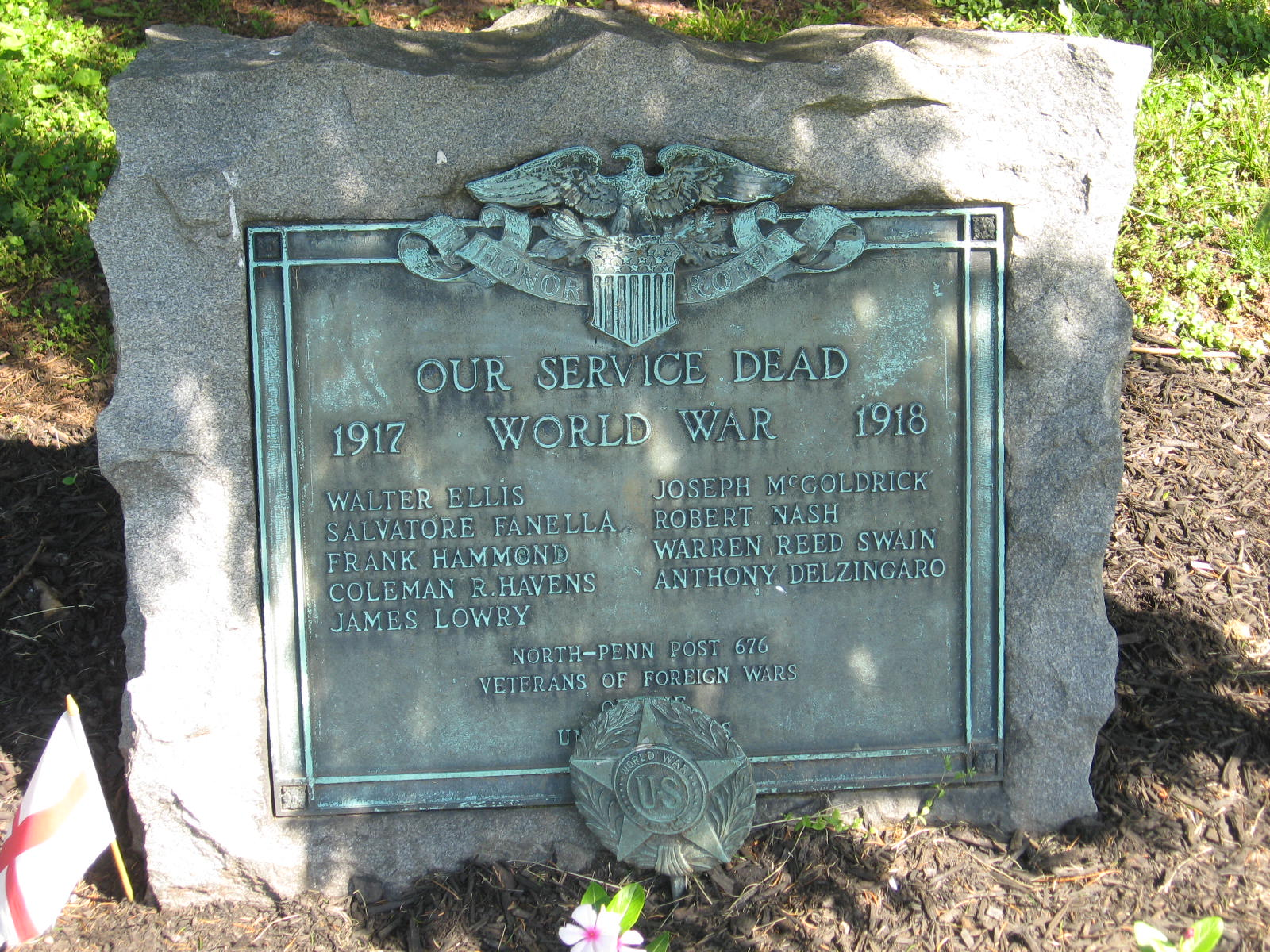
The Veterans for whom the hall is dedicated to

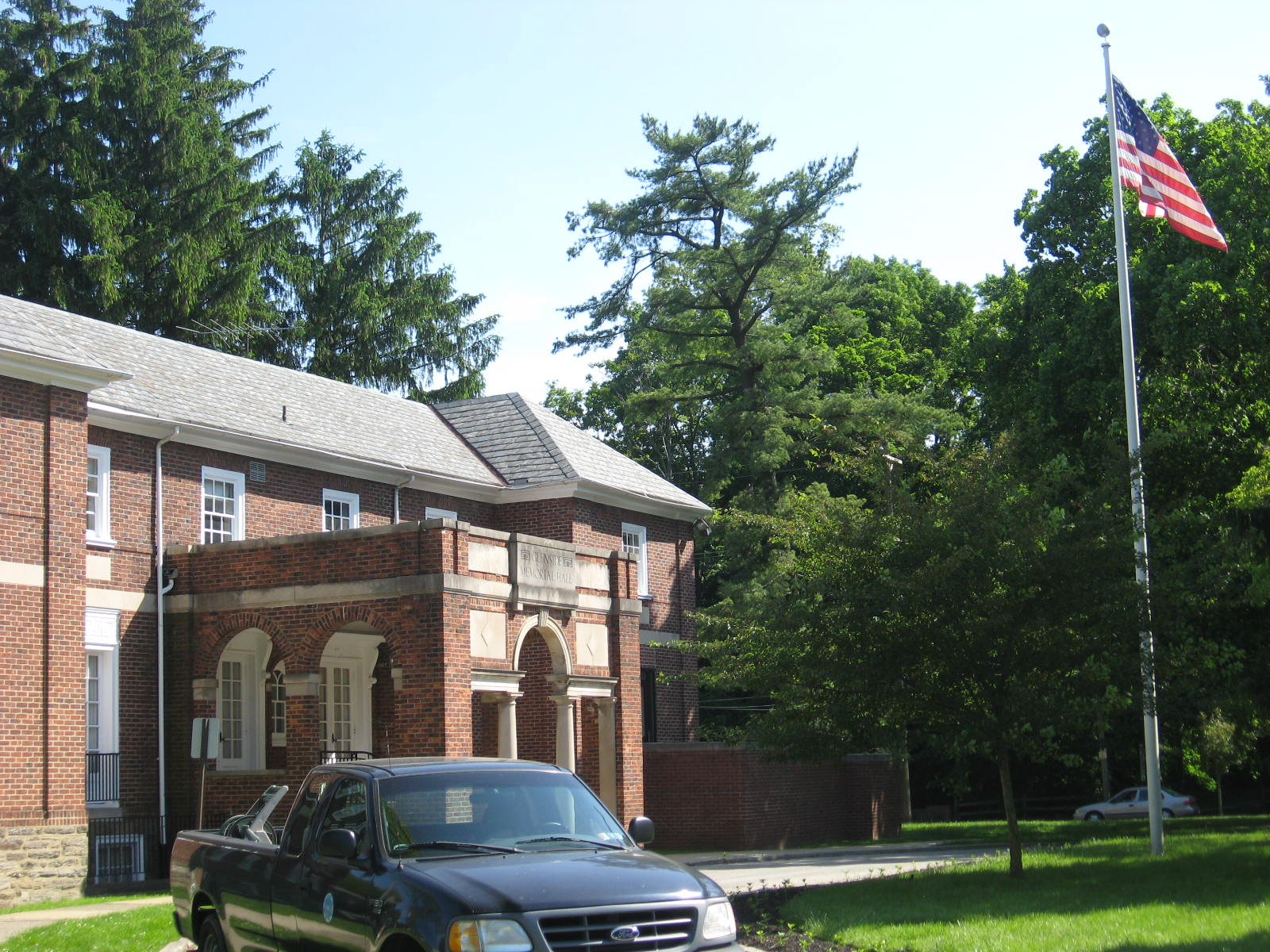
Glenside Hall
