= Lawrence Curry =

American politician (1935–2018)

Member of the Pennsylvania House of Representatives from the 154th district
- In office January 5, 1993 – November 30, 2012
- Preceded by: Charles Nahill
- Succeeded by: Steve McCarter

Personal details
- Born: February 21, 1935 Camden, New Jersey
- Died: December 17, 2018 (aged 83) Jenkintown, Pennsylvania, U.S.
- Party: Democratic

Lawrence Hummel "Larry" Curry (February 21, 1935 – December 17, 2018) was a Democratic member of the Pennsylvania House of Representatives. He represented the 154th District from 1993 until 2012.

== Biography ==
Curry was born in Camden, New Jersey. He lived in Jenkintown, Pennsylvania and graduated from Jenkintown High School. He received his bachelor's and master's degrees from University of Pennsylvania and another master's degree from Temple University. Curry taught history at the University of the Arts in Philadelphia, Pennsylvania. Curry served on the Montgomery County Board of Commissioners and on the Jenkintown Borough Council.
