= Napoleon Nelson =

American politician

Napoleon J. Nelson, Sr.

Member of the Pennsylvania House of Representatives from the 154th district
- Incumbent
- Assumed office January 5, 2021
- Preceded by: Steve McCarter

Finance Officer, Cheltenham Township, Pennsylvania
- Incumbent
- Assumed office 2018

Board Director, Cheltenham School District
- In office 2011–2017

Personal details
- Party: Democratic
- Spouse: Shareese
- Children: 2
- Education: Massachusetts Institute of Technology (BS); Wharton School (MBA)
- Occupation: Financier

Napoleon J. Nelson, Sr. is an American politician. He is a Democrat representing District 154 in the Pennsylvania House of Representatives.

== Early life ==
Nelson attended Central High School and graduated in 1998. He graduated from the Massachusetts Institute of Technology in 2002 with a Bachelor of Science in Computer Science, and earned an MBA from the Wharton School of the University of Pennsylvania in 2007.

== Political career ==
Nelson served as board director for the Cheltenham school district from 2011 to 2017, and became the finance officer for Cheltenham Township, Pennsylvania in 2018.

In 2019, former state representative Steve McCarter announced that he would not seek re-election in 2020, and Nelson ran for the open seat. He won a six-way Democratic primary with 39.2% of the vote, and went on to win the general election with 77.5% of the vote. He assumed office on December 1, 2020, becoming the first black state representative for Pennsylvania's 154th District. Nelson currently sits on the Aging & Older Adult Services, Children & Youth, Education, and Finance committees. Nelson was re-elected in 2021 with 80.7% of the vote.

=== Electoral record ===
2020 Democratic primary: Pennsylvania House of Representatives, District 154
| Party | Candidate | Votes | % |
|---|---|---|---|
| Democratic | Napoleon Nelson | 7,101 | 39.2 |
| Democratic | Gretchen Wisehart | 3,639 | 20.1 |
| Democratic | Adrienne Redd | 2,435 | 13.4 |
| Democratic | Ray Sosa | 1,994 | 11.0 |
| Democratic | Jay Conners | 1,664 | 9.2 |
| Democratic | Jennifer Lugar | 1,275 | 7.0 |
| Total votes | | 18,108 | 100.0 |

2020 general election: Pennsylvania House of Representatives, District 154
| Party | Candidate | Votes | % |
|---|---|---|---|
| Democratic | Napoleon Nelson | 29,508 | 77.5 |
| Republican | Kathleen Bowers | 8,560 | 22.5 |
| Total votes | | 38,068 | 100.0 |
| Democratic hold | | | |

2022 general election: Pennsylvania House of Representatives, District 154
| Party | Candidate | Votes | % |
|---|---|---|---|
| Democratic | Napoleon Nelson | 26,418 | 80.7 |
| Republican | Angelina Banks | 6,312 | 19.3 |
| Total votes | | 32,730 | 100.0 |
| Democratic hold | | | |

2024 general election: Pennsylvania House of Representatives, District 154
| Party | Candidate | Votes | % |
|---|---|---|---|
| Democratic | Napoleon Nelson | 31,179 | 80.1 |
| Republican | Thomas Estilow | 7,648 | 19.7 |
| | Other/write-in | 91 | 0.2 |
| Total votes | | 38,918 | 100.0 |
| Democratic hold | | | |
