= Jenkintown, Pennsylvania =

Borough in Pennsylvania, US

- Borough
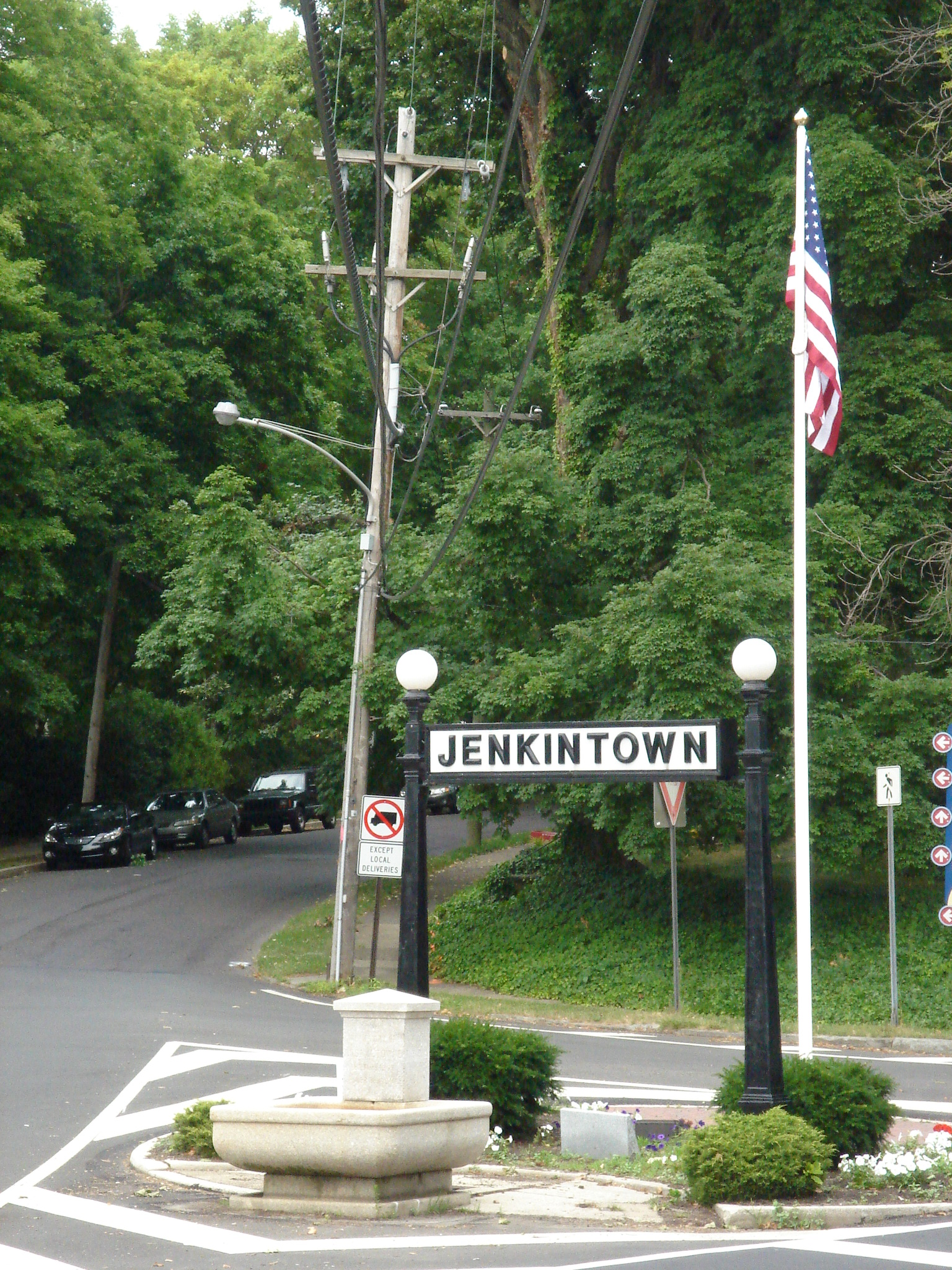
- View entering Jenkintown from Wyncote

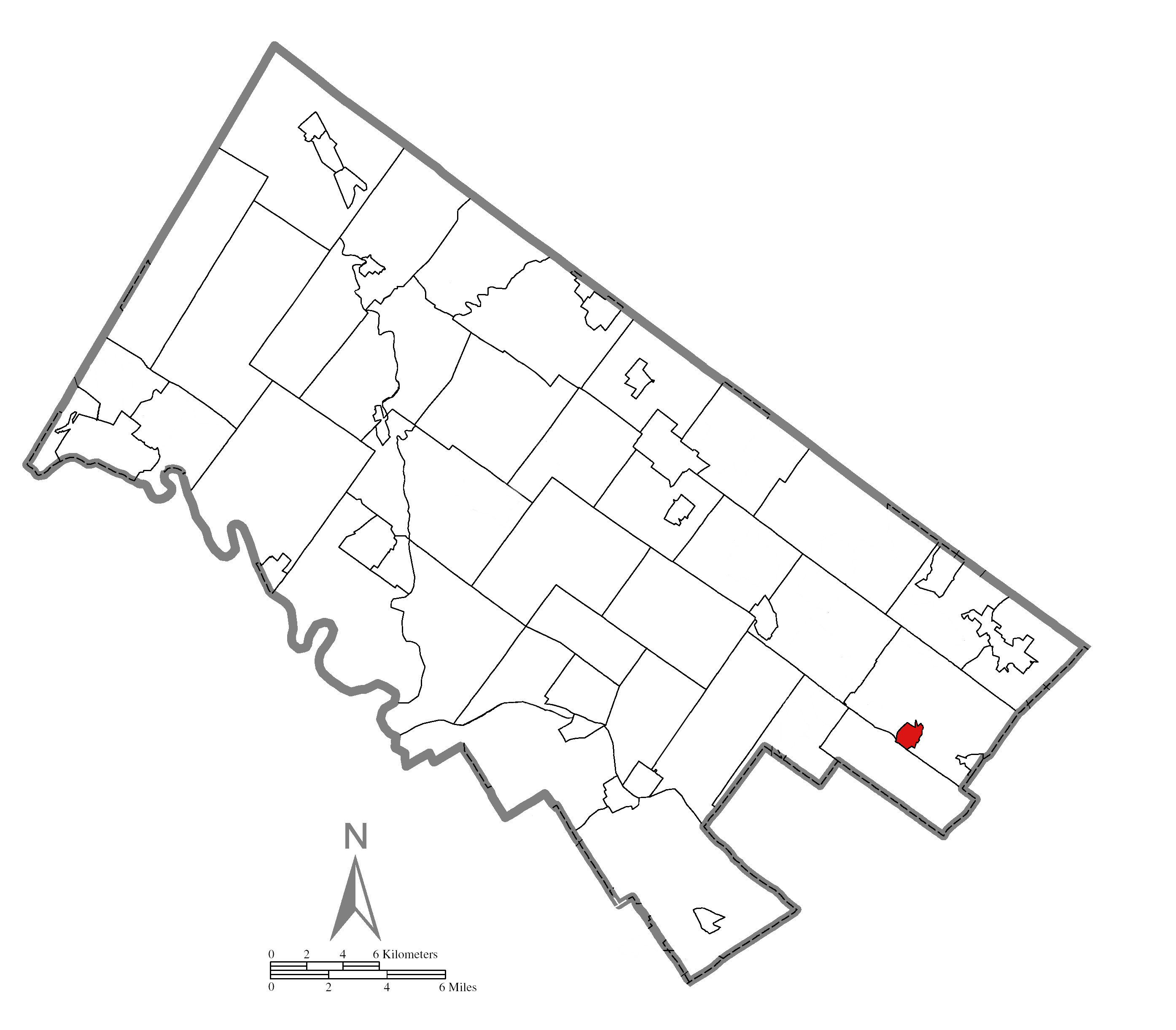
- Location of Jenkintown in Montgomery County, Pennsylvania
- Interactive map of Jenkintown, Pennsylvania
- Location of Jenkintown in Pennsylvania Jenkintown (the United States)
- Coordinates: 40.096°N 75.126°W
- Country: United States
- State: Pennsylvania
- County: Montgomery
- Incorporated: December 8, 1874

Government
  - Type: Council-manager
  - Mayor: Gabriel Lerman

Area
  - Total: 0.59 sq mi (1.52 km^{2})
  - Land: 0.59 sq mi (1.52 km^{2})
  - Water: 0 sq mi (0.00 km^{2})
- Elevation: 322 ft (98 m)

Population (2020)
  - Total: 4,719
  - Density: 8,046.8/sq mi (3,106.87/km^{2})
- Time zone: UTC-5 (EST)
  - Summer (DST): UTC-4 (EDT)
- ZIP Code: 19046
- Area codes: 215, 267 and 445
- FIPS code: 42-38000
- Website: jenkintownboro.com

Jenkintown is a borough in Montgomery County, Pennsylvania, United States. As of the 2020 census, Jenkintown had a population of 4,719. It is approximately 10 mi (16 km) north of Center City Philadelphia.

== History ==
The community was named after William Jenkins, a Welsh pioneer settler.

The borough was settled in about 1697 and incorporated on December 8, 1874, when approximately 248 acres (1.00 km^{2}) was taken from Abington Township. Today, the Borough is approximately 0.58 square miles (1.5 km^{2}) and is home to 4,500 residents.

Elements of the British army passed through Jenkintown en route to the Battle of White Marsh in early December 1777.

From the mid-1950s until the early 1980s, Jenkintown was a major retail hub for the northern suburbs of Philadelphia.

== Geography ==
Jenkintown is located just outside Philadelphia along the Route 611 corridor between Abington and Cheltenham Townships.

According to the U.S. Census Bureau, the borough has a total area of 0.6 square miles (1.6 km^{2}), all land. Jenkintown is surrounded by Abington Township to the north, west, and east, and borders Cheltenham Township to the south.

== Demographics ==
Historical population
Census	Pop.	Note	%±
1880	810		—
1890	1,609		98.6%
1900	2,091		30.0%
1910	2,968		41.9%
1920	3,366		13.4%
1930	4,797		42.5%
1940	5,024		4.7%
1950	5,130		2.1%
1960	5,017		−2.2%
1970	5,404		7.7%
1980	4,942		−8.5%
1990	4,574		−7.4%
2000	4,478		−2.1%
2010	4,422		−1.3%
2020	4,719		6.7%

=== 2020 census ===
As of the 2020 census, Jenkintown had a population of 4,719. The median age was 41.4 years. 22.4% of residents were under the age of 18 and 20.2% of residents were 65 years of age or older. For every 100 females there were 87.3 males, and for every 100 females age 18 and over there were 83.6 males age 18 and over.

100.0% of residents lived in urban areas, while 0.0% lived in rural areas.

There were 2,084 households in Jenkintown, of which 29.5% had children under the age of 18 living in them. Of all households, 41.8% were married-couple households, 18.2% were households with a male householder and no spouse or partner present, and 35.7% were households with a female householder and no spouse or partner present. About 38.4% of all households were made up of individuals and 19.3% had someone living alone who was 65 years of age or older.

There were 2,214 housing units, of which 5.9% were vacant. The homeowner vacancy rate was 0.4% and the rental vacancy rate was 5.2%.

Racial composition as of the 2020 census
Race	Number	Percent
White	3,839	81.4%
Black or African American	360	7.6%
American Indian and Alaska Native	4	0.1%
Asian	166	3.5%
Native Hawaiian and Other Pacific Islander	0	0.0%
Some other race	65	1.4%
Two or more races	285	6.0%
Hispanic or Latino (of any race)	210	4.5%

=== 2010 census ===
As of the 2010 census, the borough was 87.5% White, 5.7% Black or African American, 2.0% Asian, and 1.8% were two or more races. 3.0% of the population were of Hispanic or Latino ancestry.

=== 2000 census ===
As of the census of 2000, there were 4,478 people, 2,035 households, and 1,088 families residing in the borough. The population density was 7,844.0 inhabitants per square mile (3,028.6/km^{2}). There were 2,085 housing units at an average density of 3,652.2 per square mile (1,410.1/km^{2}). The racial makeup of the borough was 93.61% White, 4.00% African American, 0.04% Native American, 0.94% Asian, 0.02% Pacific Islander, 0.49% from other races, and 0.89% from two or more races. Hispanic or Latino people of any race were 1.30% of the population.

There were 2,035 households, out of which 24.3% had children under the age of 18 living with them, 42.2% were married couples living together, 8.6% had a female householder with no husband present, and 46.5% were non-families. 40.6% of all households were made up of individuals, and 19.3% had someone living alone who was 65 years of age or older. The average household size was 2.19 and the average family size was 3.08.

The age distribution of the borough's population is 22.9% under the age of 18, 5.6% from 18 to 24, 27.0% from 25 to 44, 23.5% from 45 to 64, and 21.0% who were 65 years of age or older. The median age was 42 years. For every 100 females, there were 78.9 males. For every 100 females age 18 and over, there were 73.2 males.

The median income for a household in the borough was $47,743, and the median income for a family was $72,902. Males had a median income of $41,970 versus $35,625 for females. The per capita income for the borough was $29,834. About 1.9% of families and 5.1% of the population were below the poverty line, including 3.6% of those under age 18 and 7.2% of those age 65 or over.

== Arts and culture ==
The Jenkins' Town Lyceum Building, Jenkintown-Wyncote station, and Strawbridge and Clothier Store are listed on the National Register of Historic Places.

WPHI-FM (103.9), the FM simulcast of all news radio station KYW (1060) in Philadelphia, is licensed to Jenkintown and does regularly cover events in the community.

== Government ==
Presidential election results
Year	Republican	Democratic
2020	19.7% 619	79.1% 2,481
2016	20.6% 563	74.9% 2,052
2012	27.1% 724	71.4% 1,905
2008	25.1% 708	73.8% 2,079
2004	28.6% 832	71.0% 2,068
2000	29.9% 791	65.7% 1,734

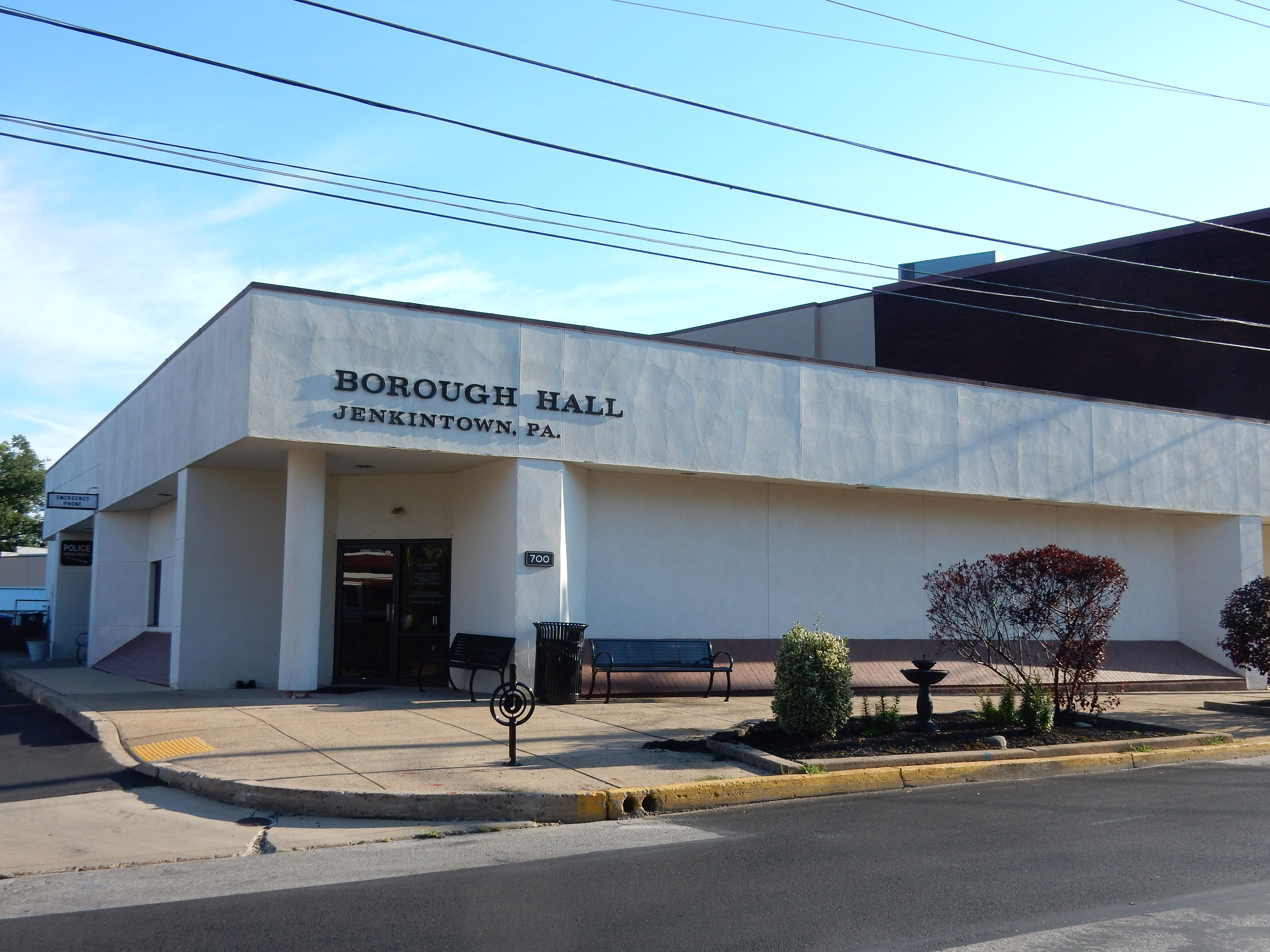
Jenkintown Borough Hall

Jenkintown has a city manager form of government with a mayor and a twelve-member borough council. The current mayor is Gabriel Lerman. Jay Conners is the president of the borough council, and Christian Soltysiak is vice president.

The borough is part of the Fourth Congressional District, represented by Madeleine Dean. At the state level, Jenkintown is part of the Pennsylvania's 154th Representative District, represented by Napoleon Nelson, and the 4th Senatorial District, represented by Arthur L. Haywood III. All are Democrats. Jenkintown, like its surroundings of Abington and Cheltenham and their included towns, votes overwhelmingly Democratic.

== Education ==
The Jenkintown School District includes Jenkintown Elementary School and Jenkintown Middle/High School. The district has an enrollment of over 700 students.

== Infrastructure ==
=== Transportation ===
==== Highways and roads ====
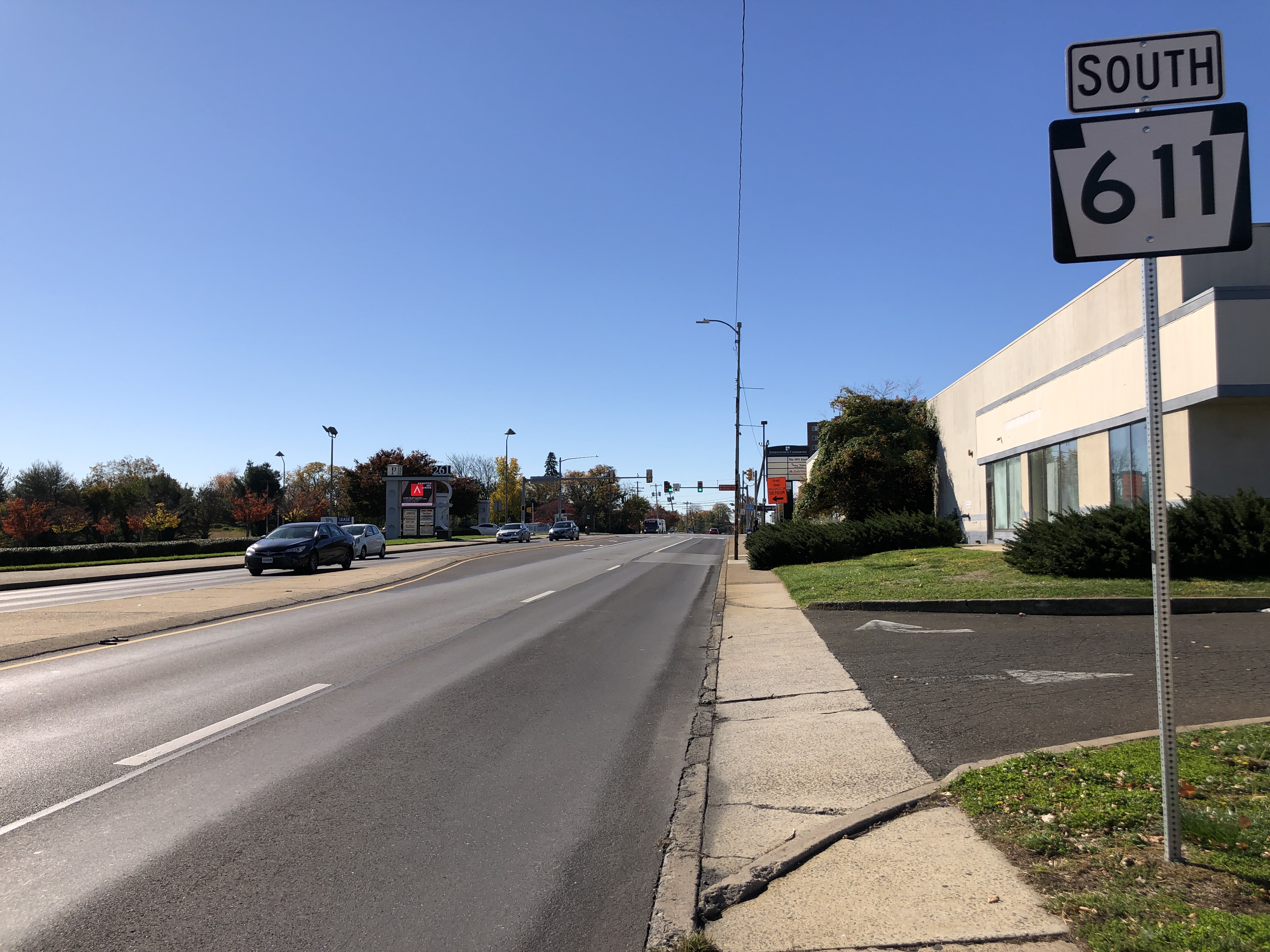
PA 611 southbound leaving Jenkintown

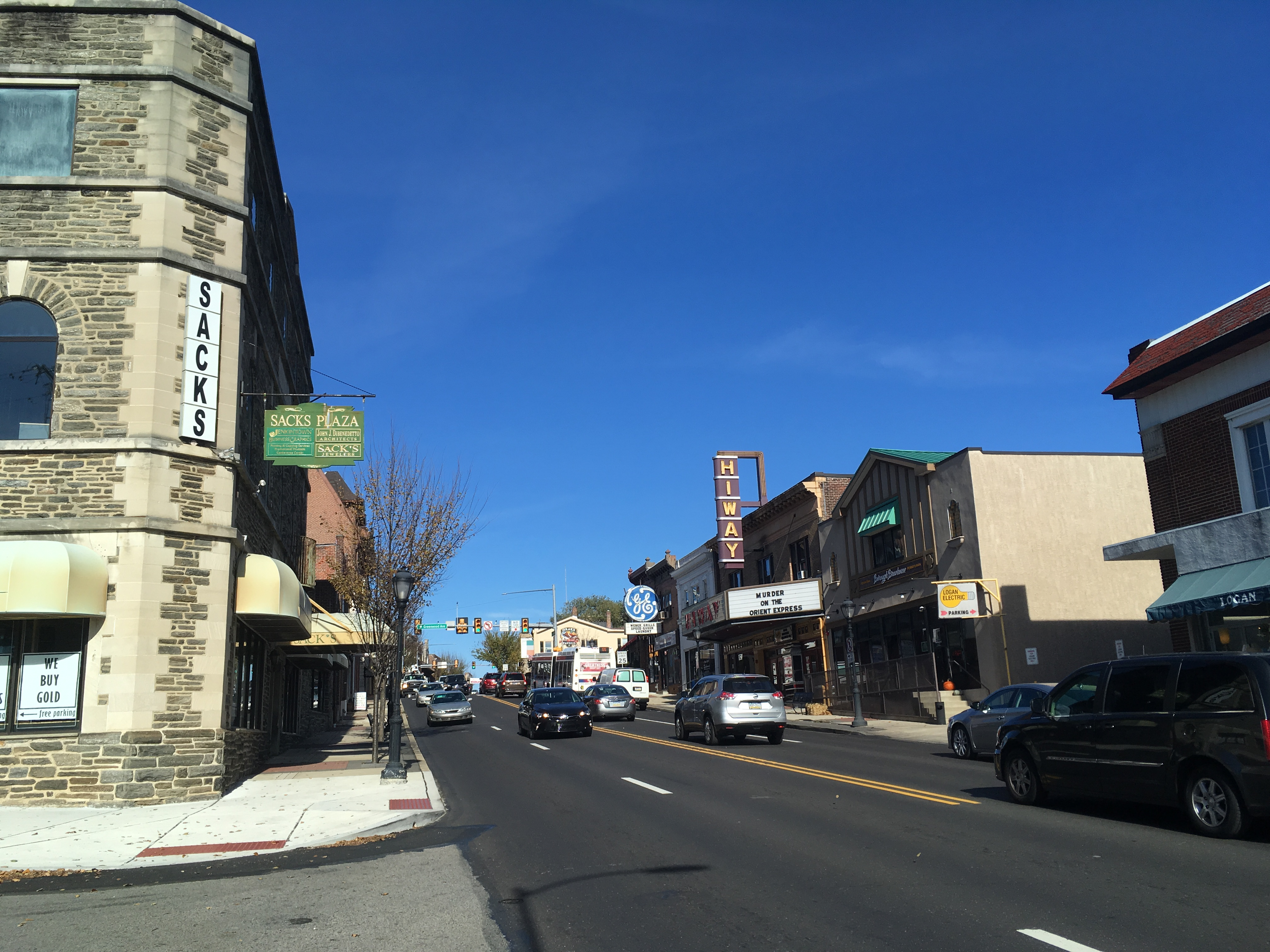
Old York Road, part of PA 611, northbound in Jenkintown

As of 2017 there were 12.30 miles (19.79 km) of public roads in Jenkintown, of which 1.50 miles (2.41 km) were maintained by the Pennsylvania Department of Transportation (PennDOT) and 10.80 miles (17.38 km) were maintained by the borough.

PA Route 611 heads north–south through Jenkintown along Old York Road, heading south to Philadelphia and north to Willow Grove, where it has an interchange with the Pennsylvania Turnpike and Doylestown. PA Route 73 passes east–west along the southern edge of Jenkintown along Washington Lane and Township Line Road, heading west to Wyncote and east to Northeast Philadelphia. Greenwood Avenue runs east–west through the center of Jenkintown, heading west to Wyncote.

==== Trains and buses ====
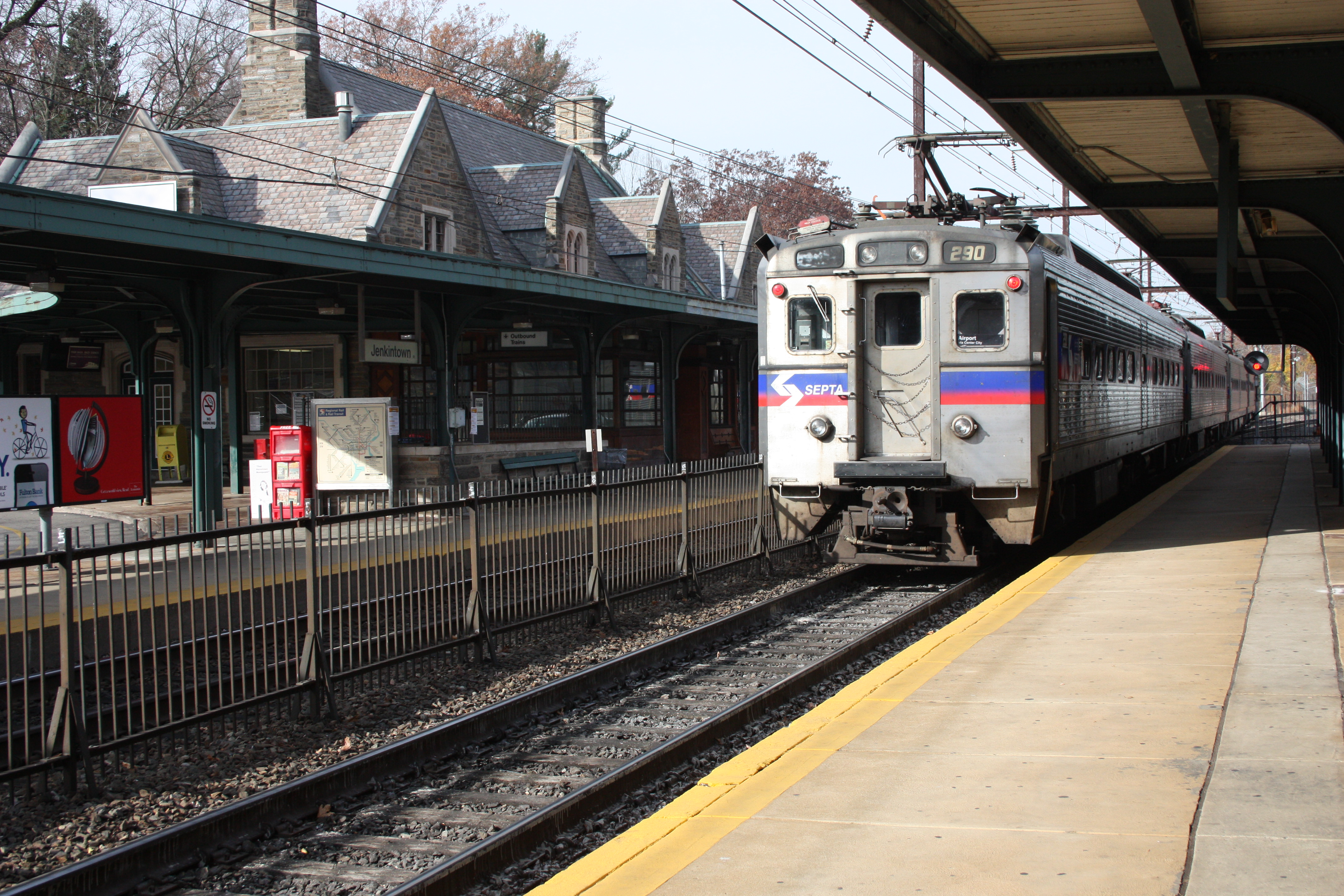
Jenkintown-Wyncote station of SEPTA Regional Rail

The Jenkintown-Wyncote station is one of SEPTA's major Regional Rail stops; the Lansdale/Doylestown Line, Warminster Line, and West Trenton Line regional rail services all stop there. Jenkintown-Wyncote station is the busiest SEPTA Regional Rail station outside the city of Philadelphia. The Jenkintown-Wyncote station building with its Queen Anne-style architecture was designed by famous Philadelphia architect Horace Trumbauer. SEPTA provides City Bus service to Jenkintown along Route 55, which follows PA 611 south to Olney Transportation Center in North Philadelphia and north to Willow Grove and Doylestown, and Route 77, which heads west to the Chestnut Hill section of Philadelphia and east to Northeast Philadelphia.

=== Fire department ===
The Jenkintown Fire Department consists of two fire companies founded more than 125 years ago. The Jenkintown Fire Department is a volunteer department consisting of the Pioneer Fire Company #1 and the Independent Fire Company #2. The Pioneer Company was organized in 1884 and the Independent Company was organized in 1889, an artifact of the historical split between Catholics and Protestants in the population of the borough. The two fire companies have a total membership of approximately 150, with 50 members composing the active firefighting crew.

== Notable people ==
- Friederike Baer, German-born award-winning American historian
- Bryan Cohen, American-Israeli basketball player
- Bradley Cooper, actor and filmmaker
- Lawrence Curry, educator and politician
- Wilmot E. Fleming, politician
- Adam F. Goldberg, television and film producer; creator of The Goldbergs, which is set in Jenkintown
- David Hungerford, cancer researcher, lived and died in Jenkintown
- Mark Khaisman, Ukrainian-born visual artist
- Mary Frances Lovell, writer, humanitarian, and temperance reformer
- Bernie Lemonick, football player and coach
- George Low Jr., professional golfer
- George Low Sr., professional golfer
- Carol Polis, professional boxing judge
- Ezra Pound, poet and critic
- Max Ritter, Olympic swimmer
- Lessing J. Rosenwald, former chairman and president of Sears
- Allyson Schwartz, politician
- Carl J. Seiberlich, naval aviator
- Jennifer Su, radio and television personality and singer
- Horace Trumbauer, architect during the American Gilded Age
- Glenn Wallis, author and musician
- John Wanamaker, merchant and religious, civic and political figure

== In popular culture ==
The television sitcom The Goldbergs is set in Jenkintown; it is based on the 1980s childhood of show creator Adam F. Goldberg, a Jenkintown native.

The events of Ann Patchett's 2019 novel The Dutch House are set mainly in Jenkintown, as well as in Elkins Park and Glenside, Pennsylvania.
