= Glenside, Pennsylvania =

Unincorporated community in Pennsylvania, US

Glenside
- Census-designated place Neighborhood of Cheltenham Township
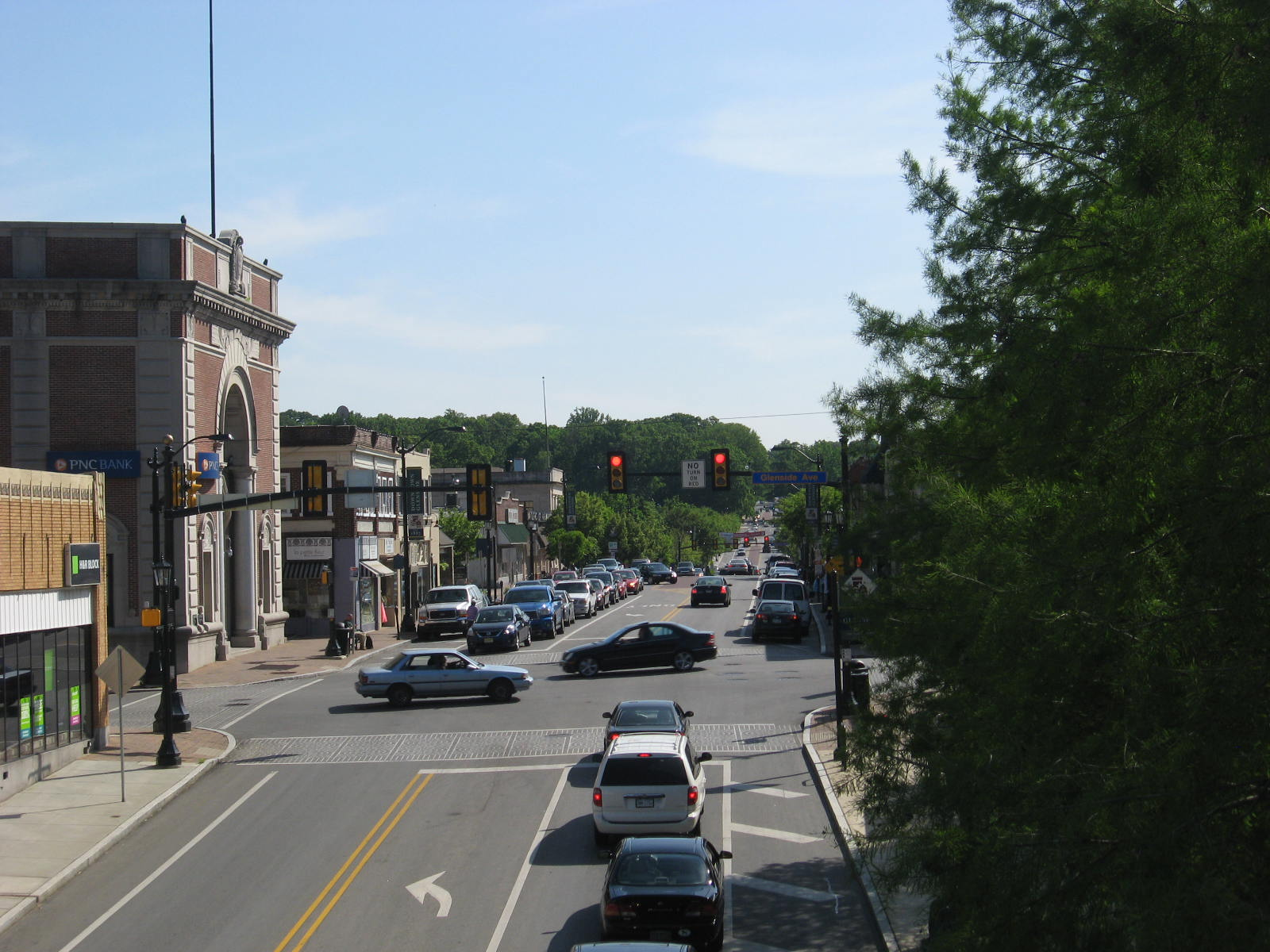
- Easton Road in Glenside

- Location of Glenside in Pennsylvania Glenside (the United States)
- Coordinates: 40°06′11″N 75°09′08″W
- Country: United States
- State: Pennsylvania
- County: Montgomery
- Townships: Abington, Cheltenham

Area
  - Total: 1.27 sq mi (3.29 km^{2})
  - Land: 1.27 sq mi (3.29 km^{2})
  - Water: 0 sq mi (0.00 km^{2})
- Elevation: 262 ft (80 m)

Population (2020)
  - Total: 7,737
  - Density: 6,085.0/sq mi (2,349.42/km^{2})
- Time zone: UTC-5 (Eastern Standard Time)
  - Summer (DST): UTC-4 (Eastern Daylight Time)
- ZIP Code: 19038
- Area code: 215
- Commissioners: J. Andrew Sharkey; Kathy A. Hampton (East)

Glenside is a census-designated place (CDP) located in Cheltenham Township and Abington Township in Montgomery County, Pennsylvania, United States. It borders Northwest Philadelphia. The population was 7,737 at the 2020 census on a land area of 1.3 square miles.

Glenside is most notable for its entertainment, including Keswick Theatre, restaurants, recreational facilities, and parks. Glenside station is one of the busiest in the SEPTA system. Glenside is located approximately eleven miles from Center City Philadelphia.

== History ==
A railroad station called Tacony Station was erected in 1855, named for Tacony Creek, which flows through the settlement. It was later called Abington Station. Glenside Post Office opened in 1888, and the railroad station was renamed Glenside station.

The Glenside Fire Company was established in 1900, and firefighting equipment was stored in a building until a firehouse was erected in 1907.

Glenside had two public schools: Glenside students living in Abington Township attended The Weldon School, and students in Cheltenham Township attended Glenside School, built in 1908. Glenside School was demolished in the 1960s.

In the early 1900s, Glenside had a "thriving business district" along Easton Road. A bank, Glenside Trust Company, opened in 1922.

== Geography ==
According to the U.S. Census Bureau, Glenside has a total area of 1.3 square miles (3.4 km^{2}), all land. Glenside is split into two townships: Abington Township, and Cheltenham Township. Cheltenham Township is the location of the United States Post Office, Glenside Library, and Glenside Memorial Hall.

=== Climate ===
Glenside has a four-season humid subtropical climate, bordering on humid continental, typical of the Northeast. The following is a chart of the average temperatures in Glenside.

Climate data for Glenside, Pennsylvania
Month	Jan	Feb	Mar	Apr	May	Jun	Jul	Aug	Sep	Oct	Nov	Dec	Year
Record high °F	73	73	88	95	96	102	102	102	98	88	82	76	102
Mean daily maximum °F	37	42	50	62	72	81	85	84	77	65	54	43	62.6
Mean daily minimum °F	19	24	32	41	51	62	67	65	56	43	34	26	43
Record low °F	−11	−3	−1	16	32	34	45	37	30	20	11	−10	−11
Average precipitation inches	3.44	3.01	4.32	4.12	4.37	4.6	5.05	3.98	4.53	3.82	3.94	4.23	49.4
Record high °C	23	23	31	35	36	39	39	39	37	31	28	24	39
Mean daily maximum °C	3	6	10	17	22	27	29	29	25	18	12	6	17.0
Mean daily minimum °C	−7	−4	0	5	11	17	19	18	13	6	1	−3	6
Record low °C	−24	−19	−18	−9	0	1	7	3	−1	−7	−12	−23	−24
Average precipitation mm	87	76	110	105	111	120	128	101	115	97	100	107	1,250
Source: The Weather Channel "Average Weather for Glenside, PA". The Weather Channel. Archived from the original on March 5, 2010.

== Demographics ==
Historical population
Census	Pop.	Note	%±
1990	8,704		—
2000	7,914		−9.1%
2010	8,384		5.9%
2020	7,737		−7.7%

As of the 2020 census, the CDP was 91.0% White, 5.3% Black or African American, 1.0% Asian, and 1.6% were two or more races.

As of the 2010 census, the CDP was 85.4% White, 7.2% Black or African American, 0.2% Native American, 2.8% Asian, 1.0% were Some Other Race, and 1.7% were two or more races. 2.9% of the population were of Hispanic or Latino ancestry.

As of the census of 2000, there were 7,914 people, 3,103 households, and 2,013 families residing in the CDP. The population density was 6,217.4 inhabitants per square mile (2,400.6/km^{2}). There were 3,181 housing units at an average density of 2,499.1 per square mile (964.9/km^{2}). The racial makeup of the CDP was 88.97% White, 6.66% African American, 0.10% Native American, 3.02% Asian, 0.03% Pacific Islander, 0.27% from other races, and 0.96% from two or more races. Hispanic or Latino of any race were 1.44% of the population.

There were 3,103 households, out of which 31.3% had children under the age of 18 living with them, 52.7% were married couples living together, 9.2% had a female householder with no husband present, and 35.1% were non-families. 28.8% of all households were made up of individuals, and 9.7% had someone living alone who was 65 years of age or older. The average household size was 2.54 and the average family size was 3.21.

In the CDP, the population was spread out, with 25.0% under the age of 18, 8.0% from 18 to 24, 30.8% from 25 to 44, 22.3% from 45 to 64, and 13.8% who were 65 years of age or older. The median age was 36 years. For every 100 females, there were 91.3 males. For every 100 females age 18 and over, there were 87.3 males.

The median income for a household in the CDP was $58,868, and the median income for a family was $74,025. Males had a median income of $48,378 versus $35,629 for females. The per capita income for the CDP was $26,393. About 1.6% of families and 3.4% of the population were below the poverty line, including 2.4% of those under age 18 and 3.6% of those age 65 or over.

== Economy ==
Newgrounds, an entertainment website, is headquartered in Glenside.

== Arts and culture ==
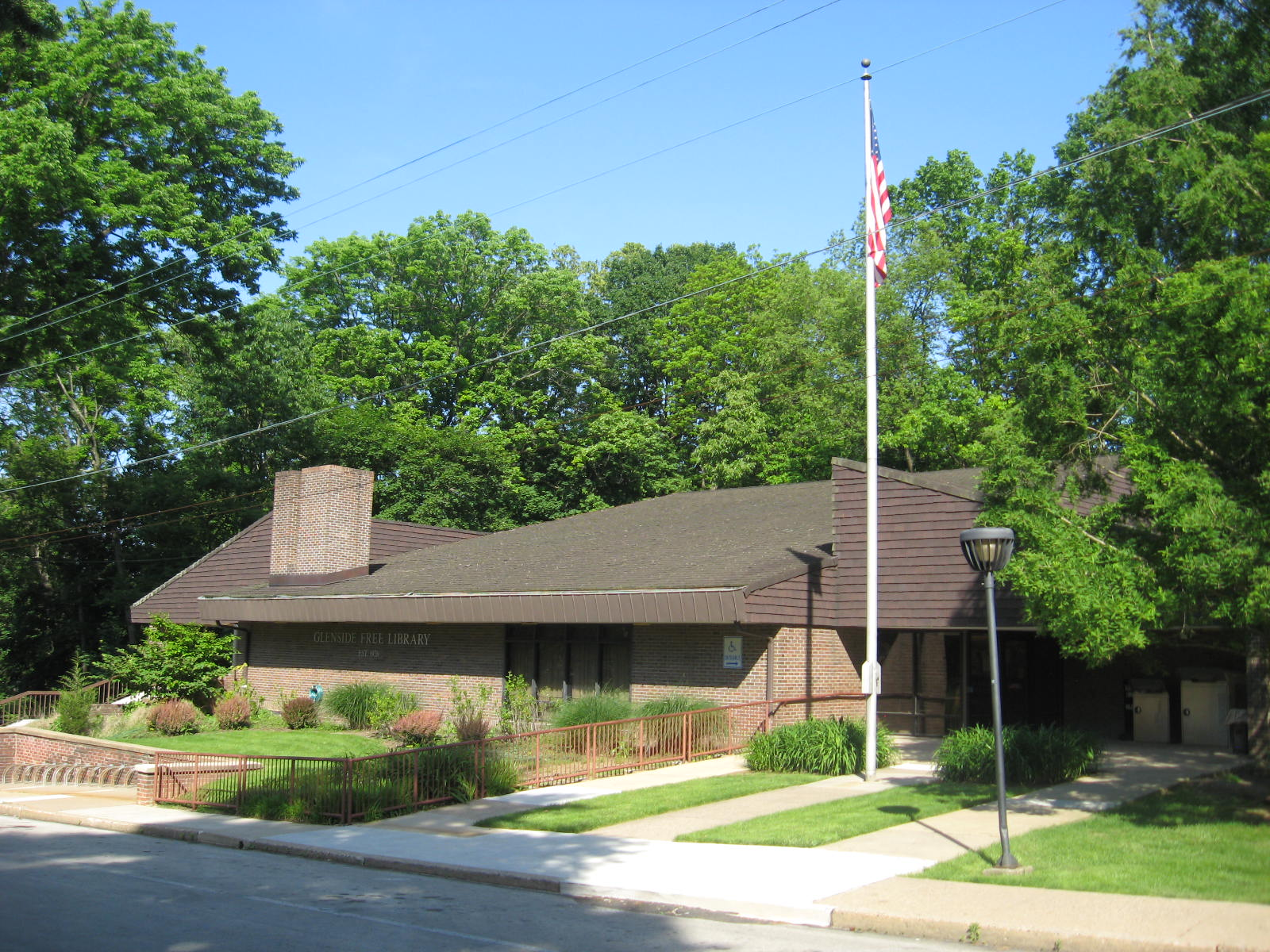
Glenside Free Library

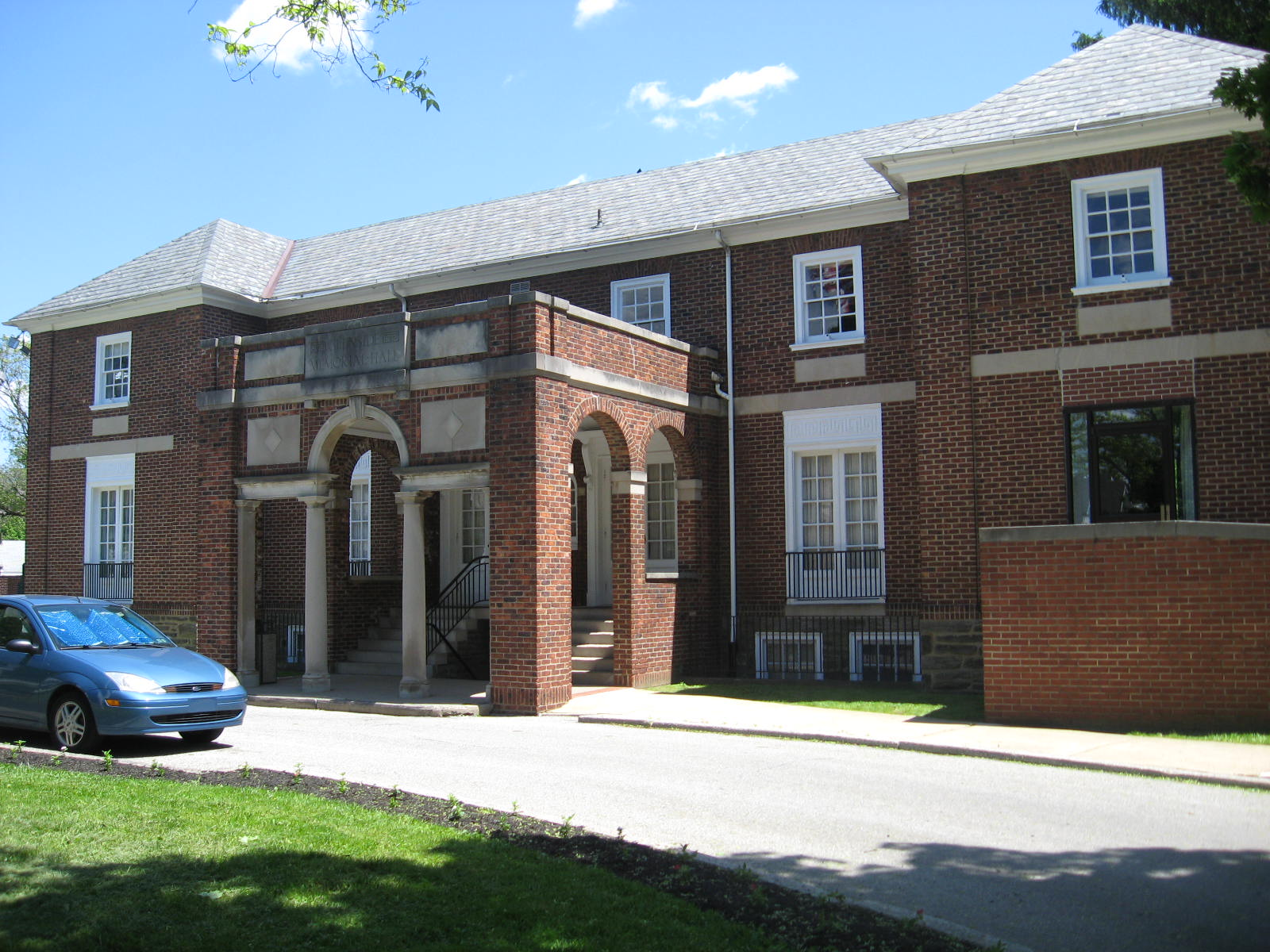
Glenside Memorial Hall

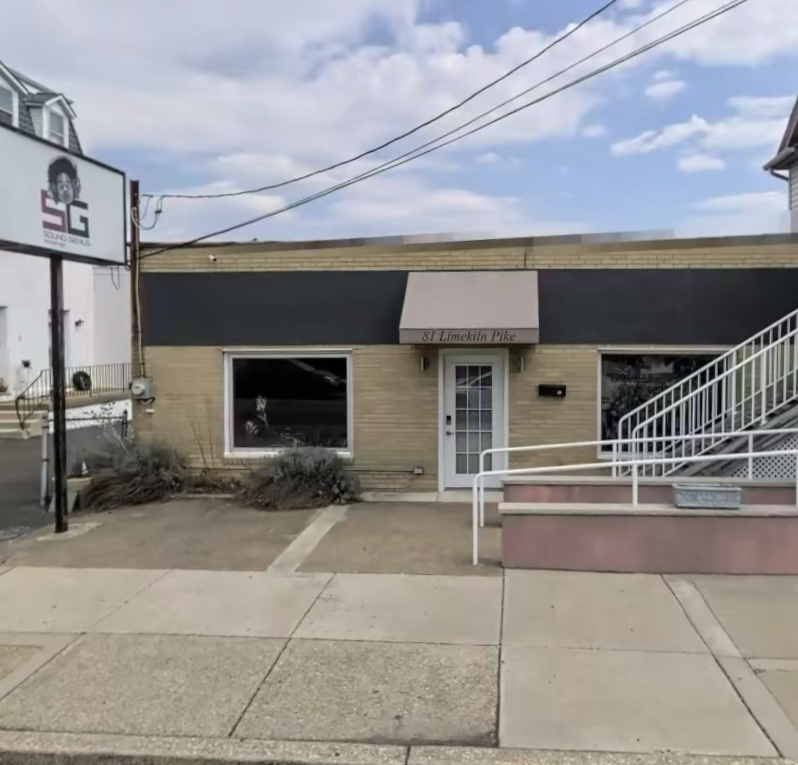
Sound Genius Recordings

=== Independence Day Parade ===
The annual Independence Day parade held in Glenside was founded in 1904.

=== Points of interest ===
- Glenside Free Library, established in 1928.
- Keswick Theatre, built in 1928, hosts entertainers and shows. It was added to the National Register of Historic Places in 1983.
- Keswick Village, a cultural hub and center of commerce.
- Downtown has businesses and restaurants.
- Glenside Memorial Hall, dedicated to World War I veterans, can accommodate up to 180 people. It was listed on the National Register of Historic Places in 2004.
- Sound Genius Recordings, State of the art recording facility, Home of the innovative sound.

== Parks and recreation ==
- Parks include Harry Renninger Park, Grove Park, and Penbryn Park.
- Glenside Pool was reconstructed in 1967.

== Education ==
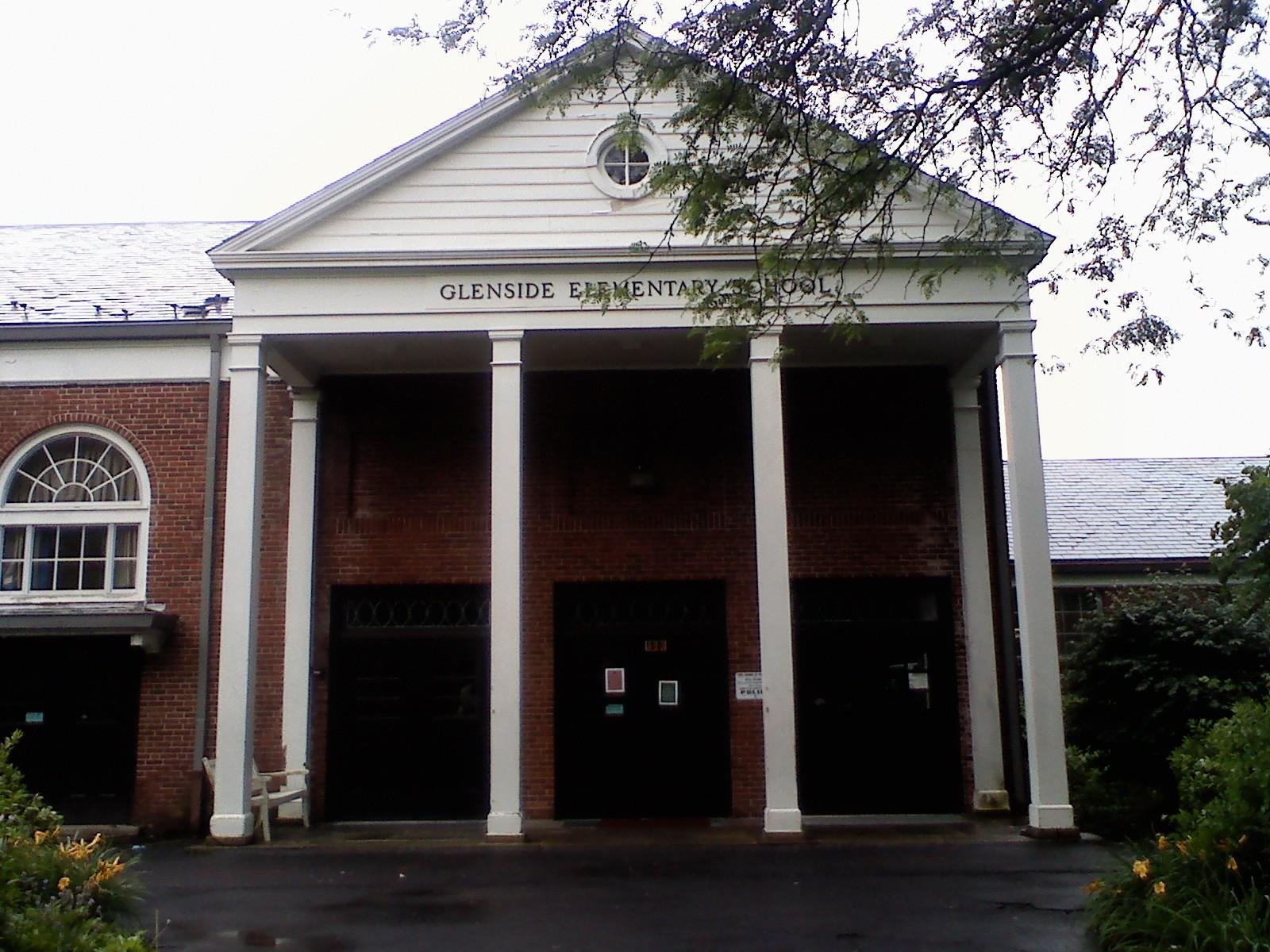
Glenside Elementary, completed in 2011

Cheltenham Township School District operates one school in Glenside, Glenside Elementary. Abington School District operates one school in Glenside, Copper Beech Elementary.

Saint Luke Catholic School in Glenside is a parochial school, part of St. Luke The Evangelist Roman Catholic Church, with approximately 315 students in 2019.

Arcadia University is found in Glenside, as well as Westminster Theological Seminary, a Protestant theological seminary.

== Media ==
Glenside is served by two weekly newspapers: Times Chronicle and Glenside News, both papers a division of Montgomery News.

== Infrastructure ==
=== Transportation ===
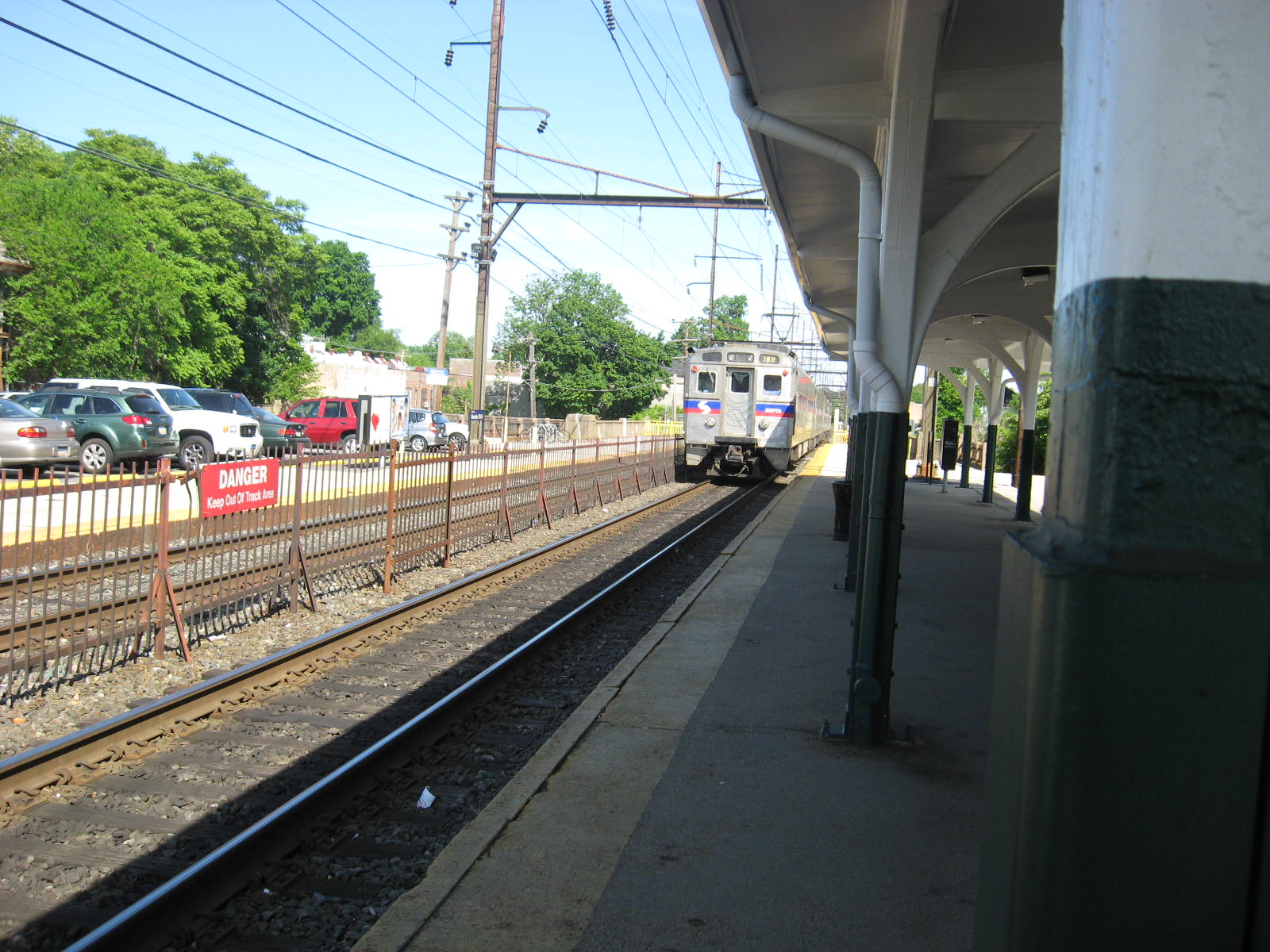
A SEPTA Main Line train pulling out of Glenside

==== SEPTA ====
Glenside is served by SEPTA Regional Railroad at the Glenside station, originally known as Abington Station, whose roots date back to the North Pennsylvania Railroad and the Reading Railroad. Glenside is also served by SEPTA buses.

==== Roads ====
- Pennsylvania Route 73; in Glenside, it is known as Church Road.
- Pennsylvania Route 309
- Pennsylvania Route 152

== Notable people ==
- Johnny Callison, professional baseball player for Philadelphia Phillies and Chicago Cubs
- George Castle, son of J.R. Castle, lacrosse player for Philadelphia Wings
- J.R. Castle, former lacrosse player
- Clay Dalrymple, professional baseball player for Philadelphia Phillies and Baltimore Orioles
- Madeleine Dean, United States Congresswoman
- Tony Donatelli, soccer player for Charleston Battery
- Ray Ellis, artist
- Bill Hyndman, amateur golfer
- Florence LaRue, singer and original member of the 5th Dimension, lived in Glenside for a while when she was young.
- Peter Lillback, theologian who is president and Professor of Historical Theology and Church History at Westminster Theological Seminary
- Jillian Mele, host at Fox News
- Jerry Oleksiak, Pennsylvania Secretary of Labor and Industry
- Bob Perkins, radio host at WRTI
- Jesse Purnell, professional baseball player for Philadelphia Phillies
- Michael Siani, professional baseball player for St. Louis Cardinals
- Russell Swan, Survivor contestant
- Richard Ward, actor
- George Wilson, College Football Hall of Fame football player

== In popular culture ==
The events of Ann Patchett's 2019 novel The Dutch House are set in Glenside, as well as in Jenkintown and Elkins Park, Pennsylvania.
