= KDMA =

KDMA may refer to:

- KDMA (AM), a radio station (1460 AM) licensed to serve Montevideo, Minnesota, United States
- KDMA-FM, a radio station (93.9 FM) licensed to serve Granite Falls, Minnesota
- Davis–Monthan Air Force Base (ICAO code KDMA), a United States Air Force base
