= Nellie Moyer Budd =

American music teacher

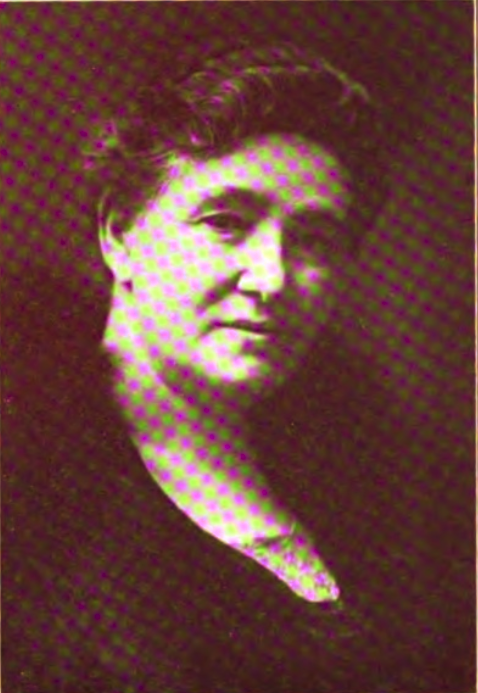
- Born: Cornelia Margaret Moyer; February 20, 1860; Sanborn, New York, U.S.
- Died: November 28, 1944 (aged 84); Montevideo, Minnesota, U.S.
- Other names: nickname, "Nellie"
- Education: New England Conservatory of Music
- Occupation: music teacher
- Employer: Windom College
- Spouse: Charles Henry Budd (m. 1889; died 1929)
- Relatives: Lycurgus Rose Moyer (brother)

Nellie Moyer Budd (February 20, 1860 - November 28, 1944) was an American music teacher. Trained at the New England Conservatory of Music, she served for many years as the head of the music department at Windom College, Montevideo, Minnesota.

== Early life and education ==
Cornelia (nickname, "Nellie") Margaret Moyer was born in Sanborn, Niagara County, New York, February 20, 1860. Her father, Amos F. Moyer, was a descendant of the Moyer family of Central New York; her mother, Cornelia V. Rose, was a descendant from Robert Rose who came to Wethersfield, Connecticut, in 1634. Her siblings were: Lycuagus Rose Moyer, Mary Elizabeth Moyer, Frank James Moyer, Lloyd Garrison Moyer, and Galen Delos Moyer.

Nellie graduated from Lockport Union School (1879) and the New England Conservatory of Music (1886). In Boston, she had a course of music study under George Whitefield Chadwick, Dr. Louis Maas, Stephen A. Emery, Carl Baermann and Signor Augusto Rotoli. In Chicago, she studied under William Hall Sherwood, and voice with J. Harry Wheeler.

Music study attracted her to Chautauqua, New York, for seven summers, and one season to Ocean Grove, New Jersey.

== Career ==
Budd taught music for many years including in Niagara County, New York. In Minnesota, she was the head of the department of music at the Western Minnesota Seminary (later Windom College) (1887-1913).

She was a charter member of the Minnesota Music Teachers Association, serving two years as its vice president, and was a member of the organization's original committee on state standardization of music teachers. She was also an active member of the National Education Association since 1900.

Budd served as deputy judge of probate for her brother, Lycurgus Rose Moyer, and assisted him in abstract work, working at Chippewa County Bank when that institution was first established. She was early on the librarian of the public library, started by Charles H. Budd in 1879 and the continued as a member of the library board. She served as president of the Minnesota Rebekah Assembly for one year. For 24 years, she was a director of the Odd Fellows Home at Northfield, Minnesota much of that time being vice president of the board.

== Personal life ==
In Montevideo, she married Charles Henry Budd (1848–1929), December 25, 1889. They had four children: Mary Ethel Budd (1879–1965), Windom Moyer Budd (1891–1954), Raymond Budd (1894–1981), and Charles Henry Budd, Jr. (1899–1971). While her three sons were in World War I, she worked as cashier of the Montevideo State Bank. Her war work was county chair of the Women's Liberty Loan.

Nellie Moyer Budd died at Montevideo, November 28, 1944.
