= KKRC =

KKRC may refer to:

- KKRC-FM, a radio station (97.3 FM) licensed to serve Sioux Falls, South Dakota, United States
- KJEF (AM), a defunct radio station (1290 AM) formerly licensed to serve Jennings, Louisiana, United States, which held the call sign KKRC from 2019 to 2020
- KDMA-FM, a radio station (93.9 FM) licensed to serve Granite Falls, Minnesota, United, States, which held the call sign KKRC from 1990 to 2018
- KRRO, a radio station (103.7 FM) licensed to serve Sioux Falls, South Dakota, which held the call sign KKRC-FM from 1982 to 1990
