= Kasson, Minnesota =

City in Minnesota, United States

Kasson
- City
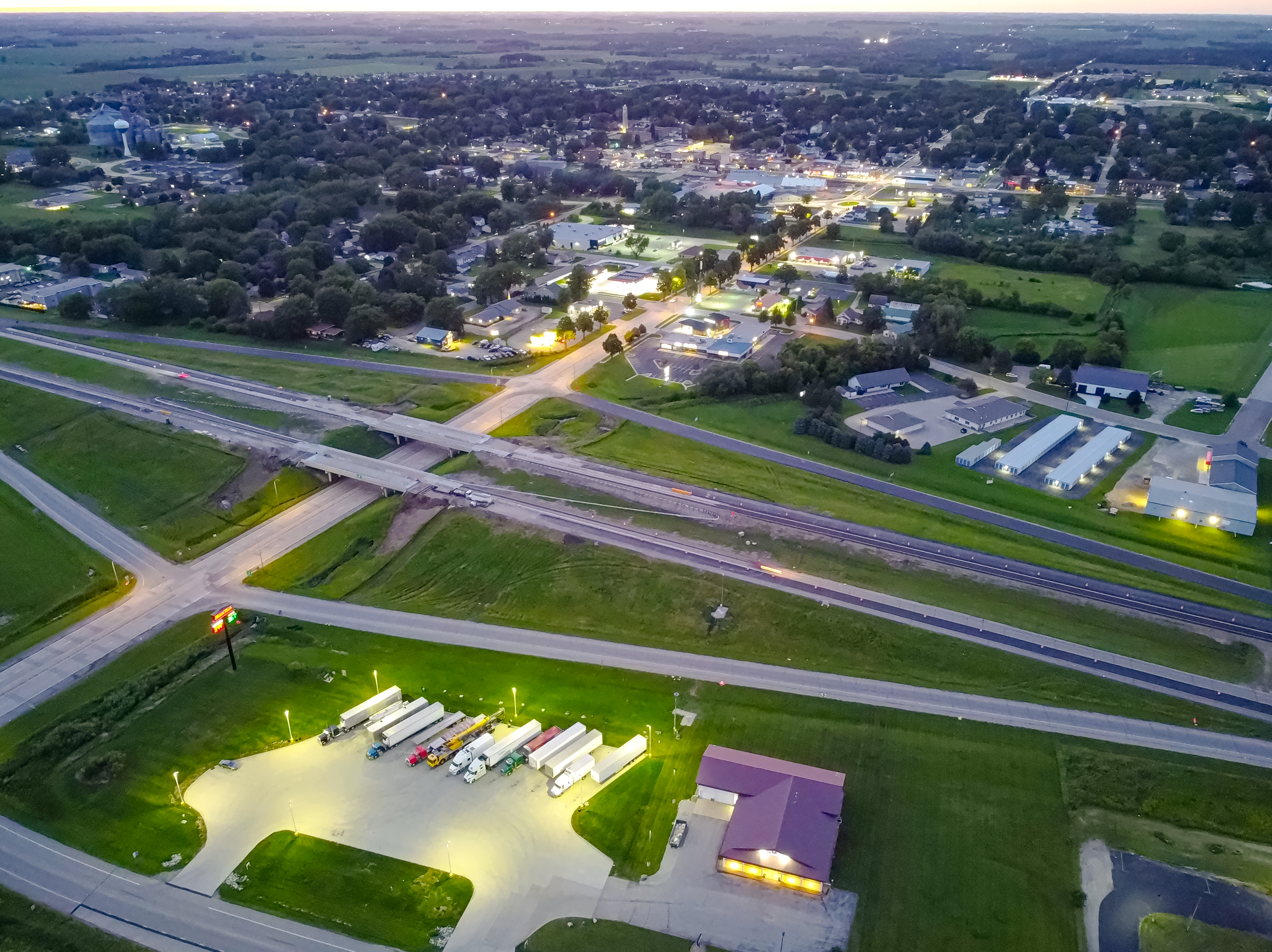
- US-14 and MN-57 junction in town
- Motto: "We're Ready For You"
- Location of Kasson within Dodge County and state of Minnesota
- Coordinates: 44°01′54″N 92°45′12″W
- Country: United States
- State: Minnesota
- County: Dodge

Area
  - Total: 3.04 sq mi (7.88 km^{2})
  - Land: 3.04 sq mi (7.88 km^{2})
  - Water: 0 sq mi (0.00 km^{2})
- Elevation: 1,263 ft (385 m)

Population (2020)
  - Total: 6,851
  - Density: 2,253.2/sq mi (869.96/km^{2})
- Time zone: UTC-6 (Central (CST))
  - Summer (DST): UTC-5 (CDT)
- ZIP code: 55944
- Area code: 507
- FIPS code: 27-32498
- GNIS feature ID: 2395495
- Website: https://www.cityofkasson.gov/

Kasson (/ˈkæsən/ KASS-ən) is a city in Dodge County, Minnesota, United States. The population was 6,851 at the 2020 census. Kasson is 13 miles (21 km) west of Rochester along U.S. Highway 14 and is one of the endpoints of Minnesota State Highway 57. The Dakota, Minnesota and Eastern Railroad's main freight rail line also runs through the city. Kasson shares a school system with nearby Mantorville (the "K–M Komets"). The K–M school system is a member of the Zumbro Education school district (ZED). Kasson is part of the Rochester, MN Metropolitan Statistical Area.

== History ==
According to Warren Upham, superintendent of the Minnesota Historical Society from 1896 to 1934, the city of Kasson was incorporated on February 24, 1870, and again on April 22, 1916, separating from the township on March 21, 1917. The town was named after Jabez Hyde Kasson, owner of the original townsite. Kasson was born on January 17, 1820, and moved to Minnesota in 1856. He settled on a farm in the township, and laid out the village along with others. The plat was recorded on October 13, 1865. It had a station of the Chicago and North Western Transportation Company, and its post office opened in 1866.

== Geography ==
According to the United States Census Bureau, the city has an area of 3.00 square miles (7.77 km^{2}), all land. Kasson is 15 miles (24 km) west of Rochester, and three miles (5 km) south of Mantorville.

== Demographics ==
Historical population
Census	Pop.	Note	%±
1870	515		—
1880	1,054		104.7%
1890	992		−5.9%
1900	1,112		12.1%
1910	932		−16.2%
1920	1,150		23.4%
1930	1,019		−11.4%
1940	1,230		20.7%
1950	1,353		10.0%
1960	1,732		28.0%
1970	1,883		8.7%
1980	2,827		50.1%
1990	3,514		24.3%
2000	4,398		25.2%
2010	5,931		34.9%
2020	6,851		15.5%
U.S. Decennial Census

=== 2020 census ===
As of the 2020 census, Kasson had a population of 6,851. The median age was 35.4 years. 28.8% of residents were under the age of 18 and 13.6% of residents were 65 years of age or older. For every 100 females there were 97.8 males, and for every 100 females age 18 and over there were 93.7 males age 18 and over.

99.7% of residents lived in urban areas, while 0.3% lived in rural areas.

There were 2,590 households in Kasson, of which 39.2% had children under the age of 18 living in them. Of all households, 55.9% were married-couple households, 13.9% were households with a male householder and no spouse or partner present, and 22.3% were households with a female householder and no spouse or partner present. About 23.3% of all households were made up of individuals and 12.1% had someone living alone who was 65 years of age or older.

There were 2,653 housing units, of which 2.4% were vacant. The homeowner vacancy rate was 0.4% and the rental vacancy rate was 5.4%.

Racial composition as of the 2020 census
Race	Number	Percent
White	6,288	91.8%
Black or African American	50	0.7%
American Indian and Alaska Native	12	0.2%
Asian	35	0.5%
Native Hawaiian and Other Pacific Islander	0	0.0%
Some other race	106	1.5%
Two or more races	360	5.3%
Hispanic or Latino (of any race)	307	4.5%

=== 2010 census ===
As of the census of 2010, there were 5,931 people, 2,224 households, and 1,569 families residing in the city. The population density was 1,977.0 inhabitants per square mile (763.3/km^{2}). There were 2,340 housing units at an average density of 780.0 per square mile (301.2/km^{2}). The racial makeup of the city was 96.0% White, 0.4% African American, 0.3% Native American, 0.5% Asian, 1.2% from other races, and 1.6% from two or more races. Hispanic or Latino people of any race were 4.2% of the population.

There were 2,224 households, of which 41.3% had children under the age of 18 living with them, 56.0% were married couples living together, 9.3% had a female householder with no husband present, 5.2% had a male householder with no wife present, and 29.5% were non-families. 25.2% of all households were made up of individuals, and 11.1% had someone living alone who was 65 years of age or older. The average household size was 2.65 and the average family size was 3.18.

The median age in the city was 33.1 years. 31.3% of residents were under the age of 18; 6.7% were between the ages of 18 and 24; 29.7% were from 25 to 44; 21% were from 45 to 64; and 11.3% were 65 years of age or older. The gender makeup of the city was 48.6% male and 51.4% female.

=== 2000 census ===
As of the census of 2000, there were 4,398 people, 1,678 households, and 1,179 families residing in the city. The population density was 2,170.4 inhabitants per square mile (838.0/km^{2}). There were 1,711 housing units at an average density of 844.4 per square mile (326.0/km^{2}). The racial makeup of the city was 97.29% White, 0.39% African American, 0.02% Native American, 0.50% Asian, 1.41% from other races, and 0.39% from two or more races. Hispanic or Latino people of any race were 2.30% of the population.

There were 1,678 households, out of which 40.2% had children under the age of 18 living with them, 57.6% were married couples living together, 8.8% had a female householder with no husband present, and 29.7% were non-families. 24.2% of all households were made up of individuals, and 12.2% had someone living alone who was 65 years of age or older. The average household size was 2.62 and the average family size was 3.12.

In the city, the population was spread out, with 30.4% under the age of 18, 8.0% from 18 to 24, 32.2% from 25 to 44, 17.5% from 45 to 64, and 12.0% who were 65 years of age or older. The median age was 33 years. For every 100 females, there were 94.1 males. For every 100 females age 18 and over, there were 92.3 males.

The median income for a household in the city was $49,022, and the median income for a family was $55,880. Males had a median income of $36,045 versus $25,810 for females. The per capita income for the city was $19,249. About 2.5% of families and 4.2% of the population were below the poverty line, including 3.5% of those under age 18 and 8.0% of those age 65 or over.

== Government ==
The City of Kasson has a city council/city administrator form of government with a mayor and four city council members.

Two council members and the mayor are elected every two years via a citywide vote. Among its primary duties, the City Council makes laws, sets policies, adopts budgets and oversees a wide-ranging agenda for the community. The City Administrator is appointed by the City Council to implement these initiatives. This official heads the administrative branch of city government and directs all city operations, projects, and programs.

Various advisory boards and commissions provide information and make recommendations to the City Council. These include the Planning and Zoning Commission, the Park & Recreation Commission, the Economic Development Authority, and the Library Board.

== Historic 1918 Kasson Public School ==
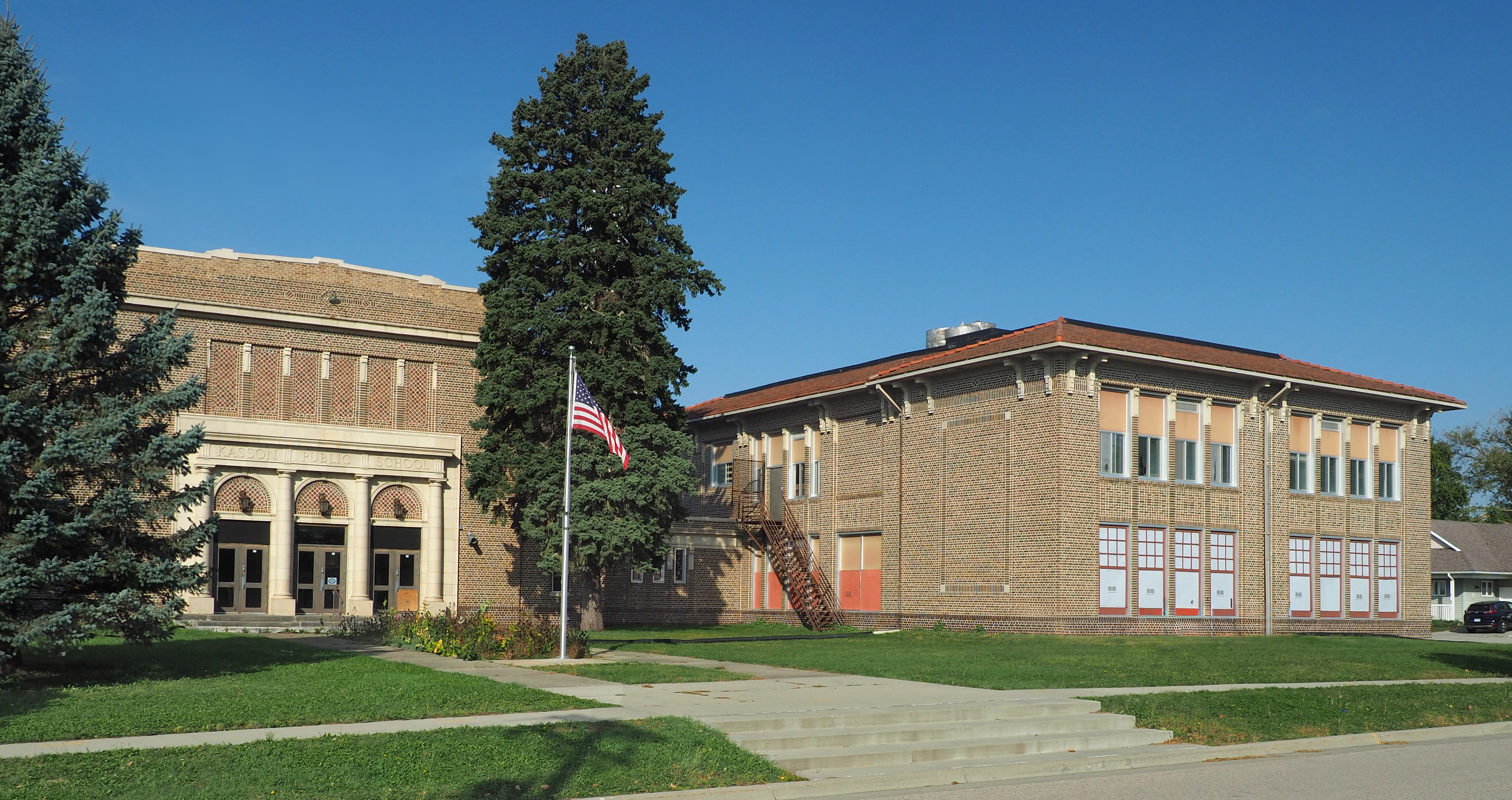
Kasson Public School

Due to efforts of Kasson's nonprofit historic preservation group Kasson Alliance for Restoration (KARE), the Kasson Public School building has been placed on the National Register of Historic Places. Kasson's elementary and high school students began using the building on December 5, 1918. The school's nomination to the National Register was approved on December 6, 2007.

The school joins the Jacob Leuthold Jr. House, the Eureka Hotel, the Kasson Municipal Building, and the Kasson Water Tower on the list of Kasson's buildings on the National Register of Historic Places.

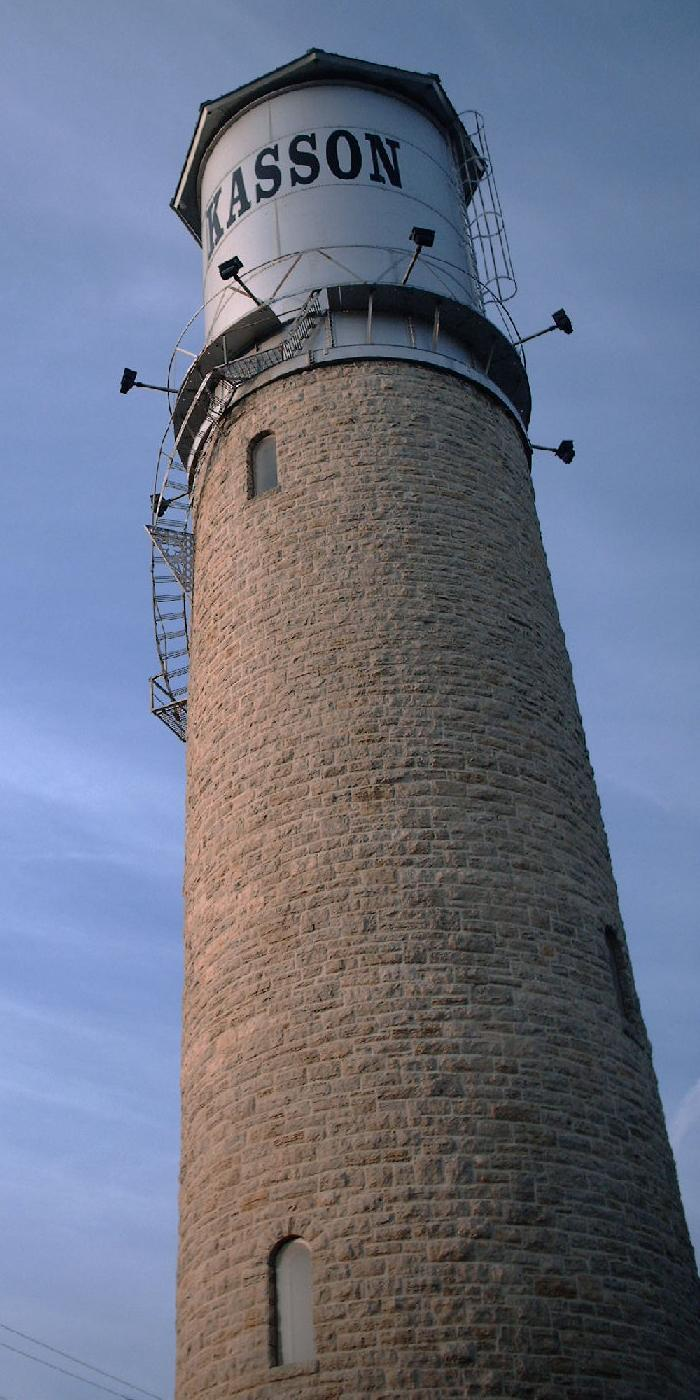
Kasson Water Tower in 2006 (built 1895)

KARE and the City of Kasson co-sponsored a Historic Properties Reuse Study to investigate ways to use the Kasson Public School building. The Reuse Study Report was published in October 2009. A citizen task force formed in November 2009 and began meeting in January 2010 to investigate the adaptive reuses options the report outlined, which included a survey distributed to all of Kasson's 5,000 citizens. 581 citizens responded. In May 2010, the Task Force presented the survey results to the City Council. 58% of the respondents favored rehabilitating or reusing the school. At an August 2010 city council meeting, Mayor Tim Tjosaas asked the council to form a Library Building Committee (LBC) composed of citizen volunteers; this was approved. The LBC began meeting in September 2010.

In February 2011, the LBC announced that it had met with Deb Parrott of the engineering and architecture firm Widseth, Smith, Nolting and Associates. Parrott, who has experience with library design, was asked to prepare three library design proposals for the historic school, as follows: total rehabilitation of the 1918 school building; a partial or modified rehabilitation of the school building; and a completely new structure on the existing building's general footprint (after demolition of the 1918 school). KARE rejected all three proposals and the building sits vacant to this day.

== Festival ==
Kasson is known for its annual Festival in the Park celebration in August, a volunteer-organized weekend with events celebrating the town's heritage and bringing community members together. The festival began in 1991 and has grown over the years, including traditional events like a parade, a fireworks display, and the "Miss Kasson" ceremony, which was recently changed to "Kasson Ambassador", allowing men to take part. More recent events include a bellyflop contest, an eating contest, and a musical showcase. The festival takes place the second weekend in August at the North Park.

== Notable people ==
- H. H. Atherton, Minnesota state senator; lived in Kasson
- Philip S. Duff, Minnesota state legislator and newspaper editor
- Alfred M. Falkenhagen, Minnesota state legislator and farmer
- Peg Lynch, radio and early television personality; raised in Kasson

== See also ==
- Kasson Public Library
