= Alfred M. Falkenhagen =

American politician (1898–1968)

Alfred M. Falkenhagen (September 24, 1898 – April 24, 1968) was an American farmer and politician.

Falkenhagen was born in Montevideo, Chippewa County, Minnesota. He went to the Montevideo public schools and to the University of Minnesota College of Agriculture. Falkenhagen served in the United States Army during World War I. He lived in Kasson, Dodge County, Minnesota with his wife and family and was a cattle farmer. Falkenhagen served in the Minnesota House of Representatives from 1961 until his death in 1968.
