= KMGM =

American radio station in Minnesota, US

- Montevideo, Minnesota; United States
- Frequency: 105.5 MHz
- Branding: Bigfoot 105.5 FM

Programming
- Format: Classic rock
- Affiliations: Minnesota Twins

Ownership
- Owner: Iowa City Broadcasting Company
- Sister stations: KDMA, KDMA-FM

History
- First air date: October 1982

Technical information
- Licensing authority: FCC
- Facility ID: 18046
- Class: A
- ERP: 3,000 watts
- HAAT: 90 meters (300 ft)
- Transmitter coordinates: 44°51′24″N 95°37′46″W

Links
- Public license information: Public file; LMS
- Webcast: Listen Live
- Website: kdmanews.com

KMGM (105.5 FM) is an American radio station licensed to serve the community of Montevideo, Minnesota, United States. The station, established in 1982, is owned and operated by the Iowa City Broadcasting Company. KMGM broadcasts a classic rock format to the greater southwestern Minnesota area. This station is unrelated to Los Angeles radio station KMGM (now KYSR) launched by Metro-Goldwyn-Mayer in 1948.

== Programming ==
The station launched in October 1982 with a full service radio format that mixed middle of the road, oldies, and Top 40 music with 20 hours per week of farm and agricultural programming. However, by 1985 the station would drop the farm programs and move to a mix of Top 40 and adult contemporary music. By 1987, with the station up for sale, the format would transition to a pure adult contemporary mix. The format would soften by the end of the century but the adult contemporary format has remained on the station for nearly a quarter-century. The station is an affiliate of the weekly syndicated Pink Floyd program "Floydian Slip."

== History ==
In November 1979, Jerald Hennen's Western Minnesota Stereo, Inc., applied to the Federal Communications Commission (FCC) for a construction permit for a new broadcast radio station. The FCC granted this permit on May 7, 1982, with a scheduled expiration date of May 7, 1983. The new station was assigned call sign "KMGM" on July 23, 1982. After construction and testing were completed, the station was granted its broadcast license on October 31, 1983.

In March 1987, license holder Western Minnesota Stereo, Inc., reached an agreement to sell Eagle Broadcasting Corporation. The FCC approved the deal on April 7, 1987, and the transaction was consummated on June 3, 1987.

Just over a decade later, in August 1997, Eagle Broadcasting Corporation, Inc., made a deal to sell KMGM to the Iowa City Broadcasting Company. The FCC approved the license transfer on October 21, 1997, and the deal was formally consummated on December 1, 1997. As of July 2010, Iowa City Broadcasting Company holds the broadcast licenses for 13 radio stations, including both KMGM and sister station KDMA in Montevideo.

On October 19, 2020 KMGM rebranded as "Bigfoot 105.5 FM".

== Station alumni ==
Broadcast veteran and KMGM founder Jerald "Jerry" C. Hennen died at 69 on July 7, 2009, in Fargo, North Dakota. His son, Scott Hennen, started working at KMGM while still in high school before moving on in the 1990s to become a disc jockey at KQHT (104.3 FM) in Grand Forks, North Dakota.
