= Kasson Public Library =

- Location: 607 1st St. NW; Kasson, Minnesota 55944

Collection
- Items collected: 37835

Access and use
- Population served: 12,000

Other information
- Director: Patricia Shaffer-Gottschalk
- Employees: 5
- Website: Official website

The Kasson Public Library serves the residents of Kasson, Mantorville and surrounding areas in the U.S. state of Minnesota with a service area of approximately 12,000 people. The library is a member of the SELCO regional library system.

In 2016, the library moved to a new 10,680 sq ft (992 m^{2}) building at 607 First St. NW, Kasson.
