= Kasson Public School =

- U.S. National Register of Historic Places
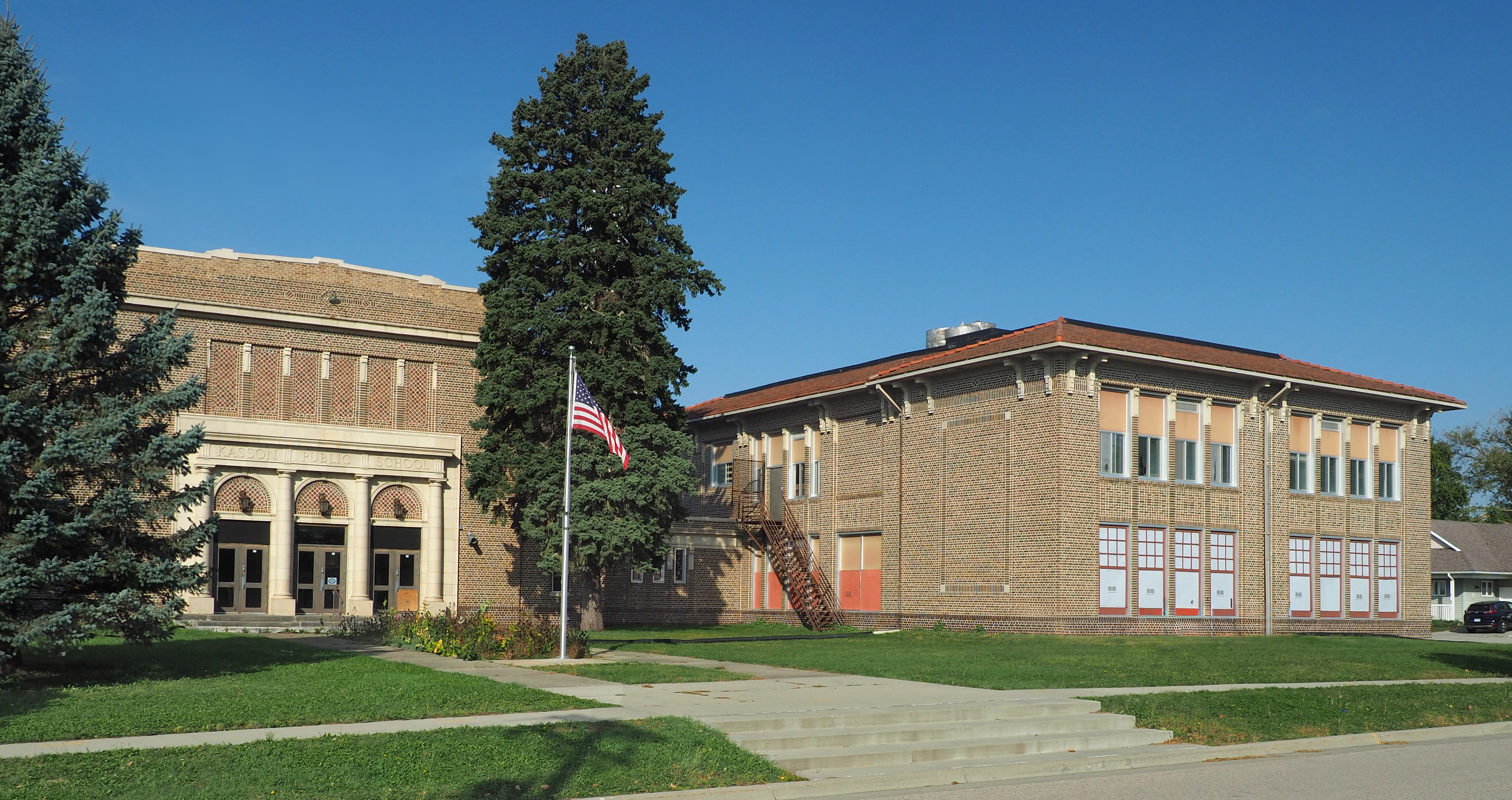
- Kasson Public School viewed from the southeast

- Location within Minnesota Location within the United States
- Location: 101 3rd Avenue NW, Kasson, Minnesota
- Coordinates: 44°1′51″N 92°45′9″W
- NRHP reference No.: 07001242
- Added to NRHP: December 6, 2007

The Kasson Public School building is located at 101 Third Avenue NW in city of Kasson, Dodge County, Minnesota, in the United States. Designed by architect Nels S. Jacobson Jr. of the architectural firm Jacobson & Jacobson, the school was constructed during the years 1917–1918. Kasson's elementary and high school students began using the building on December 5, 1918.

== Recognition ==
In 1919, Samuel A. Challman, Minnesota's State Commissioner of School Buildings, visited the school and noted its architectural design as an example for future construction. The school's design featured three units connected by a corridor. Challman emphasized the importance of public-school buildings in shaping community and student experiences.

== Use ==
The school served as Kasson's only school until 1958, when the district merged with Mantorville and built a new facility. After 1958, the building housed Kasson Elementary School until 2005. Subsequently, it was used for alternative education, community education, and school district administrative activities. These uses ended in 2005.

A water tower built in 1895, listed on the National Register of Historic Places, stands behind the school.

== Ownership and Community Actions ==
In 2006, the City of Kasson obtained the school. A referendum to reuse the building as a city hall and police station failed in November 2006. The city council then voted to demolish the building.

In response, citizens formed the Kasson Alliance for Restoration (KARE) to advocate for preservation. In 2007, KARE halted demolition by filing a lawsuit against the city. The building was listed on the National Register of Historic Places on December 6, 2007. The lawsuit was settled out of court in August 2008.

== Reuse Studies and Proposals ==
An Historic Properties Reuse Study in 2009 suggested multiple reuses for the school, including apartments, a library, and a community center. The city formed a Citizen's Task Force and polled residents in 2010, reporting support for reuse. KARE declined a city offer for partial ownership due to fundraising and planning concerns.

In September 2010, the Kasson Public Library Building Committee (KPLBC) was established to explore reusing the school site as a library. In August 2011, the committee presented a plan to build a new library after demolishing the old school; the council did not approve demolition but continued planning.

== Sale and Development Attempts ==
In November 2011, the school was offered for sale, attracting interest from several developers. Sherman Associates from Minneapolis proposed a senior housing project, but lacked sufficient funding and withdrew in late 2012. The city then voted for demolition, but citizens intervened. The school was eventually sold for $240,000 to a limited partnership, with KARE as the general partner.

From 2013 to 2015, Cohen-Esrey attempted to develop affordable apartments in the building. Despite approval of necessary permits, they failed to secure housing tax credits and withdrew.

== Recent activity ==
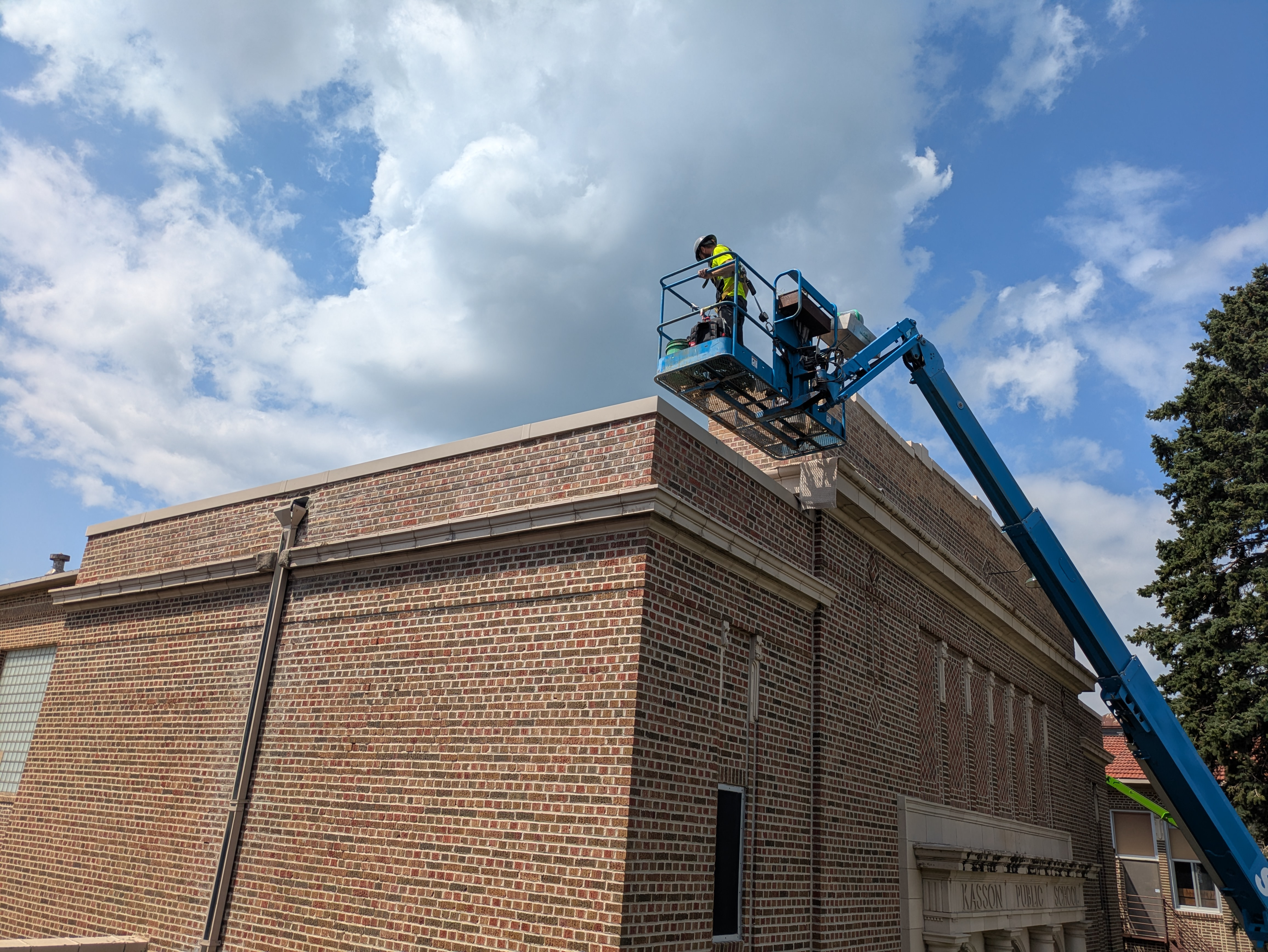
Exterior restoration work, 2025

In 2021, Kasson Historic Properties LLC attempted to convert the building to senior housing, but a lawsuit and the expiration of state historic tax credits ended the project.

In August 2023, IInvest LLC signed a $150,000 purchase agreement to redevelop the school. Funding for architectural planning and a historic tax credit application was secured, but further funding was required. Partnerships with experienced developers were being sought as of February 2025.

A Minnesota Historical Society Legacy Grant was awarded in 2024 for restoration of the building's terra cotta and bricks. Repairs were scheduled for spring 2025.
