= Vernon K. Jensen =

American politician and veterinarian (1912–1982)

Vernon K. Jensen (March 3, 1912 – December 11, 1982) was an American politician and veterinarian.

Jensen was born in Montevideo, Chippewa County, Minnesota and graduated from Montevideo Central High School. He graduated from the Ontario Veterinary College, Guelph, Ontario, Canada, in 1933. He lived in Montevideo, Minnesota with his wife and family. Jensen served on the Montevideo School Board and was president of the school board. He also served on the Minnesota State Veterinary Board and was the president of the state veterinary board. Jensen served in the Minnesota Senate from 1965 to 1972. He died from lung cancer at his home in Saint Paul, Minnesota
