= Philip S. Duff =

American politician

Philip Sheridan Duff Jr. (October 25, 1922 – January 9, 1997) was an American newspaper editor and politician.

Duff was born in Minneapolis, Minnesota and was raised near Wayzata, Minnesota. He and went to Blake School. Duff served in the United States Navy and was an aviator and instructor. Duff graduated from Yale University in 1946. He lived in Kasson, Dodge County, Minnesota with his wife and family and was the editor of the Dodge County Independent newspaper. Duff served in the Minnesota Senate from 1961 to 1954. He then moved to Red Wing, Minnesota and was the editor of the Red Wing Republican Eagle newspaper. Duff died at his home in Red Wing, Minnesota.
