= Windom College =

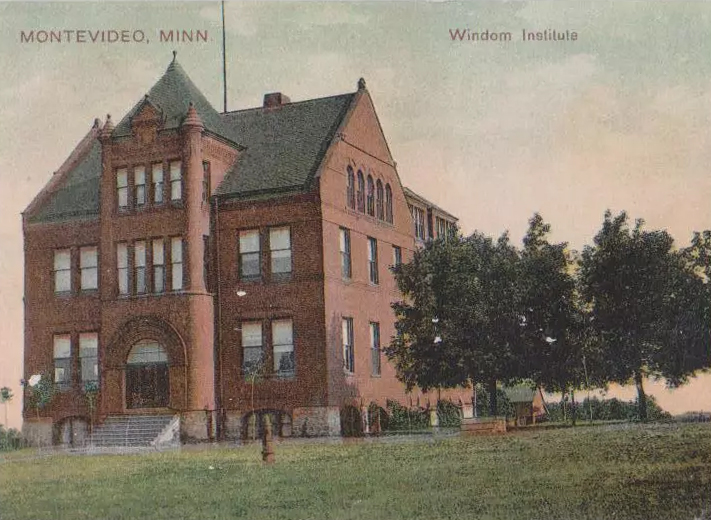
- Edwin S. Jones Hall ca.1900
- Former names: Western Minnesota Seminary; Windom Institute
- Active: 1885–1923
- Religious affiliation: Minnesota State Association of Congregational Churches
- Academic affiliations: Carleton College
- Location: Montevideo, Minnesota, U.S.
- Campus: 40 acres (16 ha)

Windom College (previous names, Western Minnesota Seminary and Windom Institute) is a former American parochial school in Montevideo, Minnesota. It is the second school established in southwestern Minnesota by the Congregational church. It was founded in 1885 with the hope that its students would take more advanced courses in Carleton College. Originally named "Western Minnesota Seminary", it became the "Windom Institute" in 1891 in honor of Hon. William Windom, United States Senator and Secretary of the Treasury, who was a member of the Congregational church in Winona, Minnesota, the earliest of the Congregational churches in southeastern Minnesota. The name change in 1912 to "Windom College" gave western Minnesota its first college. Windom College ended operations in 1923. Its building was purchased by and became the official home of the Masons of Montevideo.

== Location ==
Windom College was located in Montevideo in the western part of Minnesota. The institute was situated on a high bluff overlooking the valleys of the Minnesota and Chippewa Rivers, about 0.5 miles (0.80 km) from the confluence of the streams. It was in the center of a thickly-settled and rich farming section about 250 miles (400 km) in diameter if the nearest colleges were the limits. This section was to contain scores of small cities and hundreds of prosperous villages, a large proportion of which could look to Windom Institute for the help of hundreds of young people who could not for one reason or another link themselves with the public High Schools. But the great mission of the school was to the boys and girls of the farm in the whose awakening to the value of an education came too late for entrance on the graded school curriculum. The students came largely from a Scandinavian and American population.

The large campus of 40 acres (16 ha) afforded opportunities for outdoor sports, such as tennis, baseball, football, boating, fishing, and during the winter months, skating, coasting, and skiing.

== Background ==
In 1884, President Strong of Carleton College suggested at a meeting of the State Association of Congregational Churches, the necessity of Academies or Fitting Schools in different sections of Minnesota. There was hardly a boy or girl in all the Montevideo region who had any aspiration for a "higher education" or comprehension of what that term stood for.

To create a new standard of culture for western Minnesota, and to link such an effort to the inspiring forces of religion, was the thought in the minds of those who founded the Western Minnesota Seminary in 1885. A corporation of 26 members, with provision as to its relation to the churches and to Carleton College, was organized to carry out the plans for this enterprise, and steps were taken for the raising of funds. The canvass of Montevideo and vicinity resulted in pledges of US$22,000, face value. C. A. Strong was the first to pledge US$1,000.

== Western Minnesota Seminary, 1885 ==
In the fall of 1885, the school was opened with three boys and one girl. An old hotel on the hill was secured and fitted up as well as the poverty of the school's treasury allowed. The office and parlor were recitation rooms, the dining room, an assembly hall, while a little dingy back room served as an art and music department. James Fairchild, of Oberlin College and Harvard University, was the principal, a man who inherited from his father, George Fairchild, an integrity and ability that were of great importance in this formative period of the school. Miss Julia V. Finney, from Carleton College, brought to the school exceptional teaching ability and a sympathy with its purposes which gave her patience under trying circumstances. Miss Lizzie Cady, of Oberlin, had charge of the musical instruction. Miss Minnie Bailey, from Carleton undertook art instruction in the school and village. Their salaries were small and often months behind.

In one of the school's most dire financial periods, Judge Edwin Smith Jones, of Minneapolis, came to Montevideo to investigate for himself. He assured the school's administration "... that the school is not going to give up, it is going to succeed, and you tell them that I say so." From that day, Judge Jones gave of his time and money to supplement the administration's other efforts.

In September 1888, the State Association of Congregational churches met at Owatonna, Minnesota. The school was in poor financial circumstance at that time, and when a report was called for from the Academy, a simple statement of the serious situation was given. Wyman Elliot was in the chair and at the close of the report, he started a movement for help by giving a farm outright. Carleton College waived its right to time while Pres. Strong and Prof. Goodhue made effective pleas for Montevideo. Messrs. Morley and Evans took the platform, and in half an hour US$2,500 was subscribed to help the school, gifts coming from every part of the State.

About 1890, new forces began to enter into the making of the school. One of the most important of these was the coming of Charles W. Headley, with his wife, to the principalship of the school. Educated in Ripon College and Yale Divinity School, Principal Headley brought a strong influence to the school shaping the character of the graduates for the next decade. Headley stayed through hard times, and only resigned when peace and success returned. We always honor him for this great service.

== Windom Institute, 1891 ==
In July 1891, the name change from the Western Minnesota Seminary to Windom Institute was brought about by a petition to the Windom family, stating the desirability of making the monument to the memory of William Windom such a living institution rather than a bronze tablet. The document contained the names of eight governors. The dedication of Jones Hall in that same year brought to Montevideo the highest officials of the state and notable men in business and educational circles.

During these years the school was fortunate in interesting Mr. W. S. Benton, of Minneapolis, in its future. His sympathy with the institute's purposes and his prophetic measure of the future of western Minnesota led him to provide in his will an endowment of US$25,000 as a basis for the permanence of the undertaking. After the death of Mr. Benton, his widow proved to be generous to Windom Institute as well.

Marion LeRoy Burton and his wife came to the school in 1900 and by their broad and deep interest, became the school's leaders. Miss Hannah M. Griffith, of Carleton and Wellesley College training, filled the position of preceptress-teacher. Harry S. Martin served as principal of the Institute in 1904-6, with Mrs. Martin. Rev. Frank King Singiser was the principal in 1907-09, with his wife as preceptress. Ralph Edwin Nichol was principal in 1910 and 1911. For many years, Nellie Moyer Budd served as head of the music department.

== Windom College, 1912 ==
Calvin E. Buswell served as principal in 1912. At the meeting of the trustees of the institute in June 1912, it was determined to change the name of the school to Windom College, and to give two years of college work, the purpose being to develop the academy into a college, thus giving to western Minnesota its first and only college. The trustees rightly felt that the opportunities for the development of a great school in this vast agricultural territory ought not to be neglected, there being no other school of the class nearer than Minneapolis or Northfield, Minnesota. To support such a school, it became necessary to enlarge the endowment fund. James J. Hill offered US$50,000 on the condition that the school raise an additional US$200,000, making a total endowment of US$250,000. The people of Montevideo and the surrounding region responded liberally to the call for financial aid. The last few thousands were raised at a mass meeting held in the Minneapolis Opera House at which more than US$51,000 were pledged. May 15, 1915 was set as the time for completing the endowment.

From 1913 to 1918 was the presidency of Rev. John H. Morley, who had been the president of Fargo College in 1900-1906. Lycurgus Rose Moyer, of Montevideo, was treasurer of Windom College from 1896 until his death in 1917.

== Fire of 1915 ==
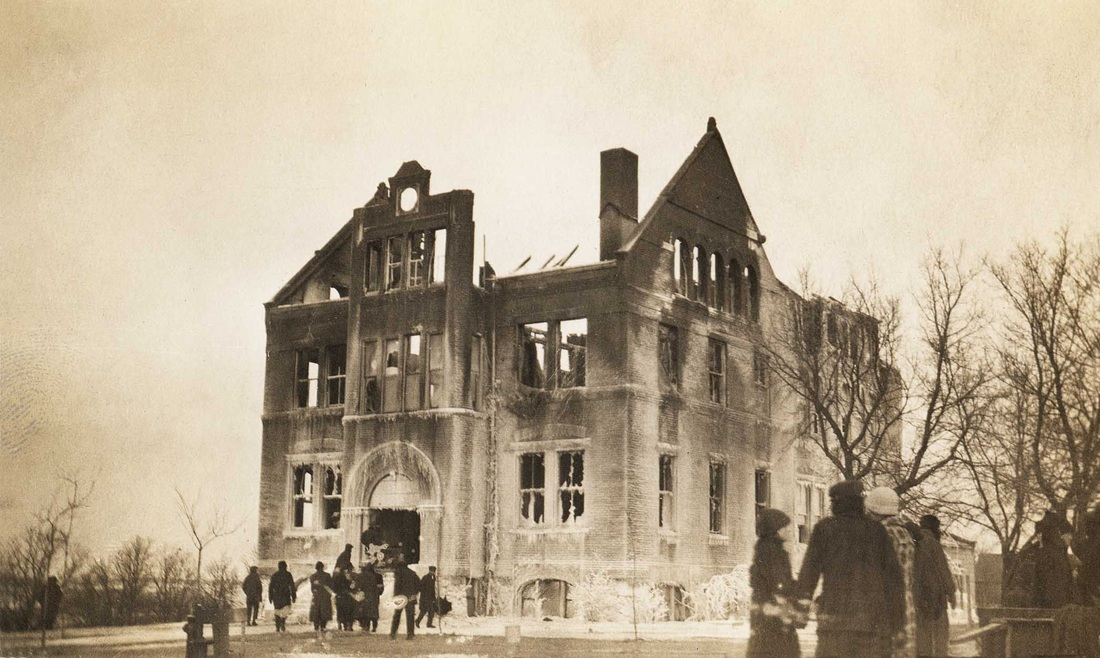
Remains of Jones Hall after fire

On Friday evening, January 25, 1915, fire started in the roof of Jones Hall. The hydrant near the building was frozen, and the water power was insufficient to raise any considerable stream of water to that elevation. Owing to insufficient water pressure it was impossible to use the standpipe and hose in the building which were always kept ready for emergencies. The flames spread so rapidly that there was a loss of nearly everything on the upper floors.

President Morley was on a train coming from Minneapolis at the time of the fire, and when a telegram reached him carrying the news of the fire, and that Windom College was burning, he said:— "Jones Hall may be burning, but Windom College cannot burn". On the following Tuesday morning, chapel was formally held at the Congregational church, and from that time forward, school went on almost uninterruptedly, the several classes being heard in the various churches and in the public library.

There was US$9,500 insurance. The trustees met at once and ordered plans drawn for the remodeling of Jones Hall into a science hall, with rooms for chapel, library and music, and the gymnasium lengthened to 70 feet (21 m).

The new Jones Hall was erected in the summer of 1915, the whole building cemented in gray. Ample accommodations for recitation rooms was furnished, and the laboratory was better equipped for work than previously. There were also practice rooms for music, which had been lacking. In all, in this modern three-story and basement building with its facilities for laboratory, musical and recitation purposes there was little to remind anyone of the old building except the tablet dedicated to Hon. Mr. Jones, which was placed in a conspicuous place in the entrance, for the new building, like the old, was named Jones Hall. The contract price for the new building was about US$25,000. Besides this, the foundation and walls of the old building, which were used, were worth about US$5,000. Thus the new building was worth over US$30,000.

The trustees wanted to erect a US$30,000 ladies' dormitory as soon as funds were in hand for this purpose. Besides their endowment campaign, Windom became engaged in raising a building fund of US$50,000. Mr. Hill promised US$10,000 of this. The endowment campaign was temporarily stayed because of the fire. Mr. Hill extended the time for its completion one year.

== Closure ==
For the outlook of this College at the beginning of the school year 1920-21, we may quote its announcement by the Montevideo News, September 30, 1920:— "The fall term at Windom opened Tuesday with a promising enrollment of new students. A teaching staff of seven members has been secured for the various departments. All of the members of this year's faculty are graduates of standard colleges and they come strongly endorsed. While the full four-year course is offered at Wdom the trend is toward business education, as is shown in the training offered. R. G. Walker, a graduate of the University of Nebraska, is a new member of the faculty, in charge of courses in bookkeeping, banking, and allied subjects. John R. Rowe, Beloit College, will act as principal and also teach classes in mathematics and science. Miss Alice Roosevelt, Grinnell College, is again at the head of the music department, and will also teach languages. Mrs. Bayard Taylor, Beloit College, is preceptress and teacher of history and civics. New equipment for the business courses has been installed during the summer. Among the modern appliances available for the use of students are dictaphones, a bank posting machine, and an electric mimeograph."

The directors of the college put it up for sale in July 1922, offering it to the Montevideo, Minnesota school district for US$35,000, but later in the month, the citizens of Montevideo defeated the proprosition to purchase the property and make it a part of the public school system. In August, the Montevideo Masonic Association purchased the property for US$5,000 with the intent to remodel it into a Masonic temple. Windom College ended operations in 1923, and the Masons moved into the school's building in February, when it became the official home of the Masons of Montevideo.
