= Paul Gruchow =

American writer

- Born: May 23, 1947; Montevideo, Minnesota, United States
- Died: February 22, 2004 (aged 56); Duluth, Minnesota
- Education: University of Minnesota
- Occupations: author editor conservationist
- Spouse: Nancy
- Writing career
- Subject: rural landscapes
- Notable works: Boundary Waters: The Grace of the Wild; Grass Roots: The Universe of Home; Journal of a Prairie Year; The Necessity of Empty Places; Travels in Canoe Country
- Notable awards: Minnesota Book Award; Lifetime Achievement Award
- Website: www.paulgruchow.org

Paul Gruchow (May 23, 1947 – February 22, 2004) was an American author, editor, and conservationist from Montevideo, Minnesota. A student of poet John Berryman, he is well known for his strong support of rural communities, as expressed in his first book, "Journal of a Prairie Year" published by University of Minnesota Press. His essays in Grass Roots: The Universe of Home, document his ideas with stories of growing up in rural Chippewa County Minnesota.

== Career ==
Gruchow was editor and co-owner of the highly respected Worthington Daily Globe in Worthington during the late 1970s and 1980s. When the newspaper was sold, he moved to Northfield, Minnesota, where he was an instructor at St. Olaf, Northfield, Minnesota and Concordia College, Moorhead, Minnesota. His essays appeared in Minnesota Monthly Magazine (published by Minnesota Public Radio), the Utne Reader, and book reviews in the Hungry Mind Review. In addition to "Journal of a Prairie Year," Gruchow's books include Discovering the Universe of Home and Boundary Waters: The Grace of the Wild; "the Necessity of Empty Places", St. Martin's Press, "Worlds Within Worlds", Minnesota Department of Natural Resources, and "Images of Home" with photographer Jim Brandenburg, by the Blandin Foundation of Grand Rapids, Minnesota. A travel essay from "Empty Places" appeared in the Sunday NY Times. He wrote occasionally for The Utne Reader, and the Hungry Mind Review.

== Death and legacy ==
Gruchow died by suicide on February 22, 2004, in Duluth, soon after completing the first draft of a book about depression. In memory of his literary contributions, an annual Paul Gruchow Essay Contest is conducted by Writers Rising Up to Defend Place, Natural Habitat and Wetlands through the Minnesota Landscape Arboretum.

In 2007 a collection entitled The Grace of Grass and Water: Writing in Honor of Paul Gruchow was published by the Ice Cube Press.

Letters to a Young Madman: A Memoir, Gruchow's seventh and final book was released in September 2012 by Levins Publishing in Minneapolis, Minnesota.

== Books ==
- Boundary Waters: The Grace of the Wild
- Grass Roots: The Universe of Home
- Journal of a Prairie Year
- The Necessity of Empty Places
- Travels in Canoe Country
- Letters to a Young Madman: A Memoir
