= KDMA (AM) =

Coordinates: 44°56′05″N 95°44′50″W

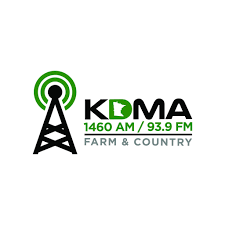
- Montevideo, Minnesota; United States
- Frequency: 1460 kHz

Programming
- Format: Full-service Country
- Affiliations: Fox News Radio; Minnesota Timberwolves

Ownership
- Owner: Iowa City Broadcasting Company
- Sister stations: KDMA-FM, KMGM

History
- First air date: 1951

Technical information
- Licensing authority: FCC
- Facility ID: 18052
- Class: B
- Power: 1,000 watts

Links
- Public license information: Public file; LMS
- Webcast: Listen Live
- Website: kdmanews.com

KDMA (1460 kHz) is an American AM radio station licensed to serve the community of Montevideo, Minnesota. The station is a traditional "full service" AM radio station, meaning the programming is locally produced and has a local focus.

Iowa City Broadcasting Company acquired the station in 1997 from Eagle Broadcasting Corporation. According to FCC ownership reports Iowa City Broadcasting is 100% owned by Thomas E. Ingstad of Minnetonka, Minnesota.

== History ==
=== Launch and early Midwest Broadcasting ownership ===
KDMA was established in 1951 by Midwest Broadcasting Company. A December 15, 1951, verification letter from the station identified KDMA as a new Montevideo station owned by Midwest Broadcasting Company, with Harry W. Linder as president. The same letter described KDMA as affiliated with Linder-associated stations KWLM in Willmar, KTOE in Mankato and KMHL in Marshall. The station reported that it had conducted an equipment test program on December 6, 1951, and that it expected to be licensed for regular programming within a week.

Broadcasting-Telecasting reported that KDMA became the 300th radio affiliate of the ABC radio network on December 15, 1951. At sign-on, the station operated full-time with 100 watts on 1450 kHz. The trade publication identified Midwest Broadcasting Corporation as the owner and Willard Linder as the manager. In January 1952, Broadcasting-Telecasting listed KDMA's license for a modified construction permit authorizing the new AM station.

=== Move to 1460 kHz and 1,000-watt operation ===
KDMA later moved from 1450 kHz to 1460 kHz and increased power to 1,000 watts. By early 1960, FCC-related listings in Broadcasting showed KDMA operating on 1460 kHz with 1,000 watts, unlimited hours, and a DA-1 directional antenna. Midwest Broadcasting sought authority to change to a nighttime directional antenna system while continuing on 1460 kHz with 1,000 watts and unlimited hours. The FCC granted the change from DA-1 to DA-N in 1961, allowing continued operation on 1460 kHz with 1,000 watts full-time, subject to an engineering condition.

KDMA remained connected to the Linder broadcasting interests into the 1970s. In 1970, Broadcasting reported that the FCC had granted a transfer of control of Midwest Broadcasting Corporation from Harry Willard Linder to Minnesota Valley Broadcasting Company. Minnesota Valley Broadcasting was owned by Harry Willard Linder and family and also owned KTOE in Mankato and KMHL-AM-FM in Marshall.

=== Rudd and Eagle Broadcasting ownership ===
In 1986, Broadcasting reported that KDMA was being sold by Midwest Broadcasting Corporation to James C. Rudd for $450,000. The station was listed at the time as operating on 1460 kHz with 1,000 watts full-time. The seller was identified as owned by Don Linder and his uncle, Willard, and the trade publication noted that Midwest Broadcasting also owned KMHL and KKCK in Marshall. Later that same year, Broadcasting reported a proposed assignment of KDMA from Rudd to Eagle Broadcasting Corporation for $450,000. Eagle Broadcasting was identified as owned by David A. Ramage and James C. Rudd.

Eagle Broadcasting later added FM sister station KMGM. In 1987, Broadcasting reported the sale of KMGM-FM in Montevideo-Granite Falls to Eagle Broadcasting Corporation for $400,000. The buyer was identified as David A. Ramage and James C. Rudd, with Rudd described as general manager of KDMA and holding a one-third interest in KDMA, while Ramage held a two-thirds interest.

A Minnesota Broadcasters Association directory later listed KDMA-AM 1460 as an Eagle Broadcasting Corporation station. The listing named David Ramage as president, Troy Ramage as vice president and Cathy Eagan Spicer as secretary-treasurer. It listed Deanna Hodge as general manager, Linda Christianson as sales manager, Dwight Mulder as program director, Mike Dupere as news director, Matthew Grage as sports director and Lou Kuno as music director. The directory also listed ABC and Linder Farm Network affiliations, Associated Press wire service, 1,000 watts of power, a 198-foot antenna height and operating hours of 5:30 a.m. to midnight. The same directory listed KMGM-FM 105.5 as an Eagle Broadcasting station with the same officers and staff, establishing the KDMA/KMGM pairing under Eagle ownership.

=== Sale to Iowa City Broadcasting and Ingstad ownership ===
In 1997, KDMA was included in a multi-station sale from companies headed by David Ramage to Iowa City Broadcasting Company. Radio Business Report reported that the $2.75 million transaction included KKXL-AM-FM in Grand Forks, North Dakota; KDMA-AM and KMGM-FM in Montevideo; and KKRC-FM in Granite Falls, Minnesota. The buyer was Iowa City Broadcasting Company, headed by Thomas Ingstad, and the seller group included Eagle Broadcasting. Broadcasting & Cable also reported the transaction, listing KDMA (AM)-KMGM (FM) in Montevideo and KKRC-FM in Granite Falls as part of the $2.75 million deal, with Thomas E. Ingstad of Minneapolis as buyer and David Ramage of Grand Forks as seller.

Iowa City Broadcasting remained KDMA's licensee in the 2000s. In 2005, the FCC granted renewal of license for KDMA, listing the station as KDMA, facility ID 18052, Montevideo, Minnesota, on 1460 kHz, with Iowa City Broadcasting Company as licensee. In 2012, the FCC granted a voluntary transfer of control of Iowa City Broadcasting Company for KDMA from Thomas E. Ingstad to Tor H. Ingstad. The same FCC public notice also listed transfers for related stations KKRC at 93.9 MHz in Granite Falls and KMGM at 105.5 MHz in Montevideo.

=== FM simulcast and later programming ===
KDMA's own app listing states that 1460 KDMA went on the air in 1951 and that, in 2017, the station's programming became available on 93.9 FM as well. The app listing describes KDMA's programming as including local news, national news from ABC, state news from the Minnesota News Network, agricultural news from the Linder Farm Network, AgriTalk, Minnesota Gophers and Timberwolves sports, and local Thunderhawks coverage. The Montevideo Area Chamber of Commerce describes KDMA/KMGM Radio as providing local, state and national news coverage, business marketing and local, state and national sports coverage.

During the FCC's AM Revitalization translator window, Iowa City Broadcasting sought program test authority for a new 98.3 MHz FM translator in Montevideo to relay KDMA. NorthPine reported in 2022 that the translator had been granted during the AM Revitalization effort and that KDMA was also simulcast on KDMA-FM 93.9 in Granite Falls. In 2025, NorthPine reported that the FCC had canceled the license for the Montevideo 98.3 MHz translator that had relayed KDMA, while noting that KDMA continued to be simulcast on KDMA-FM 93.9, which covers Montevideo.
