= KDMA-FM =

Coordinates: 44°51′24″N 95°37′46″W

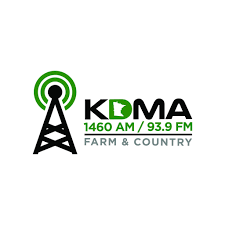
- Granite Falls, Minnesota; United States
- Broadcast area: Montevideo, Minnesota; Granite Falls, Minnesota; Clara City, Minnesota
- Frequency: 93.9 MHz

Programming
- Format: Full-service and country
- Affiliations: Fox News Radio; Minnesota Timberwolves

Ownership
- Owner: Iowa City Broadcasting Company, Inc.
- Sister stations: KDMA, KMGM

History
- First air date: 1994
- Former call signs: KKRC (1990–2018)

Technical information
- Licensing authority: FCC
- Facility ID: 34618
- Class: A
- ERP: 6,000 watts
- HAAT: 80 meters (260 ft)

Links
- Public license information: Public file; LMS
- Webcast: Listen live
- Website: kdmanews.com

KDMA-FM (93.9 FM) is a radio station licensed to Granite Falls, Minnesota. KDMA-FM airs a full-service/country music format simulcasting with sister station KDMA, and is owned by Iowa City Broadcasting Company, Inc.

== History ==
The station began as a new FM construction permit at Granite Falls, Minnesota. On October 10, 1990, the Federal Communications Commission granted John Linder's application for a new station on 93.9 MHz, authorized for 3,000 watts with an antenna height of 328 feet. By 1992, the construction permit was using the call sign KKRC. On August 10, 1992, the FCC granted a modification of the construction permit, increasing the authorized power to 6,000 watts horizontal and vertical, with an antenna height of 80 meters, from a transmitter site 3.9 kilometers from Wegdahl, Minnesota.

By July 1994, KKRC was on the air as "Double-K Country", a country station serving Granite Falls.

In 1997, KKRC was included in a multi-station sale that also involved KDMA (1460 AM) and KMGM (105.5 FM) in Montevideo, Minnesota, and KKXL AM-FM in Grand Forks, North Dakota. Broadcasting & Cable reported the sale price as $2.75 million, with Thomas E. Ingstad of Minneapolis as the buyer and David Ramage of Grand Forks as the seller. The M Street Journal also listed a proposed FCC Form 314 assignment of KKRC from KILO Broadcasting, Inc. to Iowa City Broadcasting Company.

After the sale, KKRC changed formats. In March 1998, The M Street Journal reported that the station changed from Jones Radio Networks country programming to JRN oldies. The station later used the "KOOL Gold" identity, with an oldies/classic-hits format focused on music from the 1960s and 1970s. An archived station app listing also described KKRC as carrying Yellow Medicine High School sports, Minnesota Wild hockey and local Granite Falls news.

On May 15, 2012, the FCC granted a voluntary transfer of control of Iowa City Broadcasting Company stations, including KKRC, from Thomas E. Ingstad to Tor H. Ingstad.

KDMA's own station app later stated that KDMA's programming became available on 93.9 FM in 2017. In April 2018, NorthPine reported that KDMA-FM, formerly KKRC, was simulcasting the news, farm and classic country format of KDMA (1460 AM) in Montevideo.

As part of the KDMA/KMGM Radio operation in Montevideo, KDMA-FM carries programming emphasizing local, state and national news, sports, agricultural information and country music. The station's app description lists ABC News, the Minnesota News Network, the Linder Farm Network, AgriTalk, Minnesota Gophers sports, Minnesota Timberwolves basketball and local Thunderhawks sports among KDMA's programming. A Montevideo Area Chamber of Commerce listing for KDMA/KMGM Radio also describes the operation as providing local, state and national news and sports coverage.
