= Montevideo, Minnesota =

City in Minnesota, United States

Montevideo
- City
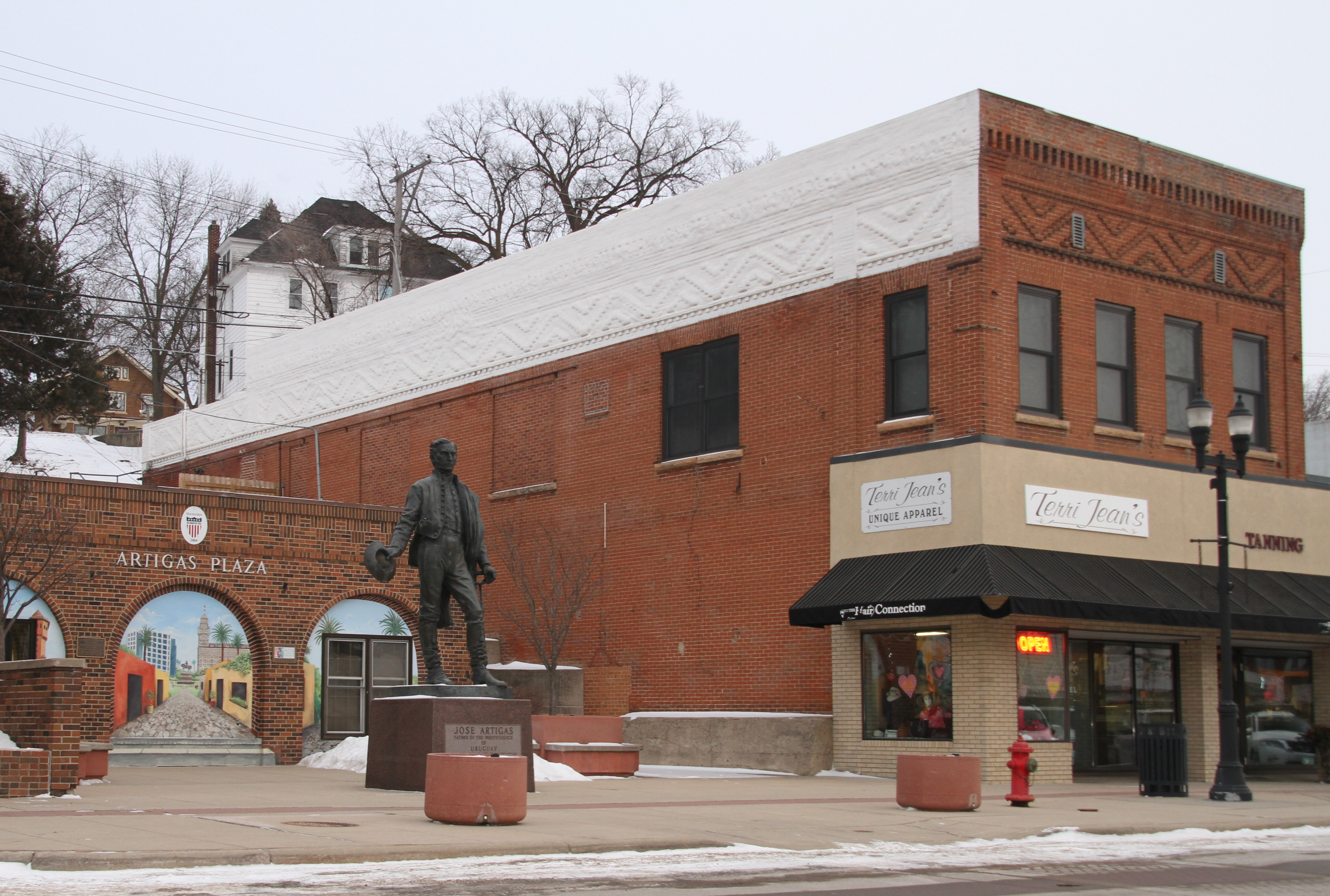
- Artigas Plaza in Montevideo

- Location of Montevideo within Chippewa County, Minnesota
- Coordinates: 44°57′02″N 95°42′55″W
- Country: United States
- State: Minnesota
- County: Chippewa
- Platted: May 25, 1870
- Incorporated (village): March 4, 1879
- Incorporated (city): June 30, 1908

Government
  - Type: Council – Manager
  - Mayor: Erich Winter

Area
  - Total: 4.80 sq mi (12.44 km^{2})
  - Land: 4.71 sq mi (12.20 km^{2})
  - Water: 0.089 sq mi (0.23 km^{2})
- Elevation: 1,020 ft (310 m)

Population (2020)
  - Total: 5,398
  - Estimate (2022): 5,300
  - Density: 1,145.6/sq mi (442.31/km^{2})
- Time zone: UTC-6 (Central)
  - Summer (DST): UTC-5 (CDT)
- ZIP code: 56265
- Area code: 320
- FIPS code: 27-43720
- GNIS feature ID: 2395377
- Website: montevideomn.org

Montevideo (/ˌmɒntəˈvɪdioʊ/ MON-tə-VID-ee-oh) is a city in and the county seat of Chippewa County, Minnesota, United States. The population was 5,398 at the 2020 census.

The area around Montevideo was populated by Native Americans and fur traders during the first half of the 19th century. After the Dakota War of 1862, the US government opened the area to homesteaders. Railroads were built, and settlers followed, including Civil War veterans, Norwegians, Germans, Swedes, Dutch, and Irish. Montevideo was incorporated in 1879.

== Geography ==
Montevideo is in a double river valley where the Minnesota and Chippewa rivers converge, about 140 miles (230 km) west of Minneapolis, at the junction of U.S. Highways 59 and 212 with Minnesota State Highways 7 and 29.

The surrounding topography is dominated by farmland and prairies, as well as river valleys with many scenic overlooks and small bluffs.

According to the United States Census Bureau, the city has an area of 4.85 square miles (12.56 km^{2}), of which 4.76 square miles (12.33 km^{2}) is land and 0.09 square miles (0.23 km^{2}) is water.

== Climate ==
Montevideo, like the rest of Minnesota, has a four-season humid continental climate with great differences between summer and winter. The average July high is 82 °F (28 °C) with the average January high being 22 °F (−6 °C). The station recorded data from 1891 to 2019.

Climate data for Montevideo, Minnesota (1991–2020 normals, extremes since 1891)
| Month | Jan | Feb | Mar | Apr | May | Jun | Jul | Aug | Sep | Oct | Nov | Dec | Year |
|---|---|---|---|---|---|---|---|---|---|---|---|---|---|
| Record high °F (°C) | 69 (21) | 64 (18) | 88 (31) | 100 (38) | 105 (41) | 107 (42) | 110 (43) | 106 (41) | 105 (41) | 94 (34) | 82 (28) | 72 (22) | 110 (43) |
| Mean maximum °F (°C) | 44 (7) | 47 (8) | 64 (18) | 81 (27) | 90 (32) | 93 (34) | 93 (34) | 91 (33) | 89 (32) | 84 (29) | 64 (18) | 47 (8) | 96 (36) |
| Mean daily maximum °F (°C) | 21.9 (−5.6) | 26.8 (−2.9) | 39.3 (4.1) | 55.3 (12.9) | 68.8 (20.4) | 78.5 (25.8) | 82.2 (27.9) | 80.1 (26.7) | 73.5 (23.1) | 59.0 (15.0) | 41.8 (5.4) | 27.6 (−2.4) | 54.6 (12.6) |
| Daily mean °F (°C) | 11.9 (−11.2) | 16.1 (−8.8) | 28.8 (−1.8) | 43.5 (6.4) | 57.1 (13.9) | 67.3 (19.6) | 71.0 (21.7) | 68.6 (20.3) | 60.8 (16.0) | 46.9 (8.3) | 31.4 (−0.3) | 18.3 (−7.6) | 43.5 (6.4) |
| Mean daily minimum °F (°C) | 2.0 (−16.7) | 5.4 (−14.8) | 18.4 (−7.6) | 31.7 (−0.2) | 45.4 (7.4) | 56.1 (13.4) | 59.8 (15.4) | 57.1 (13.9) | 48.1 (8.9) | 34.7 (1.5) | 21.1 (−6.1) | 9.1 (−12.7) | 32.4 (0.2) |
| Mean minimum °F (°C) | −20 (−29) | −15 (−26) | −5 (−21) | 18 (−8) | 31 (−1) | 44 (7) | 49 (9) | 46 (8) | 33 (1) | 20 (−7) | 3 (−16) | −13 (−25) | −23 (−31) |
| Record low °F (°C) | −38 (−39) | −39 (−39) | −25 (−32) | 2 (−17) | 16 (−9) | 31 (−1) | 31 (−1) | 34 (1) | 14 (−10) | 4 (−16) | −23 (−31) | −33 (−36) | −39 (−39) |
| Average precipitation inches (mm) | 0.67 (17) | 0.76 (19) | 1.90 (48) | 2.48 (63) | 3.66 (93) | 4.35 (110) | 3.82 (97) | 3.96 (101) | 3.01 (76) | 2.46 (62) | 1.56 (40) | 0.82 (21) | 29.45 (748) |
| Average snowfall inches (cm) | 8.0 (20) | 9.9 (25) | 7.9 (20) | 4.6 (12) | 0.1 (0.25) | 0.0 (0.0) | 0.0 (0.0) | 0.0 (0.0) | 0.0 (0.0) | 0.4 (1.0) | 4.3 (11) | 10.3 (26) | 45.5 (116) |
| Average extreme snow depth inches (cm) | 7 (18) | 7 (18) | 5 (13) | 2 (5.1) | 0 (0) | 0 (0) | 0 (0) | 0 (0) | 0 (0) | 0 (0) | 3 (7.6) | 7 (18) | 12 (30) |
Source: NOAA

== Demographics ==
Historical population
| Census | Pop. | Note | %± |
|---|---|---|---|
| 1880 | 862 | | — |
| 1890 | 1,437 | | 66.7% |
| 1900 | 2,146 | | 49.3% |
| 1910 | 3,056 | | 42.4% |
| 1920 | 4,419 | | 44.6% |
| 1930 | 4,319 | | −2.3% |
| 1940 | 5,220 | | 20.9% |
| 1950 | 5,459 | | 4.6% |
| 1960 | 5,693 | | 4.3% |
| 1970 | 5,661 | | −0.6% |
| 1980 | 5,845 | | 3.3% |
| 1990 | 5,499 | | −5.9% |
| 2000 | 5,346 | | −2.8% |
| 2010 | 5,383 | | 0.7% |
| 2020 | 5,398 | | 0.3% |
| 2022 (est.) | 5,300 | | −1.8% |
U.S. Decennial Census; 2020 Census

=== 2020 census ===
As of the 2020 census, Montevideo had a population of 5,398. The median age was 40.3 years. 24.9% of residents were under the age of 18 and 22.6% of residents were 65 years of age or older. For every 100 females there were 93.5 males, and for every 100 females age 18 and over there were 91.7 males age 18 and over.

99.4% of residents lived in urban areas, while 0.6% lived in rural areas.

There were 2,288 households in Montevideo, of which 28.6% had children under the age of 18 living in them. Of all households, 41.1% were married-couple households, 20.2% were households with a male householder and no spouse or partner present, and 29.6% were households with a female householder and no spouse or partner present. About 35.0% of all households were made up of individuals and 17.9% had someone living alone who was 65 years of age or older.

There were 2,477 housing units, of which 7.6% were vacant. The homeowner vacancy rate was 1.3% and the rental vacancy rate was 5.3%.

Racial composition as of the 2020 census
| Race | Number | Percent |
|---|---|---|
| White | 4,326 | 80.1% |
| Black or African American | 37 | 0.7% |
| American Indian and Alaska Native | 52 | 1.0% |
| Asian | 32 | 0.6% |
| Native Hawaiian and Other Pacific Islander | 50 | 0.9% |
| Some other race | 536 | 9.9% |
| Two or more races | 365 | 6.8% |
| Hispanic or Latino (of any race) | 835 | 15.5% |

=== 2010 census ===
As of the census of 2010, there were 5,383 people, 2,326 households, and 1,404 families living in the city. The population density was 1,130.9 inhabitants per square mile (436.6/km^{2}). There were 2,510 housing units at an average density of 527.3 per square mile (203.6/km^{2}). The racial makeup of the city was 92.0% White, 0.6% African American, 0.7% Native American, 0.5% Asian, 4.6% from other races, and 1.5% from two or more races. Hispanic or Latino of any race were 8.4% of the population.

There were 2,326 households, of which 28.0% had children under the age of 18 living with them, 44.5% were married couples living together, 11.1% had a female householder with no husband present, 4.8% had a male householder with no wife present, and 39.6% were non-families. 35.1% of all households were made up of individuals, and 18.2% had someone living alone who was 65 years of age or older. The average household size was 2.25 and the average family size was 2.86.

The median age in the city was 41 years. 23.4% of residents were under the age of 18; 8% were between the ages of 18 and 24; 23.1% were from 25 to 44; 25% were from 45 to 64; and 20.3% were 65 years of age or older. The gender makeup of the city was 47.0% male and 53.0% female.

=== 2000 census ===
As of the census of 2000, there were 5,346 people, 2,353 households, and 1,444 families living in the city. The population density was 1,190.5 inhabitants per square mile (459.7/km^{2}). There were 2,551 housing units at an average density of 568.1 per square mile (219.3/km^{2}). The racial makeup of the city was 97.10% White, 0.11% African American, 0.41% Native American, 0.34% Asian, 0.06% Pacific Islander, 0.80% from other races, and 1.18% from two or more races. Hispanic or Latino of any race were 2.00% of the population.

There were 2,353 households, out of which 28.6% had children under the age of 18 living with them, 48.6% were married couples living together, 9.2% had a female householder with no husband present, and 38.6% were non-families. 34.8% of all households were made up of individuals, and 18.3% had someone living alone who was 65 years of age or older. The average household size was 2.24 and the average family size was 2.89.

In the city, the population was spread out, with 24.5% under the age of 18, 8.0% from 18 to 24, 24.3% from 25 to 44, 22.6% from 45 to 64, and 20.6% who were 65 years of age or older. The median age was 40 years. For every 100 females, there were 89.2 males. For every 100 females age 18 and over, there were 86.3 males.

The median income for a household in the city was $32,447, and the median income for a family was $44,706. Males had a median income of $30,838 versus $19,013 for females. The per capita income for the city was $18,025. About 4.7% of families and 10.1% of the population were below the poverty line, including 12.2% of those under age 18 and 8.9% of those age 65 or over.

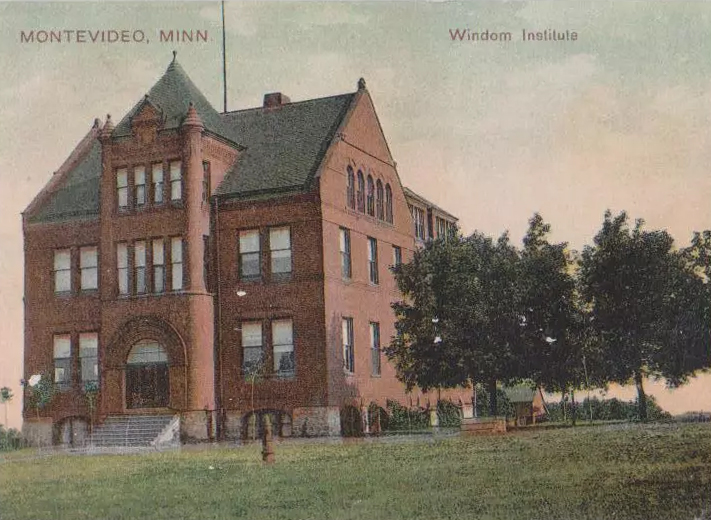
Located in Montevideo, Windom College (1885-1923) was named after William Windom.

== Sister City relationship ==
The relationship with Montevideo, Uruguay, began in 1905 when the mayor of each city sent a national flag to the other.

== Local media ==
KDMA, KKRC, and KMGM are local radio stations owned by Iowa City Broadcasting Company, Inc. KRAM-LP is owned by Thunderhawk Broadcasting, Inc.

== Notable people ==
- Nelbert Chouinard (1879-1969), American artist who founded the Chouinard Arts Institute (1921) in Los Angeles, California.
- Alfred M. Falkenhagen (1898–1968), Minnesota state legislator and farmer
- Vernon K. Jensen (1912–1982), veterinarian and Minnesota state senator
- David Minge (1942–), U.S. representative and Minnesota Court of Appeals judge
- Merle Steven McClung (1943-2026), Rhodes scholar, education law consulant, author
- Wayne Brabender (1945–), professional basketball player for Real Madrid and the Spanish National Basketball team.
- Paul Gruchow (1947–2004), professor at St. Olaf and Concordia colleges
